= List of places in Arizona (A) =

This list of current cities, towns, unincorporated communities, counties, and other recognized places in the U.S. state of Arizona, which start with the letter A. This list is derived from the Geographic Names Information System, which has numerous errors, so it also includes many ghost towns and historical places that are not necessarily communities or actual populated places. This list also includes information on the number and names of counties in which the place lies, its lower and upper ZIP code bounds, if applicable, its U.S. Geological Survey (USGS) reference number(s) (called the GNIS), class as designated by the USGS, and incorporated community located in (if applicable).

== A ==
Name of place	Number of counties	Principal county	GNIS #(s)	Class	Located in	ZIP code	
Name of place	Number of counties	Principal county	GNIS #(s)	Class	Located in	Lower	Upper
Achi	1	Pima County	24292	Populated Place			
Adamana	1	Apache County	479	Populated Place			
Adamsville	1	Pinal County	24293	Populated Place		85232	
Agua Caliente	1	Maricopa County	24294	Populated Place		85352	
Agua Fria	1	Maricopa County	511	Populated Place	El Mirage	85335	
Aguila	1	Maricopa County	2582720	CDP		85320	
Ahan Owuch	1	Pima County	24295	Populated Place			
Ahwatukee	1	Maricopa County	24705	Populated Place	Phoenix	85044	
Ajo	1	Pima County	2407704	CDP		85321	
Ak Chin	1	Pima County	2582721	CDP		85634	
Ak-Chin Village	1	Pinal County	2407705	CDP			
Ak Chut Vaya	1	Pima County	24296	Populated Place			
Ak Komelik	1	Pima County	24297	Populated Place			
Alamo Lake	1	La Paz County	2582722	CDP		85357	
Alhambra	1	Maricopa County	580	Populated Place	Phoenix		
Ali Ak Chin	1	Pima County	24298	Populated Place			
Ali Chuk	1	Pima County	2582723	CDP			
Ali Chukson	1	Pima County	2582724	CDP			
Ali Molina	1	Pima County	2582725	CDP			
Ali Oidak	1	Pima County	24300	Populated Place			
Allah	1	Maricopa County	24301	Populated Place			
Allentown	1	Apache County	24302	Populated Place	Houck	86506	
Allenville	1	Maricopa County	605	Populated Place		85326	
Alpine	1	Apache County	2582726	CDP		85920	
Alto	1	Santa Cruz County	25608	Populated Place			
Amado	1	Santa Cruz County	2407737	CDP		85640	
Amphitheater	1	Pima County	37138	Populated Place	Tucson		
Anegam	1	Pima County	2582727	CDP		85634	
Antares	1	Mohave County	2582728	CDP			
Anthem	1	Maricopa County	2582729	CDP		85086	
Apache	1	Cochise County	24304	Populated Place		88056	
Apache Grove	1	Greenlee County	24305	Populated Place			
Apache Junction	2	Pinal County		Civil		85220	
Apache Wells	1	Maricopa County	36924	Populated Place	Mesa	85205	
Apex	1	Coconino County	25248	Populated Place			
Aravaipa	1	Graham County	25296	Populated Place			
Arcosanti	1	Yavapai County	38221	Populated Place			
Aripine	1	Navajo County	25737	Populated Place			
Arivaca	1	Pima County	2582730	CDP		85601	
Arivaca Junction	1	Pima County	2582731	CDP			
Arizola	1	Pinal County	765	Populated Place		85222	
Arizona City	1	Pinal County	2407758	CDP		85223	
Arizona Sun Sites	1	Cochise County	25277	Populated Place		85625	
Arizona Village	1	Mohave County	2407759	CDP			
Arlington	1	Maricopa County	2582732	CDP			
Arrowhead Ranch	1	Maricopa County	24718	Populated Place	Glendale		
Artesa	1	Pima County	24310	Populated Place		85634	
Artesia	1	Graham County	24311	Populated Place		85546	
Ash Fork	1	Yavapai County	2407771	CDP		86320	
Ashurst	1	Graham County	25297	Populated Place			
Aultman	1	Yavapai County	25847	Populated Place	Camp Verde		
Avenue B and C	1	Maricopa County	2582733	CDP			
Avondale	1	Maricopa County	2409765	City		85323	
Avra	1	Pima County	24314	Populated Place	Picture Rocks		
Avra Valley	1	Pima County	2407789	CDP			
Aztec	1	Yuma County	2582734	CDP		85352	
