= Henry Ashurst =

Henry Ashurst may refer to:

- Henry F. Ashurst (1874–1962), U.S. Senator from Arizona, 1912–1941
- Sir Henry Ashurst, 1st Baronet (1645–1711), English Member of Parliament for Truro, 1681–1695, and Wilton, 1698–1701 and 1701–1702
- Sir Henry Ashurst, 2nd Baronet (c. 1670–1732), English Member of Parliament for Windsor, 1715–1722
- Henry Ashurst (merchant) (c. 1614–1680), English merchant
- Henry Ashurst (town clerk) (1669–1705), Town Clerk of London

== See also ==
- Ashurst (surname)
