= Ashurst =

Ashurst may refer to:

== Places ==
=== United Kingdom ===
- Ashurst, Hampshire
  - Served by Ashurst New Forest railway station
- Ashurst, Kent
  - Served by Ashurst (Kent) railway station
- Ashurst, Lancashire
- Ashurst, West Sussex
- Ashurst Wood, West Sussex

=== Other places ===
- Ashurst, Arizona, United States
- Ashhurst, a town in New Zealand

== Other uses ==
- Ashurst (surname)
- Ashurst baronets, an English baronetcy
- Ashurst LLP, a former international law firm headquartered in London
  - Ashurst Australia, subsidiary of Ashurst LLP
- Ashurst Perkins Coie, successor of the former Ashurst LLP and Perkins Coie
