= Grand Canyon Railway 29 =

Preserved American 2-8-0 steam locomotive

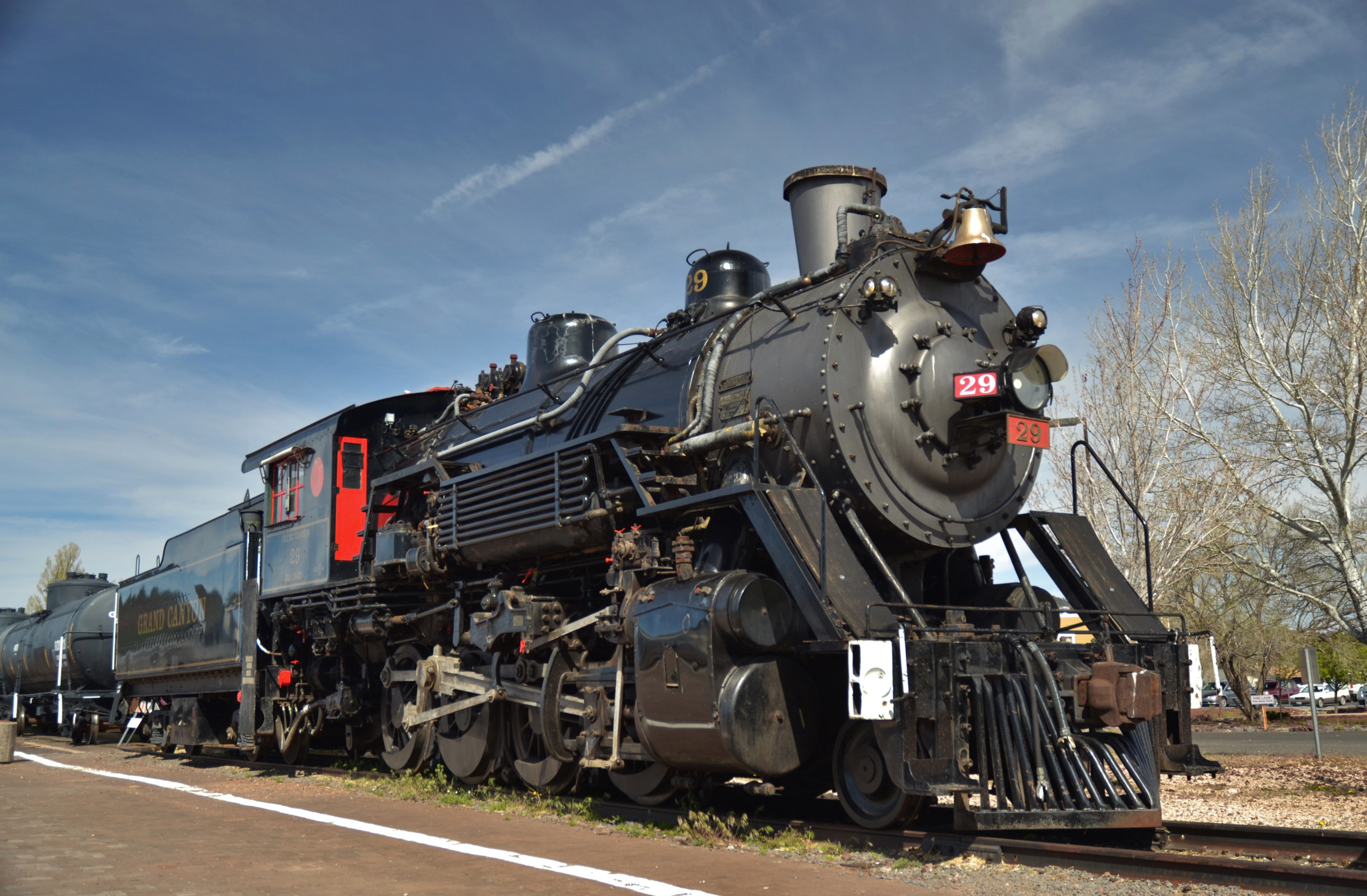
- No. 29 on display at the Williams, Arizona Depot, on May 4, 2014
Type and origin
- Power type: Steam
- Builder: American Locomotive Company (Pittsburg Works)
- Serial number: 39637
- Build date: May 1906
- Rebuilder: Lake Superior and Ishpeming Railroad
- Rebuild date: 1925
Specifications
- Configuration
  - Whyte: 2-8-0
  - UIC: 1'D'h
- Gauge: 4 ft 8 1/2 in (1,435 mm) standard gauge
- Driver dia.: New: 50 in (1,270 mm); Now: 56 in (1,422 mm)
- Loco weight: New: 209,000 lb (95,000 kg); Now: 227,000 lb (103,000 kg)
- Fuel type: New: Coal; Now: Recycled vegetable oil
- Fuel capacity: Coal: 24,000 lb (11,000 kg); Oil: 2,600 US gal (9,800 L); Vegetable oil: 2,600 US gal (9,800 L)
- Water cap.: 9,700 US gal (37,000 L)
- Boiler pressure: 200 psi (1,400 kPa)
- Feedwater heater: Worthington type SA
- Cylinders: Two, outside
- Cylinder size: New: 22 in × 30 in (560 mm × 760 mm); Now: 23 in × 30 in (580 mm × 760 mm)
- Valve gear: Walschaerts
- Valve type: Piston valves
- Loco brake: Air
- Train brakes: Air
- Couplers: Knuckle
Performance figures
- Maximum speed: 55 mph (89 km/h)
- Tractive effort: 48,500 lbf (215.7 kN); With Booster: 59,825 lbf (266.1 kN)
Career
- Operators: Lake Superior and Ishpeming Railroad; Grand Canyon Railway
- Class: New: B-4; Now: SC-3
- Numbers: LS&I 14; LS&I 29; GCRY 29
- Retired: 1956
- Restored: April 21, 1990
- Current owner: Grand Canyon Railway
- Disposition: Operational

Grand Canyon Railway 29 is an SC-3 class 2-8-0 "Consolidation" type steam locomotive, built by the American Locomotive Company's (ALCO) Pittsburg Works in May 1906 for the Lake Superior and Ishpeming Railroad (LS&I) in Upper Michigan. The sole member of the LS&I's SC-3 class, it was originally numbered 14, but was renumbered to 29 in 1924. Having gone through two major rebuilds to upgrade its performance, No. 29 served the LS&I in pulling freight and iron ore trains until being retired in 1956.

In 1963, No. 29 was sold to the Marquette and Huron Mountain tourist railroad, where it spent several years in storage alongside other LS&I steam locomotives. In 1985, No. 29 was sold to a private owner, who in turn sold it to the Grand Canyon Railway (GCR). GCR returned No. 29 to service in April 1990, and the locomotive pulled the railway's passenger trains between Williams, Arizona and the South Rim of the Grand Canyon.

== History ==
=== Construction and revenue service ===
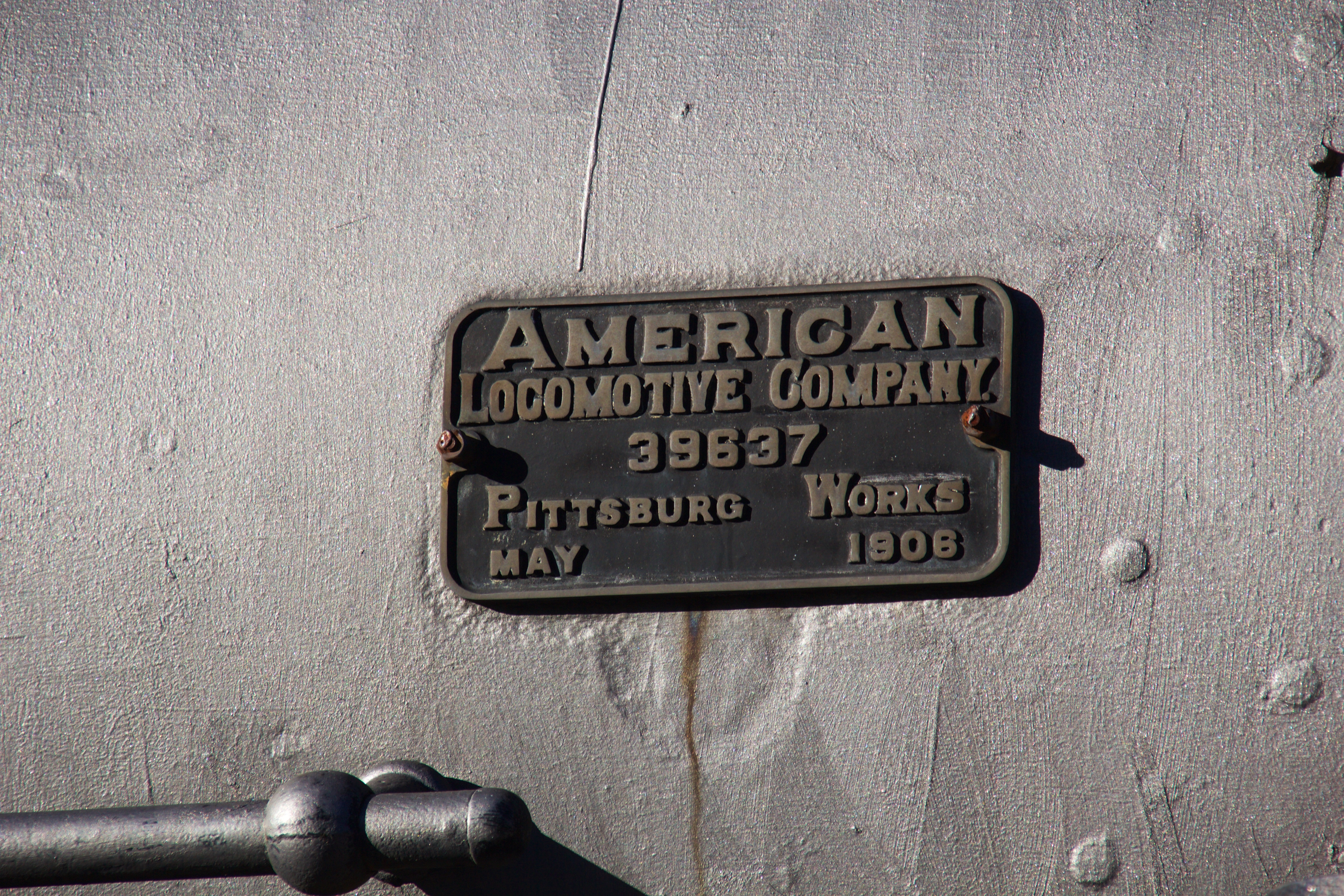
No. 29's builder's plate

In 1902, the Lake Superior and Ishpeming Railway (LS&I) authorized to purchase three 2-8-0 locomotives, following a major increase in iron ore train traffic. The first two locomotives (Nos. 15–16) were delivered from the Baldwin Locomotive Works in 1905 at a cost of $14,697 each, while the third locomotive, No. 29—originally numbered 14—was delivered from the American Locomotive Company's (ALCO) Pittsburg Works in 1906 at a cost of $15,800. (Note: Nos. 14–16 were previously assigned by the LS&I to a small group of 0-4-0 locomotives.) (Note: The location was known as Pittsburg Works at the time these locomotives were built from 1891 till 1911.) Classified as B-4s, the three locomotives were designed with 22-by-30-inch (559 mm × 762 mm) cylinders and a working boiler pressure of 200 psi (1,379 kPa), and they could generate 43,304 pounds-force (193 kilonewtons) of tractive effort, allowing them a maximum hauling capacity of 45 hopper cars. The LS&I initially assigned No. 14 to pull empty hopper cars up a 1.63%-grade to iron ore mines in Negaunee and Ishpeming, Michigan. After the hoppers would be loaded with ore, the locomotive would pull the loaded train down the grade and onto an ore dock at Presque Isle, where the ore would be loaded into vessels for shipment across Lake Superior. On June 2, 1916, No. 14 pulled a loaded iron ore train out of Negaunee before it experienced a major accident: the locomotive and several hoppers toppled down a steep embankment. It subsequently took one month to repair and return No. 14 to service.

By that time, the B-4 locomotives were replaced by three larger Baldwin-built SC-1 class 2-8-0s in the hill-climbing ore train assignments. The LS&I primarily reassigned the B-4s to switching at ore mines and to steam shovel operations. In 1924, the LS&I merged with the Munising, Marquette and Southeastern Railway (MM&SE) and reorganized as the Lake Superior and Ishpeming Railroad. Almost all locomotives retained by the company were renumbered, with No. 14 being renumbered to 29, while Nos. 15 and 16 became Nos. 27 and 28, respectively, and the B-4s were reclassified as C-3s. (Note: The No. 14 became assigned to an MK-1 class 2-8-2 locomotive.) The following year, in 1925, No. 29 was moved to the LS&I's Presque Isle locomotive shops to be extensively rebuilt and modified.

The boiler received a feedwater heater and a wider firebox with thermic syphons; the cylinders were replaced with superheated 23-by-30-inch (584 mm × 762 mm) cylinders; and No. 29 was reclassified as an SC-3, becoming the sole example of the railroad's class name. No. 29 was subsequently reassigned again to pull local freight trains between Marquette and Munising. In 1934, the locomotive was modified with a tender booster that was previously applied to LS&I SC-1 No. 32—when activated, the booster would upgrade No. 29's tractive effort to 59,825 pounds-force (266 kilonewtons). Afterward, the LS&I further reassigned the SC-3 to pull loaded iron ore trains and mixed freight trains. During and after World War II, No. 29 was stationed to work throughout the Ishpeming area, until it was retired in 1956. Nos. 27 and 28 were both scrapped that same year. No. 29 was then stored inside a roundhouse in Marquette and used to thaw frozen iron ore, but by 1958, No. 29 was in outdoor storage on a siding in Marquette, alongside other retired LS&I steam locomotives.

=== Retirement ===
In 1963, No. 29 was one of eleven LS&I 2-8-0s to be purchased by the newly-formed Marquette and Huron Mountain (M&HM) tourist railroad. Under M&HM ownership, the SC-3 continued to be stored while the railroad only used three other locomotives for their operations. Later, in 1984, the M&HM's owner died, and all of the equipment the railroad owned by that time was sold at an auction on January 14, 1985. During the auction, No. 29 was purchased by Steve Mattox of Council Bluffs, Iowa, and he subsequently arranged for the locomotive to be stored at the Mid-Continent Railway Museum (MCRY) in North Freedom, Wisconsin.

=== Grand Canyon Railway ownership ===
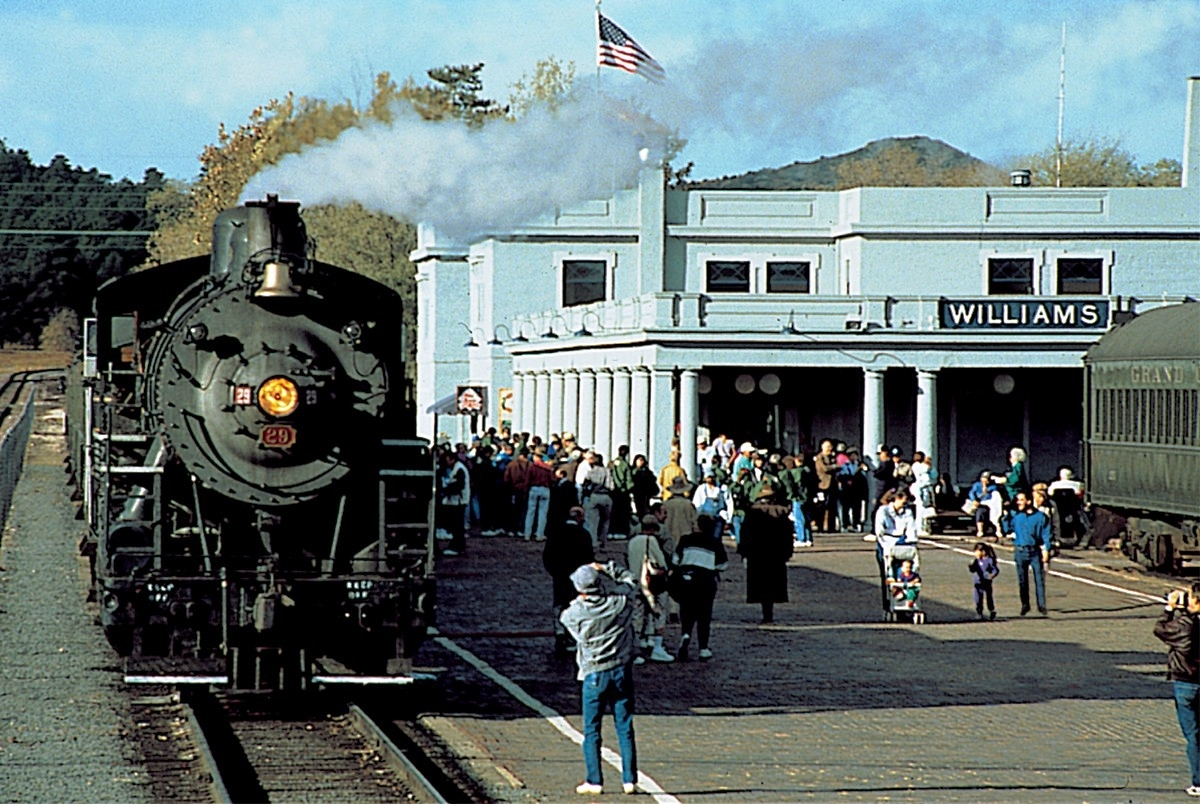
GCR No. 29 waiting to depart the Williams Depot in the 1990s

Throughout 1989, under the guidance of Max and Thelma Biegert, the Santa Fe Railroad's (ATSF) abandoned 64-mile (103 km) route between Williams, Arizona, and the South Rim of the Grand Canyon was being redeveloped into a passenger excursion operation, called the Grand Canyon Railway (GCR). In July that same year, Mattox agreed to sell No. 29 to GCR, and they purchased three LS&I SC-4 class locomotives (Nos. 18, 19, and 20) from entrepreneur John Slack. Following some shipping delays caused by the Chicago and North Western (CNW), all four locomotives were brought to Williams via flatcar by late August. No. 18 was in the process of being restored to operating condition while it was purchased, so it was selected to be restored for GCR first. Following No. 18's return to service in September, GCR's shop crews began restoration work on No. 29 that same month, they also planned to converted it to burn oil instead of coal. Initially, work on the SC-3 took place outdoors, but as temperatures in Williams fell during the winter months, outdoor work became problematic for GCR staff.

Beginning in January 1990, all work on GCR's equipment, including No. 29, was moved inside a newly-constructed locomotive shop with air conditioning and necessary tools. After three months of work, No. 29 emerged from the shop on April 21 and performed its first test run. No. 29 officially entered service for GCR on April 26, and it pulled its first train between Williams and the South Rim of the Grand Canyon. It was quickly discovered that Nos. 18 and 29 each could only pull six and seven passenger cars on the line unassisted, and by the mid-1990s, with the opening of a hotel adjacent to the Williams depot, GCR's passenger train schedule was expanding. GCR simultaneously acquired Ex-Via Rail FPA-4 diesel locomotives for use in pulling most of their expanded trains, and the railway approved the extensive rebuild of a bigger steam locomotive they had acquired, Ex-Burlington Route 2-8-2 No. 4960. In 1995, No. 29 was removed from service to undergo a mandated boiler inspection. The locomotive subsequently received a major rebuild that took 26,000 hours of labor and cost over $1 million to complete.

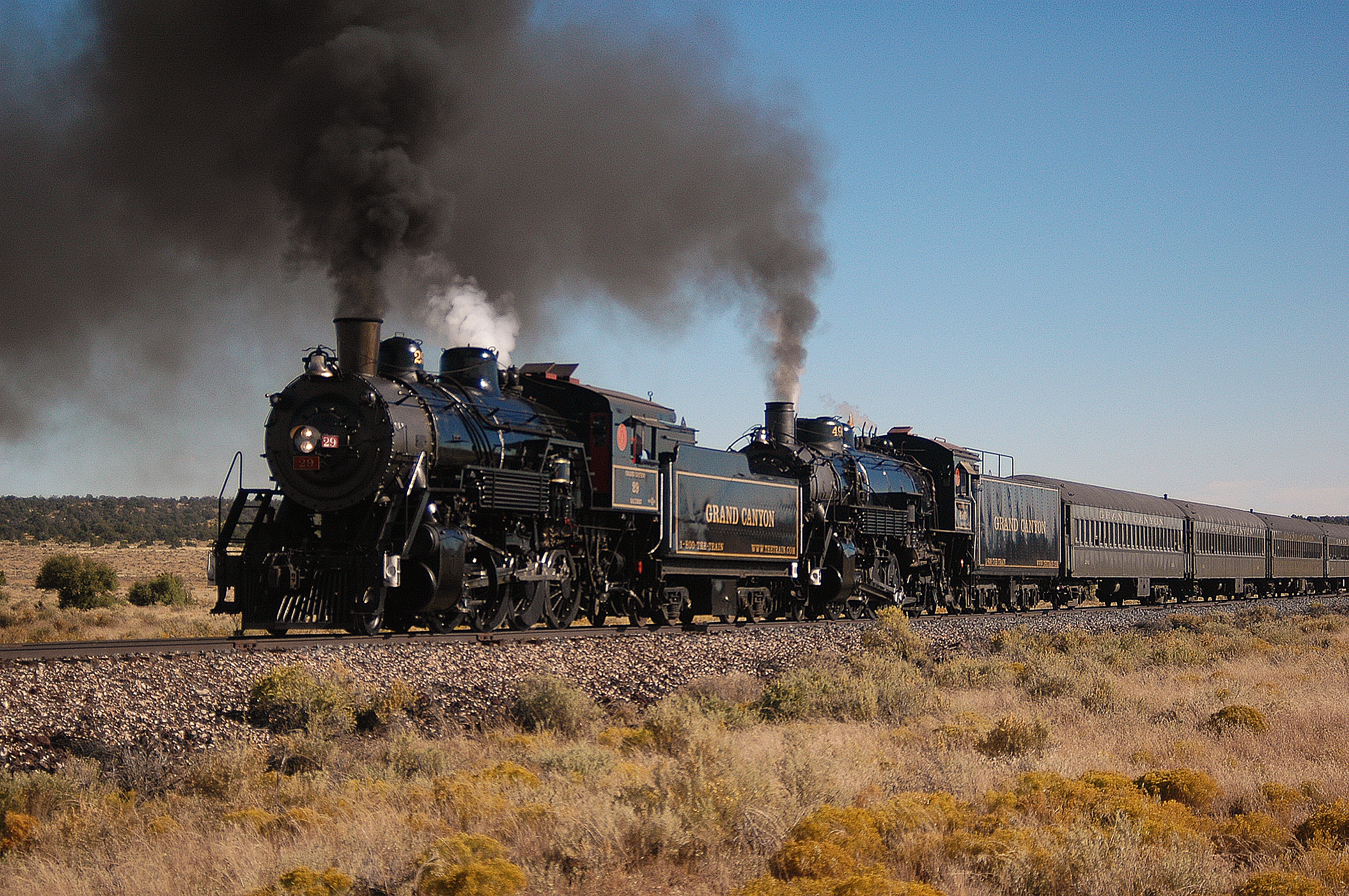
No. 29 performing a doubleheader with GCR No. 4960 during a photo charter, on October 1, 2005

No. 29 returned to service for GCR in 2004. The following year, No. 29 was modified with a Lempor Exhaust System and a new smokestack to increase its draft and to reduce its back pressure. In 2006, Max and Thelma Biegert sold GCR to Xanterra Parks and Resorts, and as a result of environmental concerns and rising fuel prices, Xanterra chose to discontinue regular steam operations on GCR in September 2008. While No. 4960 was converted to burn waste vegetable oil (WVO) and returned to service in 2009, No. 29 was put on display near the Williams Depot, and later the Grand Canyon Depot.

In 2016, during the centennial of the National Park Service (NPS), GCR repaired and returned No. 29 to service, converting it to burn WVO in the process. No. 29's return to service led to GCR receiving the Governor's Tourism Award for Outstanding Culture and Historical Preservation by the Arizona Office of Tourism, on July 20, 2017. Throughout 2019, No. 29 pulled most of the steam excursions of that season before taking part in a two-day photo charter, and then it was due to undergo a federally mandated Federal Railroad Administration (FRA) 1,472-day inspection by the end of the year. After the charters ended in October, No. 29 was put back on display, waiting for its required overhaul to take place. The overhaul began in late 2023, with the boiler flues and tubes being removed.

No. 29's overhaul was completed on August 26, 2026, and returned to service. On September 19, No. 29 made its first return to excursion service and ran a doubleheader excursion with No. 4960 in celebration of the railroad's 125th anniversary.

== See also ==
- Lake Superior and Ishpeming 22
- Lake Superior and Ishpeming 23
- Lake Superior and Ishpeming 33
- McCloud Railway 18
- Tremont and Gulf 30
- Western Maryland Scenic Railroad 734

== Bibliography ==
- Durocher, Aurele (April 1958). "The Lake Superior and Ishpeming Railroad Company". The Railway and Locomotive Historical Society Bulletin (98): 7–31. JSTOR 43520202.
- Schauer, David (2015). Lake Superior & Ishpeming Railroad In Color. Vol. 1. Scotch Plains, New Jersey: Morning Sun Books, Inc. ISBN 978-1-58248-494-5.
- Richmond, Al (2017). The Story of Grand Canyon Railway: Cowboys, Miners, Presidents & Kings. Grand Canyon, Arizona: Grand Canyon Conservancy. ISBN 978-1-934656-91-4.
- Bunker, Kevin (July–August 1995). "Conserving a Legend: Arizona's Grand Canyon Railway". Locomotive & Railway Preservation. Pentrex. pp. 30–50.
- Bianchi, Curt (May 1995). "By steam to the Grand Canyon". Trains. Vol. 55, no. 5. Kalmbach Media. pp. 40–42.
- Mitchell, Alexander (September 2019). "Thirty Years of Growth and Change: Grand Canyon Railway". Railfan & Railroad. Vol. 38, no. 9. White River Productions. pp. 52–54.
- Wrinn, Jim (May 2010). "Grand Canyon goes green". Trains. Vol. 70, no. 5. Kalmbach Media. pp. 28–30.
