= Williams Junction station =

Former train station in Williams Junction, Coconino County, Arizona

Williams Junction, AZ
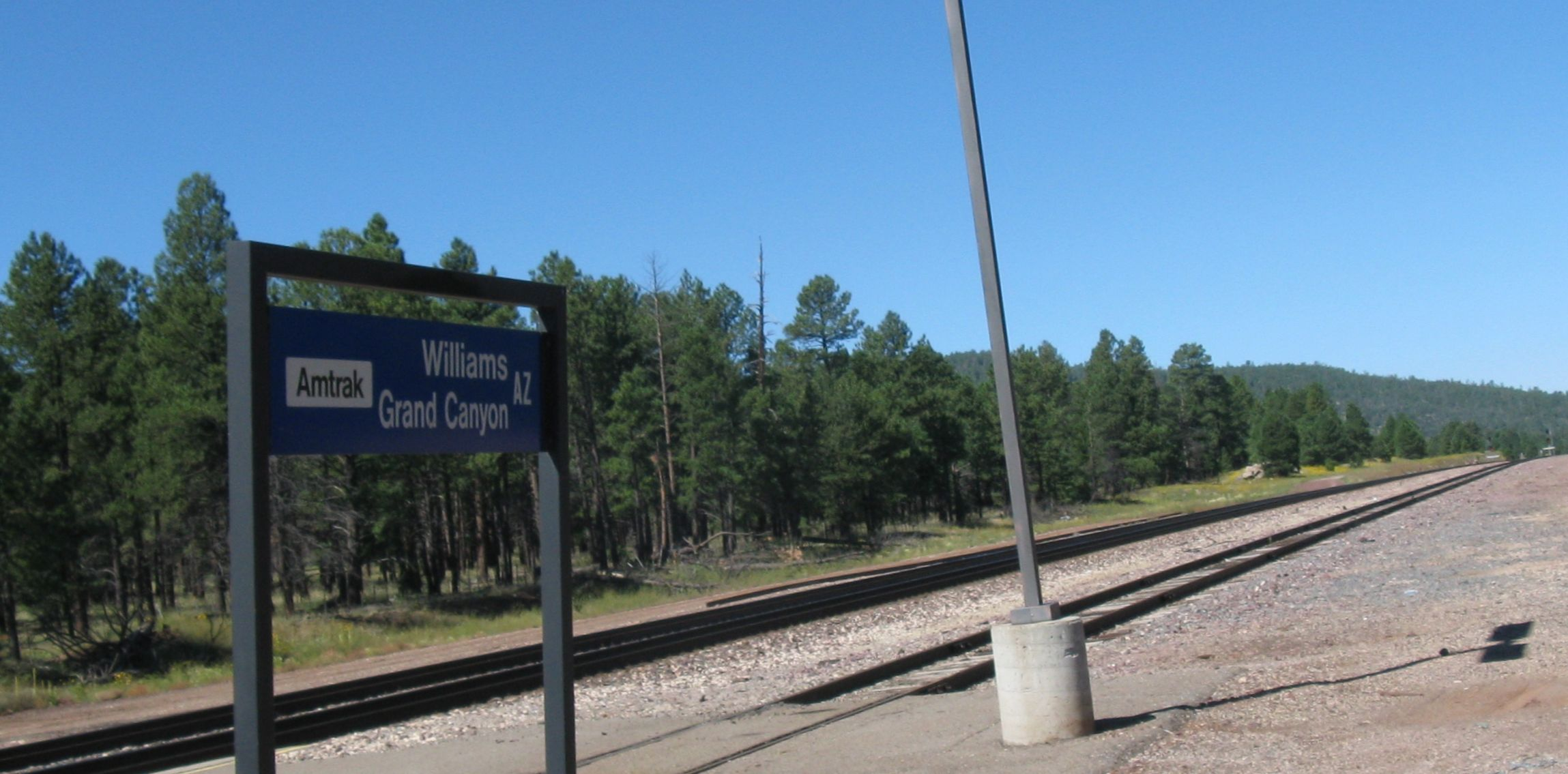
- Williams Junction station platform

General information
- Location: Old Depot Road; Williams, Arizona; United States
- Coordinates: 35°14′35″N 112°08′05″W
- Line: BNSF Seligman Subdivision
- Platforms: 2 (ground level paving serving two tracks)
- Tracks: 3 (two main line tracks, one passing loop)
- Connections: Grand Canyon Railway shuttle

Other information
- Station code: WMJ

History
- Opened: December 18, 1960 (first station); August 2, 1999 (second station)
- Closed: April 30, 1969 (first station); January 1, 2018 (second station)

Passengers
- 2017: 9,672 ▲20.1% (Amtrak)

Former services
Preceding station	Amtrak	Following station
Kingman toward Los Angeles	Southwest Chief	Flagstaff toward Chicago
Location

Williams Junction station was an Amtrak train station on the Southwest Chief route, located three miles (4.8 km) southeast of Williams, Arizona in the Kaibab National Forest. The station primarily served passengers travelling to the Grand Canyon via the Grand Canyon Railway.

== History ==
The first station at Williams Junction was built by Morrison-Knudsen for the Atchison, Topeka & Santa Fe Railway as part of construction of the Crookton Cutoff: a new 44-mile (71 km) stretch of the Southern Transcon built to avoid the sharp curves and steep gradients of the existing line between Williams and Ash Fork. With the new route bypassing the town of Williams completely, Williams Junction replaced the downtown Williams Depot as the connection point between main line transcontinental services and Santa Fe trains to and from the Grand Canyon (trains 14 and 15). The station officially opened on December 18, 1960. Williams Depot remained open for the Hassayampa Flyer service between Williams Junction and Phoenix via Ash Fork and the Peavine route (trains 42 and 47). Both Williams stations closed on April 30, 1969 following the Santa Fe's discontinuation of passenger services to the Grand Canyon and Phoenix via the Peavine. The station building at Williams Junction remained standing for a few years following its closure, but was eventually demolished. The spur from the Southern Transcon and the line through downtown Williams were retained for freight services.

Following the successful regeneration of the former Santa Fe line to the Grand Canyon as a privately operated tourist venture in 1989, Amtrak introduced a stop at Williams Junction on their Southwest Chief route to connect with Grand Canyon Railway services. The new station opened on August 2, 1999. Unlike its predecessor, the modern Williams Junction had no station building or facilities, and no access for private motor vehicles. Passengers could only access the Williams Junction station using an Amtrak Thruway shuttle operated by the Grand Canyon Railway. The collection and drop-off point was the Grand Canyon Railway Hotel adjacent to the refurbished Williams Depot, now the southern terminus of the Grand Canyon line.

In 2017, the Grand Canyon Railway announced they would be discontinuing their shuttle that connected this station with their station and hotel in Williams, forcing the station to close on January 1, 2018. To accommodate passengers requiring a connection to the Grand Canyon, Amtrak introduced a new Thruway bus service to and from Flagstaff.
