= Wickenburg station =

Historic train station

Wickenburg
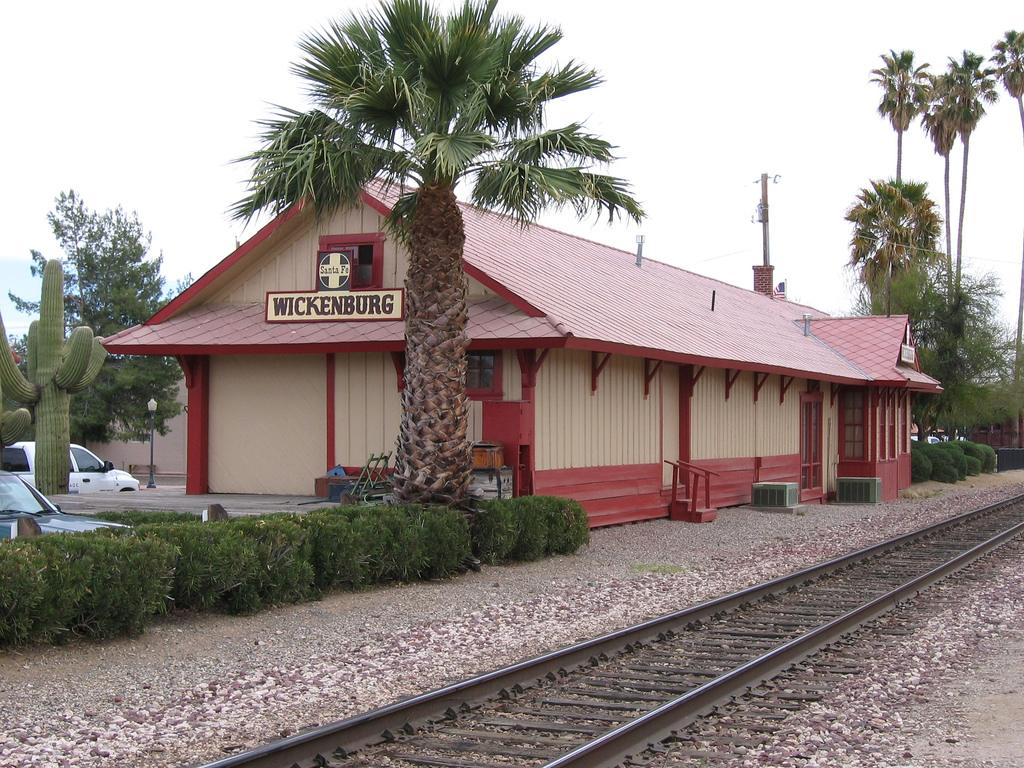

General information
- Location: 215 North Frontier Street; Wickenburg, Arizona
- System: Former ATSF station
- Owner: BNSF Railway

History
- Opened: 1895
- Closed: 1969

Former services
Preceding station	Atchison, Topeka and Santa Fe Railway	Following station
Matthie toward Ash Fork	Santa Fe, Prescott and Phoenix Railway	Castle Hot Springs toward Phoenix
Matthie toward Cadiz	Arizona and California Railway	Terminus
- Santa Fe Railroad Depot
- U.S. National Register of Historic Places
- Location within Arizona Location within the United States
- Coordinates: 33°58′10″N 112°43′54″W
- Area: less than one acre
- Built: 1895
- MPS: Wickenburg MRA
- NRHP reference No.: 86001588
- Added to NRHP: July 10, 1986
Location

The Wickenburg, Arizona station serves as the headquarters of the Wickenburg Chamber of Commerce, and is among the oldest of the Santa Fe's wooden stations in Arizona. It remains very nearly in its original configuration.

== History ==
The depot was dedicated on July 29, 1895. The station last saw passenger service in May 1969 when Santa Fe discontinued the daily Hassayampa Flyer between Phoenix and Williams Junction.

On July 29, 1995, Wickenburg celebrated the one hundred year anniversary of its railroad depot. The structure stands in its original 1895 design, without additions or modifications, and is one of the few such surviving examples of "Wild West" railroad architecture. Vice-Mayor Carol Ann Beard briefly described the history of the depot, which now serves as the Chamber of Commerce. "Estelle's Garden", in memory of a longtime Chamber supporter, was dedicated at the ceremony.

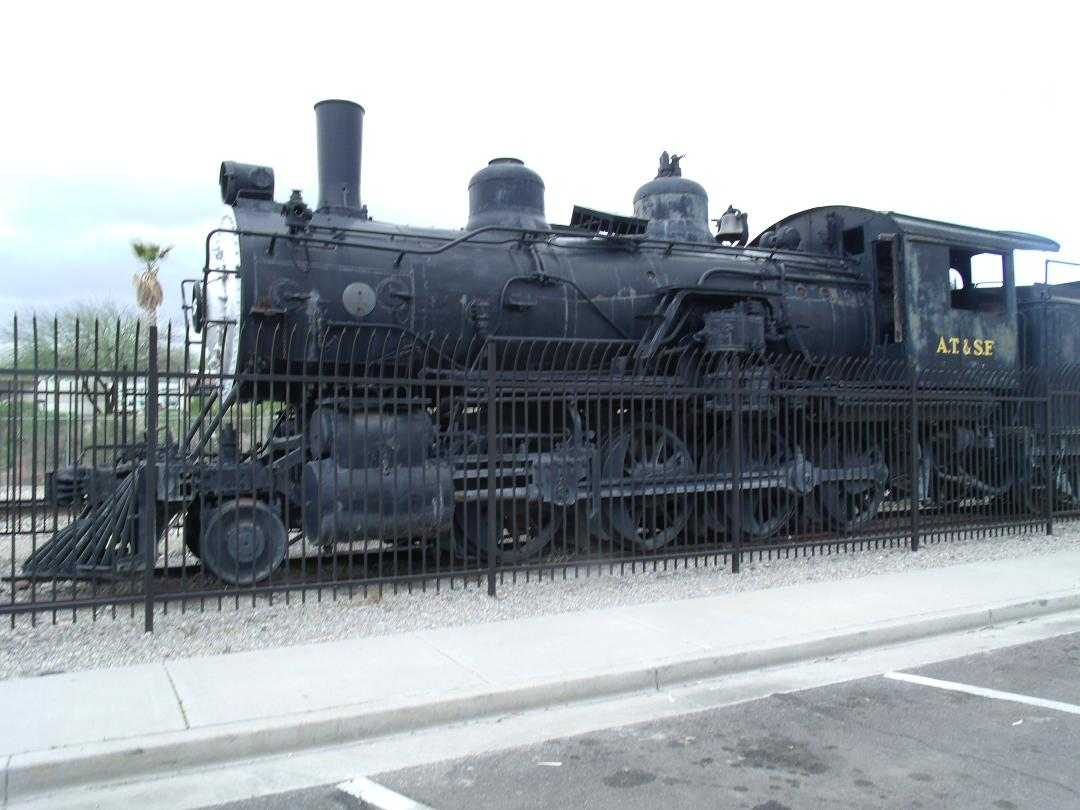
Engine 761, a Class 759, 2-8-0 built in 1890, is located next to the historic Wickenburg train depot.

== See also ==
- Castle Hot Springs (Arizona)
- Arizona and California Railroad
- Phoenix Subdivision (BNSF Railway)
