= Ashurst (surname) =

Ashurst is a surname. Notable people with the name include:

- Andy Ashurst (born 1965), British pole vaulter
- Bill Ashurst (1948–2022), English rugby league footballer
- Bill Ashurst (footballer) (1894–1947), English footballer
- Eli Ashurst (1901–1927), English footballer
- Henry Ashurst (merchant) (c. 1614–1680), English merchant
- Henry Ashurst (town clerk) (1669–1705), Town Clerk of London
- Henry F. Ashurst (1874–1962), U.S. Senator from Arizona (1912–1941)
- Sir Henry Ashurst, 2nd Baronet (c. 1670–1732), English Member of Parliament for Windsor, 1715–1722
- Jack Ashurst (born 1954), Scottish footballer
- James Ashurst (died 1679), English divine
- Len Ashurst (1939–2021), English footballer and manager
- Mark Ashurst-McGee (born 1969), Mormon historian
- Matty Ashurst (born 1989), English rugby league footballer
- Nigel Ashurst, New Zealand association football player
- William Ashhurst (1647–1720), English politician and banker
- William Ashurst (footballer) (1894–1947), English footballer
- William Ashurst (Lord Mayor of London) (1647–1720), English banker, Sheriff of London, Lord Mayor of London and Member of Parliament
- William Ashurst (Roundhead) (1607–1656), English politician
- William Henry Ashurst (judge) (1725–1807), English judge
- William Henry Ashurst (solicitor) (1792–1855), English solicitor
- William W. Ashurst (1893–1952), American brigadier general
