= Coconino station =

Former Grand Canyon Railway stop in Arizona, US

Coconino, Arizona
- Former train station
- Location within the state of Arizona Coconino, Arizona (the United States)
- Coordinates: 35°59′40″N 112°11′54″W
- Country: United States
- State: Arizona
- County: Coconino
- Elevation: 6,368 ft (1,941 m)
- Time zone: UTC-7 (Mountain (MST))
  - Summer (DST): UTC-7 (MST)
- Area code: 928
- FIPS code: 04-14630
- GNIS feature ID: 24374

Coconino station

General information
- Line: Grand Canyon Railway (station closed)

Former services
Preceding station	Atchison, Topeka and Santa Fe Railway	Following station
Anita toward Williams	Grand Canyon Railway	Grand Canyon Terminus
Location

Coconino station was a stop on the Grand Canyon Railway in Coconino County, Arizona. It was the penultimate stop before reaching Grand Canyon station. The concrete base of the original station and ruins of the section house remain. It has an estimated elevation of 6,368 feet (1,941 m) above sea level.
