= Williams Depot =

Train station in Williams, Coconino County, Arizona

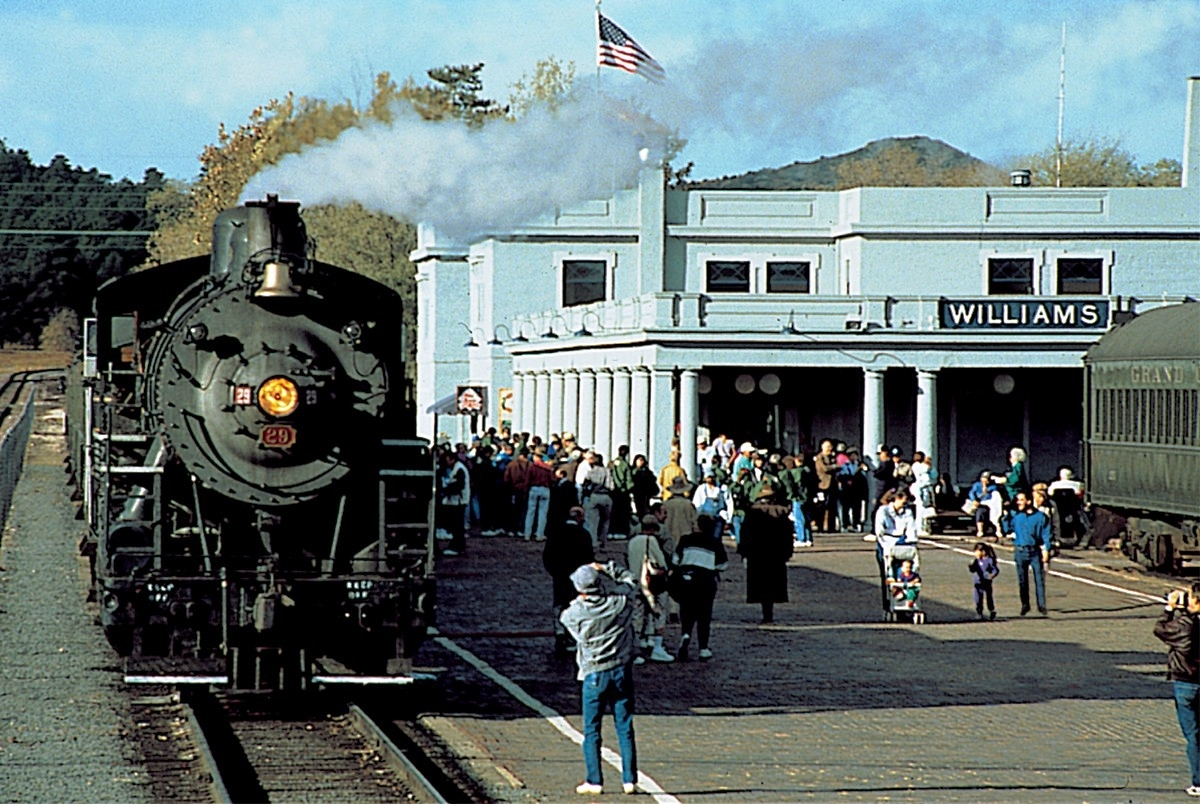

General information
- Location: 233 N Grand Canyon Blvd, Williams, AZ 86046
- Coordinates: 35°15′05″N 112°11′28″W
- Line: Grand Canyon Railway
- Platforms: 2
- Tracks: 3

History
- Opened: 1908; 118 years ago
- Rebuilt: 1989; 37 years ago

Services
Preceding station	Grand Canyon Railway	Following station
Terminus	Grand Canyon Railway	Grand Canyon Terminus

Former services
Preceding station	Atchison, Topeka and Santa Fe Railway	Following station
Ash Fork toward Los Angeles	Main Line	Bellemont toward Chicago
Terminus	Grand Canyon Railway	Red Lake toward Grand Canyon
Location

Williams Depot is a privately owned train station in Williams, Arizona. It is the southern terminus of the Grand Canyon Railway line.

== History ==
The first railroad in Williams was the western division of the transcontinental railroad built by the Atlantic and Pacific Railroad in 1882. By 1885 the first station was built in the town. Two years later, the Santa Fe and Grand Canyon Railroad was built to transport supplies and workers between Williams and the copper mines near Anita. In 1901, the SF&GC was sold under foreclosure to the Atchison, Topeka and Santa Fe Railway, who completed the remaining fifteen miles to the South Rim of the Grand Canyon. The company was renamed the Grand Canyon Railway and the Santa Fe's first passenger train from Williams to the Canyon ran on September 17, 1901.

With the former Atlantic and Pacific Railroad now forming part of the Santa Fe's Southern Transcontinental main line between Chicago and the West Coast, Williams became a hub for tourists wishing to visit the Grand Canyon. With a hotel and permanent terminus already built at the northern end of the Grand Canyon Railway, a brand new Williams depot was built by the Santa Fe in 1908. Incorporated into the building was one of the first Harvey House hotels, named the Fray Marcos after Spanish missionary Marcos de Niza, who explored the Southwest in the early 16th century. The original Atlantic and Pacific station building on the opposite side of the tracks was retained and remains in existence to this day, serving as the Williams Chamber of Commerce since 1994.

In 1960, the Santa Fe built the "Crookton Cutoff": a re-routing of a 44-mile (71 km) stretch of the Southern Transcon to avoid the sharp curves and steep gradients of the line between Williams and Ash Fork. With the new tracks bypassing the town of Williams completely, a new station at Williams Junction replaced Williams Depot as the connection point between main line services and trains to the Grand Canyon. Williams Depot was now served solely by the rerouted Hassayampa Flyer service between Williams Junction and Phoenix via Ash Fork and the Peavine route. Both Williams stations closed in 1969 following the Santa Fe's discontinuation of passenger services to the Grand Canyon and Phoenix via the Peavine the previous year. The connecting line through downtown Williams from Williams Junction was retained for freight traffic but there was limited scope for a similar retention of the Grand Canyon Railway. In the summer of 1974, a Santa Fe works train traversed the rails, removing track equipment and demolishing many lineside structures. It was the last train to run on the line for fifteen years. The station building at Williams Depot fell into disuse.

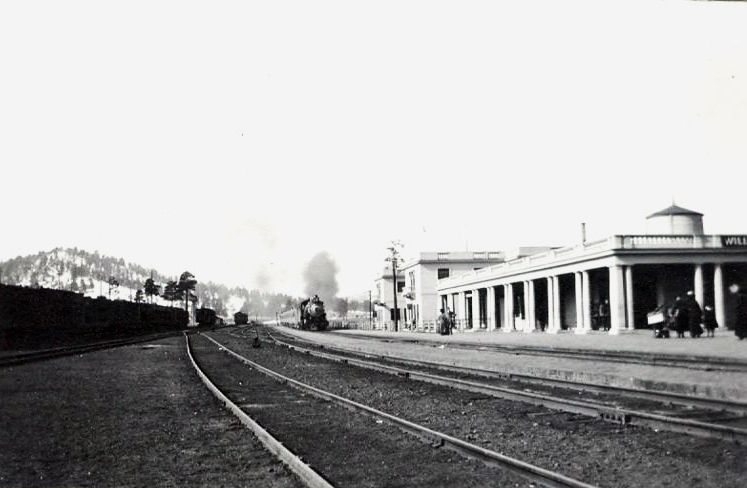
The Williams station when it was used by the Santa Fe Railway, 2010

Plans by entertainer Arthur Godfrey to resume service on the Grand Canyon Railway in 1977 fell through. In addition, two other companies attempted to resurrect the line in 1980 and 1984, with each attempt helping to maintain interest in preserving the line and saving it from scrapping without actually bringing trains back to the route. In 1988, the line was bought by Max and Thelma Biegert, a couple from Phoenix. The railway was restored, along with the stations at Williams and the Grand Canyon South Rim, and reopened as a separate company, independent of the Santa Fe. The first journey of the restored railroad was on September 17, 1989, exactly 88 years after the first train to the Canyon was run.

Williams Depot is now the southern terminus for the Grand Canyon Railway, containing a gift shop, coffee stand, rest room facilities, ticket counter and restaurant. Although the Fray Marcos hotel closed in 1954, the original building remains and is the oldest poured-concrete structure in the state of Arizona. It is listed on the register of Arizona State Historic Properties. The Grand Canyon Railway is listed on the National Register of Historic Places.
