= Arizona flagstone =

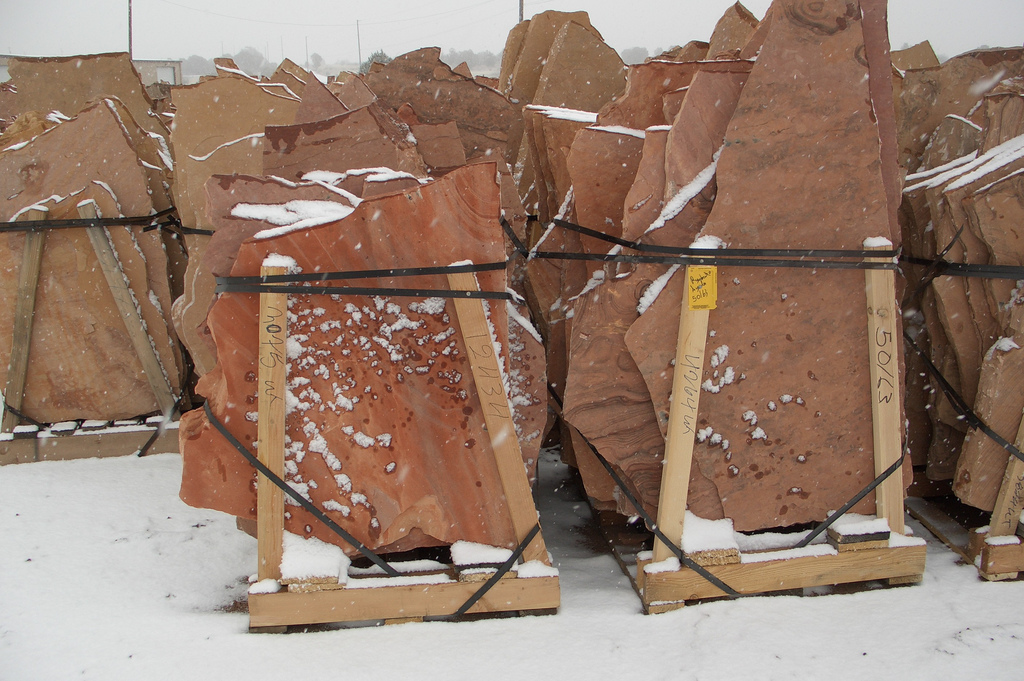
Arizona Flagstone in winter

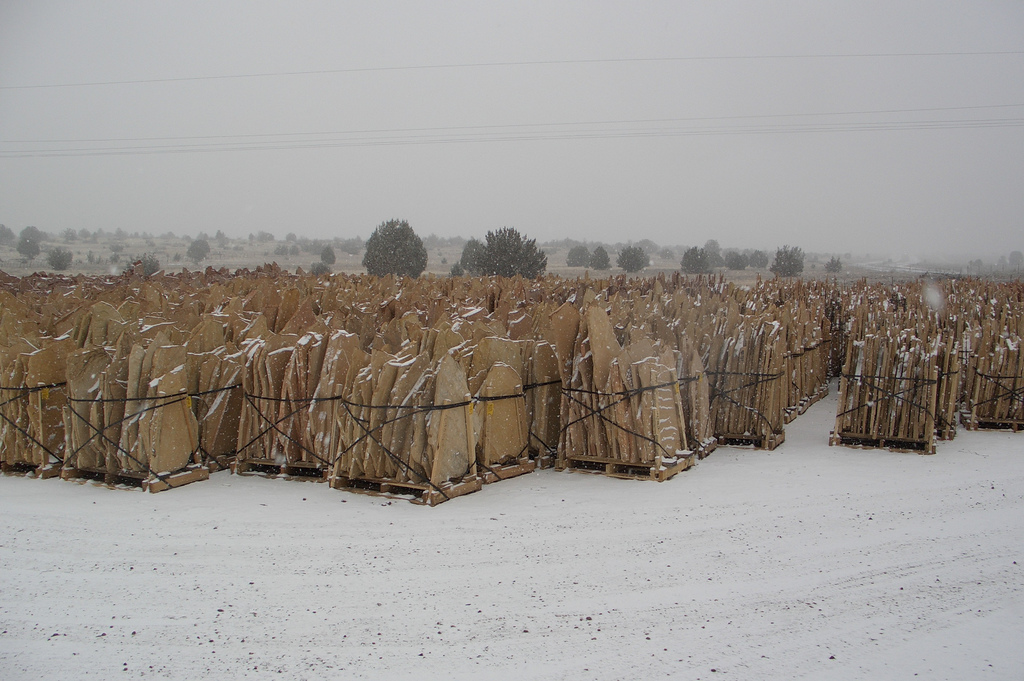
Buckskin Arizona Flagstone

Arizona flagstone is composed of rounded grains of quartz which are cemented by silica. Other minerals are present, mostly as thin seams of clay, mica, secondary calcite, and gypsum. Arizona flagstone is mainly quarried from the Coconino and Prescott National Forests.

Although flagstone and dimension stone are quarried from all over the state of Arizona, the town of Ash Fork, Arizona, is well known as the center of production and has proclaimed itself "The Flagstone Capital of the World". Extensive outcrops of Arizona flagstone are also found in Mohave, Coconino, Yavapai, Navajo, Apache, and Gila counties.

== External links and references ==
- Sandstone: Characteristics and Specifications (By S. B. Keith, Arizona Bureau of Mines, Tucson, Ariz)
- Arizona Bureau of Mines, 1958. Geologic map of Yavapai County, Arizona: Arizona Bur. Mines (scale 1:375,000
- A dictionary of mining, mineral, and related terms. Compiled and edited by Paul W. Thrush and the Staff of the Bureau of Mines.
- USGS Minerals Yearbook: Stone, Dimension
