= Allenville, Arizona =

Former town in Maricopa County

- Populated place
- Location of Allenville in Arizona
- Coordinates: 33°21′07″N 112°35′12″W
- Country: United States
- State: Arizona
- County: Maricopa
- Elevation: 837 ft (255 m)
- Time zone: UTC-7 (Mountain (MST))
  - Summer (DST): UTC-7 (MST)
- ZIP codes: 85326
- Area code: 623
- FIPS code: 04-01850
- GNIS feature ID: 605

Allenville was a community located in western Maricopa County, Arizona, United States, south of the town of Buckeye, on the edge of the Gila River, at an estimated elevation of 837 feet (255 m) above sea level.

The community was founded in 1944 after Phoenix-area developer Fred Norton subdivided land two miles south of Buckeye. The community was named after John Allen, a local, respected African-American man.

In 1969, the town had approximately 450 residents. A campaign by mayors around the Phoenix area to help bring running water to the community raised $26,000 that year. However, the wells which were dug contained arsenic or were contaminated with salt, so the community continued to import drinking water from nearby Buckeye.

In 1978, the Gila River flooded, devastating the Allenville community, bringing the population down to around 150 people. The community was abandoned after it was ravaged by another flood in 1981. Instead of rebuilding Allenville, most of the community moved to nearby Hopeville.
