= Hassayampa Flyer =

Overview
- Service type: Passenger rail
- Status: Discontinued
- Locale: Arizona
- Predecessor: Santa Fe, Prescott and Phoenix Railway
- First service: 1955
- Last service: 1969
- Former operator: Atchison, Topeka and Santa Fe Railway

Route
- Termini: Ash Fork (1955–1961); Williams Junction (1961–1968); Phoenix
- Train numbers: 42 (Phoenix–Ash Fork/Williams Junction); 47 (Ash Fork/Williams Junction–Phoenix)

On-board services
- Sleeping arrangements: Sleeping car (during summer months only)
- Catering facilities: Diner-lounge car
- Baggage facilities: Baggage car

The Hassayampa Flyer, also known as the Hassayampa Chief, was a passenger train operated by the Atchison, Topeka and Santa Fe Railway between Ash Fork (later Williams Junction) and Phoenix in Arizona, United States.

== History ==
In 1955, the Santa Fe reduced its passenger operations on the Peavine route to a single daily train in either direction. Officially designated as train 42 (northbound) and train 47 (southbound), the service became known unofficially as the Hassayampa Flyer or the Hassayampa Chief, after the nearby Hassayampa River. The northern terminus was originally Ash Fork, to connect passengers from Phoenix with transcontinental trains between Chicago and the West Coast on the Southern Transcon main line.

In 1960, the Santa Fe re-routed the Southern Transcon (via the Crookton Cutoff) to avoid the sharp curves and steep gradients between Williams and Ash Fork. The new 44-mile (71 km) stretch of railroad took the main line out of the downtown depots in both towns, with a freshly-constructed station constructed at Williams Junction serving as the new northern terminus for the Hassayampa Flyer.

The Santa Fe had already won planning approval for a further amendment to the route of the Peavine, creating a new cutoff that bypassed a tortuous section of track between Prescott and Skull Valley. Works began in 1961 and were completed the following year, leaving Prescott without any direct passenger services. A branch line to the town remained, but it was abandoned before the end of 1962. With passenger numbers on the route dwindling, through Pullman cars from Chicago to Phoenix were terminated in October 1967 and later that year the Santa Fe withdrew the Hassayampa Flyer from service. The Interstate Commerce Commission, the railroad regulatory body, ordered the train reinstated, but only a handful of passengers continued to use it. In April 1969, it was permanently removed from the timetable.
