= Grand Canyon Depot =

Historic train station inside Grand Canyon National Park

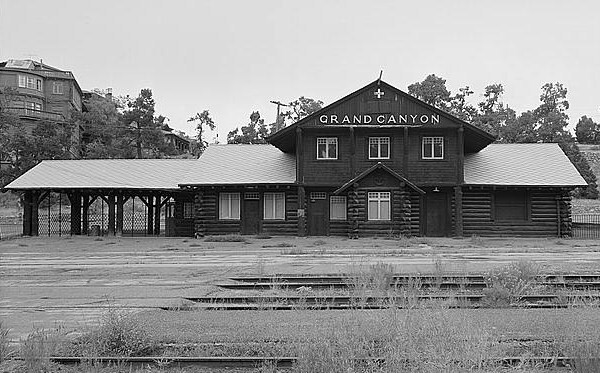
- The Grand Canyon Depot in September 1975

General information
- Location: Grand Canyon Village, Arizona
- Coordinates: 36°03′25″N 112°08′12″W
- Line: Grand Canyon Railway
- Platforms: 1

History
- Opened: 1909–1910
- Rebuilt: 1989

Services
Preceding station	Grand Canyon Railway	Following station
Williams Terminus	Grand Canyon Railway	Terminus

Former services
Preceding station	Atchison, Topeka and Santa Fe Railway	Following station
Coconino toward Williams	Grand Canyon Railway	Terminus
Location

- Grand Canyon Depot
- U.S. National Register of Historic Places
- U.S. National Historic Landmark
- U.S. National Historic Landmark District – Contributing property
- Location within Arizona Location within the United States
- Location: South Rim, Grand Canyon, Arizona
- Coordinates: 36°03′25″N 112°08′12″W
- Built: 1909–1910
- Architect: Francis W. Wilson
- Part of: Grand Canyon Village Historic District (ID75000343)
- NRHP reference No.: 74000337

Significant dates
- Added to NRHP: September 6, 1974
- Designated NHL: May 28, 1987
- Designated NHLDCP: February 18, 1987

Grand Canyon Depot, also known as Grand Canyon Railroad Station, was constructed in 1909–10 for the Atchison, Topeka and Santa Fe Railway at the South Rim of the Grand Canyon, in what is now Grand Canyon National Park. It is one of three remaining railroad depots in the United States built with logs as the primary structural material. The station is within 330 feet (100 m) of the rim of the canyon, opposite the El Tovar Hotel, also built by the railroad. The depot is designated a National Historic Landmark, is listed the National Register of Historic Places, and is included in the Grand Canyon Village National Historic Landmark District.

== History ==
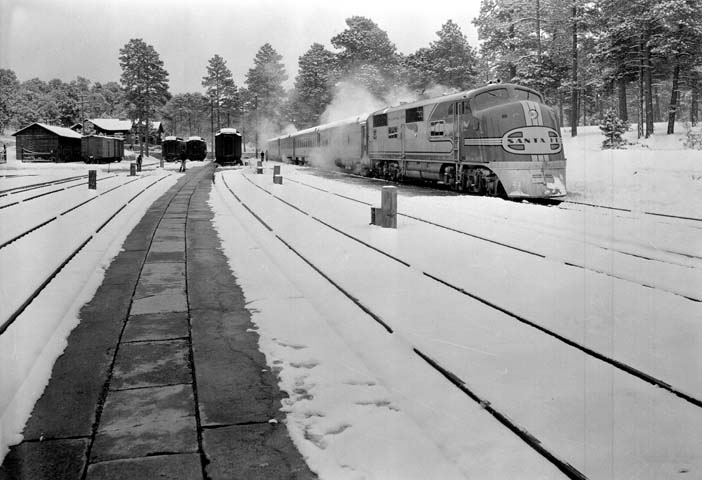
The Grand Canyon Depot in Winter 1938

The Santa Fe Railway obtained the rights to develop the South Rim of the Grand Canyon as a destination resort at the beginning of the twentieth century before the area had been designated a national park. As an outpost on the edge of the wilderness, the railroad designed a fittingly rustic structure for its Grand Canyon terminus, presaging the later use by the National Park Service of the National Park Service Rustic style for park structures in the surrounding Grand Canyon Village Historic District. It was the railway's goal to develop the Grand Canyon branch line to feed passengers into its system, stimulating rail traffic. The result was the only railroad line to a destination within a national park. The original developer of the line to the Grand Canyon was the Santa Fe and Grand Canyon Railroad, established in 1897 to serve a copper mine. This venture failed, with the tracks eight miles short of the Grand Canyon. The Grand Canyon Railway, a subsidiary of the Santa Fe, bought the project and completed tracks to the South Rim in 1901, and developed a rail yard at the terminus with a small frame terminal building. The El Tovar Hotel was completed in 1905, and it became apparent that a more suitable terminus was needed to complement the destination hotel experience.

The terminal location was moved to the east, away from the older Bright Angel Hotel, to a location directly opposite the El Tovar. AT&SF architect Francis W. Wilson was assigned to design the new station, following his work on remodeling the Bright Angel Hotel. Wilson designed the only log structure of his career, using materials that echoed and complemented the El Tovar across the street, only with superior attention to construction and detail. The station's first career as a passenger depot ended in 1968. The property was acquired by the National Park Service in 1982. The Grand Canyon Railway was revived as a tourist line in 1989 with service from Williams, Arizona to the South Rim, reviving the use of the depot for passengers.

== Description ==
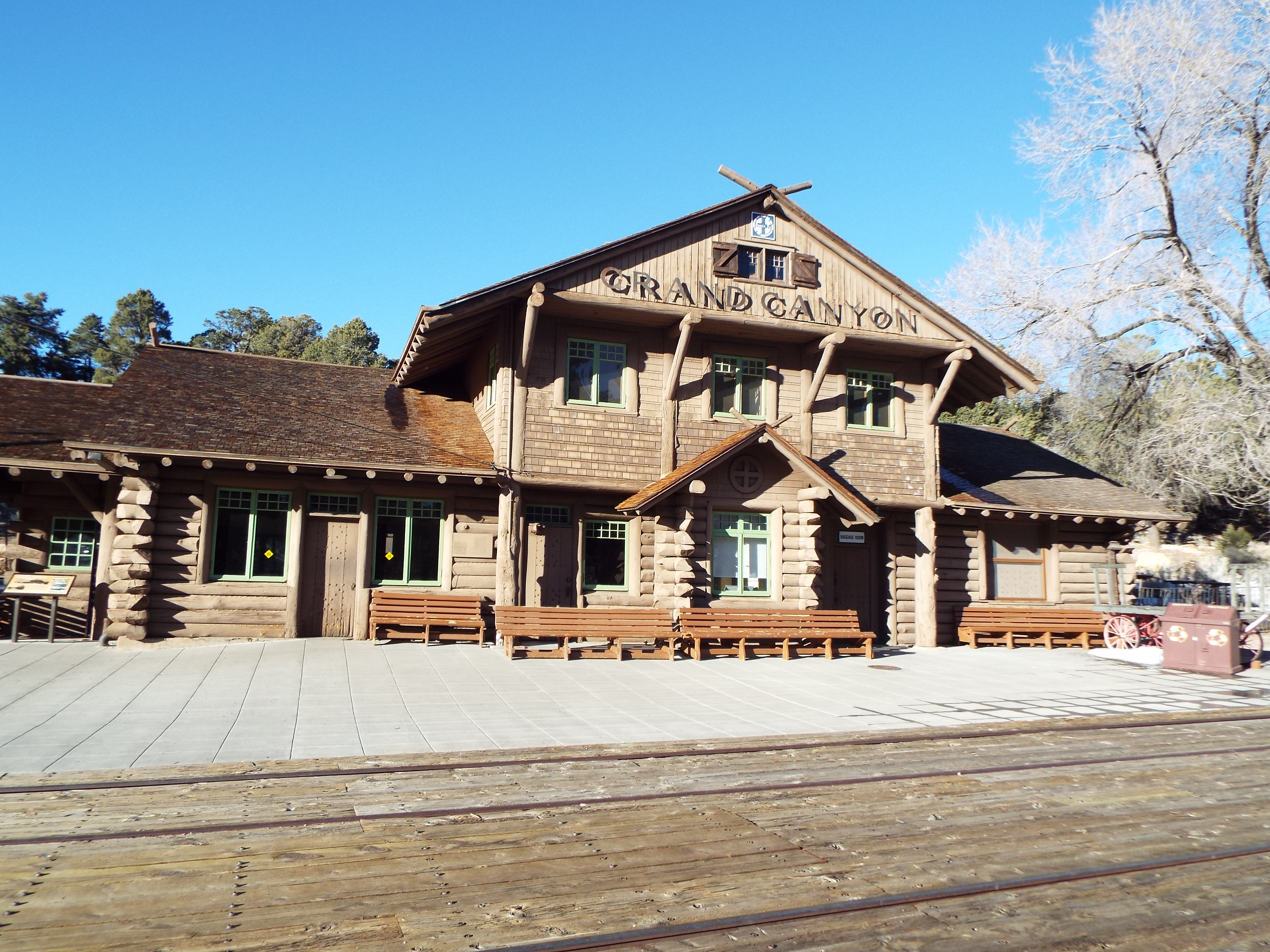
The Grand Canyon Depot in 2019

The Grand Canyon Depot is a 2-½ story wood structure of about 3,000 square feet (280 m^{2}), built primarily of logs with frame construction for the second floor. The main facade faces south, away from the canyon. The log structure is primarily a one-story building with a broad, moderately-pitched gable roof with the ridge running on the long axis, parallel to the train tracks. The frame second story occupies the center third of the building, of frame construction, sheathed with flush planking framed by vertical log posts. This central portion is covered with another broad gabled roof at right angles to the main roof. The second story overhangs the first, supported by heavy vertical log posts, and the attic in the deep gable overhangs the second story, supported by log brackets. An extension of the main roof to the west at a slightly lower elevation shelters a large two-bay porch supported on vertical log posts. A small one-story bay projects slightly from the central block.

The interior comprises four main rooms, from west to east a ticket office-waiting room, an agent's office, a parcel storage room and a baggage room. Men's and women's restrooms are between these rooms and the platform. Interior walls are plastered, with log-slab wainscoting. A small apartment for the station agent is upstairs, with a living room, kitchen, bathroom and two bedrooms. Much of the original hardware is present, stamped "GC."

== Historical designations ==
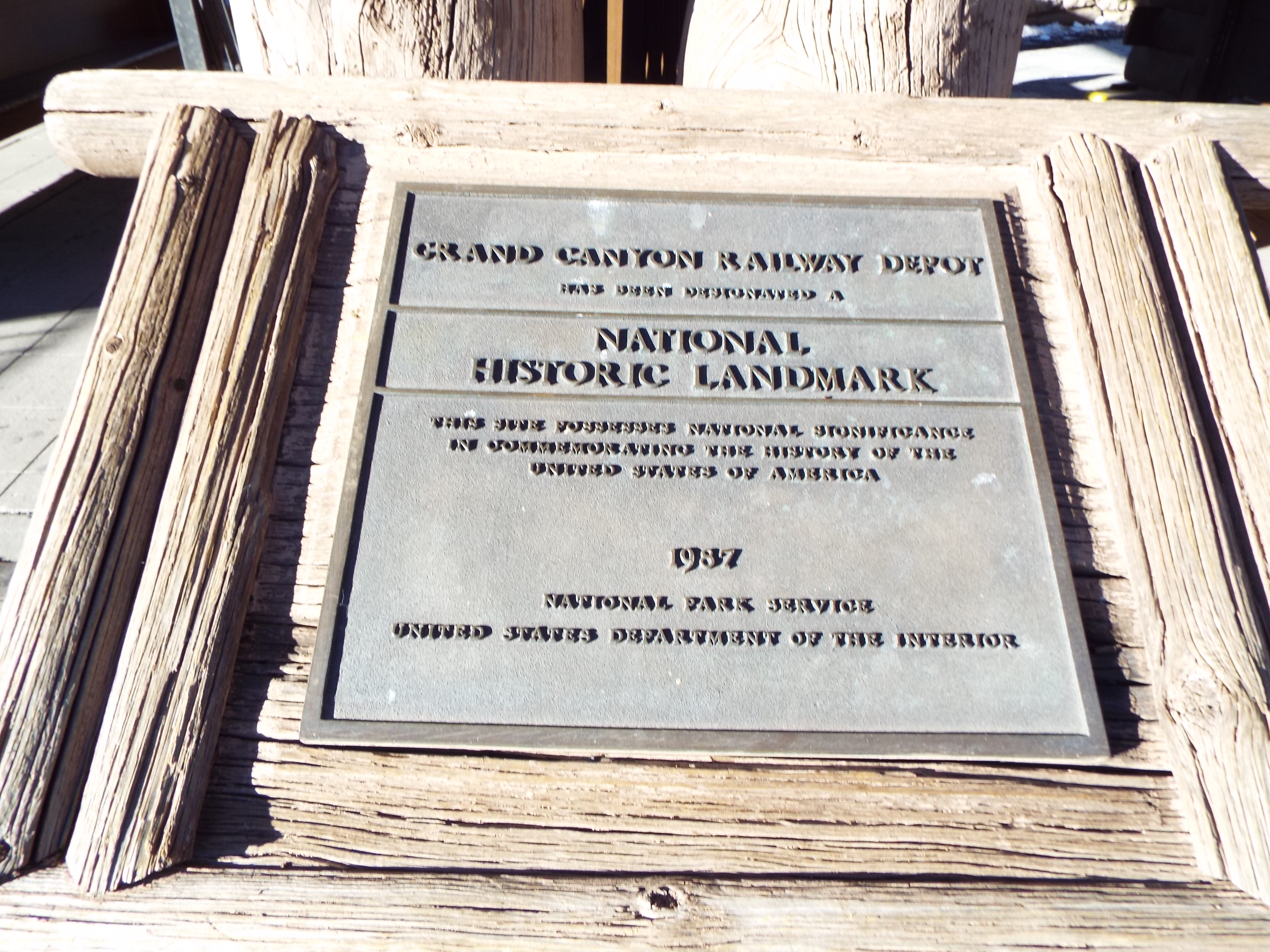
National Historic Landmark marker

The Grand Canyon Depot was added to the National Register of Historic Places on September 6, 1974, and was declared a National Historic Landmark on May 28, 1987. It is also included in the Grand Canyon Village National Historic Landmark District.

== See also ==
- Architects of the National Park Service
- National Register of Historic Places listings in Grand Canyon National Park
- Rustic architecture in Arizona
