= Sir Henry Ashurst, 1st Baronet =

English Whig politician and colonial agent

Sir Henry Ashurst, 1st Baronet (8 September 1645 – 13 April 1711) was an English Whig politician, merchant, and colonial agent who sat in the House of Commons of England between 1681 and 1702. A prominent supporter of Nonconformity, he served as the London agent for the New England colonies of Massachusetts Bay and Connecticut and was created a baronet in 1688.

== Early life and family ==
Ashurst was born on 8 September 1645, the eldest son of Henry Ashurst (c. 1614–1680), a wealthy London draper, alderman, and influential Presbyterian benefactor, and Judith Reresby. His younger brother, Sir William Ashurst, was a prominent merchant who later served as Lord Mayor of London in 1693 and as a Member of Parliament.

Raised in a devout Puritan household, Ashurst developed close ties with prominent Nonconformist theologians, including Richard Baxter, a long-time family friend. On 26 March 1670, Ashurst married Diana Paget (c. 1648–1707), daughter of William Paget, 6th Baron Paget. The couple had several children, including:

- Sir Henry Ashurst, 2nd Baronet (c. 1670–1732), who succeeded to the baronetcy and later served as MP for Windsor.
- Frances Ashurst (d. 1743), who married Sir Richard Allin, 1st Baronet.

== Political career ==
Ashurst was elected to Parliament as a member for Truro in March 1681 during the Exclusion Crisis. On 21 July 1688, James II granted him a baronetcy, designated "of Waterstock in the County of Oxford" in the Baronetage of England. This creation formed part of James II's broader campaign to court leading Protestant Dissenters and Whigs by extending religious toleration and royal favor.

Following the Glorious Revolution of 1688, Ashurst was quick to offer his support to William of Orange. He returned to the House of Commons as MP for Truro, holding the seat from 1689 until 1695. He subsequently served as MP for Wilton from 1698 to 1702. Throughout his parliamentary tenure, Ashurst aligned consistently with the Whig faction, frequently advocating for the legal protections and political rights of English Dissenters.

== New England colonial agent ==
Leveraging his family's long-standing connections with transatlantic Puritan networks, Ashurst played an influential role in colonial governance as a London agent for the New England Colonies.

Following the revocation of the original Massachusetts charter in 1684, Ashurst worked closely with Increase Mather to negotiate a new colonial charter with the Crown, resulting in the province charter of 1691. He acted as a key spokesman for Massachusetts interests at Whitehall and Parliament.

Ashurst also served as the official London agent for the Connecticut Colony, successfully defending its charter rights and territorial boundaries against administrative encroachments. He maintained an extensive correspondence with prominent colonial figures, including Increase Mather, Cotton Mather, and Samuel Sewall.

== Estates and later life ==
In 1691, Ashurst purchased the manor of Waterstock in Oxfordshire. Between 1695 and 1696, he constructed a substantial brick manor house, Waterstock House, which served as the principal seat of the Ashurst baronets. Ashurst died at Waterstock on 13 April 1711, aged 65, and was buried in the local parish church. He was succeeded in the baronetcy by his eldest son, Henry. The title became extinct upon the 2nd Baronet's death without male issue in 1732.

Baronetage of England
New creation	Baronet (of Waterstock); 1688–1711	Succeeded by Henry Ashurst
