= Ali Oidak, Arizona =

Unincorporated community in the state of Arizona, United States

- Populated place
- Location of Ali Oidak in Arizona Ali Oidak, Arizona (the United States)
- Coordinates: 31°54′09″N 111°46′49″W
- Country: United States
- State: Arizona
- County: Pima
- Elevation: 1,824 ft (556 m)
- Time zone: UTC-7 (Mountain (MST))
  - Summer (DST): UTC-7 (MST)
- Area code: 520
- FIPS code: 04-01670
- GNIS feature ID: 2582725

Ali Oidak or Alioitak is a populated place located in the Gu Achi District of the Papago Indian Reservation in Pima County, Arizona, United States. It has an estimated elevation of 1,824 feet (556 m) above sea level. The place name means "little field" in the O'odham or Papago language. A 1969 study of Papago communities lists it as a village with a single field well, supporting six houses.
