= Ash Fork station =

Former railway station in Arizona, U.S.

Ash Fork
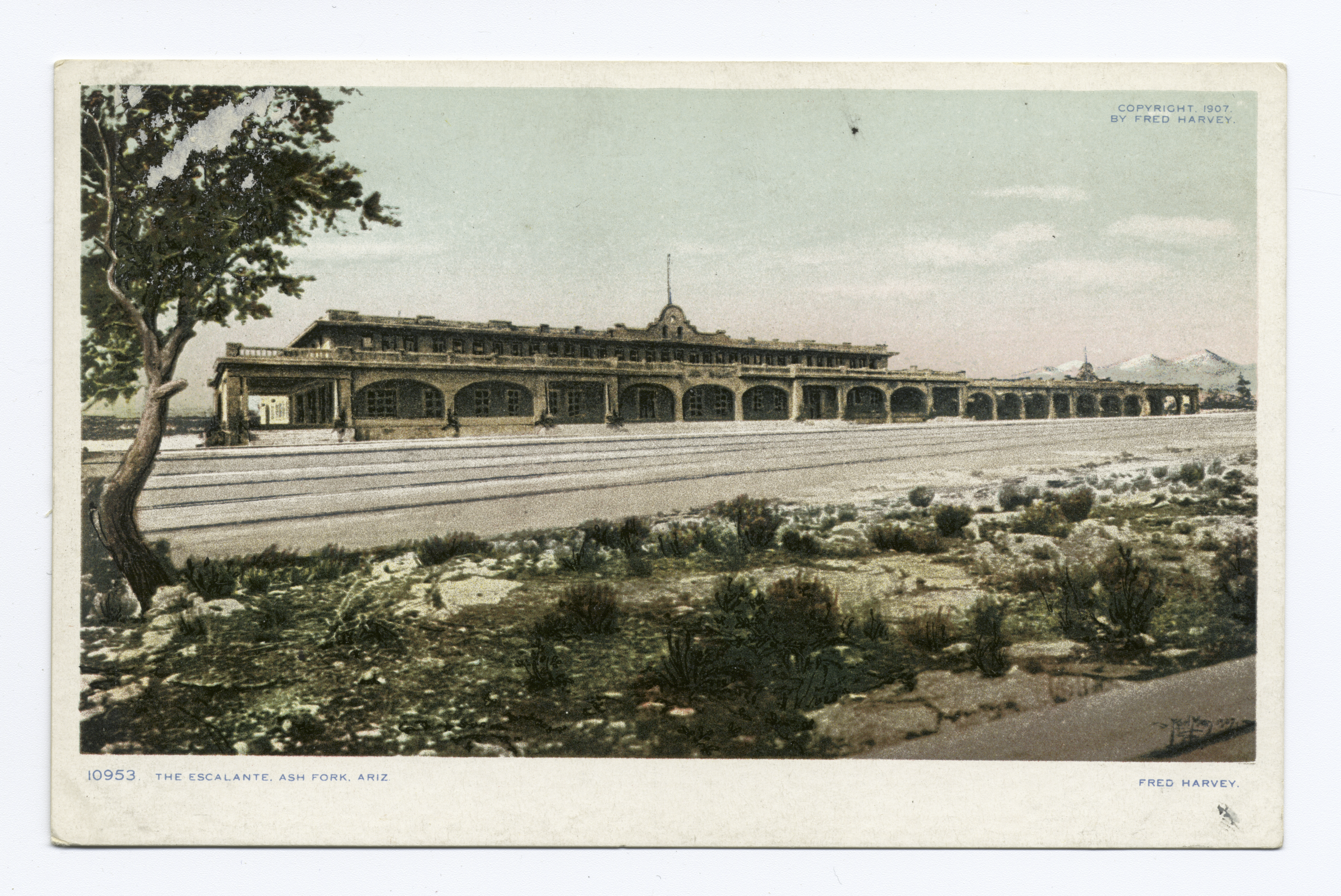
- The Escalante, early 20th century postcard

General information
- Location: BL 40 (Lewis Avenue); Ash Fork, Arizona
- Coordinates: 35.225828°N 112.488155°W
- System: Former ATSF station
- Owner: BNSF Railway
- Lines: Main Line (1882–1960); Santa Fe, Prescott and Phoenix Railway (Phoenix Branch)
- Tracks: 2

Construction
- Structure type: at-grade

History
- Opened: 1893 (first station), 1907 (second station)
- Closed: 1905 (first station), 1969 (second station)

Former services
Preceding station	Atchison, Topeka and Santa Fe Railway	Following station
Seligman toward Los Angeles	Main Line	Williams toward Chicago
Terminus	Santa Fe, Prescott and Phoenix Railway	Drake toward Phoenix
Location

Ash Fork Station is a former railway station of the Atchison, Topeka and Santa Fe Railway, located in Ash Fork, Yavapai County, Arizona. The large and "grand" Harvey House Escalante Hotel and restaurant were part of the station complex.

Service to Ash Fork began in the early 1880s when the Atlantic and Pacific Railroad (predecessor of the Santa Fe) built through town, then in the Arizona Territory. After the completion of a line in 1895—the Santa Fe, Prescott and Phoenix Railway—to Phoenix, Ash Fork became an important junction point for the Santa Fe.

== History ==
The first station in Ash Fork was an 1893 structure made out of red Coconino sandstone, and built in the same style as the current Flagstaff station. The structure was one of the first built by the railroad and became too small to handle the number of passengers at Ash Fork. It was destroyed in a 1905 fire.

Built in 1907, the second station was built as part of the famous Escalante hotel and restaurant. It was one of the renowned Fred Harvey Company rail passenger Harvey House complexes, built after the founder Fred Harvey died. The cost of construction was $150,000 (equivalent to $5.18 million in 2025 adjusted for inflation). Ash Fork was a restaurant stop Harvey House, all passenger trains stopped so travelers could eat in the Escalante Dining Room or at the Lunch Counter, and shop in the Escalante's Indian Gift Shop.

=== Decline and closure ===
The Escalante Harvey House closed in 1948.

Ash Fork Station's service on the Southern Transcon main line lasted until December 1960, when the Santa Fe completed the Crookton Cutoff around Ash Fork. This was done to avoid the steep Johnson Canyon, west of Ash Fork. The junction point shifted to Williams Junction and the line to Phoenix became the only service through the town. The former main line west of Ash Fork was abandoned. This, combined with I-40 bypassing the town, began the decline of Ash Fork.

The final regular passenger service to Ash Fork ended in April 1969, when train number 42, the Hassayampa Flyer, was discontinued. The Escalante Harvey House building was demolished in the 1960s. The former freight house is the only still standing structure on the site.

== Gallery ==
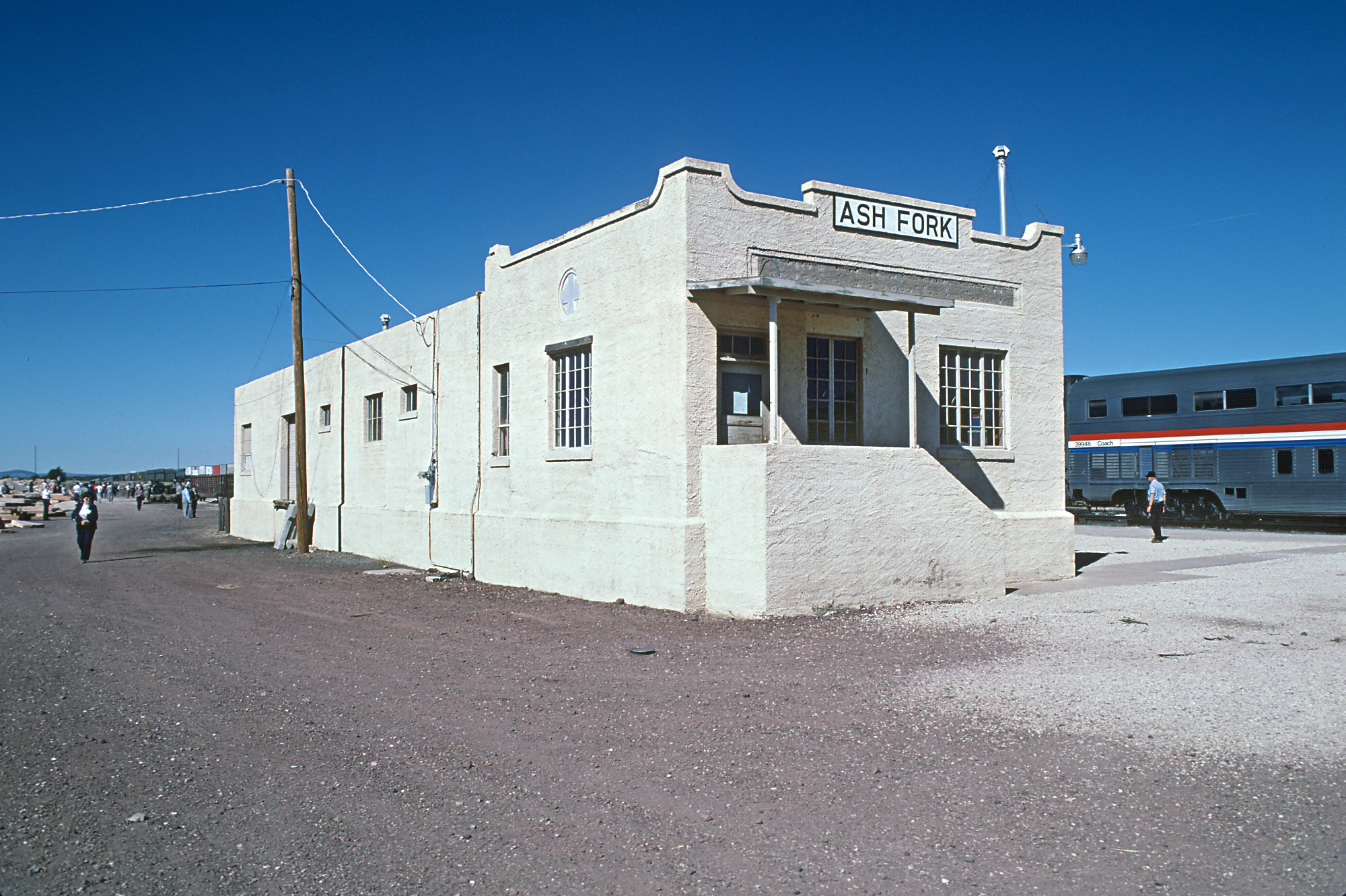
The former freight house in 1985

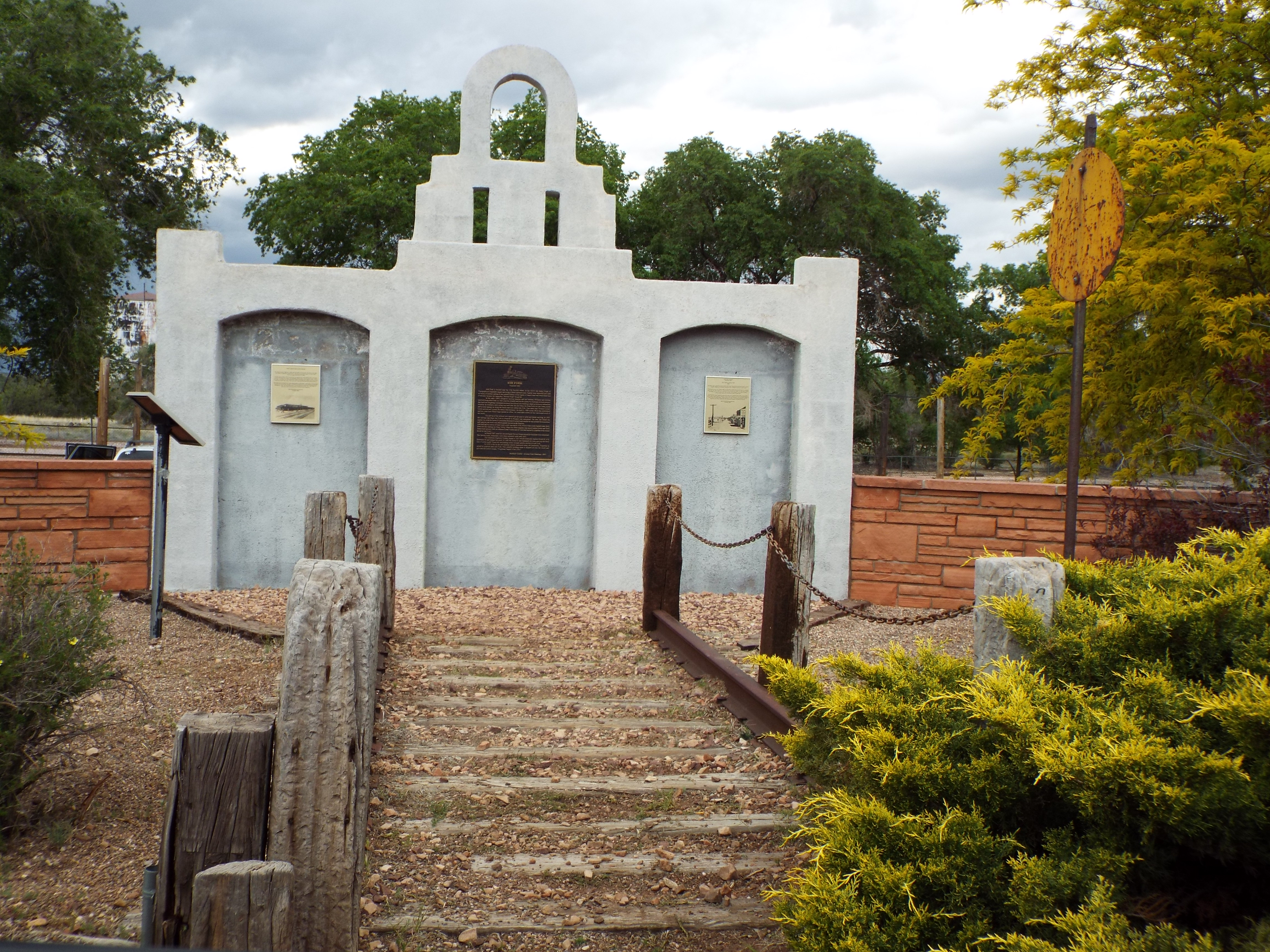
A historical marker at the site of the station and hotel

== See also ==
- Santa Fe, Prescott and Phoenix Railway
- Phoenix Subdivision (BNSF Railway)
- U.S. Route 66 in Arizona
