= Grand Canyon Railway =

Historic railway to Grand Canyon National Park in Arizona

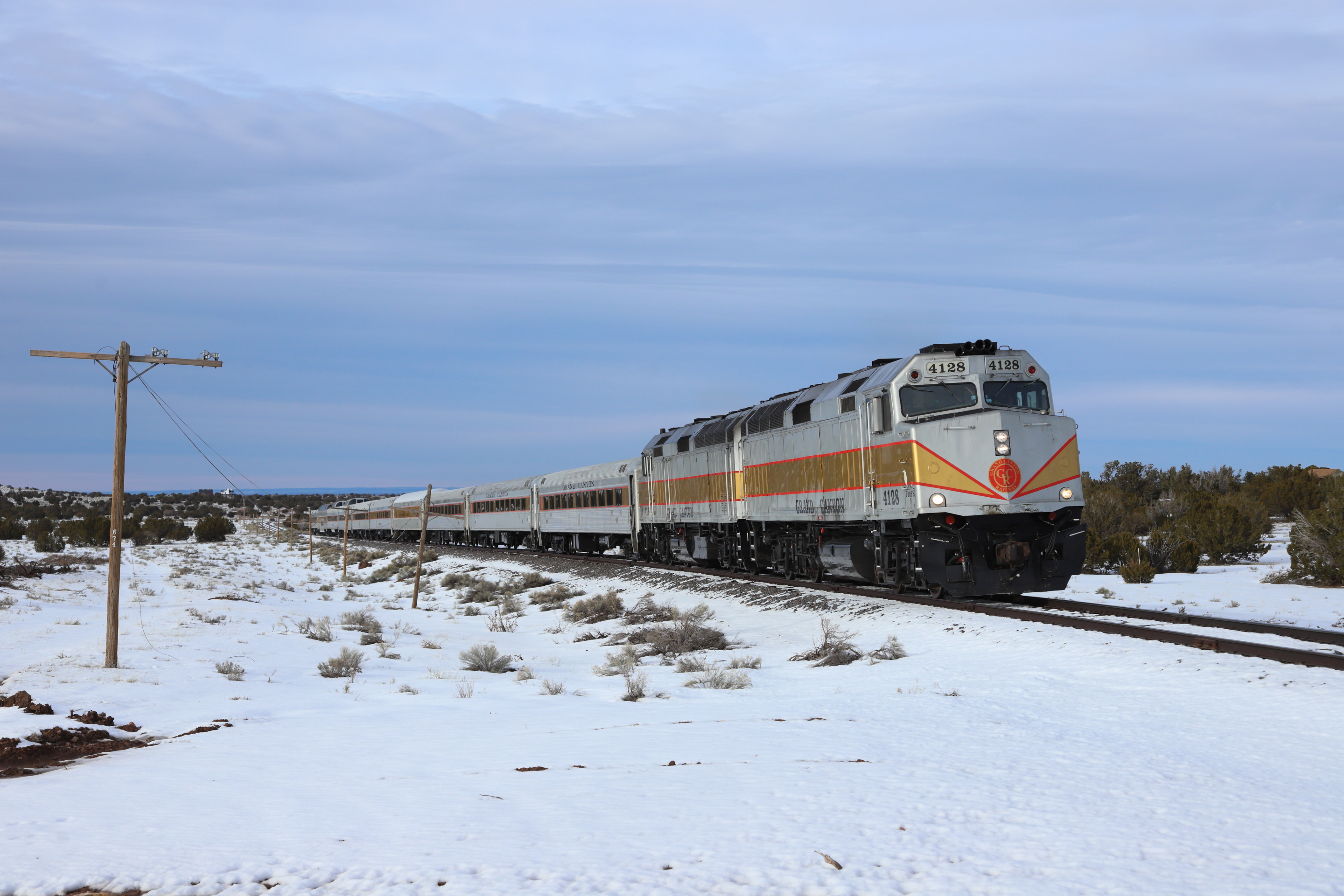
- EMD F40FH locomotive No. 4128 leading a passenger excursion on the Grand Canyon Railway, March 2023
- Locale: Coconino County, Arizona, U.S.
- Terminus: Grand Canyon Depot; Williams Depot

Commercial operations
- Built by: Atchison, Topeka and Santa Fe Railway
- Original gauge: 4 ft 8 1/2 in (1,435 mm) standard gauge

Preserved operations
- Owned by: Xanterra Travel Collection
- Reporting mark: GCRY
- Stations: 2
- Length: 64 mi (103 km)

Commercial history
- Opened: 1901
- Closed to passengers: 1968
- Closed: 1974

Preservation history
- 1988: Purchased by Max and Thelma Biegert
- 1989: Reopened
- 2006: Purchased by Xanterra
- Headquarters: Williams, Arizona

Website
- thetrain.com
Route maps
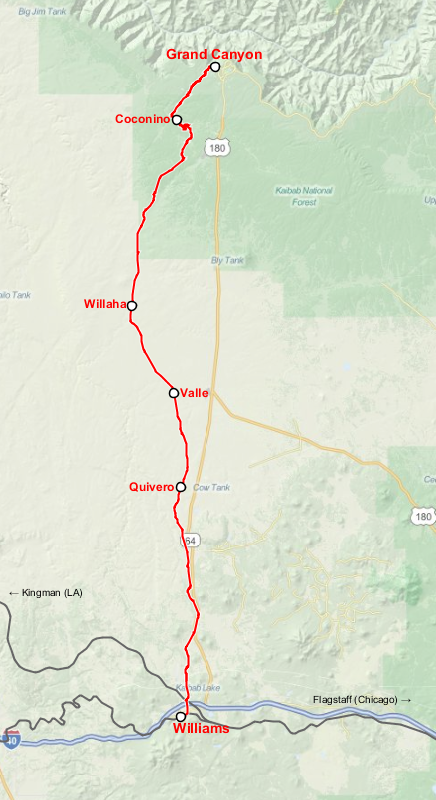

The Grand Canyon Railway (reporting mark GCRX) is a heritage railroad which carries passengers between Williams, Arizona, and the South Rim of Grand Canyon National Park.

The 64-mile (103 km) railroad, built by the Atchison, Topeka and Santa Fe Railway, was completed on September 17, 1901. The arrival of trains led increased tourism to the area, and the railway company was instrumental in the creation of the Grand Canyon Village to serve guests. Declining ridership due to the increasing usage of the automobile led the Atchison, Topeka and Santa Fe Railway to cease passenger service of the Grand Canyon Railway in July 1968 and freight service on the line ended in 1974.

Private investors purchased the line in 1988, restored the facilities, and started running passenger trains again on September 17, 1989. Today, the railroad carries hundreds of passengers to and from the canyon every day and operates year-round.

The entire Grand Canyon Railway has been added to the National Register of Historic Places, recognizing the contribution the train has made to the history of the United States.

== History ==
=== Santa Fe ownership ===
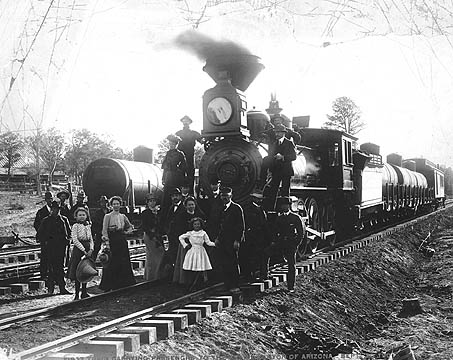
Inaugural run, September 1901

In 1901, the Atchison, Topeka and Santa Fe Railway completed a branch line from Williams to Grand Canyon Village at the South Rim. The first scheduled train to carry paying passengers of the Grand Canyon Railway arrived from Williams on September 17 of that year. The 64-mile (103-kilometer) long trip cost $3.95, and naturalist John Muir later commended the railroad for its limited environmental impact. To accommodate travelers, the Santa Fe designed and built the El Tovar Hotel, located just 20 feet (6.1 meters) from the Canyon Rim. El Tovar opened its doors in January 1905.

Competition with the automobile forced the Santa Fe to cease operation of the Grand Canyon Railway in July 1968 (only three passengers were on the last run), although Santa Fe continued to use the tracks for freight until 1974.

Plans by entertainer Arthur Godfrey to resume service in 1977 fell through. In addition, two other companies attempted to resurrect the line in 1980 and 1984, with each attempt helping to maintain interest in preserving the line and saving it from scrapping.

=== Max and Thelma Biegert ownership ===
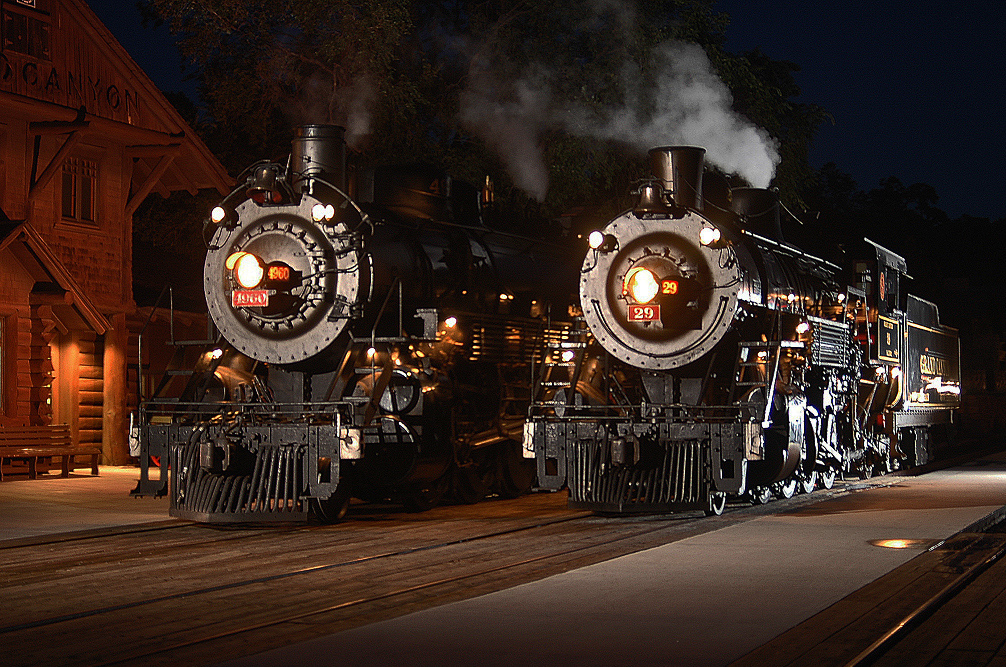
Steam locomotives GCRX 29 and 4960 in a rare joint appearance at Grand Canyon Depot, 2005.

In 1988, the line was bought by Max and Thelma Biegert. The railway was restored and in 1989 began operations as a separate company, independent of the Santa Fe. The first run of the restored railroad was on September 17, 1989, commemorating the September 17 debut of the original railroad.

The Biegerts, a couple originally from Nebraska, had made their fortune in crop dusting through Biegert Aviation, founded in 1947, which had a large federal government contract for its B-17 and later C-54 fleet. After leaving the crop-dusting business, they operated a for-profit day care business in Houston, Texas, which became the Children's World Learning Center and is now part of KinderCare Learning Centers. The Biegerts never intended to get into the rail business. They had loaned money secured by the tracks to another person for the rail line. When they defaulted the Biegerts took over the line. In conjunction with the startup, the Biegerts were principal investors in the short-lived Farwest Airlines, an air taxi service operating a DHC Dash 7 that was intended to bring tourists from California, Las Vegas and Phoenix to Flagstaff where the passengers would then take the rail line.

The railway originally looked into acquiring and importing some of the China Railways KD7 class 2-8-0s to haul their tourist excursion trains, but they quickly backed out of the deal, due to the Tiananmen Square massacre complicating the exporting process.

The first locomotives the railway acquired were a pair of EMD GP7u units from the Santa Fe, as well as four 2-8-0 consolidation steam locomotives formerly operated by the Lake Superior and Ishpeming Railroad. In the early 1990s, the Grand Canyon Railway purchased a fleet of 1950s-era MLW FPA-4 Diesel-electric locomotives, featuring an iconic "snub nose" design. The fleet consisted of two cab-equipped lead A unit models and two cabless booster B unit models. The new locomotives supplemented the fleet of steam locomotives and allowed the railway to grow into a year-round operation. In 1996, the railway boosted their steam roster by rebuilding a 2-8-2 Mikado; former Chicago Burlington and Quincy 4960, a locomotive with a long history of excursion service.

The MLW FPA-4 locomotives lacked the features found in more modern units, such as increased horsepower and dynamic brakes. Therefore, in February 2003, the Grand Canyon Railway purchased three late-1970s F40PH locomotives from Amtrak and placed them into service in 2004.

In March 2006, owners Max and Thelma Biegert announced to the media that they were placing the railroad and its associated restaurants, hotels and amenities up for sale. The combined properties had an annual revenue of nearly $40 million. The Biegerts sought a new buyer/operator with a possible theme park background, which would ensure that the railroad, hotels, RV park, restaurants (and a possible new amusement park in Williams) would continue to be operated as one entity.

=== Xanterra ownership ===
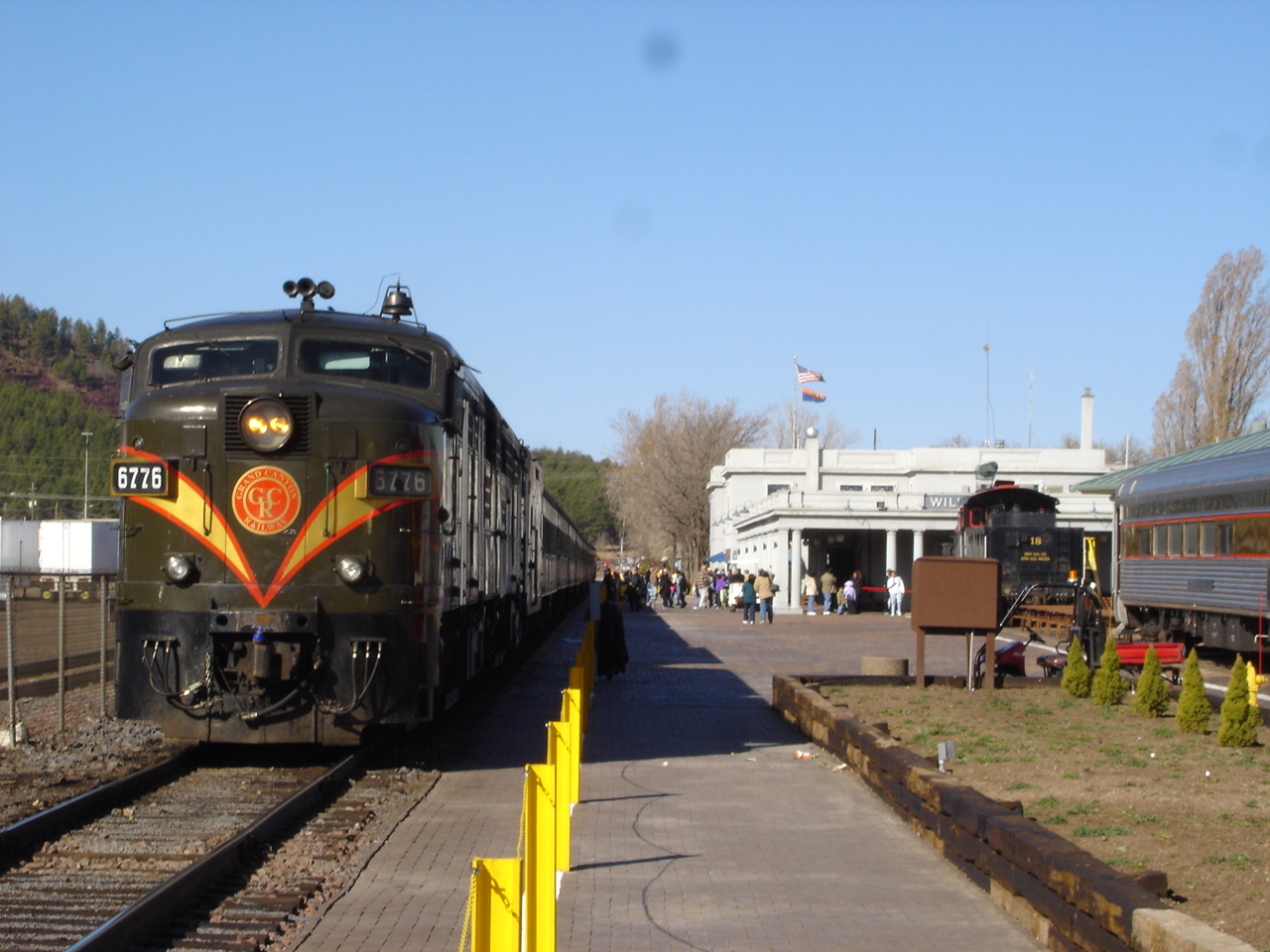
No. 6776 with an excursion train at the Williams Depot, April 2006

On September 21, 2006, it was announced that Xanterra Travel Collection, submitted the winning bid (for an undisclosed sum) and was selected as the new owner for the Grand Canyon Railway. Xanterra is the corporate name and identity for what was originally known as the Fred Harvey Company, a company with restaurant, hotel and service ties to the Atchison, Topeka & Santa Fe Railway as far back as 1876.

Xanterra said that it intended to keep all 480 of the railway's current employees, and planned to focus on growing the business and increasing the coordination between the railway and Xanterra's other services in the Grand Canyon National Park's South Rim. In the press release, the railway and Xanterra reported over 225,000 passengers and over $38 million in revenue in calendar year 2005. The purchase of the GCR included all of the railway's assets, depots, hotels, RV park, rolling stock, shops and the land on which the 65-mile (105 km) line operates over.

Steam locomotive operations on the Grand Canyon Railway were suspended in September 2008. Xanterra cited extra diesel fuel costs and environmental concerns as the reason for the decision, pointing out that each roundtrip of a steam locomotive consumed 1,450 gallons of diesel fuel (compared to the 550 gallons used by a diesel-electric locomotive) and 1,200 gallons of water. Industry experts said that ridership losses due to the late 2000s recession and rising fuel prices due to the 2000s energy crisis likely contributed to the decision.

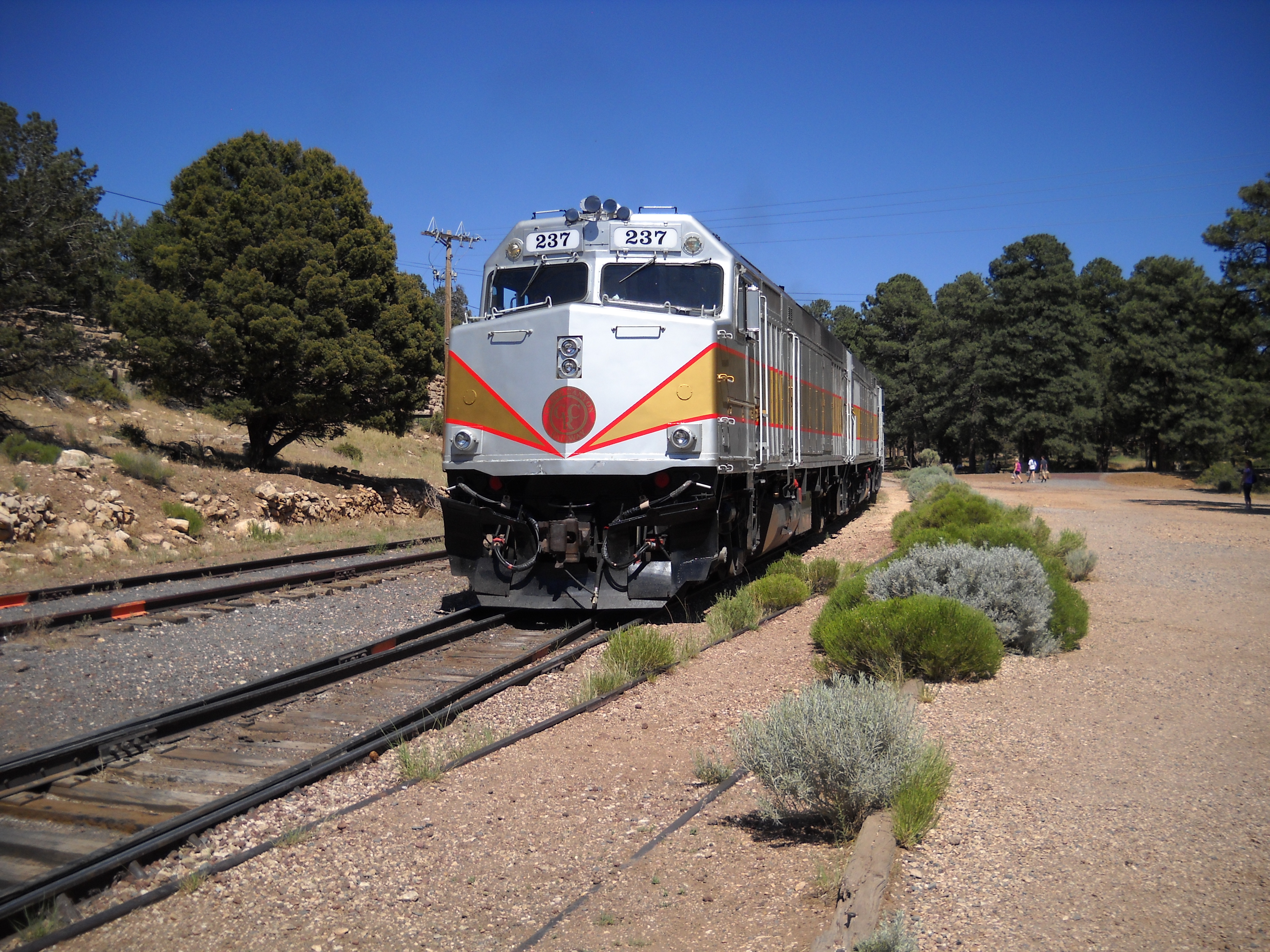
GCRY's F40FH No. 237 at Grand Canyon Village, 2011

Steam locomotives would return to the Grand Canyon Railway on September 19, 2009. Xanterra converted the steam locomotives to operate using waste vegetable oil collected from restaurants across Northern Arizona and installed a rainwater collection system near the maintenance shop to fill boilers when available. Since 2011, special occasion trips, and at least one roundtrip per month during the summer is operated using a steam locomotive. In 2017, the Grand Canyon Railway added to its fleet of diesel locomotives, purchasing two additional F40PH units from New Jersey Transit. As of 2021, the Grand Canyon Railway only has two steam locomotives left in their roster. In 2019, the GCR purchased three Ex-Rio Grande business cars, and since then, the GCR used them exclusively for private charter service, with the option of being pulled by steam or diesel.

On September 19, 2026, Nos. 29 and 4960 ran a doubleheader excursion in celebration of the railroad's 125th anniversary.

== Operations ==
The railroad carries hundreds of passengers to and from the canyon every day, totaling about 225,000 people per year.

The restored Santa Fe Railway Station in Williams serves as the southern terminus for the Grand Canyon Railway and the Grand Canyon Depot, owned by the National Park Service, is the northern terminus for passengers of the line.

Most trains are pulled by the Railway's fleet of F40PH diesel locomotives. They were regeared to run at freight locomotive speeds and have been redesignated as F40FH. Steam locomotives pull trains on special holidays and the first Saturday of the peak travel season (March through October). The Grand Canyon Railway's fleet of historic FPA-4 diesel locomotives also see occasional use.

Passengers ride to and from the Grand Canyon in 1950s era climate-controlled coaches. During the peak travel season, 1920s era Pullman Harriman style coaches with open windows are also available.

The railroad adds to the Old West experience by having actors dressed as bandits stage a mock train robbery during the return trip from the Grand Canyon to Williams.

The Grand Canyon Railway offers at least one daily round trip of its Williams Flyer train between Williams and the Grand Canyon every day except on Christmas Day, December 25. During peak demand periods a second train departure is added.

Train schedule
Station	Time
Leave Williams	9:30 am
Arrive Grand Canyon	11:45 am
Layover (time at Grand Canyon)
Leave Grand Canyon	3:30 pm
Arrive Williams	5:45 pm

Second train schedule (peak demand periods only)
Station	Time
Leave Williams	10:30 am
Arrive Grand Canyon	12:45 pm
Layover (time at Grand Canyon)
Leave Grand Canyon	4:30 pm
Arrive Williams	6:45 pm

During the winter season (November – January), the line runs The Polar Express from Williams to the 'North Pole', a station about 17 miles (30 km) north of town. In 2008, this winter service carried about 78,000 passengers.

The route included stops at Quivero, Valle, Willaha, and Coconino stations.

== Historic designations ==
- Grand Canyon Railway
- U.S. National Register of Historic Places
- U.S. Historic district
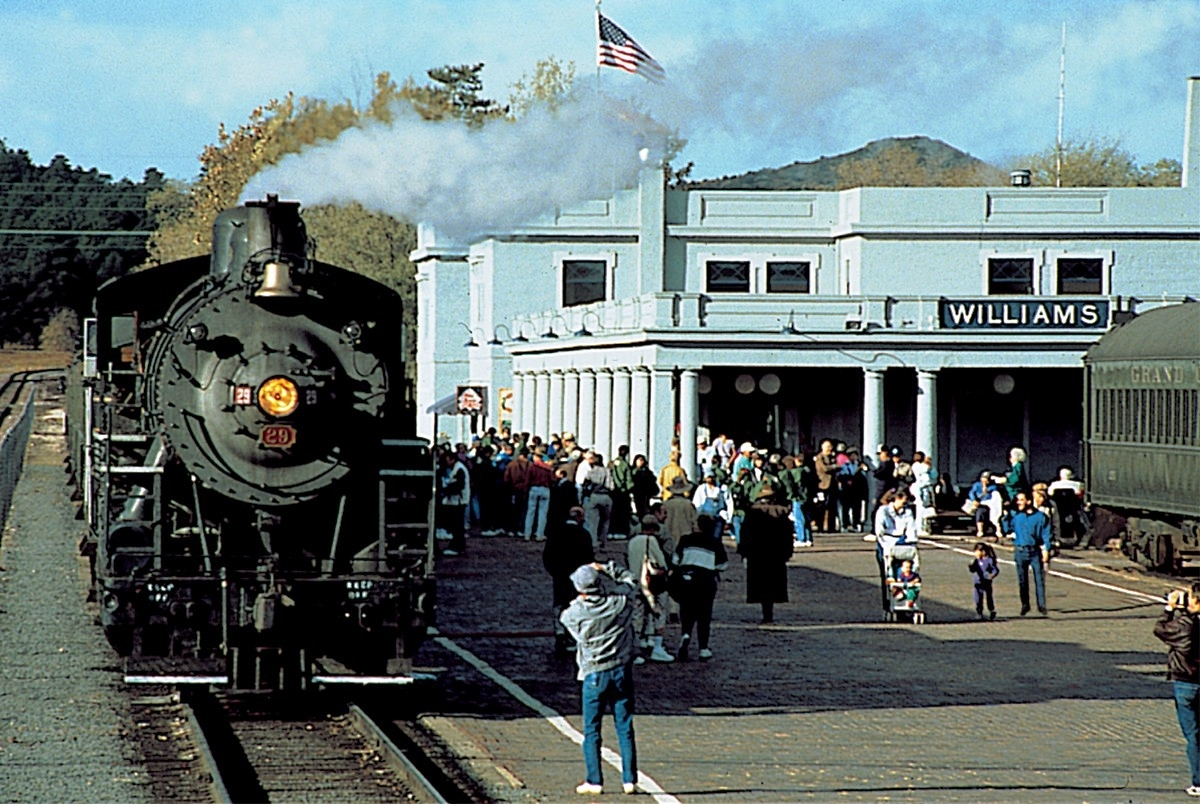
- Williams Depot
- Nearest city: Williams, Arizona
- Area: 1,682 acres (681 ha)
- Built: 1898
- Architects: Santa Fe & Grand Canyon RR; Atchison, Topeka & Santa Fe RR
- Architectural style: Classical Revival
- NRHP reference No.: 00000319
- Added to NRHP: August 23, 2000

The entire Grand Canyon Railway has been added to the National Register of Historic Places for being associated with events that made a significant contribution to the broad patterns of the history of the United States. In the nomination to the register, the railroad was credited with, "Opening up of a large area north of Williams, the building of the Grand Canyon National Park facilities at the south rim, establishment of a solid tourist trade in the American Southwest, support of cattle and sheep ranching, copper and uranium mining, lumber industries, and the building of a sub culture around the railroad that continues to this day."

The Grand Canyon Depot was added to the register on September 6, 1974, while the Williams Depot and the rest of the railroad between Williams and the Grand Canyon National Park was added as a Historic District on August 23, 2000. The Grand Canyon Depot was also designated as a National Historic Landmark on May 28, 1987, for its outstanding historical significance.

== Equipment ==
=== Locomotives ===
Locomotive details
Type	Builder	Model	Image	No.	Built	Former owner	Status
Steam	American Locomotive Company	2-8-0		29	1906	Lake Superior and Ishpeming	Operational
Steam	Baldwin Locomotive Works	2-8-2		4960	1923	Chicago Burlington and Quincy	Operational
Diesel	Electro-Motive Diesel	GP7u		1105 (Note: Built as AT&SF 2750, then to AT&SF 2117, then to Burlington Northern Santa Fe Railway as BNSF 1325 after the merger.)	1952		Operational
Diesel	Electro-Motive Diesel	GP7u		2134	1953		Stored
Diesel	Montreal Locomotive Works	FPA-4		6762	1958	Canadian National, Via Rail, Potomac Eagle Scenic Railroad (6793)	Out of service, used for parts
Diesel	Montreal Locomotive Works	FPA-4		6768	1958	Canadian National, Via Rail, Potomac Eagle Scenic Railroad (6793)	Out of service, used for parts
Diesel	Montreal Locomotive Works	FPA-4		6776	1958	Canadian National, Via Rail, Potomac Eagle Scenic Railroad (6793)	Display
Diesel	Montreal Locomotive Works	FPA-4		6793	1958	Canadian National, Via Rail, Potomac Eagle Scenic Railroad (6793)	Operational
Diesel	Montreal Locomotive Works	FPB-4		6860	1958	Canadian National, Via Rail, Potomac Eagle Scenic Railroad (6793)	Operational
Diesel	Electro-Motive Diesel	F40FH		237	1977	Amtrak	Operational
Diesel	Electro-Motive Diesel	F40FH		239	1977	Amtrak	Operational
Diesel	Electro-Motive Diesel	F40FH		295	1979	Amtrak	Operational
Diesel	Electro-Motive Diesel	F40FH		365 (Note: Originally Amtrak 365, later leased to Virginia Railway Express as VRE V-30, then to Agence metropolitaine de transport as AMT 330. The GCRY finished rebuilding it in 2025.)	1981	Amtrak	Operational
Diesel	Electro-Motive Diesel	F40FH		401	1988	Amtrak	Stored, awaiting restoration
Diesel	Electro-Motive Diesel	F40FH		407	1987	Amtrak	Stored, awaiting restoration
Diesel	Electro-Motive Diesel	F40FH		4124	1981	NJ Transit	Operational
Diesel	Electro-Motive Diesel	F40FH		4128	1981	NJ Transit	Operational

=== Former units ===
Locomotive details
Type	Builder	Model	Image	No.	Built	Former owner	Status	Current owner
Steam	American Locomotive Company	2-8-0		18	1910	Lake Superior and Ishpeming	Undergoing 1,472-day inspection and overhaul	The Maguire Family Foundation
Steam	American Locomotive Company	2-8-0		19	1910	Lake Superior and Ishpeming	Display	City of Frisco, Texas
Steam	American Locomotive Company	2-8-0		20	1910	Lake Superior and Ishpeming	Display	City of Allen, Texas
Steam	American Locomotive Company	2-8-2		539	1917	Northern Pacific, Spokane Portland and Seattle	Display	Port of Kalama, Washington
Diesel	Electro-Motive Diesel	GP7u		2072	1953	Atchison Topeka and Santa Fe	Scrapped	
Diesel	Montreal Locomotive Works	FPA-4		6773	1958	Canadian National, Via Rail	Operational	Cuyahoga Valley Scenic Railroad
Diesel	Montreal Locomotive Works	FPB-4		6871	1958	Canadian National, Via Rail	Undergoing restoration	Cuyahoga Valley Scenic Railroad

=== Rolling stock ===
Rolling stock details
Type	Builder	Model	Image	No.	Built	Name	Heritage	Status	Notes
Steam Generator	Electro-Motive Division			460	1958		Canadian National, VIA Rail	Operational	No. 460 was originally numbered 15460 and 480 was originally numbered 15480
Steam Generator	Electro-Motive Division			480	1958		Canadian National, VIA Rail	Operational	No. 460 was originally numbered 15460 and 480 was originally numbered 15480
Passenger Equipment	Budd Company	Observation car		255	1947	Chief	Atlantic Coast Line	Operational	Originally built as a daytime coach, wrecked in San Antonio, Texas in 1999.
Passenger Equipment	Budd Company	Coach		301	1955		Boston and Maine	Operational	Built as an RDC-1
Passenger Equipment	Budd Company	Coach		304	1955		Boston and Maine	Operational	Built as an RDC-1
Passenger Equipment	Budd Company	Coach		305	1955		Boston and Maine	Stored	Built as an RDC-1
Passenger Equipment	Budd Company	Coach		306	1955		Boston and Maine	Operational	Built as an RDC-2
Passenger Equipment	Budd Company	Coach		308	1955		Boston and Maine	Operational	Built as an RDC-2
Passenger Equipment	Budd Company	Coach		309	1955		Boston and Maine	Operational	Built as an RDC-1
Passenger Equipment	Budd Company	Coach		311	1955		Boston and Maine	Operational	Built as an RDC-3
Passenger Equipment	Pullman Company	Coach		2089	1923		Southern Pacific	Operational	Painted in the Polar Express livery.
Passenger Equipment	Budd Company	Dome car		2094	1954	Coconino	Northern Pacific Railway	Operational	
Passenger Equipment	Budd Company	Slumbercoach		2093	1959	Restland	Baltimore & Ohio Railroad	Stored	
Passenger Equipment	Budd Company	Dome car		2097	1955	Kokopelli	Great Northern Railway	Operational	
Passenger Equipment	Pullman Company	Coach		2104	1923		Southern Pacific	Operational	Painted in the Polar Express livery.
Passenger Equipment	Pullman Company	Coach		2117	1923		Southern Pacific	Operational	Painted in the Polar Express livery.
Passenger Equipment	Pullman Company	Coach		2119	1923		Southern Pacific	Operational	Painted in the Polar Express livery.
Passenger Equipment	Pullman Company	Coach		2129	1923		Southern Pacific	Operational	Painted in the Polar Express livery.
Passenger Equipment	Pullman Company	Coach		2128	1923		Southern Pacific	Operational	Painted in the Polar Express livery.
Passenger Equipment	Pullman Company	Coach		2130	1923		Southern Pacific	Operational	Painted in the Polar Express livery.
Passenger Equipment	Pullman Company	Coach		2133	1923		Southern Pacific	Operational	Painted in the Polar Express livery.
Passenger Equipment	Pullman Company	Coach		2152	1923		Southern Pacific	Operational	The only Pullman car on the railroad that is painted in the excursion livery of Silver, Gold and Red.
Passenger Equipment	Budd Company	Sky dome		8742	1955	Fred Harvey	Great Northern Railway	Operational	
Passenger Equipment	Budd Company	Sky dome		8743	1955	Mary Colter	Chicago, Burlington and Quincy	Operational	
Caboose	International Car Company	Class Ce-8 Wide Vision		999727	1978		Atchison, Topeka and Santa Fe	Operational	

=== Former rolling stock ===
Rolling stock details
Type	Builder	Model	Image	No.	Built	Name	Heritage	Status	Current owner
Passenger Equipment	Budd Company	Dome car		1108	1948		Denver and Rio Grande Western Railroad	Under restoration	Illinois Railway Museum

== See also ==
- ATSF Grand Canyon Limited
- Grand Canyon Railway 4960
- Grand Canyon Railway 29
- History of the Grand Canyon area
- List of heritage railroads in the United States
- List of heritage railways

== Bibliography ==
- Bunker, Kevin (July–August 1995). "Conserving a Legend: Arizona's Grand Canyon Railway". Locomotive & Railway Preservation. Pentrex. pp. 30–50.
- Bianchi, Curt (May 1995). "By steam to the Grand Canyon". Trains. Vol. 55, no. 5. Kalmbach Media. pp. 40–44.
- Wrinn, Jim (May 2010). "Grand Canyon goes green". Trains. Vol. 70, no. 5. Kalmbach Media. pp. 26–30.
- Richmond, Al (2018). The Story of Grand Canyon Railway: Cowboys, Miners, Presidents and Kings (2nd ed.). Grand Canyon Conservancy. ISBN 978-1934656914.
- Mitchell, Alexander (September 2019). "Thirty Years of Growth and Change: Grand Canyon Railway". Railfan & Railroad. Vol. 38, no. 9. White River Productions. pp. 47–55.
