= Aultman, Arizona =

Settlement within Camp Verde, Yavapai County, Arizona

- Former populated place
- Location of Aultman in Arizona
- Coordinates: 34°36′59″N 111°54′52″W
- Country: United States
- State: Arizona
- County: Yavapai
- Elevation: 3,281 ft (1,000 m)
- Time zone: UTC-7 (Mountain (MST))
  - Summer (DST): UTC-7 (MST)
- Area code: 928
- FIPS code: 04-04675
- GNIS feature ID: 25847

Aultman was a settlement now within the town of Camp Verde in Yavapai County, Arizona, United States. It has an estimated elevation of 3,281 feet (1,000 m) above sea level.

== History ==
Named after a resident, it had a post office between 1896 and 1916.

In 1910, Aultman was originally planned to be the site of a territorial highway bridge spanning the Verde River. However, a petition circulated in Camp Verde, Arizona, to relocate the highway and bridge to Camp Verde; Camp Verde was selected as the bridge site.

In the 1920s, the Aultman schoolhouse doubled as a polling location.

Aultman's population was 20 in 1940.
