= Allentown, Arizona =

Unincorporated community in the state of Arizona, United States

- Populated place
- Location of Allentown in Arizona Allentown, Arizona (the United States)
- Coordinates: 35°17′31″N 109°09′30″W
- Country: United States
- State: Arizona
- County: Apache
- Elevation: 6,145 ft (1,873 m)
- Time zone: UTC-7 (Mountain (MST))
  - Summer (DST): UTC-7 (MST)
- Area code: 928
- FIPS code: 04-01780
- GNIS feature ID: 24302

Allentown, is a populated place located in Apache County, Arizona, United States. It has an estimated elevation of 6,145 feet (1,873 m) above sea level.

Allentown got its start c. 1881 when the railroad was extended to that point. The community was named after the railroad construction superintendent Allan Johnson, who in later years returned to the area and took to cattle ranching. A post office called Allantown was established in 1924, and remained in operation until 1930.

The site of Allentown is included within the boundaries of the census-designated place of Houck.
