= Ashurst baronets =

Extinct baronetcy in the Baronetage of England

- Escutcheon of the Ashurst baronets of Waterstock
- Creation date: 1688
- Status: extinct
- Extinction date: 1732

The Ashurst Baronetcy, of Waterstock in the County of Oxford, was a title in the Baronetage of England. It was created on 21 July 1688 for Henry Ashurst, Member of Parliament for Truro and Wilton. The second Baronet represented Windsor in Parliament. The title became extinct on his death in 1732.

== Ashurst baronets, of Waterstock (1688) ==
- Sir Henry Ashurst, 1st Baronet (1645–1711)
- Sir Henry Ashurst, 2nd Baronet (c. 1670–1732)
