= Ak Komelik, Arizona =

CDP in Pima County, Arizona

- Populated place
- Location of Ak Komelik in Arizona
- Coordinates: 31°43′04″N 112°12′04″W
- Country: United States
- State: Arizona
- County: Pima
- Elevation: 2,030 ft (620 m)
- Time zone: UTC-7 (Mountain (MST))
  - Summer (DST): UTC-7 (MST)
- Area code: 520
- FIPS code: 04-01125
- GNIS feature ID: 24297

Ak Komelik is a populated place located in Pima County, Arizona. It is a village in the area of the Baboquivari Peak Wilderness in the Papago Indian Reservation. The name means "flats" in the Papago language. The Jesuit missionary Eusebio Kino is believed to have visited the village in 1698 and called it "Cubit Tubig". It has an estimated elevation of 2,034 feet (620 m) above sea level.
