= Sir Henry Ashurst, 2nd Baronet =

British politician

Sir Henry Ashurst, 2nd Baronet (c. 1670–1732), of Waterstock House, Waterstock, Oxfordshire was a British politician who sat in the House of Commons from 1715 to 1722.

Ashurst was the only surviving son of Sir Henry Ashurst, 1st Baronet, MP of Waterstock and his wife Diana Paget, daughter of William Paget, 6th Baron Paget. He probably matriculated at Christ's College, Cambridge in 1687 and was admitted at Middle Temple in 1689. From 1694 to 1710, he was manager of the government lottery. Before 1711, he married Elizabeth Draper, daughter of Sir Thomas Draper, 1st Baronet, of Sunninghill, Berkshire. He succeeded his father in the baronetcy on 13 April 1711.

At the 1715 general election Ashurst stood for Parliament at New Windsor, which was close to his wife's property. He was initially defeated but was returned as Member of Parliament on petition on 14 April 1715. He voted for the Administration in all recorded divisions but did not stand again in 1722.

Ashurst died on 17 May 1732. He had no children and the baronetcy became extinct. Waterstock House, which had been built by his father, passed to William Henry Ashurst (1725–1807), who rebuilt it in 1787.

Parliament of Great Britain
Preceded by Robert Gayer; Christopher Wren	Member of Parliament for New Windsor; 1715–1722; With: Samuel Travers	Succeeded by Charles, Earl of Burford; William, Earl of Inchiquin
Baronetage of England
Preceded by Henry Ashurst	Baronet (of Waterstock); 1711–1732	Extinct
