= Ashurst, Arizona =

- Populated place
- Location within Arizona Location within the United States
- Coordinates: 32°59′03″N 109°55′56″W
- Country: United States
- State: Arizona
- County: Graham
- Elevation: 2,740 ft (840 m)
- Time zone: UTC-7 (Mountain (MST))
  - Summer (DST): UTC-7 (MST)
- Area code: 520
- FIPS code: 04-04475
- GNIS feature ID: 25297

Ashurst is a populated place situated in Graham County, Arizona, United States, and appears on the Eden U.S. Geological Survey Map.

== History ==
Ashurst's population was 95 in 1940.
