= Henry Ashurst (town clerk) =

Henry Ashurst (1669–1705) was the Town Clerk of London from 1700 to 1705. He served as Member of Parliament for Preston from 1698 to 1702.
