= Ash Fork, Arizona =

CDP in Yavapai County, Arizona

- CDP
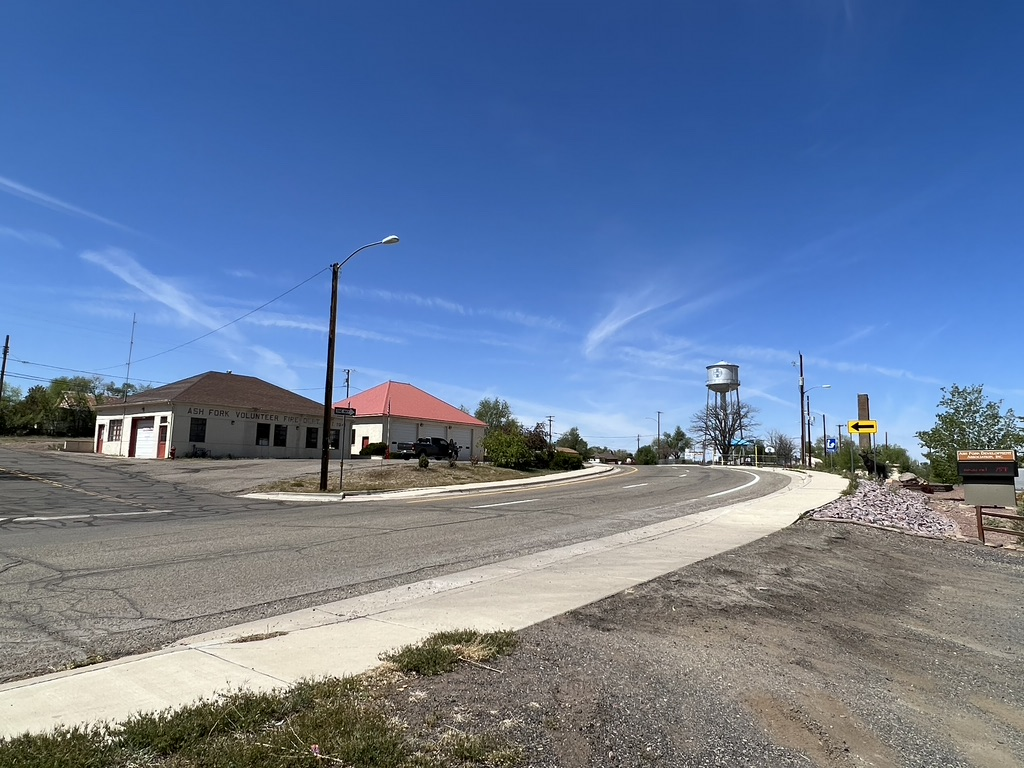
- Route 66 in Ash Fork

- Location in Yavapai County and the state of Arizona

- Location in the United States
- Coordinates: 35°13′02″N 112°29′29″W
- Country: United States
- State: Arizona
- County: Yavapai

Area
  - Total: 2.31 sq mi (5.98 km^{2})
  - Land: 2.31 sq mi (5.98 km^{2})
  - Water: 0 sq mi (0.00 km^{2})
- Elevation: 5,181 ft (1,579 m)

Population (2020)
  - Total: 361
  - Density: 156.5/sq mi (60.41/km^{2})
- Time zone: UTC-7 (MST)
- ZIP code: 86320
- Area code: 928
- FIPS code: 04-04440
- GNIS feature ID: 2407771

Ash Fork is a census-designated place in Yavapai County, Arizona, United States. Its population was 361 at the 2020 census, down from 396 at the 2010 census and 457 in 2000.

== History ==
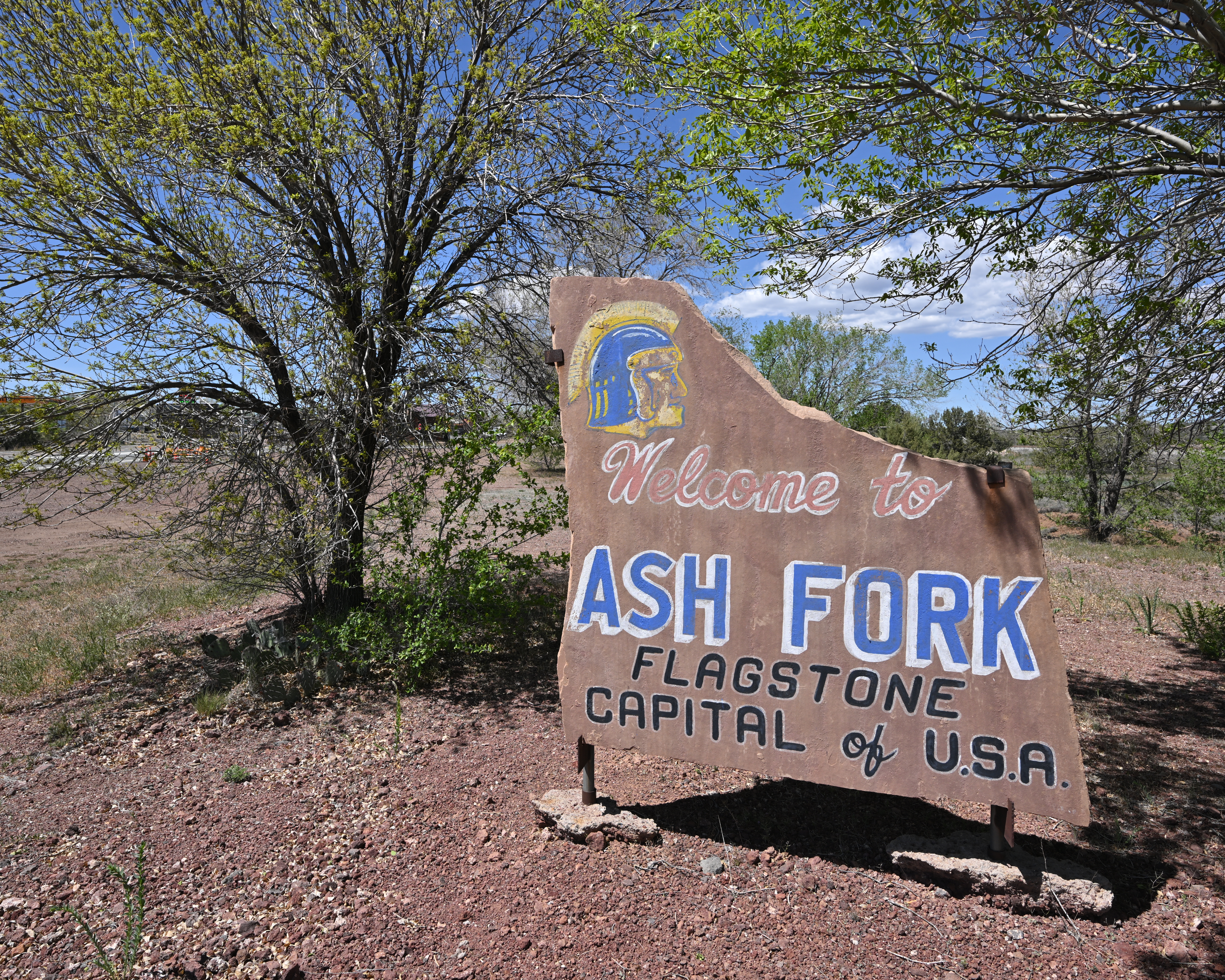
Flagstone welcome sign

Ash Fork has proclaimed itself "The Flagstone Capital of the World", due to the large number of stone quarries and stone yards in and around the town. The title of "Flagstone Capital of the World" was originally bestowed upon Ash Fork by the Ash Fork Development Association and Ash Fork Historical Society. The title was officially bestowed upon the town in 2014 by the Arizona House of Representatives with the passage of H.R. 2001.

The community was established as a siding of the Atlantic and Pacific Railroad, later known as the Santa Fe Railroad, in October 1882. It was purportedly named in 1883 by F.W. Smith, general superintendent of the railroad, in reference to a thicket of ash trees at the site. The first official post office was established on April 12, 1883, with one Henry W. Kline serving as the first Postmaster. Following an uncontrollable fire in 1885, the entire town of Ash Fork burned in 1893, and was rebuilt on the opposite side of the railroad tracks from its original location, where it remains today.

In later years, Ash Fork was the location of the Escalante, a large hotel and "Harvey House" built in 1907 and closed in 1948, operated by the Fred Harvey Company. Ash Fork's convenient location along the railway and later famous U.S. Route 66 made it recognizable to many cross-country travelers, as evidenced by its fleeting mention in several films from the era of classical Hollywood cinema such as 1947's Dark Passage, starring Humphrey Bogart and Lauren Bacall.

U.S. Route 66 provided a slight boost to the town's economy in the 1950s, but construction of the divided highway through the town resulted in the destruction of many of the storefronts, sidewalks, and residential streets, forever altering the aesthetic qualities of the downtown area. When the Santa Fe Railroad moved its main line north and away from the town in 1960, Ash Fork lost nearly half its population, as most families employed by the railway were forced to leave the area.

Another large fire, known locally as the "Big Fire", devastated the community on November 20, 1977, destroying most of the downtown businesses. When I-40 bypassed the town soon after, drastically reducing traffic on Route 66, the local economy never fully recovered. The community's last major fire occurred on October 7, 1987, destroying nearly all the remaining buildings along the two-block business district located on the south side of Route 66.

Part of what was once Route 66 still runs directly through Ash Fork, though as a divided highway, with Park Avenue running east and Lewis Avenue running west, both serving as a main thoroughfare. Historic buildings, including a false-front structure and old railroad company houses can be seen along these streets. The majority of the town's limited commercial establishments can be found along Park Avenue. The Ash Fork Post Office was also located on this street. In 2023 the postal service announced that it was relocating because the current facility is too small for its operations. Ground was broken for the new location in February of 2024.

Certain areas of the town were selected to be used as sets in the filming of 1992's Universal Soldier, supposedly due to the extremely low purchase price and poor condition of several buildings, including an old motel, which were blown up for cinematic effect.

== Geography ==
According to the United States Census Bureau, the CDP has a total area of 2.3 sq mi (6.0 km^{2}), all land.

Geologic places of interest include the Cathedral Caves, which are about 10 miles (16 km) west of town off Arizona Road, and Dante's Descent, a 275-foot (84 m) deep sinkhole also known as "Devil's Hole", which is around 5 miles northwest of Ash Fork, off Crookton Road. After its closing by the state, however, Dante's Descent cannot legally be visited by the public. Pictorial and historic documentation of the natural attraction may be found at the Ash Fork Library.

Ash Fork lies near Kaibab National Forest and Coconino National Forest, and international attractions such as the Grand Canyon are roughly an hour's drive away using major roads. Service roads allow swifter access to back areas of Grand Canyon National Park, but may not be open to public thoroughfare.

Approximately 15 miles (24 km) to the north of Ash Fork is Beale Road, which has the distinction of being the first federally funded highway. The internationally renowned U.S. Route 66 also runs directly through the town. Notably, the longest original, uninterrupted stretch of Route 66 still in existence (about 9.6 miles (15.4 km) long) can be found between Ash Fork and Seligman, Arizona, beginning just beyond Ash Fork at Crookton Road. The surrounding geographical area and settlements served as inspiration for the 2006 Pixar film Cars.

=== Climate ===
This region experiences warm (but not hot) and dry summers, with no average monthly temperatures above 89 °F. According to the Köppen climate classification, Ash Fork has a warm-summer Mediterranean climate, Csb on climate maps.

== Demographics ==
Historical population
Census	Pop.	Note	%±
1910	517		—
1920	571		10.4%
1930	894		56.6%
1960	681		—
2000	457		—
2010	396		−13.3%
2020	361		−8.8%
U.S. Decennial Census

Ash Fork (or Ashfork) first appeared on the 1910 U.S. Census as an unincorporated village with 517 residents, the fourth-largest community in Yavapai County (behind Prescott, Jerome, and Humboldt). Although it did not report a separate population for the village, it did report as the Ash Fork precinct in 1920 and 1930 (reporting a majority White population in the latter). The population of Ash Fork was 681 in the 1960 census. In 2000, it was made a census-designated place (CDP).

As of the census of 2000, 457 people, 149 households, and 109 families were residing in the CDP. The population density was 199.1 people.sq mi (76.7/km^{2}). The 189 housing units had an average density of 82.3/sq mi (31.7/km^{2}). The racial makeup of the CDP was 96.3% White, 1.3% Native American, 1.5% from other races, and 0.9% from two or more races. Hispanics or Latinos of any race were 51.4% of the population.

Of the 149 households, 35.6% had children under 18 living with them, 54.4% were married couples living together, 6.7% had a female householder with no husband present, and 26.2% were not families. About 22.1% of all households were made up of individuals, and 10.1% had someone living alone who was 65 or older. The average household size was 3.07, and the average family size was 3.45.

In the CDP, the age distribution was 28.7% under 18, 13.6% from 18 to 24, 25.2% from 25 to 44, 21.4% from 45 to 64, and 11.2% who were 65 or older. The median age was 34 years. For every 100 females, there were 161.1 males. For every 100 females age 18 and over, there were 143.3 males.

The median income for a household in the CDP was $30,893, and for a family was $36,875. Males had a median income of $23,854 versus $21,094 for females. The per capita income for the CDP was $11,802. About 16.5% of families and 20.4% of the population were below the poverty line, including 27.1% of those under age 18 and 18.4% of those age 65 or over.

The numerous flagstone quarries and companies are often cited as the largest employers in the area, as is the local school district, to which most teachers commute from nearby cities.

Racial Composition
Race (NH = Non-Hispanic)	% 2020	% 2010	% 2000	Pop. 2020	Pop. 2010	Pop. 2000
White Alone (NH)	46.8%	54.5%	46.8%	169	216	214
Black or African American Alone (NH)	0%	0.8%	0%	0	3	0
Native American Alone (NH)	0.6%	1.5%	0.9%	2	6	4
Asian Alone (NH)	0%	0%	0%	0	0	0
Pacific Islander Alone (NH)	0%	0%	0%	0	0	0
Some Other Race Alone (NH)	0%	0%	0%	0	0	0
Multiracial (NH)	7.5%	1%	0.9%	27	4	4
Hispanic (Any race)	45.2%	42.2%	51.4%	163	167	235

== Education ==
It is in the Ash Fork School District.

== Notable people ==
- Lee Patton, former coach at Ash Fork High School, legendary basketball coach at West Virginia University.
- Marshall Trimble, Arizona's official historian

== See also ==
- National Register of Historic Places listings in Yavapai County, Arizona
