= List of people from Provo, Utah =

This is a list of notable people from Provo, Utah. This list includes notable individuals born and raised in Provo, those who currently live in Provo, and those who lived for a significant period in Provo.

== Notable people ==
- The Aces, indie pop/alternative pop band
- Tyson Apostol (b. 1979), contestant on reality TV show Survivor: Tocantins, Survivor: Heroes vs. Villains, and winner of Survivor: Blood vs. Water
- Lindsay Arnold (b. 1994), ballroom dancer on Dancing With the Stars
- Rylee Arnold (b. 2005), ballroom dancer on Dancing With the Stars
- Earl W. Bascom (1906–1995), rodeo champion, inventor, sculptor, actor, inductee of 11 halls of fame, "father of modern rodeo"
- Clyde Bawden, composer and performer of contemporary Christian music.
- Robbie Bosco (b. 1963), former BYU football player
- Paul D. Boyer (1918–2018), recipient of 1997 Nobel Prize in Chemistry
- D. J. Butler, science fiction and fantasy writer
- Stephen Covey, educator
- John Curtis, U.S. senator; former U.S. congressman and mayor of Provo
- Richard Davies, actor
- LaVell Edwards, BYU football Hall of Fame coach
- Paul Engemann, pop musician best known for his 1983 song "Scarface (Push It to the Limit)"
- Avard Fairbanks, sculptor
- Jane Hedengren, track and field athlete
- Tom Holmoe, former BYU football and San Francisco 49er player; current BYU athletic director
- Julianne Hough, professional ballroom dancer on Dancing with the Stars, actress, singer
- Imagine Dragons, an indie rock band whose debut album Night Visions peaked at #2 on the Billboard 200
- Joshua James, folk singer and founder of Northplatte Records
- Merrill Jenson, composer
- Bryan Johnson, entrepreneur and anti-aging practitioner
- Jenna Johnson, dancer on Dancing with the Stars
- Brian Kershisnik, artist
- Goodwin Knight, governor of California 1953-59
- Vance Law, Major League Baseball player
- Vern Law, Major League Baseball player
- Mike Lee, U.S. senator
- Rocky Long, defensive coordinator for the Syracuse Orange
- Bert McCracken, born in Provo, lead singer of Utah-based band The Used
- Kurt Mortensen, author
- Neon Trees, new wave, synthpop-rock band
- Dallin H. Oaks, member of the Quorum of the Twelve Apostles of the Church of Jesus Christ of Latter-day Saints
- The Osmonds raised all nine children in Provo, some of whom continue to live there.
  - The Osmond Brothers, vocal group, band
  - Donny Osmond, singer, musician, actor
  - Marie Osmond, singer, author, actress
- Trevor Packer, head of the Advanced Placement program at the College Board
- Jack Paepke, baseball player, coach, manager and scout
- Janice Kapp Perry, composer, LDS musician
- Fred Roberts, NBA player for seven teams including Utah Jazz
- Clarence Robison, Olympian and BYU track coach
- Josh Rohatinsky, BYU cross-country national champion
- Ryan Shupe & the RubberBand, musicians, "Dream Big"
- Roland N. Smoot, U.S. vice admiral
- Beatrice Sparks, author
- Lindsey Stirling, hip-hop violinist
- Suzanne Storrs, 1955 Miss Utah and television actress
- Will Swenson, Tony Award-nominated actor
- Edgar A. Wedgwood, adjutant general of the Utah National Guard
- Brian Wimmer, actor
- Steve Young, quarterback; MVP of Super Bowl XXIX; inductee of Pro Football Hall of Fame and College Football Hall of Fame; record-breaking quarterback for BYU and San Francisco 49ers; television commentator

== See also ==
- Robert Redford, Academy Award-winning actor, film director, and producer, founder of the Sundance Film Festival, and longtime resident and owner of Sundance Ski Resort, located just outside Provo
