= Vivian Park, Utah =

Unincorporated community in the state of Utah, United States

- Unincorporated community
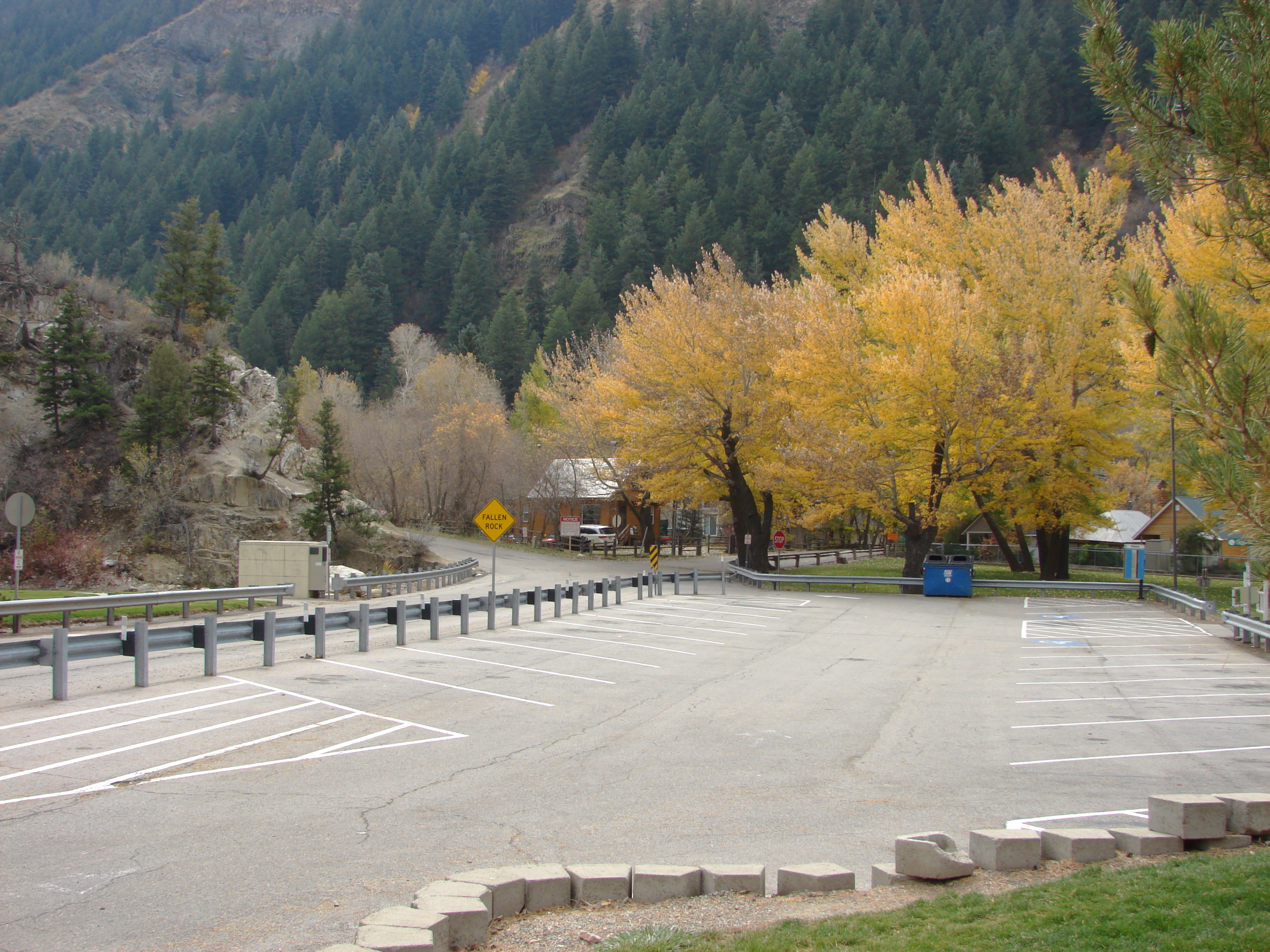
- Looking south along South Fork Road in Vivian Park, October 2015

- Location of Vivian Park within the State of Utah Vivian Park (the United States)
- Coordinates: 40°21′18″N 111°34′27″W
- Country: United States
- State: Utah
- County: Utah
- Elevation: 5,200 ft (1,600 m)
- Time zone: UTC-5 (Mountain (MST))
  - Summer (DST): UTC-4 (MDT)
- ZIP code: 84604
- Area codes: 801 & 385
- GNIS feature ID: 1446943

Vivian Park is an unincorporated community in northeastern Utah County, Utah, United States.

== Description ==
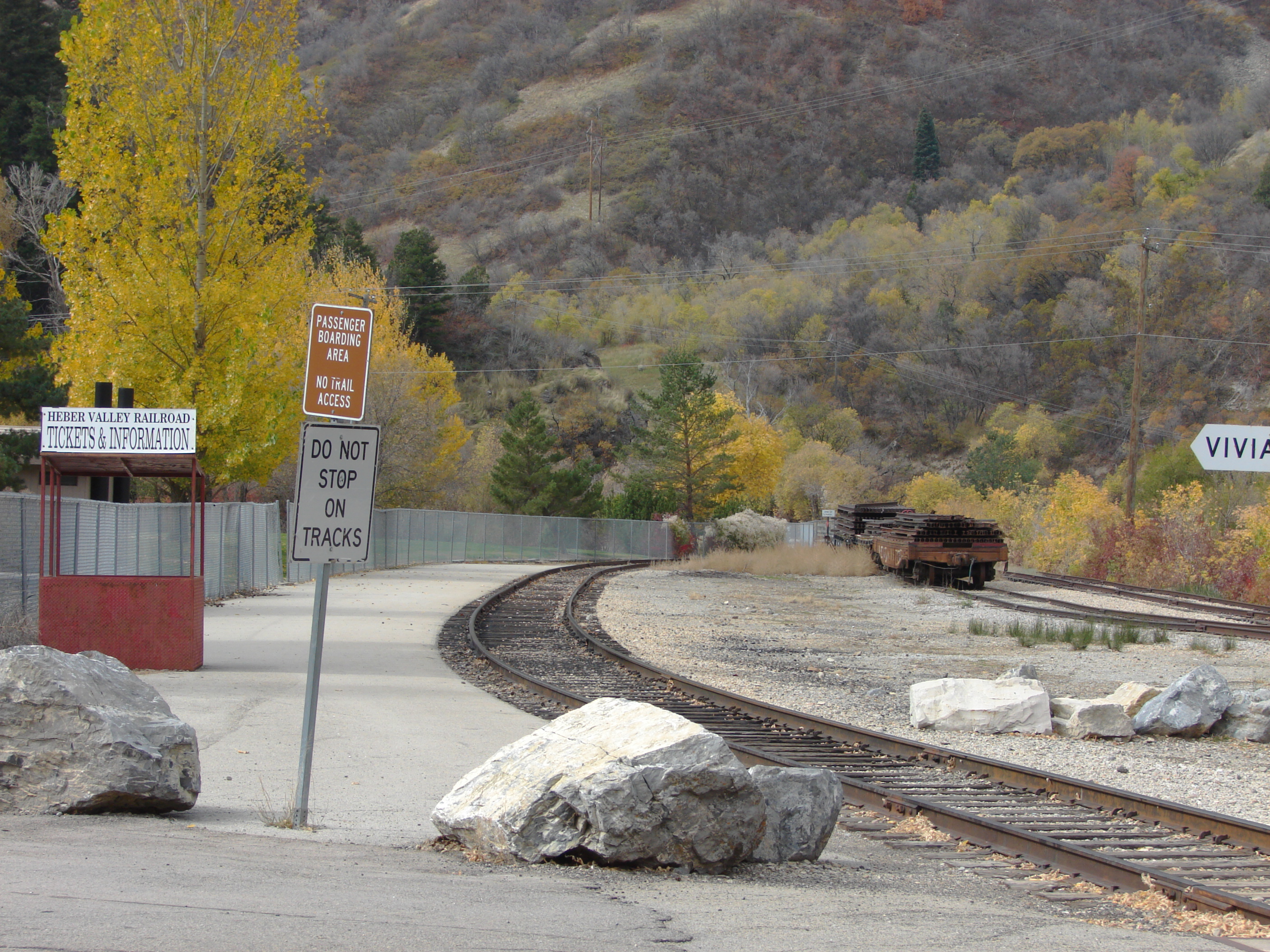
Looking west at the Vivian Park station, October 2015

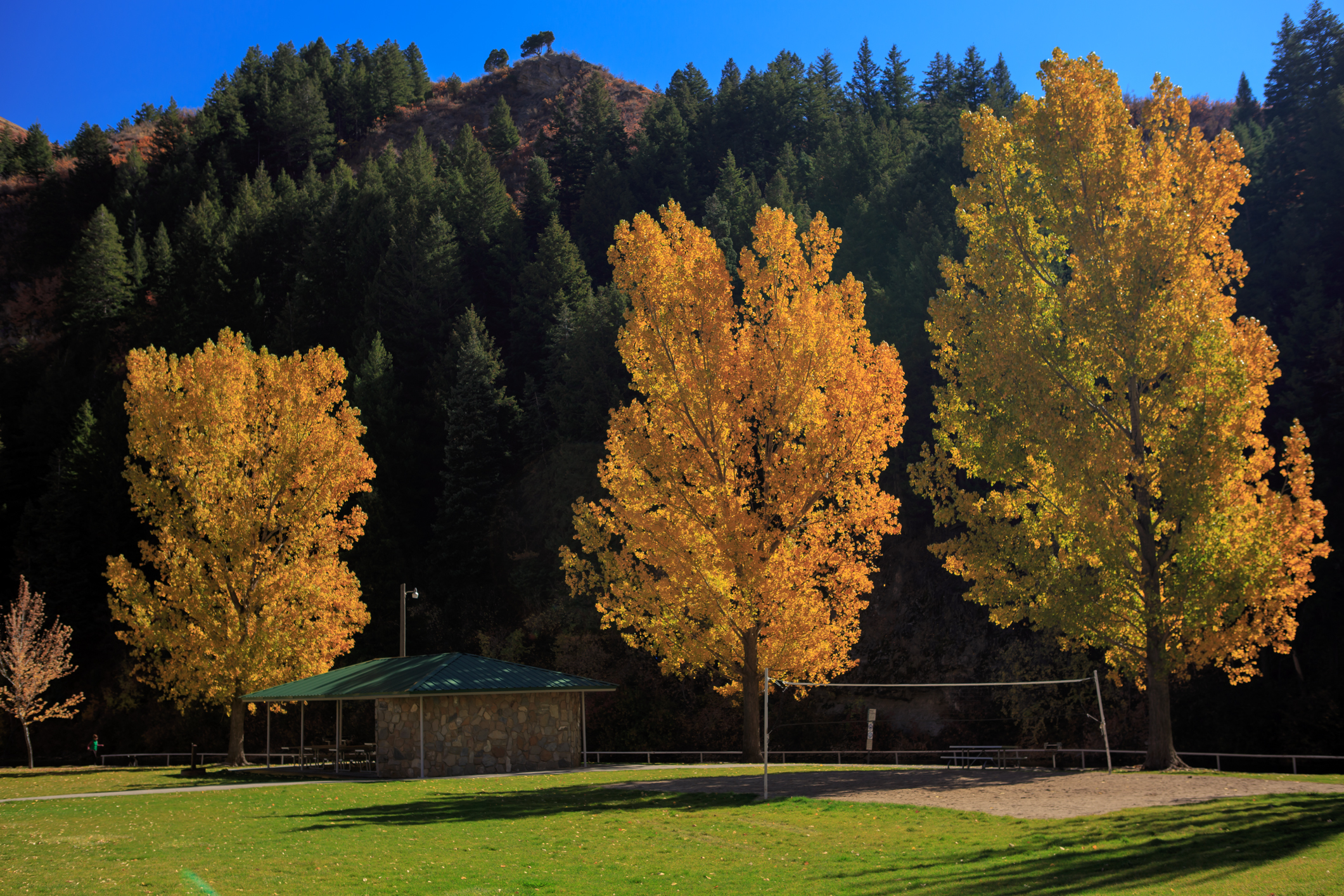
Vivian Park (community park) in Vivian Park, October 2012

The community is located in Provo Canyon along the Provo River and U.S. Route 189, about 12 miles (19 km) northeast of Provo. It is situated between Mount Timpanogos on the northwest, Wildwood on the east, Cascade Mountain on the south, and Bridal Veil Falls on the west. The community was named after Vivian McBride (daughter of the owner of the first grocery store and post office on the Provo East Bench).

When the late Thomas S. Monson (former President of the LDS Church) was a child he would spend summers from the 4th of July to Labor Day at Vivian Park. He owned the family cabin there until he died.

The Vivian Park station is the western terminus of the Heber Valley Railroad. (The heritage railroad runs east to its main station, and eastern terminus, in Heber City in the Heber Valley.)

== Geography ==
Vivian Park is located at 40°21′18″N 111°34′27″W (40.35496, -111.574083). It lies 5,200 feet (1,600 m) above sea level.

== Demographics ==
Residents of Vivian Park are officially known as "Vivianites".
