= AP World History: Modern =

Advanced Placement course and exam

Advanced Placement (AP) World History: Modern (also known as AP World History, AP World, APWH, or WHAP (/ˈwæp/)) is a college-level course and examination offered to high school students in the United States through the College Board's Advanced Placement program. AP World History: Modern was designed to help students develop a greater understanding of the evolution of global processes and contacts as well as interactions between different human societies. The course advances understanding through a combination of selective factual knowledge and appropriate analytical skills. Most states require a world history class to graduate.

== Course ==
Students formerly studied all of prehistory and history, reviewing material from 8000 B.C.E. to the present day. Starting in the 2019–20 school year, AP World History changed its exam name to AP World History: Modern and limited its assessed course content to history from c. 1200 C.E. to the present. The new exam only includes material from 1200 C.E. onwards. The College Board announced the development of AP World History: Ancient, which focuses exclusively on earlier periods, including prehistory. Students in the United States usually take the course in their sophomore year of high school, although they are not generally required to do so, as some take it in senior or freshman year.

The course is organized around four eras and nine units:

- Period 1 – c. 1200 to c. 1450

Unit 1: The Global Tapestry
Unit 2: Networks of Exchange

- Period 2 – c. 1450 to c. 1750

Unit 3: Land-Based Empires
Unit 4: Transoceanic Interconnections

- Period 3 – c. 1750 to c. 1900

Unit 5: Revolutions
Unit 6: Consequences of Industrialization

- Period 4 – c. 1900 to the present

Unit 7: Global Conflict
Unit 8: Cold War and Decolonization
Unit 9: Globalization

== Exam ==
Section	Number of Questions	Time allotted	Exam Weight
Section I, Part A: Multiple Choice Questions	55 questions	55 minutes	40%
Section I, Part B: Short-Answer Questions	3 questions (2 required questions + 1 chosen from 2 others)	40 minutes	20%
Section II Part A: Document-Based Question	1 question	Recommended 60 minutes (includes 15-minute reading period)	25%
Section II, Part B: Long Essay Question	1 question (3 options)	Recommended 40 minutes	15%

The first section of the AP World History exam consists of 55 multiple choice questions with a 55-minute time limit. Questions in the multiple choice section are unevenly distributed between the nine units.

Unit	Period	Exam Weight
Unit 1: The Global Tapestry	c. 1200 to c. 1450	8–10%
Unit 2: Networks of Exchange	c. 1200 to c. 1450	8–10%
Unit 3: Land-Based Empires	c. 1450 to c. 1750	12–15%
Unit 4: Transoceanic Interconnections	c. 1450 to c. 1750	12–15%
Unit 5: Revolutions	c. 1750 to c. 1900	12–15%
Unit 6: Consequences of Industrialization	c. 1750 to c. 1900	12–15%
Unit 7: Global Conflict	c. 1900 to the present	8–10%
Unit 8: Cold War and Decolonization	c. 1900 to the present	8–10%
Unit 9: Globalization	c. 1900 to the present	8–10%

In 2011, the College Board removed penalties for incorrect answers and reduced the number of answer choices from five to four per question.

The AP World History exam was first administered in 2002. The test underwent a major overhaul for the 2017 exam; however, due to the high number of students that struggled with the free response section, the College Board decided to initiate another round of reform, to be put in effect in May 2018. Currently, it has the same format as AP United States History and AP European History. The exam features a new section (Section I Part B) that requires three short answer questions, one of which is selected from two options. Each question has three parts, making for a total of 9 parts within the SAQ section. Students have forty minutes to answer these questions, and they count for twenty percent of the exam score.

Section II lasts for a total of 100 minutes, and it includes a document-based question (DBQ) and a long essay question (LEQ). Students are allowed to work on either essay within this total time period. The section begins with a 15-minute reading period where students are advised to read both the documents for DBQ. However, students may begin writing during this time; most students take notes on the documents in order to plan out the DBQ. Students are advised to spend 45 minutes writing the DBQ and then 40 writing the LEQ, but there are no rules on when each essay must be worked on. There are three prompts for the LEQ, but only one needs to be chosen. Each LEQ prompt addresses a different period, with one addressing periods 1 and 2, another addressing periods 3 and 4, and a third addressing periods 5 and 6.

The DBQ accounts for 25% of the total exam score, and the LEQ is 15%. The essays are graded out of seven points and six points, respectively. Students are required to analyze and synthesize provided documents for the DBQ, but some outside information is still needed. The LEQ only provides a prompt and no sort of stimulus, so a large amount of outside information is necessary.

=== Grade distribution ===
Final Score	1	2	3	4	5	% of scores 3 or higher	Mean score	Standard deviation	Number of students
2006	24.60%	24.40%	25.40%	15.20%	10.40%	51.00%	2.62	1.29	84,143
2007	21.50%	24.30%	26.10%	16.90%	11.20%	54.20%	2.72	1.28	101,975
2008	25.80%	25.70%	23.40%	16.10%	8.90%	48.40%	2.56	1.27	124,638
2009	24.90%	24.60%	23.40%	16.00%	11.10%	50.50%	2.64	1.31	143,426
2010	26.70%	24.20%	23.80%	15.50%	9.80%	49.10%	2.57	1.29	167,789
2011	26.00%	25.50%	23.00%	16.00%	9.50%	48.40%	2.57	1.29	188,417
2012	17.40%	29.40%	30.50%	15.70%	6.90%	53.10%	2.65	1.14	210,805
2013	20.90%	30.20%	29.40%	13.70%	5.90%	48.90%	2.53	1.14	230,107
2014	17.70%	27.80%	31.90%	16.00%	6.60%	54.50%	2.66	1.14	245,699
2015	18.00%	29.90%	31.40%	14.20%	6.60%	52.10%	2.61	1.13	265,308
2016	19.70%	28.70%	29.40%	15.60%	6.60%	51.60%	2.61	1.16	285,351
2017	15.40%	29.60%	26.70%	19.90%	8.50%	55.00%	2.76	1.18	298,475
2018	15.40%	28.50%	27.40%	19.90%	8.90%	56.20%	2.78	1.19	303,243
2019	15.80%	28.80%	28.00%	18.80%	8.60%	55.30%	2.75	1.18	313,317
2020	13.70%	26.10%	28.20%	22.80%	9.20%	60.20%	2.88	1.18	302,942
2021	19.00%	28.90%	24.00%	18.50%	9.70%	52.20%	2.71	1.24	302,231
2022	14.30%	23.70%	27.00%	21.90%	13.20%	62.10%	2.96	1.25	314,716
2023	13.00%	22.30%	27.40%	21.90%	15.30%	64.70%	3.04	1.25	350,353
2024	8.80%	27.40%	19.60%	32.30%	11.90%	63.80%	3.11	1.19	379,385
2025	9.20%	26.50%	17.00%	33.40%	13.90%	64.30%	3.16	1.22	411,547
2026	8%	26%	16%	36%	14%	66%			443,000

In 2012, the head of AP Grading, Trevor Packer, stated that the reason for the low percentages of 5s is that "AP World History is a college-level course, & many sophomores aren't yet writing at that level." 10.44 percent of all seniors who took the exam in 2012 received a 5, while just 6.62 percent of sophomores received a 5.
