= Heber Valley Railroad =

Historic railroad in Utah

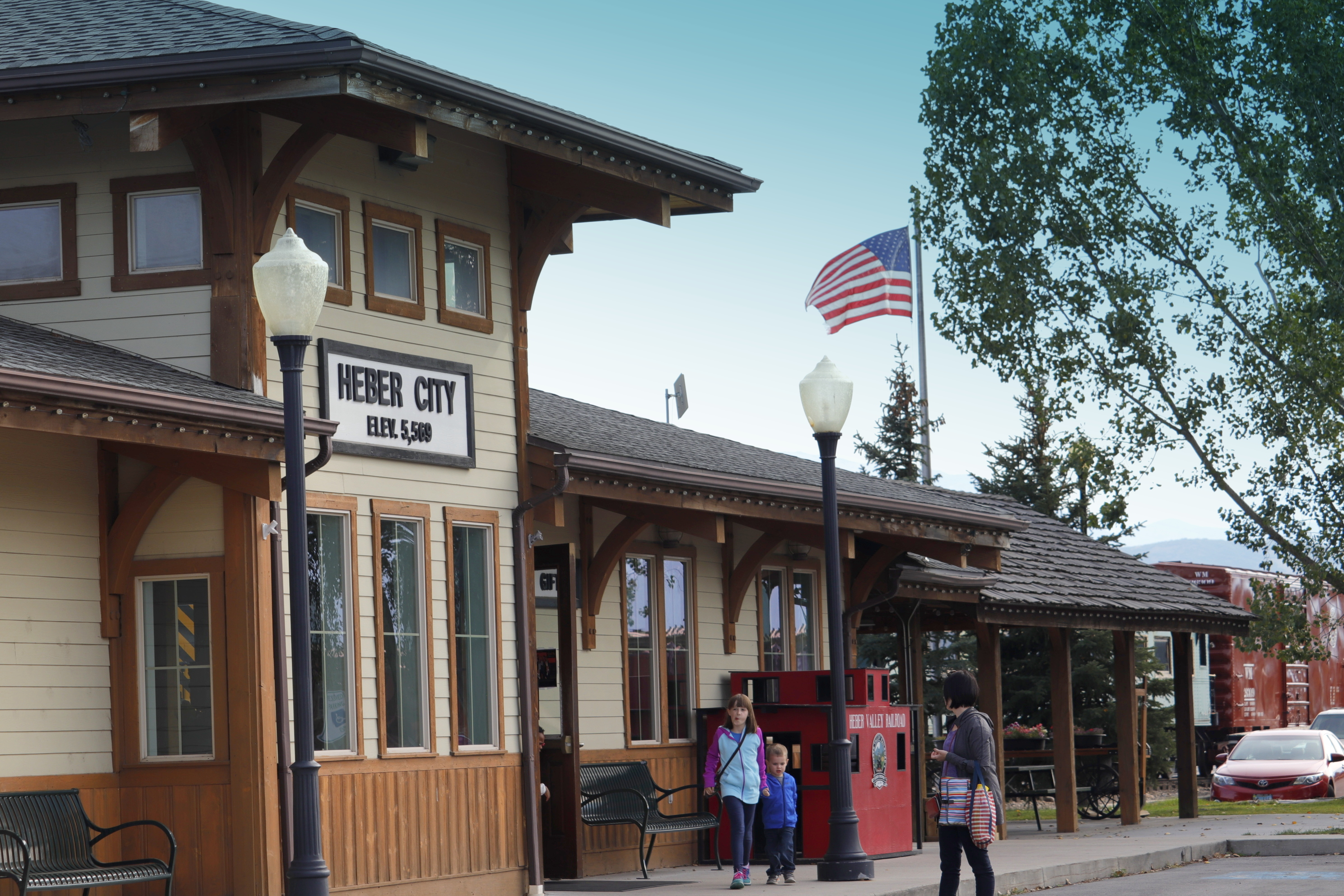
- Locale: Heber City, Utah
- Terminus: Vivian Park, Utah
- Coordinates: 40°30′8.06″N 111°25′28.14″W
- Connections: None

Commercial operations
- Name: Provo Canyon Branch of the Denver and Rio Grande Western Railroad
- Built by: Rio Grande Western & Utah Eastern Railway

Preserved operations
- Operated by: Heber Valley Historic Railroad Authority
- Reporting mark: HVRX

Commercial history
- Opened: 1899
- Closed: 1967
- 1992: Operation as Heber Valley Railroad begins.

Website
- https://www.hebervalleyrr.org/

The Heber Valley Railroad (reporting mark HVRX) is a heritage railroad based in Heber City, Utah. It operates passenger excursion trains along a line between Heber City and Vivian Park, which is located in Provo Canyon. The HVRX carries over 110,000 passengers a year.

The railroad line is approximately 16 miles (26 km) long. A typical round trip ride on the train takes about 90 minutes. There are a total of four passing sidings outside of the Heber yard limit. Notable landmarks seen from the train include Mount Timpanogos, Cascade Mountain, Deer Creek Dam and Reservoir, Provo River, Sundance Ski Resort, Tate Barn, and Soldier Hollow.

== Rio Grande branch line History ==
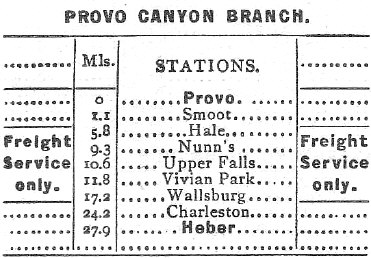
Provo Canyon Branch timetable of the Denver & Rio Grande Western in 1956

The line operated by the HVRX was formerly part of a Denver and Rio Grande Western Railroad branch line that connected Heber City to Provo, Utah. Construction began in 1897 with the branch line was completed in 1899 by the Rio Grande Western. The line was originally proposed as part of the Utah Eastern Railway a RGW backed plan to build a railroad through Provo Canyon and into Colorado via way of the Duchesne River, but this proposal was abandoned leaving the railroad terminus in Heber City.

Ownership of the line passed to the Denver and Rio Grande Railroad (later the Denver and Rio Grande Western) following their merger with the RGW. The Deer Creek Reservoir required rerouting a ten-mile segment of the line in 1941. Freight operations continued regularly until 1966 when regular service was abandoned. The line saw brief use again by the D&RGW in 1968 to haul the National Christmas Tree. After the start of heritage rail services, the D&RGW kept the lower end of the branch line intact until 1971, when it was finally pulled up for scrap.

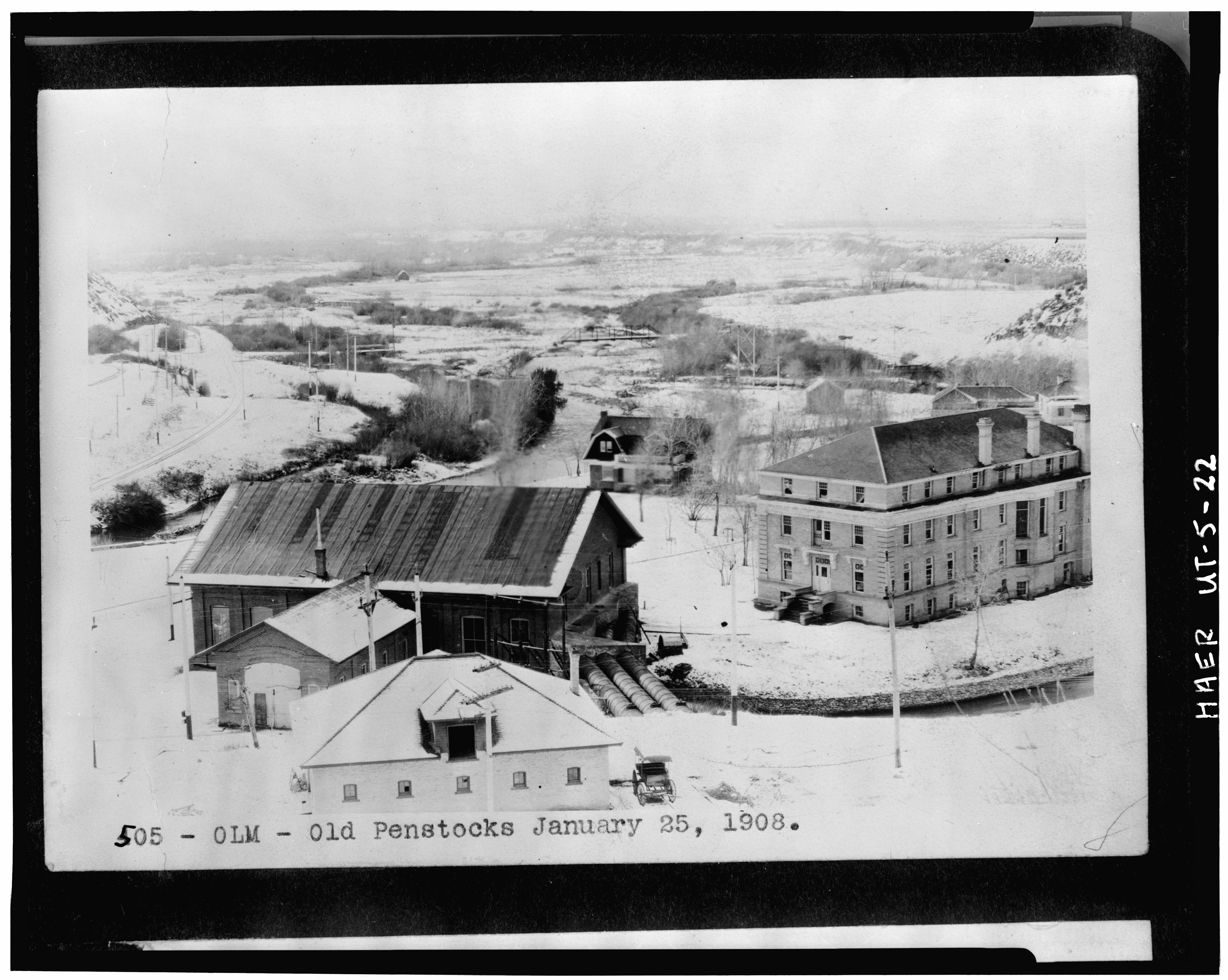
Olmstead Power Plant at entrance of Provo Canyon as seen in 1908, the Provo Canyon Branch can be seen in the upper left side of the photo

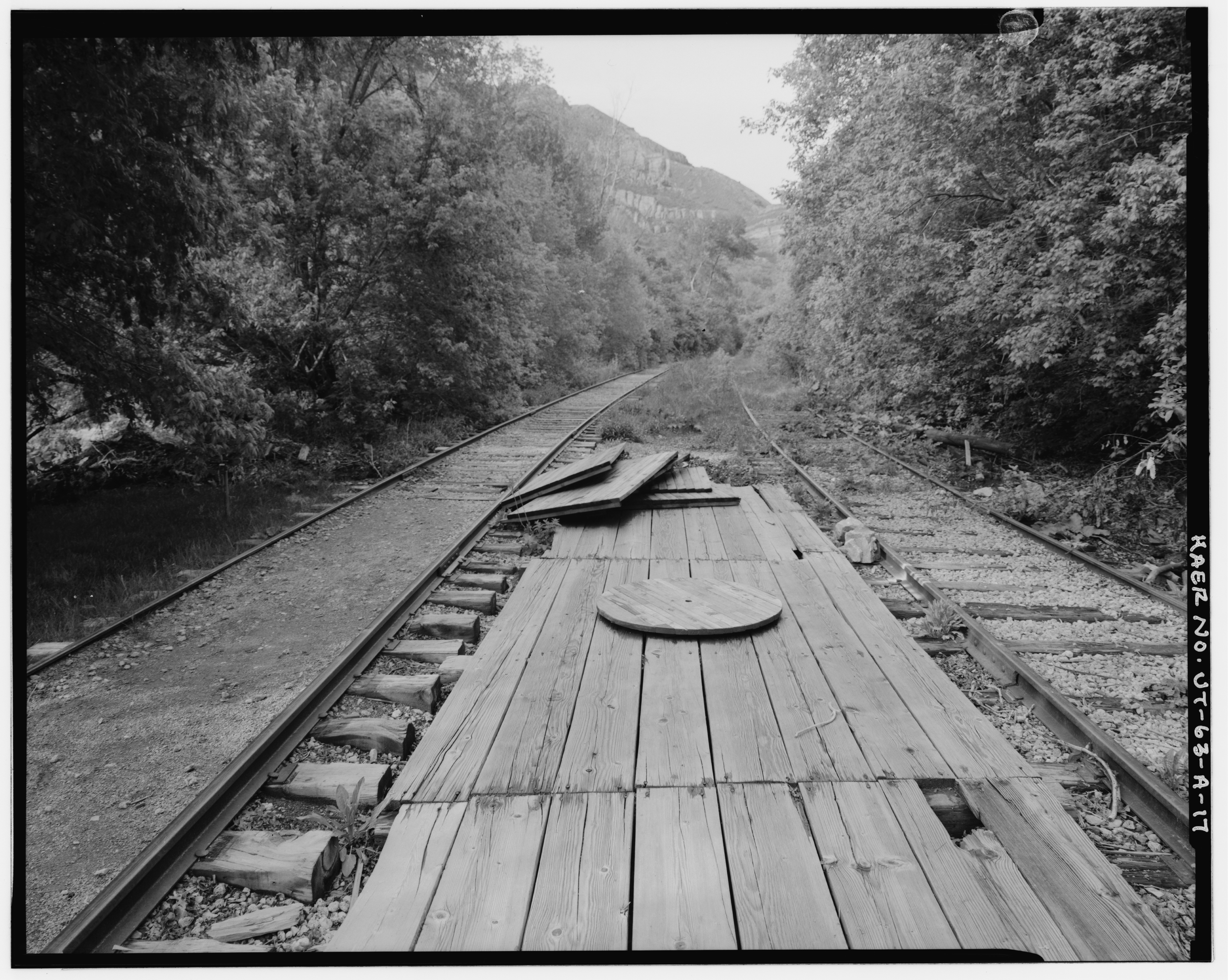
Bridal Veil Falls station in 1968, prior to reopening of the railroad.

== Preservation history ==
A group of Utah-based railfans had acquired Weyerhauser Timber Company No. 110 in the late 1960s and began eyeing the soon to be dismantled Heber City branch as a potential location to restore the engine to operation (although No. 110 would be stored at Heber it wouldn't be restored to operation until it was sold to the Black Hills Central Railroad years later). The proposed construction of U.S. Route 189 through Provo Canyon would have removed the old railroad grade, and the rail enthusiasts, entrepreneurs and environmentalists saw a shared incentive to preserve the railroad line from Bridal Veil Falls to Heber City. In 1969 the newly formed Wasatch Railroad Museum approached Tooele City to acquire former Tooele Valley Railway No. 11, but were rebuffed by the city. With Tooele Valley No. 11 no longer available, the museum turned its attention to acquiring former Union Pacific Railroad No. 618 which was at the time on static display at the Utah State Fairgrounds.

The line was saved for tourist use and was reopened in 1970 when No. 618 and other equipment were brought up the line from Provo. On April 22, 1971, another train ran behind newly acquired Pacific Lumber 35 carrying Rayonier 110 and several boxcars from the connection with the Rio Grande up the canyon to Heber as a final run on the lower end of Provo Canyon. Public tourist train services began that year in July. The Provo Canyon branch between Provo and Bridal Veil Falls was later removed disconnecting the Heber Creeper from the national rail network. The segment between Bridal Veil and Vivian Park would later be removed moving the line's terminus to Vivian Park, with the Provo to Vivian Park segment being converted into a recreational trail.

One of the primary investors in the private heritage rail operation was Heber area businessman Lowell Ashton and the Ashton family. The railroad operated publicly with the brand "The Heber Creeper" through the 1970s into the 1980s, using various other business names throughout the years such as the Wasatch Mountain Railroad, Timpanogos Preservation Society, the Deer Creek Scenic Railroad and finally the New London Railroad and Village. 1990 brought financial and operational strain to the railroad, when a new local sales tax impacted the railroad's profitability. In the ensuing financial dispute the Utah Department of Transportation rejected an early state offer to the Ashtons for the state to buy the railroad line upon recognizing that the Ashtons had improperly documented the titles and ownership records of much of the locomotive and equipment used by the railroad. With increasing issues mounting, the last private "Heber Creeper" train ran October 27, 1990 and the line went into bankruptcy.

Citizens in the Heber area successfully petitioned the State of Utah to help save the railroad, leading to creation of the Heber Valley Historic Railroad Authority. The Utah State Legislature voted to fund the purchase and reopening of the railroad line in 1992, selling off excess assets from the New London Railroad and Village operation to fund the rehabilitation of the railroad. Operations resumed in July 1992, while remaining unused equipment was sold to the Nevada State Railroad Museum (with pieces being moved to Boulder City into 1993). The first train on the reopened line ran in May 1993, while No. 618 was re-tubed and steam service returned in 1995. New shop facilities and a station were built with the rail line to the former Heber Creeper shops and station (a few blocks away) removed, while the railroad purchased Great Western Railway of Colorado No. 75 along with its associated "movie train" collection. Since this time the railroad has seen considerable growth. The railroad operates as a non-profit 501(c)(3) organization.

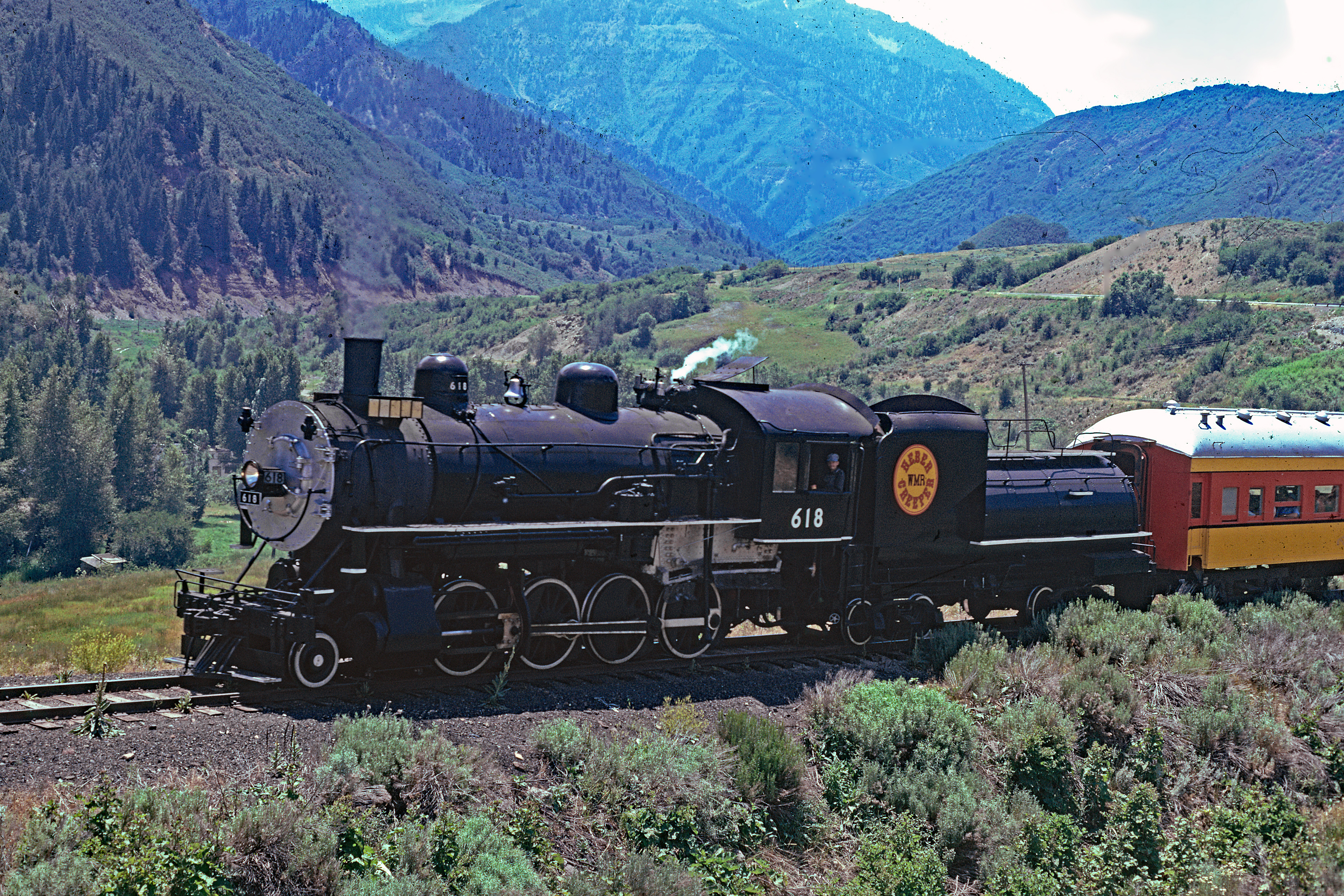
UP 618 in service in the 1970s, lettered for the Wasatch Mountain Railroad (WMR)

During the 2002 Winter Olympics the railroad was part of the Olympic Steam Team, carrying spectators to the Soldier Hollow Olympic venue. The railroad's No. 618 and 75 steam-engines, were joined by the Nevada Northern Railway Museum's No. 93 steam-engine, in pulling eight-car trains full of passengers, to the Soldier Hollow depot where they disembarked and continued to the venue entrance on a horse-drawn sleigh. The day prior to the Opening Ceremony of the games, all three locomotives were combined into one triple-headed train, and used to transport the Olympic flame from Soldier Hollow to Heber City as part of the torch relay. The railroad would acquire Columbia Steel No. 300 from the Geneva Recreation Assoction in 2003 to bring to Heber as a potential restoration candidate, but plans to restore the engine were dropped upon full inspection of the engine and shortly afterwards the departure of then Chief Mechanical Officer John Rimmasch from the railroad. In 2010, UP No. 618 would be taken out of service at the end of its federal boiler ticket, bringing a temporary end to steam services on the line. The railroad would be featured in a 2012 music video by The Piano Guys for their song Code Name Vivaldi, and the group would return to perform at the railroad in a benefit concert later the same year. In 2013 a former railroad inspector would publicly accuse the railroad of firing him as a whistleblower regarding what he claimed were poor maintenance conditions; which the railroad denied referencing their Federal Railroad Administration safety records. By 2015 the railroad had assessed a need for over $2 Million in track repairs and safety updates to improve the railroad's condition.

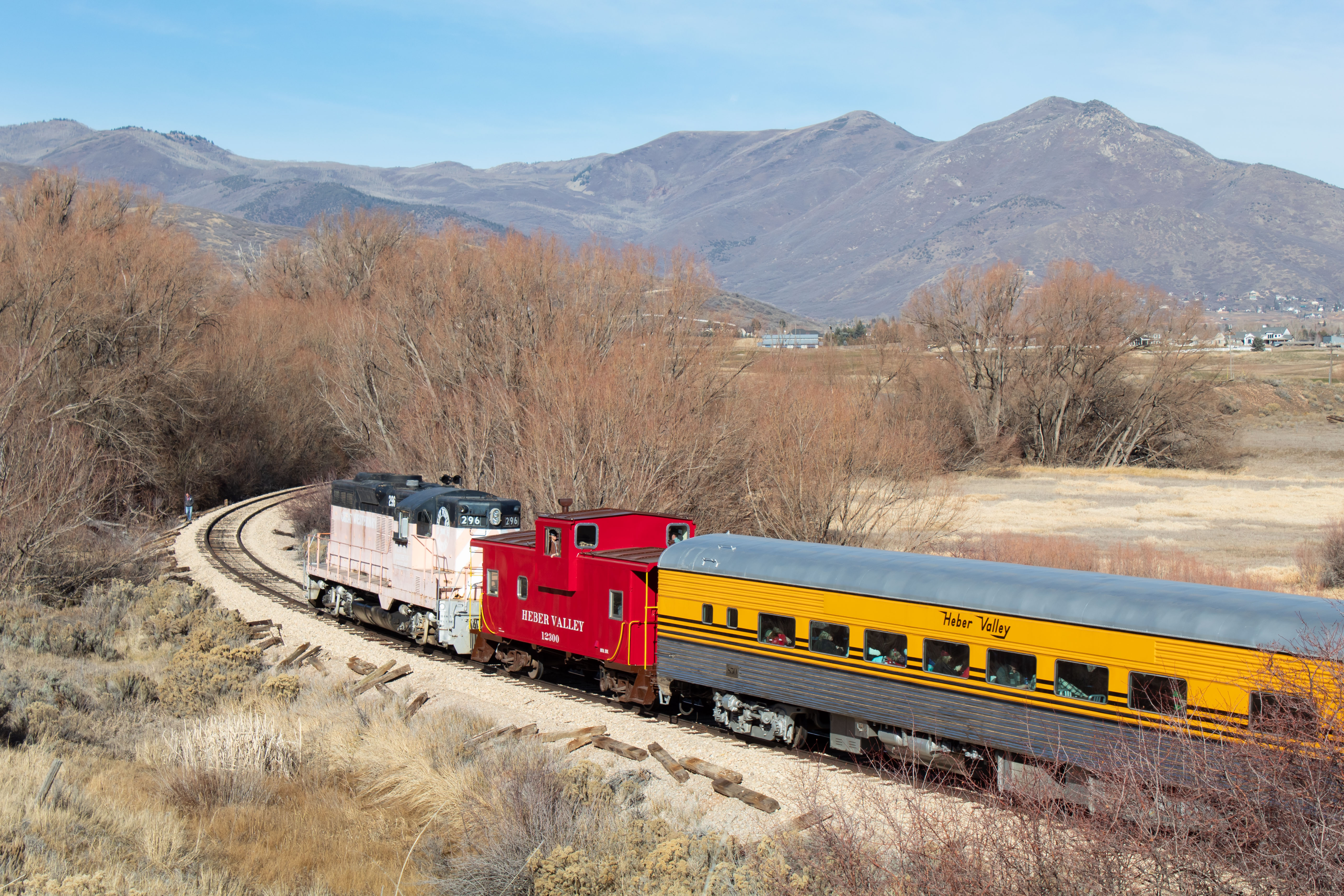
Heber Valley Railroad "North Pole Express" approaching Soldier Hollow, 2021

In the late 2010s the railroad embarked on a fleet modernization program, purchasing EMD GP9 locomotives from the Pan Am Railways and the Boulder Railroad Historical Society in Colorado. The railroad would also purchase the collection of the National Railway Historical Society British Columbia chapter in 2019 adding a FP9 to the locomotive roster and a collection of passenger cars to the roster. During this time work on returning No. 618 has been ongoing, but the longer and heavier train lengths with the growth of the railroad has had the line considering how it can successfully return steam to service while also matching increased passenger demands on the railroad.

In 2019 the railroad acquired the original neon sign from the Salt Lake Rio Grande Depot, storing the sign inside the expanded coach sheds built at the railroad. The line was temporarily closed from Vivian Park to Decker Bay Siding starting in 2022 to accommodate expansion and rehabilitation projects along the Provo Canyon trail. In early 2024, train service resumed between Decker Bay Siding and Wallsburg Siding following track work. The railroad added a pair of former Rio Grande flangers to the roster for snow removal in 2024. The former Salt Lake Rio Grande Depot sign was restored and converted to LED lights through early 2025, and installed on the Heber Valley's locomotive shop in June.

== Operations ==
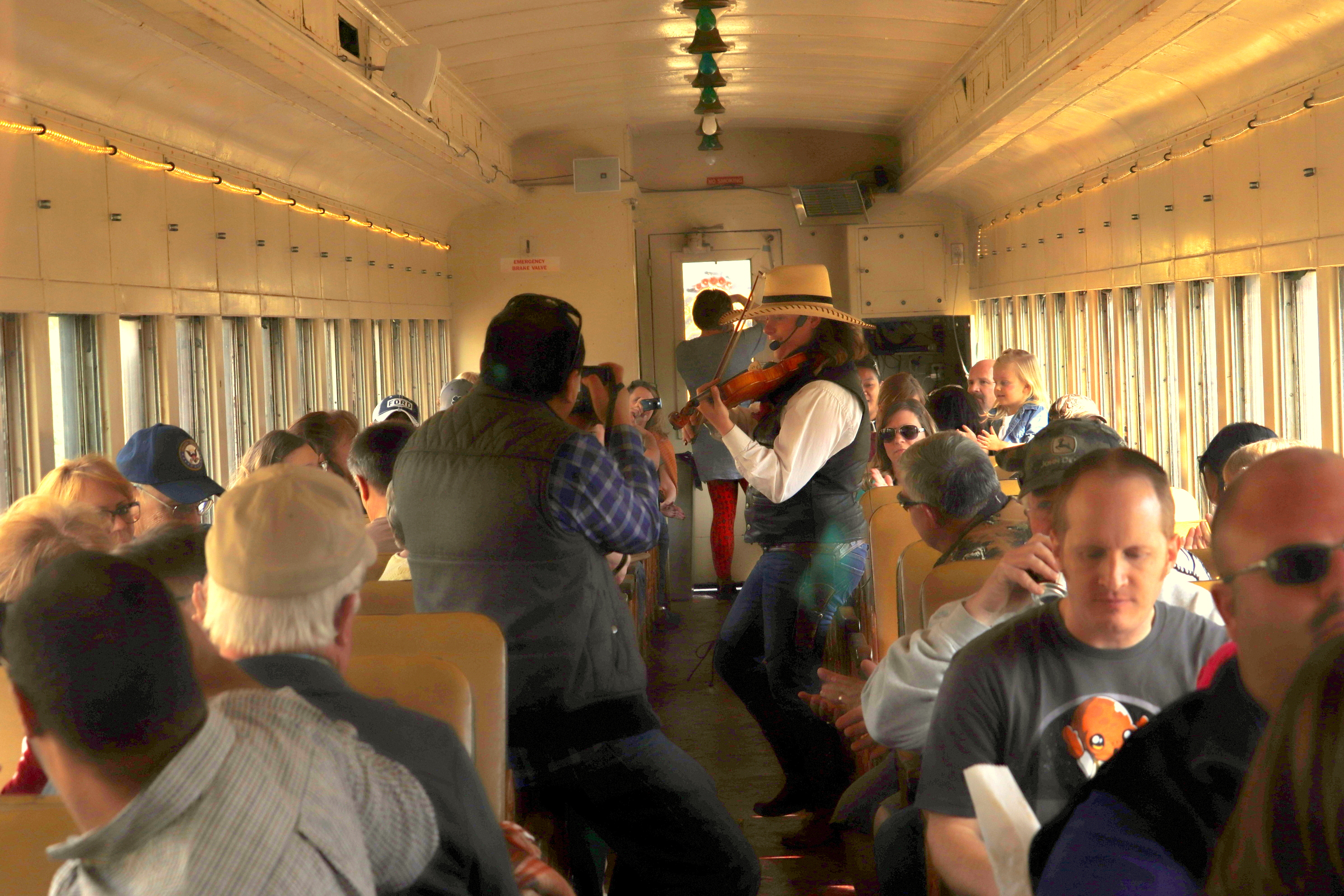
Live music performance on board the Heber Valley Railroad, 2017

The railroad's main depot is located in Heber City. Other passenger terminals are located at Soldier Hollow (near Midway, Utah) and Vivian Park. The railroad operates year-round and features evening and special event train rides. Among its named trains are the Provo Canyon Limited, a three-hour round trip excursion to Vivian Park and the shorter Deer Creek Express to Deer Creek Reservoir. The railroad can be seen from various points along U.S. Highway 189 between Heber City and Vivian Park and the whistle can be heard throughout the valley.

Locomotive No. 618 was used in the 2006 film, Outlaw Trail: The Treasure of Butch Cassidy. The locomotive soon turned 100 years old as of July 2007. From 2008 to 2010, No. 618 ran limited capacity and was then taken out of service for a 1,472-day inspection and major overhaul, as required to meet Federal Railroad Administration (FRA) safety standards in 2010. In October 2014, No. 618 was moved into the shops where restoration officially began. The non-profit railroad raised the $750,000 required for the project to give No. 618 another 30 years of service. Its restoration includes conversion from coal to oil burning. The railroad hopes to get it running sometime in the 2020s. As of May 2022, restoration work is still in progress. No. 75 has been out of service and undergoing restoration since 2003.

== Equipment ==
=== Locomotives ===
Locomotive details
Number	Image	Type	Wheel classification	Model	Built	Builder	Serial number	Status
618		Steam	2-8-0	C-2	1907	Baldwin Locomotive Works	31250	Restoration (FRA 1472)
75		Steam	2-8-0	10-34E	1907	Baldwin Locomotive Works	31778	Stored; Awaiting Restoration
300		Steam	0-6-0	6-36-D	1925	Baldwin Locomotive Works	58379	Display
5926		Diesel	B-B	GP9	1957	Electro-Motive Diesel	23224	Operational
5938		Diesel	B-B	GP9	1957	Electro-Motive Diesel	23236	Under Restoration
296		Diesel	B-B	GP9	1954	Electro-Motive Diesel	19893	Under Restoration
1011		Diesel	B-B	NW2	1940	Electro-Motive Diesel	1124	Stored; Awaiting Restoration
6300		Diesel	B-B	FP9ARM	1957	Electro-Motive Diesel	A1196	Operational

=== Former units ===
Locomotive details
Number	Image	Type	Wheel classification	Model	Built	Builder	Serial number	Owner	Status
110		Steam	2-6-6-2ST		1937	Baldwin Locomotive Works	62064	Black Hills Central Railroad	Operational
4		Steam	B-B-B	C70-3 Shay	1920	Lima Locomotive Works	3092	Sierra Nevada Logging Museum	Display
35		Steam	2-8-2	BLW 90 Ton	1923	Baldwin Locomotive Works	57538	Nevada State Railroad Museum Boulder City	Display
36		Steam	2-8-2		1925	American Locomotive Company	68278	Oregon Coast Scenic Railroad	Stored
100		Steam	2-8-2		1926	Baldwin Locomotive Works	59284	Virginia and Truckee Railroad	Under Restoration
1744		Steam	2-6-0	M-6	1901	Baldwin Locomotive Works	19671	Pacific Locomotive Association	Under Restoration
4028		Diesel	B-B	RS-4-TC-1	1954	Baldwin Locomotive Works (Baldwin Lima Hamilton)	61258	Placerville and Sacramento Valley Railroad	Operational
1813		Diesel	C-C	MRS-1	1952	Electro-Motive Diesel	15878	The Coffee Depot; Mt. Pleasant UT	Display
1218		Diesel	B-B	44-Ton switcher	1953	Davenport Locomotive Works	3366	Western Elite Landfill; Alamo, Nevada	Display
72		Diesel	B-B	GP9	1957	Electro-Motive Diesel	23239	470 Railroad Club (never delivered to Heber Valley)	Operational
1043		Diesel	B-B	NW2	7/1946	Electro-Motive Division	3429	Pacific States Cast Iron Pipe Co.	Scrapped by Heber Valley on August 2, 2024

== See also ==
- List of heritage railroads in the United States
