= Provo Canyon =

In Utah County and Wasatch County, Utah

Coordinates: 40°19′45″N 111°37′33″W

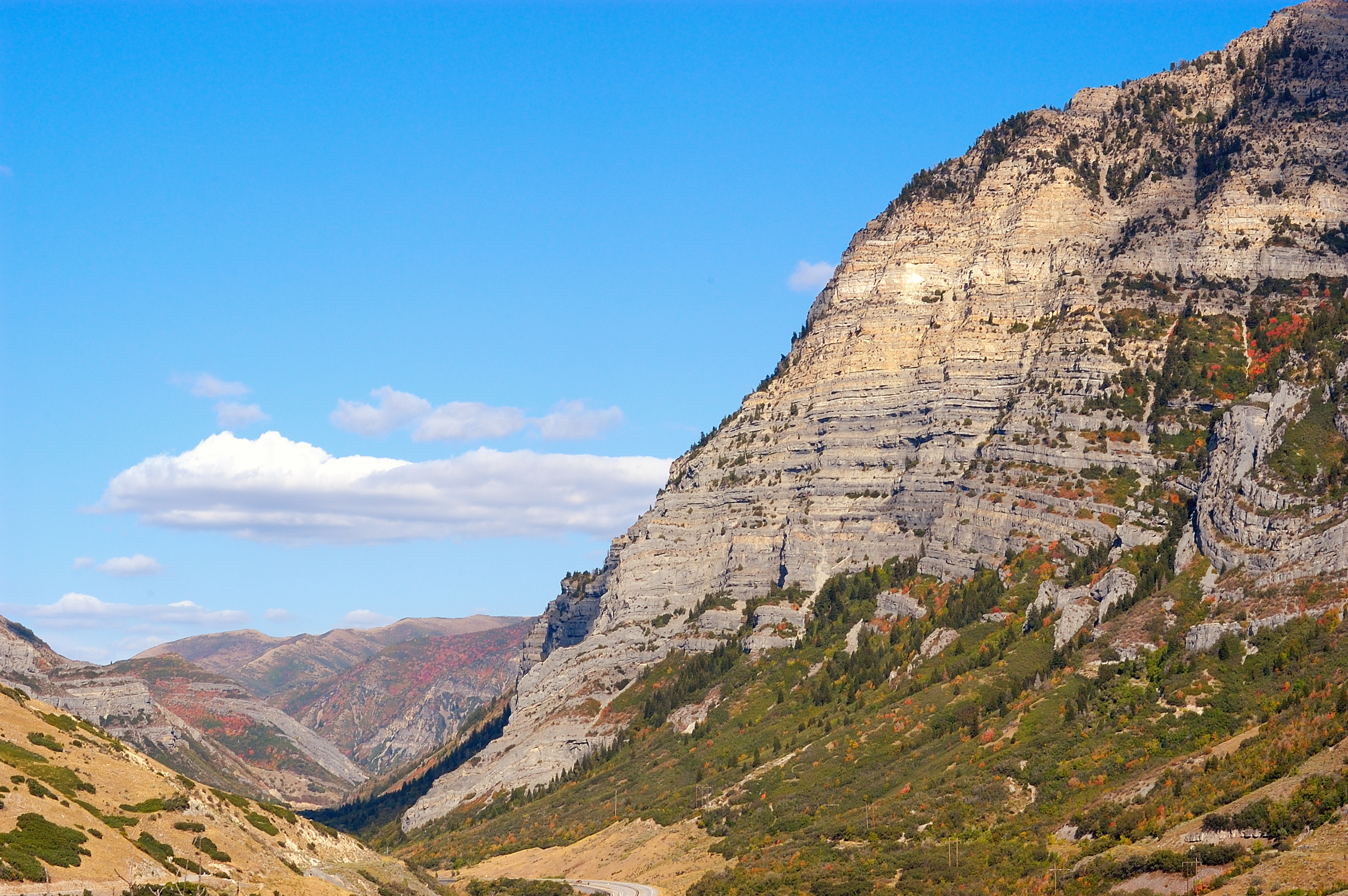
Provo Canyon from Utah County

Provo Canyon is located in unincorporated Utah County and Wasatch County, Utah. Provo Canyon runs between Mount Timpanogos on the north and Mount Cascade on the south. The canyon extends from Orem on the west end to Heber City on the east. Provo Canyon is situated to the east of Utah Valley and grants access to the valleys and Uinta Basin regions that lie beyond the Wasatch front.

Through forces of erosion, the Provo River has carved out the canyon over time. Attractions in Provo Canyon include Vivian Park, Sundance, and Bridal Veil Falls. The canyon is known for both its natural attractions and practical uses. Deer Creek Reservoir serves as water storage for Salt Lake and Utah Valleys. Provo Canyon has served as a route of transportation between the valleys to the east and west of the Wasatch mountain range. The Heber Valley Historic Railroad operates passenger trains through the canyon. U.S. route 189 connects Provo and Orem with Heber City to the east. In early settlement, this route facilitated the settlement of communities to the east of the Wasatch Mountains.

== History ==
=== Early Settlement (1849-1858) ===
Soon after permanently settling in the Salt Lake Valley, President Brigham Young of The Church of Jesus Christ of Latter-Day Saints began to send colonizing parties throughout the nearby regions. In 1849, Brigham Young sent a group of settlers to Utah Valley to colonize what is modern-day Provo, Utah. The group consisted of about 30 different families and 150 settlers in total. The land was attractive to these settlers for its abundance of fresh water. The Timpanogos Utes of the region were known as “fish-eaters” denoting a degree of abundance in that particular food source. Upon arrival, the party was immediately confronted by a Timpanogos Ute near the Provo River at the mouth of Provo Canyon. The Native American demanded that the settlers return to where they came from and warned them of conflict if they were to stay. The settlers quickly built fortifications and were soon able to obtain permission from the Timpanogos chief to remain in the valley.

The Timpanogos Utes resided in both Utah Valley and the Uinta Basin; therefore, Provo Canyon provided an essential connection so that these Native Americans could communicate and interact more effectively amongst themselves. The Mormon settlers saw the Provo Canyon as a feasible route for expansion into the valleys beyond the Wasatch Mountains. On January 19, 1855, The Provo Road company was established with the purpose of constructing a road that ran through Provo Canyon. By July 1858 the road reached Kamas City, UT (then known as Kamas Prairie).

=== Civil Construction in Provo Canyon (1890-1941) ===
After the Utah Valley settlers claimed Provo Canyon by building a road through it, the canyon soon became home to residential communities and a string of public works projects.

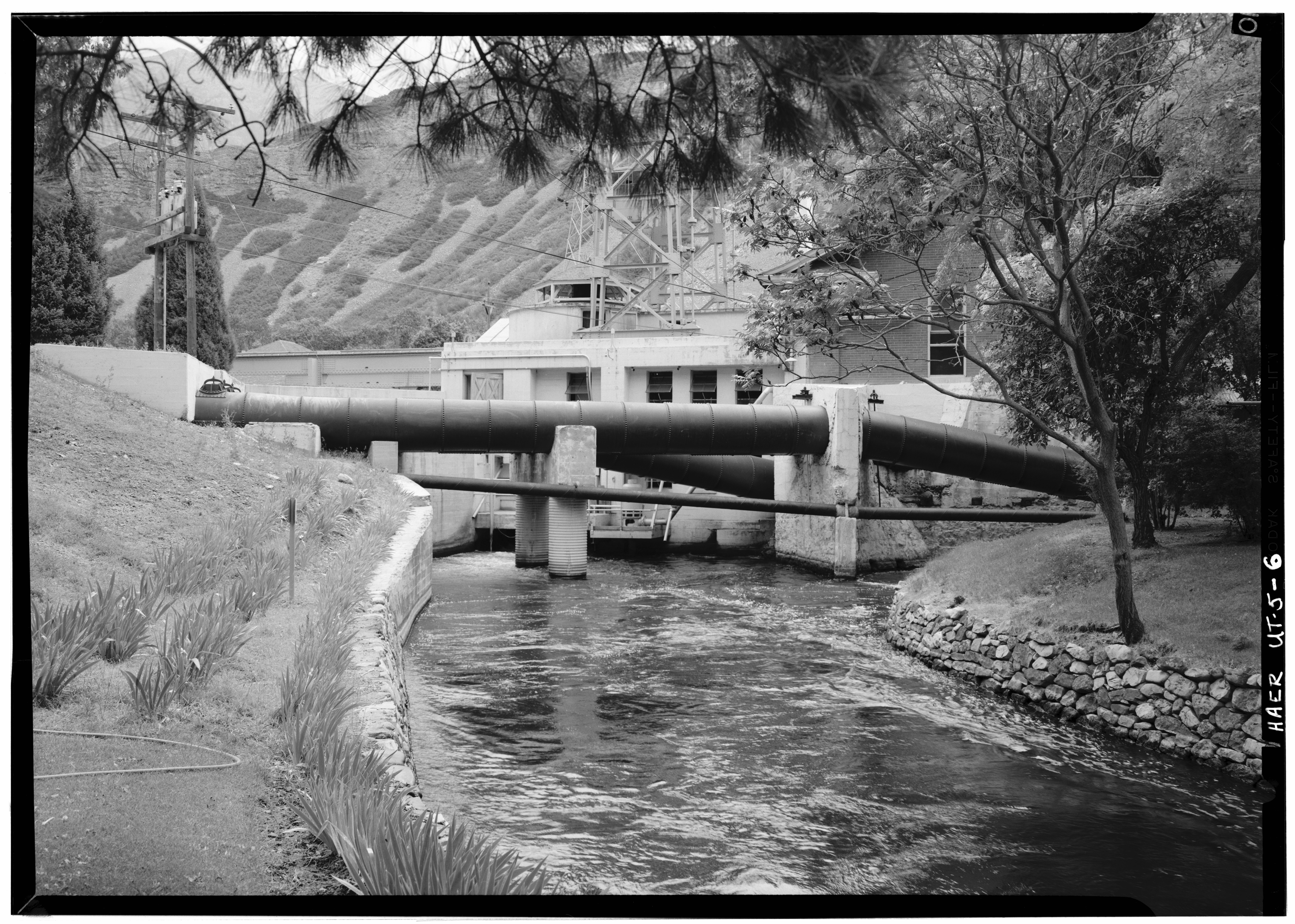
Telluride Power Plant

Throughout the latter years of the 19th century, many individuals attempted to harvest the Provo River's current into electricity. However, their results were inconsistent due to the river's instability. Successfully constructing a hydroelectric project requires a lot of careful speculation and preparation. In 1899 the Telluride Power Company constructed and successfully operated Nunn's Station. Nunn's Station was the first 40,000 Volt hydroelectric producer in the world, making long-distance high voltage transmission possible. The meticulous planning that went into the construction of Nunn's Station provided jobs and economic growth throughout the surrounding communities. The plant was quickly purchased from Telluride by the Utah Power and Light Company and the station remained in operation until 1940. The area that once was Nunn's Station is currently dedicated to a campground known as Nunn's Park. During the Great Depression, President Franklin D. Roosevelt's New Deal policies greatly impacted the inhabitants of Provo Canyon and Utah Valley. This "New Deal" consisted of a set of political-economic institutions that were established with the purpose of regulating the United States economy during the Great Depression. Public construction throughout the nation had mostly disappeared due to the poor economic climate. The Public Works Administration was a New Deal institution that was created to combat the lack of civil construction in the Great Depression economy. After the Public Works Administration was established in June 1933, residents in the Utah Valley region began to request that a dam and reservoir be constructed on the Provo River in order to create jobs and facilitate agriculture.

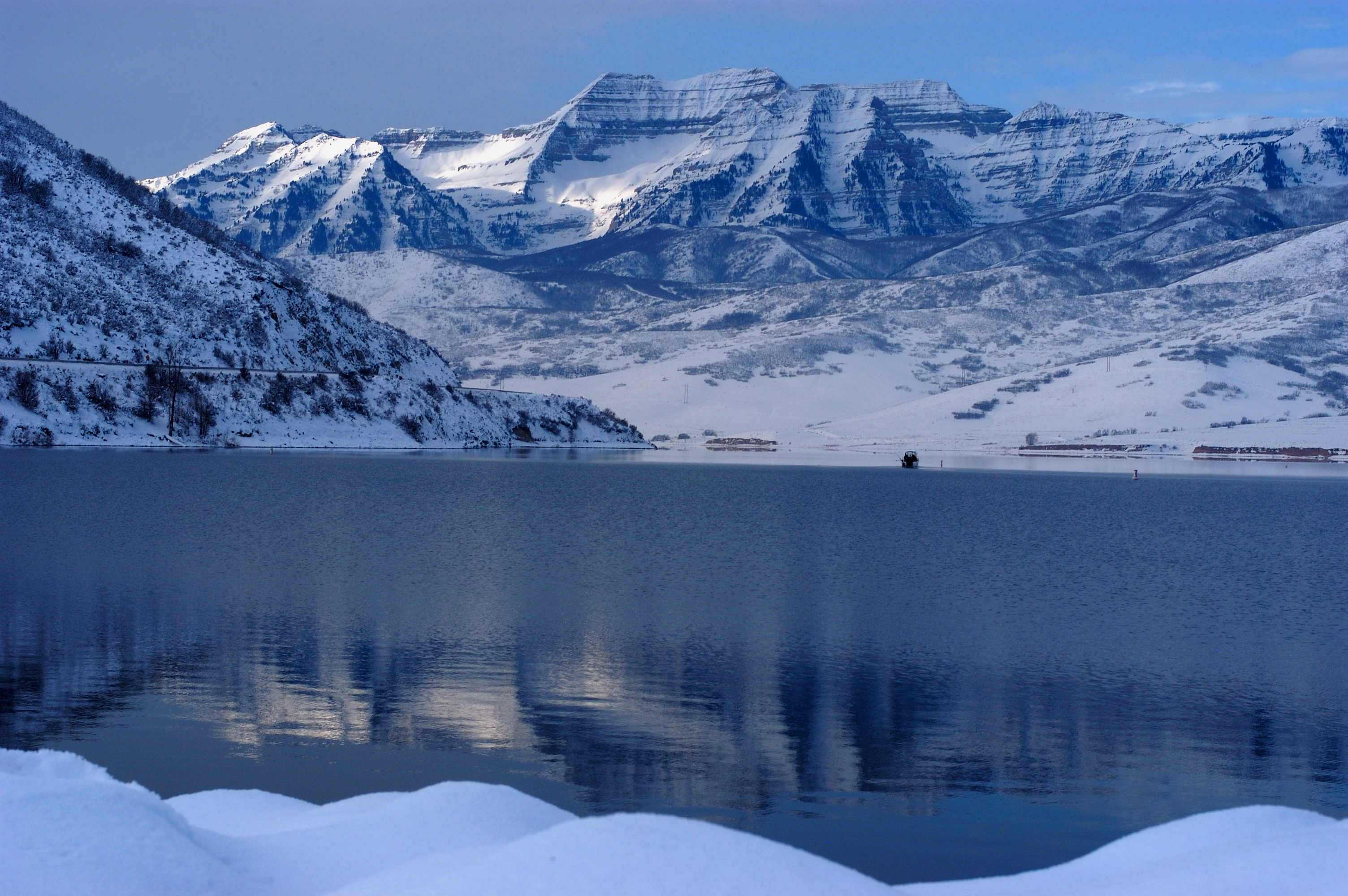
Deer Creek Reservoir

Deer Creek Reservoir was constructed southwest of Heber City, Utah on the Wasatch side of Provo Canyon. When filled to capacity, the reservoir stretches seven miles long and three-quarters mile wide with an area of 150,000 acre feet and a maximum depth of 120 feet. The main water supply for Deer Creek Reservoir is the Provo River, whose headwaters lie in the Uinta Mountains. The water stored by the reservoir is used both domestically and for irrigation by both the Salt Lake and Utah Valleys. By its completion in 1941, Deer Creek Reservoir became the first large man-made reservoir in the state of Utah with a primary purpose of providing culinary water.

== Transportation ==
=== Provo Canyon Road ===
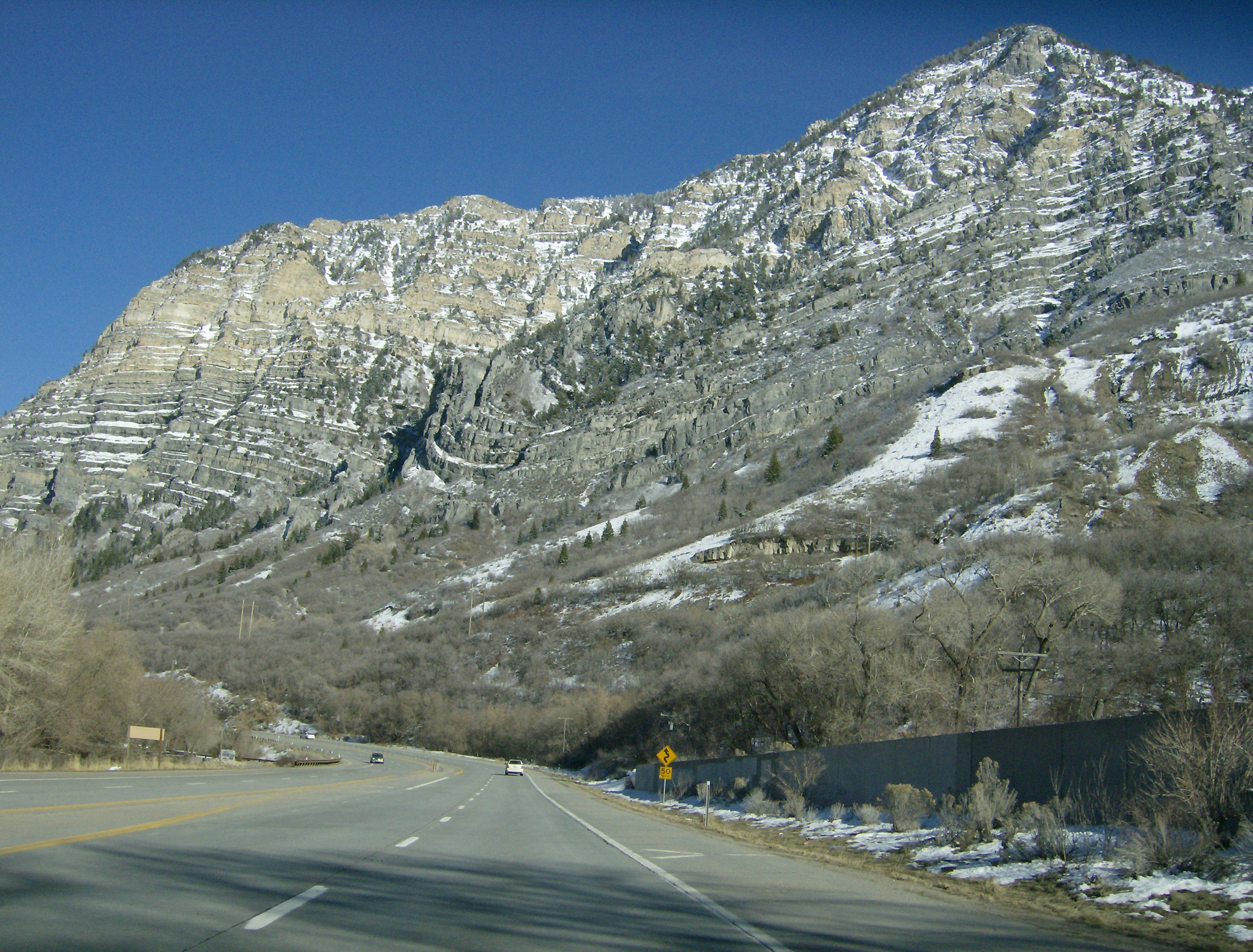
Highway 189 in Provo Canyon

Until Fall of 1858, the only established travel route through Provo Canyon was an old Indian trail on the north side of the canyon. In 1852, explorer William Gardner was the first person to propose that a road be built in Provo Canyon. Nothing came of this proposal until 1855 when the Utah Legislature granted William Wall, Evan M. Green, Thomas S. Williams, and Aaron Johnson the right to, “...build a toll road from the mouth of Provo Canyon through the canyon, [and] through Kamas Prairie.” Construction on the road began, and significant progress was made, but work on the road stopped in 1857 due to the ongoing Utah War. A year later, residents in nearby Provo were eager to see the road completed, so they met with Bringem Young on June 6, 1858 and formed the Provo Canyon Road Company. With this newfound drive to complete the road, it was finished in the Fall of 1858. Since its construction in 1858, US-189 (Provo Canyon Road) has seen improvements in quality and size. The road was first paved in the early 1930s, and In 1992, the expansion of US-189 from two lanes to four lanes was completed.

=== Heber Valley Railroad ===
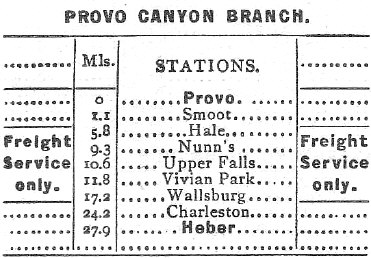
Stations along the Heber Valley Railroad

The first attempt to build a railroad through Provo Canyon came when the United States government sent a surveying team out to Provo Canyon to determine the feasibility of it being part of the route for the Transcontinental Railroad. However, the Transcontinental Railroad ended up passing through Ogden, Utah, and not Provo Canyon. Around thirty years later in 1896, The Denver and Rio Grande Western Railroad company began surveying Provo Canyon to see where they could begin to construct a railroad. After a years long battle with Lucien L. Nunn over right-of-way issues in the canyon, construction of the railroad was completed in 1899.

The Heber Valley Railroad, nicknamed the "Heber Creeper" for its slow speed, ran twice daily from 1899 to 1930 and transported both cargo and passengers. When US-189 was paved in the early 1930s, passenger and cargo traffic on the Heber Creeper significantly decreased because people and goods started using automobiles rather than railroads. As a result, the Heber Creeper started to run more and more infrequently until 1968, when the Heber Creeper stopped running altogether. The railroad sat dormant until 1992, when the Heber Valley Historic Railroad Authority (a state agency) was created to take charge of the railroad. The Railroad now runs a short scenec route Heber to Vivian Park several times per week.

== Communities ==
=== Sundance ===
Sundance Mountain Resort is a ski resort located up Provo Canyon and is accessed by US-189 and SR-92. Sundance ski resort was originally named Timp Haven, but the name was changed to Sundance when Robert Redford bought Timp Haven Ski Resort in 1969 Redford revamped the resort into a Mecca for film producers through his institution of the Sundance Film Festival. Sundance is widely known for its skiing, but the resort also offers activities during the summer, including mountain biking, hiking, and scenic lift rides.

=== Vivian Park ===
Vivian Park is located five miles from the mouth of Provo Canyon and was originally run as a resort. Many of the homes in Vivian Park were weekend getaways for residents living in nearby Provo and Orem, and the land directly south of the Provo River was occupied by a restaurant, store, and post office. Vivian Park was named after Vivian McBride, a young girl whose parents owned and operated the store and post office. In 1974, Vivian Park became a Utah County Public Park, and today it serves as a recreation area with pavilions, a fishing pond, volleyball, and access to the Provo River Parkway trail.

=== Canyon Glen Park ===
Canyon Glen Park is a hidden gem for families and small get-togethers. Being located only two and a half miles from the mouth of Provo Canyon allows visitors quick access to the cities of Provo and Orem. It features two pavilions, an amphitheater, volleyball courts, and five open fire pits. Bathrooms and a drinking fountain are available at all times. The park gives direct access to the Provo River Parkway Trail and has over 100 off-street parking spaces. The park has a unique boulder playground and a large field making it great for people of all ages.

=== Nunns Park ===
Nunns Park is a camping spot a little over three miles up Provo Canyon. Named after L.L. Nunn a pioneer of hydroelectric power, he used the flows of the Provo River to create the first 44,000-volt hydropower powerplant in America. The plant provided power for mining operations in the canyon, but the grounds would eventually be sold to Utah County as a park site. Offering two pavilions, picnic tables with BBQ grills, eight fire pits, restrooms, and drinking water. Direct access to the Equestrian Trailhead as well as the Provo River Parkway Trail. The park works on a first-come, first-served basis, however, you may reserve a pavilion for group use.

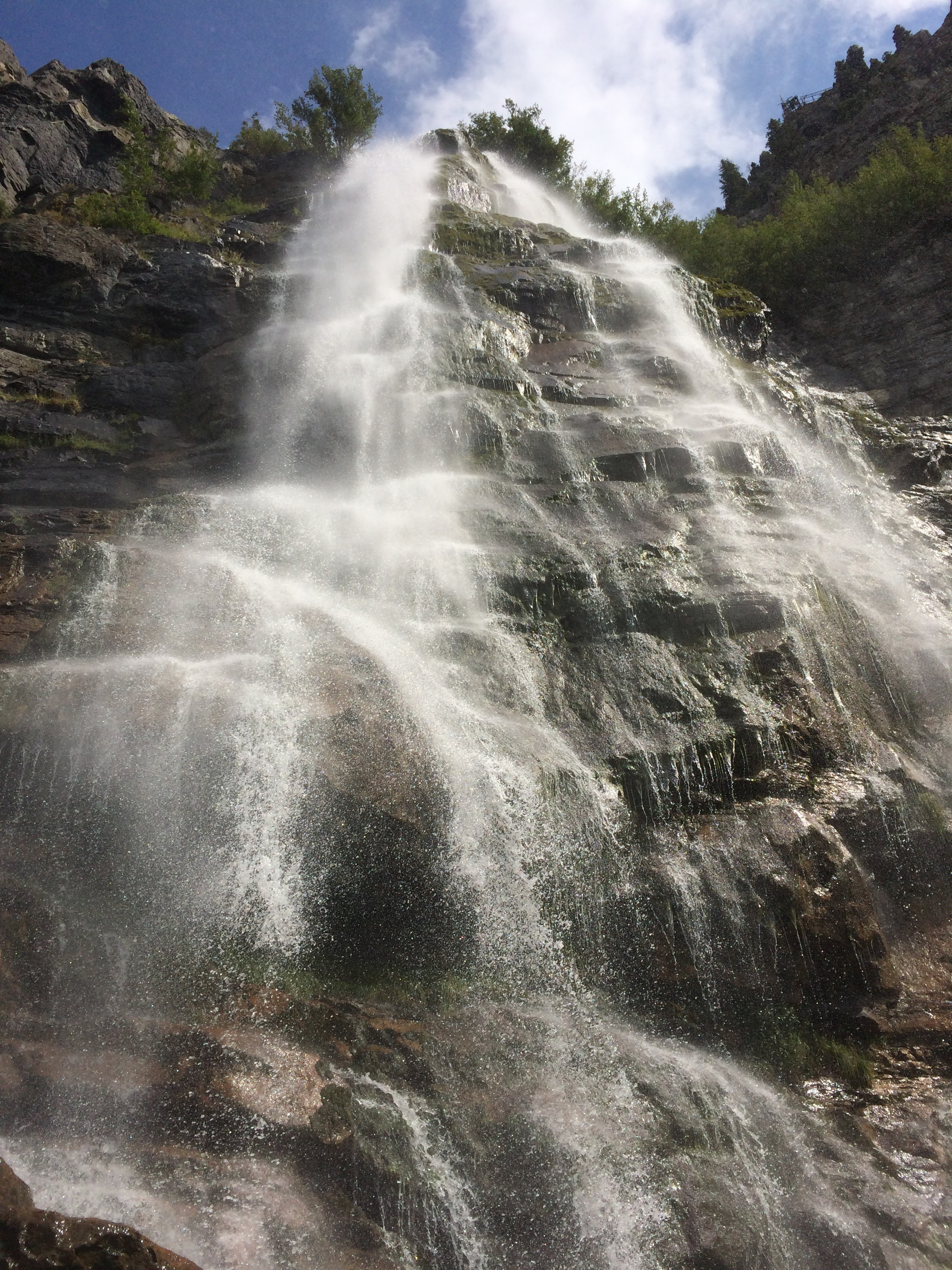
Bridal Veil Falls

=== Bridal Veil Falls ===
The beautiful Bridal Veil Falls are located a little over three and a half miles from the mouth of Provo Canyon. Multiple parking lots are available, and a short walk is all it takes to reach the base. Packed with picnic tables and barbeque grill pits make it perfect for nice picnics. Large fish used to swim around the water pools at the bottom of the falls. The city provided a quarter-operated machine for fish food to feed them. The fish were removed in 2019. In previous years visitors would take the Bridal Veil Falls to a restaurant on the mountain, however, due to avalanche damage the tram was closed in 1996. Standing at 617 feet the gorgeous falls are a must-see for visitors of the Provo area. The sleeper hit family film "Savanah Smiles" featured the falls along with the old tram in its climax.

== Avalanches ==
Provo Canyon has a long history of avalanches that have blocked travel, caused hundreds of thousands of dollars in damage, and killed both residents and workers. One of the earliest avalanches in the canyon on record occurred on February 18, 1897 and killed William (Bill) Ferguson, founder of Vivian Park, in his home in South Fork. One of the main slide paths in Provo Canyon is located directly above the famous Bridal Veil Falls, and numerous avalanches over the years have caused dramatic damage to the area. In March 1924, a slew of avalanches killed two workers who were working to clear railroad tracks of previous avalanche debris. Seventy-two years later, another avalanche came down the same Bridal Veil Falls slide path and destroyed both the Bridal Veil store and tram house.

During the winter, US-189 is closed periodically by the Utah Highway Patrol to allow for avalanche mitigation work to be done. These controlled bombings are done to minimize the amount of natural slides that come down and could potentially bury cars on US-189. Cleanup of these avalanches generally keeps the canyon closed for a few hours at a time, but cleanup has not always been that quick. Avalanches in the early and mid 1900s blocked travel and would close Provo Canyon for days, and sometimes weeks, on end. In February 1936, avalanches closed the road for 10 days, and 4 years earlier in 1932, a group of avalanches kept the road closed for over a month. Due to the magnitude of one of the avalanches, a makeshift wooden road was built over the top of it, rather than clearing its debris from off of the road.

== See also ==
- Provo Canyon School
