= Union Pacific 618 =

Preserved American 2-8-0 locomotive

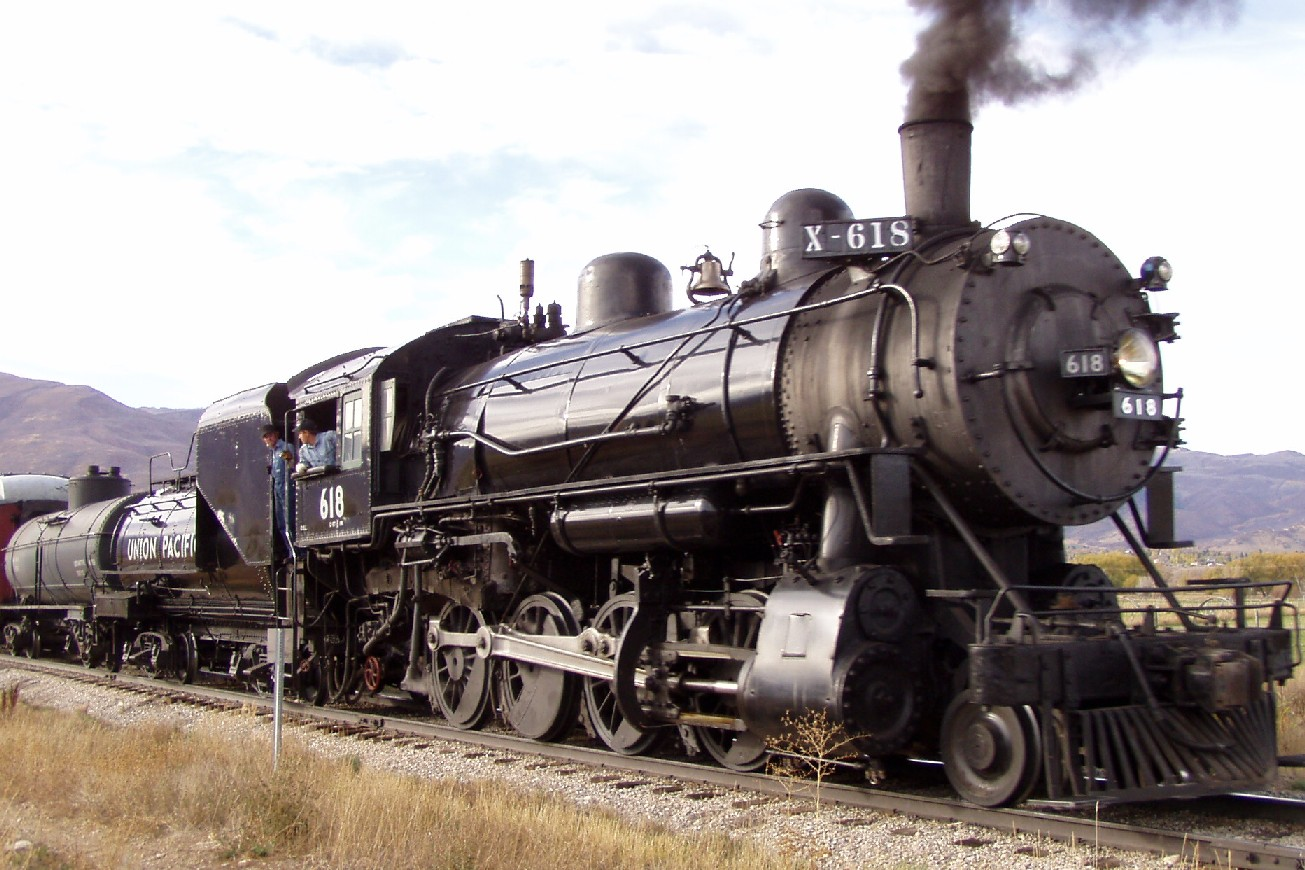
- No. 618 running on the Heber Valley Railroad in October 2004
Type and origin
- Power type: Steam
- Builder: Baldwin Locomotive Works
- Serial number: 31250
- Build date: July 1907
- Rebuild date: 1941; 1957
Specifications
- Configuration
  - Whyte: 2-8-0
- Gauge: 4 ft 8 1/2 in (1,435 mm) standard gauge
- Fuel type: New: Coal; Now: Oil (Post-current overhaul)
- Fuel capacity: 16,000 lb (7,300 kg)
- Water cap.: 9,000 US gal (34,000 L; 7,500 imp gal)
- Boiler pressure: 200 lbf/in^{2} (1.38 MPa)
- Cylinders: Two, outside
- Valve gear: Stephenson
- Valve type: Piston valves
- Loco brake: Air
- Train brakes: Air
- Couplers: Knuckle
Performance figures
- Maximum speed: 60 mph (97 km/h)
Career
- Operators: Oregon Short Line Railroad; Union Pacific Railroad; Wasatch Mountain Railway (leased); Heber Valley Railroad
- Class: C-2
- Numbers: OSL 1068; UP 618
- Retired: May 1958 (revenue service); 1976 (1st excursion service); October 1990 (2nd excursion service)
- Preserved: June 1958
- Restored: December 5, 1970 (1st excursion service); 1986 (2nd excursion service); May 13, 1995 (3rd excursion service)
- Current owner: Heber Valley Railroad
- Disposition: Undergoing 1,472-day inspection and overhaul

Union Pacific 618 is a C-2 class 2-8-0 "Consolidation" type steam locomotive. It was built in July 1907 by the Baldwin Locomotive Works (BLW) of Eddystone, Pennsylvania, for the Union Pacific Railroad (UP). The engine is now located in Heber City, Utah and owned by the Heber Valley Railroad (HVRX).

No. 618 is one of two surviving Oregon Short Line C-2 locomotives. The locomotive operated in revenue service until 1958. It was then donated to the State of Utah, where it sat on display for many years. In the mid 1960s, a full restoration effort began on the locomotive with the promise of heading up Utah's first tourist railroad in Heber City after the state donated the engine to the National Railway Historical Society (NRHS).

Today, it is one of UP's oldest locomotives and the first steam locomotive to be removed from a Public Park, and put back into operational condition in excursion service. The engine currently is out of service in Heber City, Utah undergoing its FRA inspection and some major restoration work to return it to operating condition.

== History ==
=== Revenue service ===
In July 1907, the Oregon Short Line Railroad (OSL) received No. 1068. The 2-8-0 locomotive was part of the C-2 Class of locomotives for the OSL, which was a subsidiary of the Union Pacific (UP). The 2-8-0 was part of a three locomotive order from the Oregon Short Line Railroad built that month by Baldwin and numbered 1066-1068. By 1915, No. 1068 would be renumbered to No. 618.

During World War II, the locomotive pulled trains from the Ogden Yards to the Ogden Army Defense Base. This lasted from 1941-1945 when the Japanese surrendered. Afterward, the engine continued to handle freight in Utah and Idaho. Around 1949-1951, the standard square coal tender was replaced with a Vanderbilt styled tender. The reason why is still unknown. Through the 1950s, the locomotive continued to operate on freight duties until the engine was replaced by diesel locomotives on the Union Pacific. The locomotive's last assignment was to act as a snowplow near the Geneva Steel Mill. The Union Pacific had decided to donate 618 to the State of Utah with the agreement that the locomotive could not be sold, scrapped, or given to an out of state railroad. In late May of 1958, the locomotive was fired up what some thought was the very last time. It pulled into the Diesel Complex in Salt Lake City. It was then pushed across North Temple Street to the County Fairgrounds and placed on display.

Initially, the locomotive was fairly well received by the public. However, after a while, the locomotive had started to become an eyesore. Many people wanted to get rid of No. 618, but the stipulations of the Union Pacific giving No. 618 to the state was that it couldn't be scrapped, sold, or given out of state. This prompted many to speculate what else to do with the locomotive. In the mid 1960s, there was a thought of just burying the engine. According to Stephen Carr, a historian at the Heber Valley Railroad, he stated that, "There was a thought of digging a big hole right next, next to it and tumbling it into the hole. Because nobody knew what else to do with it and nobody was interested in it." In addition, the fairgrounds also were going to be expanded, and the locomotive needed to be moved to allow it. However, members of the National Railway Historical Society (NRHS) decided to step in and in 1969, they convinced the state to donate the engine to the Promontory Chapter of the National Railway Historical Society. After the donation, the group started conversations with the state to use the locomotive in a brand new tourist railroad based out of Heber City, Utah on the Wasatch Railway Museum.

On September 26, 1970, No. 618 was removed from its display spot at the Utah State Fairgrounds. A month later on October 12, 1970, it was relocated to the abandoned Provo Canyon Branch. Two years earlier in 1967, the D&RGW had abandoned the Provo Branch Line that linked Provo to Heber City. The tracks were planned to be ripped up and be turned over as an extension of U.S Route 189. Several locals and businessmen fought to keep the tracks in order to start a potential tourist operation. When the Wasatch Mountain Railway moved their equipment onto the branch, Utah told them to leave. UDOT gave the historical group until April 1, 1972 to move its equipment.

=== Excursion service ===
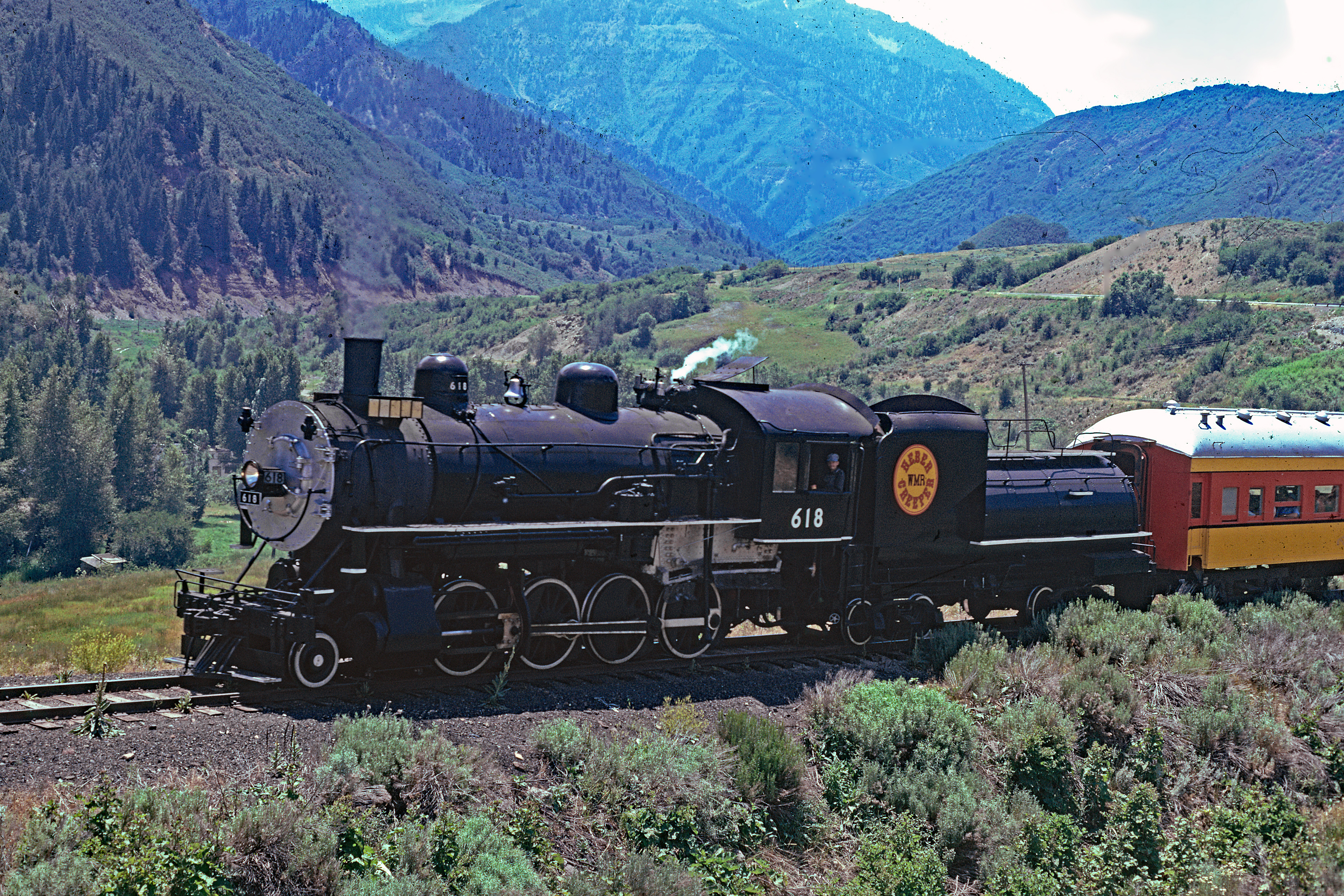
No. 618 running on the original Heber Creeper

On December 5, 1970, No. 618 was fired up and moved under its own power again for the first time in twelve years. The railroad more or less balked at the order and operated the No. 618 to its new home in Heber City from Provo on December 7, 1970, with four U.S. Army hospital cars and a diver caboose. The engine would eventually arrive in Heber City Utah later that night.

By 1971, the railroad added to their fleet with Pacific Lumber Co. No. 35 and a 3-Truck Shay No. 4 from the Yosemite Lumber Company. On January 3, 1971, No. 618 was fired up and ran the first excursion on the Heber Creeper. In November, the state decided to rescind their eviction and granted the Wasatch Railway Museum a 25 year lease on the former branch. It ran excursion trains from 1970 until 1976 when it was taken out of service for repairs. After sitting for ten years, the railroad moved the engine in the shops were they began rebuilding the engine.

In 1986, No. 618 was rebuilt and returned to service, it would continue to haul excursions trains for the Heber Creeper for four years until October 1990 when the Heber Creeper went out of business, its fired was dropped for the last and was once again retired from service and put into storage. In 1992, the State of Utah moved all of its railroad equipment for use by the Heber Valley Railroad (HVRX). For two years, the engine sat on display until 1993 when the railroad moved it into the shops to return it back to operating condition. No. 618's restoration was completed on May 13, 1995 and pulled its first excursion train of the 1995 season to Deer Creek Dam and return.

In 2007, the locomotive celebrated its 100th birthday and was relettered and renumbered as Oregon Short Line No. 1068.

In 2010, No. 618 hauled its last trains during Memorial Day weekends for photo charters before its boiler ticket expired. After the event, it was indefinitely taken out of service in June 2010 and put on static display in front of the railroad depot where it was previously awaiting its Federal Railroad Administration (FRA) 1,472-day inspection.

In October 2014, No. 618 was removed from its display track and moved into the shops to officially undergo its FRA inspection and some major restoration work to return it to operating condition again. Additional work to No. 618 includes rebuilding the cab and running gear, and a conversion from coal firing to oil firing. As of May 2026, work is still in progress.

== See also ==
- Union Pacific 4466
- Union Pacific 1243
- Oregon Railroad and Navigation 197
- Southern Pacific 1744
- Great Western 60
