= Kurt Mortensen =

American author, consultant, and speaker (born 1967)

Kurt W. Mortensen is an American author, business consultant, and motivational speaker known for his book Maximum Influence. The book was named one of the Library Journal's Best Business Books for 2004.

Mortensen was born in 1967 in southern California and currently lives with his family in Provo, Utah. He attended college at Brigham Young University where Mortensen received a bachelor's degree in Communications/Advertising in 1992.

== Career ==
=== Books ===
Mortensen's works focus on the topics of persuasion, negotiation, and influence, with an emphasis on how this can be applied to business and sales. He published his first book, Maximum Influence, in 2004. Upon its release the book received praise from The Roanoke Times and The Miami Herald, the reviewer for the latter of which highlighted the book's clarity and ability to be used in real-world situations.

His second book, Persuasion IQ, was published in 2008 and a fourth, The Laws of Charisma, was released in 2010.

=== Other work ===
Aside from writing, Mortensen also works as a business consultant and a motivational speaker.

== Bibliography ==
- Maximum Influence, published in 2004 (ISBN 978-0-8144-7258-3).
- Persuasion IQ, published in 2008 (ISBN 978-0-8144-0993-0).
- The Laws of Charisma, published in 2010
