= Clyde Bawden =

- Born: Provo, Utah, U.S.
- Genres: Contemporary Christian music; Christmas
- Occupations: Composer; arranger; performer
- Instruments: Piano

Clyde Bawden is an American composer of contemporary Christian music.

== Early life ==
Clyde Bawden was born and raised in Provo, Utah, where he worked in real estate, education, and performed missionary work. He moved his family to Mesa, Arizona, where he began writing piano compositions and performing them for schools.

== Career ==
In 1999, Bawden released his debut album Pure Inspiration. In her review of the album, AllMusic's Dacia A. Blodgett-Williams praised it as "an excellent collection of inspirational melodies" and described Bawden as "an artist to watch in the upcoming years."

Bawden arranged and performed the song "I Need Thee Every Hour" for the soundtrack to the 2011 film Higher Ground, Vera Farmiga's directorial debut.

In 2012, Clyde Bawden teamed up with fellow composer Jason Barney to write and produce the Christmas album Brighter Days Ahead with Clyde Bawden, which entered the Billboard 200 chart at number 179.

The following year, the pair worked together to create another Christmas album: Glenn Beck Presents: Believe Again, which featured artists like David Osmond. In December 2013, the album reached #63 on the Billboard 200 chart.

Bawden began his career as a solo artist, but In 2007 he worked with photographer Mark Mabry to write the original score to Reflections of Christ and again in 2009 followed up with an original composition for Another Testament of Christ. Starting at number 6 on Billboard's Regional Heatseeker #1s Mountain chart in November 2008, "Reflections of Christ" had climbed to #1 by January of the following year.

For several years, Clyde toured with the Reflections of Christ exhibit while composing the score for the movie Restoring Love, starring Glenn Beck.
