= Bridal Veil Falls (Utah) =

Waterfall in Provo, Utah

Coordinates: 40°20′20″N 111°36′05″W

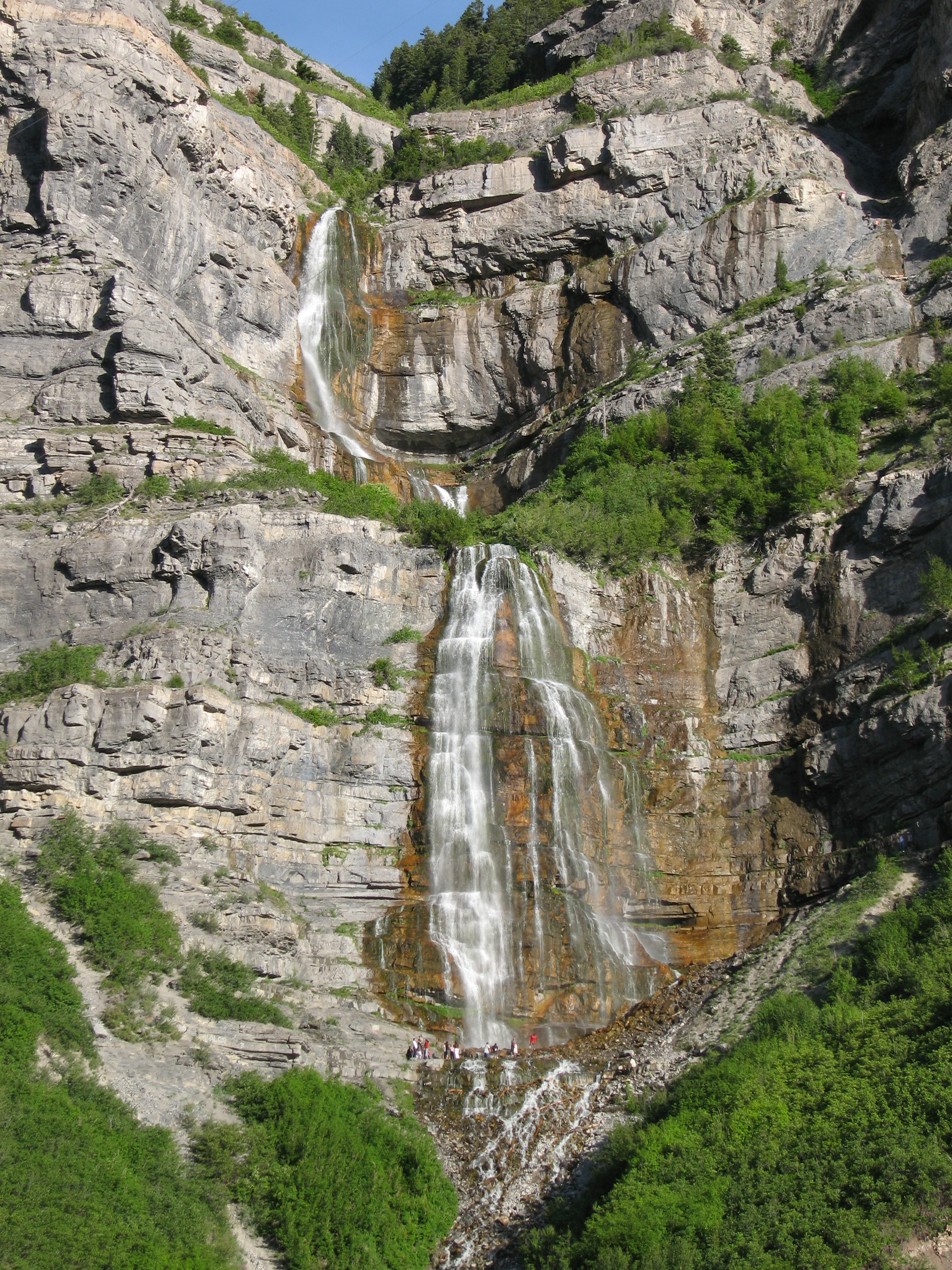
Hikers (base of lower falls) visit Bridal Veil Falls.

Bridal Veil Falls is a 607-foot-tall (185 m) double cataract waterfall in the south end of Provo Canyon, close to US189 in Utah, United States. Battle Creek Falls is on a nearby mountain side, approximately 10 miles north of Bridal Veil Falls.

== History ==
- An aerial tramway service to the top of the falls was built in 1961, and the small, six-passenger tramway functioned as a recreational attraction and as the only access to the mountaintop Eagle's Nest Lodge and restaurant, situated on a cliff at the top of the falls and built by Groneman Construction. When the tramway was in operation prior to the 1996 avalanche, it was heralded as the "world's steepest aerial tramway," although that claim is difficult to ascertain.
- The falls were a featured point along the route of the Heber Creeper tourist train until the train discontinued its service past the falls, in the late 1980s. The train tracks in front of the falls were removed and converted into a recreational trail. Now, the falls and a small park just west of the falls (Bridal Veil Park) can also be accessed via U.S. Highway 189.
- In early 1996, an avalanche destroyed the building housing, the tramway machinery, and a gift shop, and they were never rebuilt.
- In July 2008, an arson fire burned the building at the top of the tramway, and very little remains.
- In August 2008, the Utah County Sheriff's Office ordered the property owners, the Grow family from Orem, to pull down the remaining cable, fearing adventurers might use it to scale the rocky face by the waterfall.
- In October 2016, 2 deaths occurred which put the falls in the hot seat for being a dangerous place to hike, noting that there is about 1 death here per year. Rather, in October and November, the rocks can become very slippery due to the rapid temperature change creating thin layers of ice.
- Starting in April 2017 the remains of the tram and restaurant are to be removed from the site.
- In early 2023, an avalanche ran down the route of the waterfall, altering its landscape and greenery.

== In art, entertainment, and media ==
- The movie Savannah Smiles (1982), contains scenes in Provo Canyon, including Bridal Veil falls. The film also shows a scene with characters in the movie riding the tramway when it was still functioning.

It can also be seen in James Bryan's 1981 horror film Don't go in the Woods.

== Gallery ==
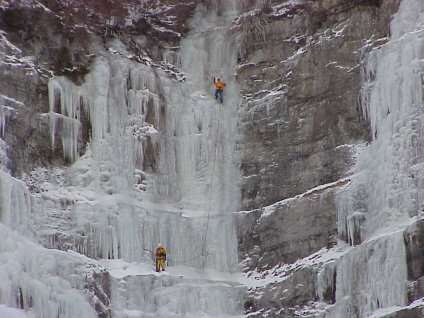
Climbers on the frozen falls, 2003.

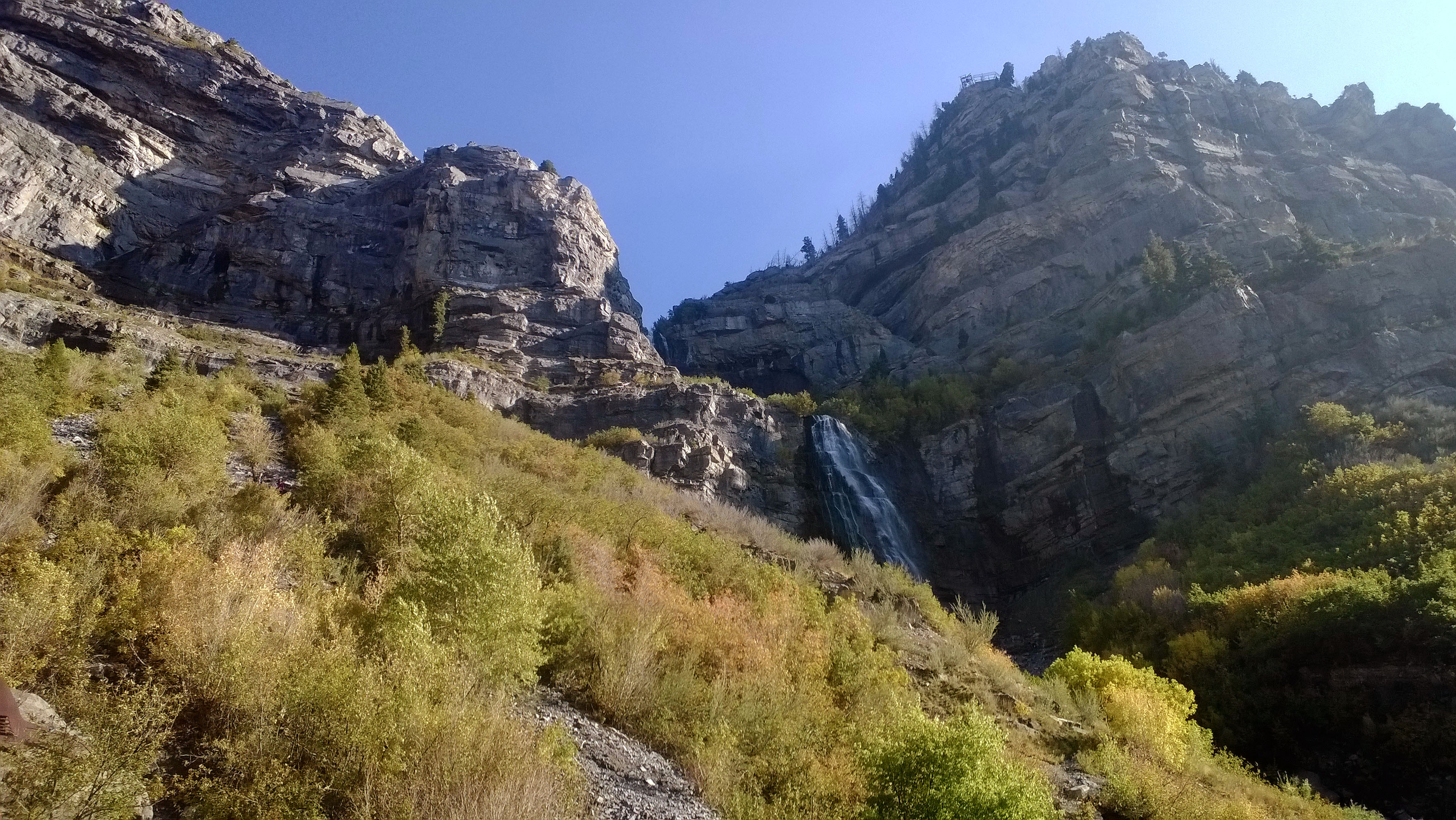
Several hiking trails ascend around Bridal Veil Falls.

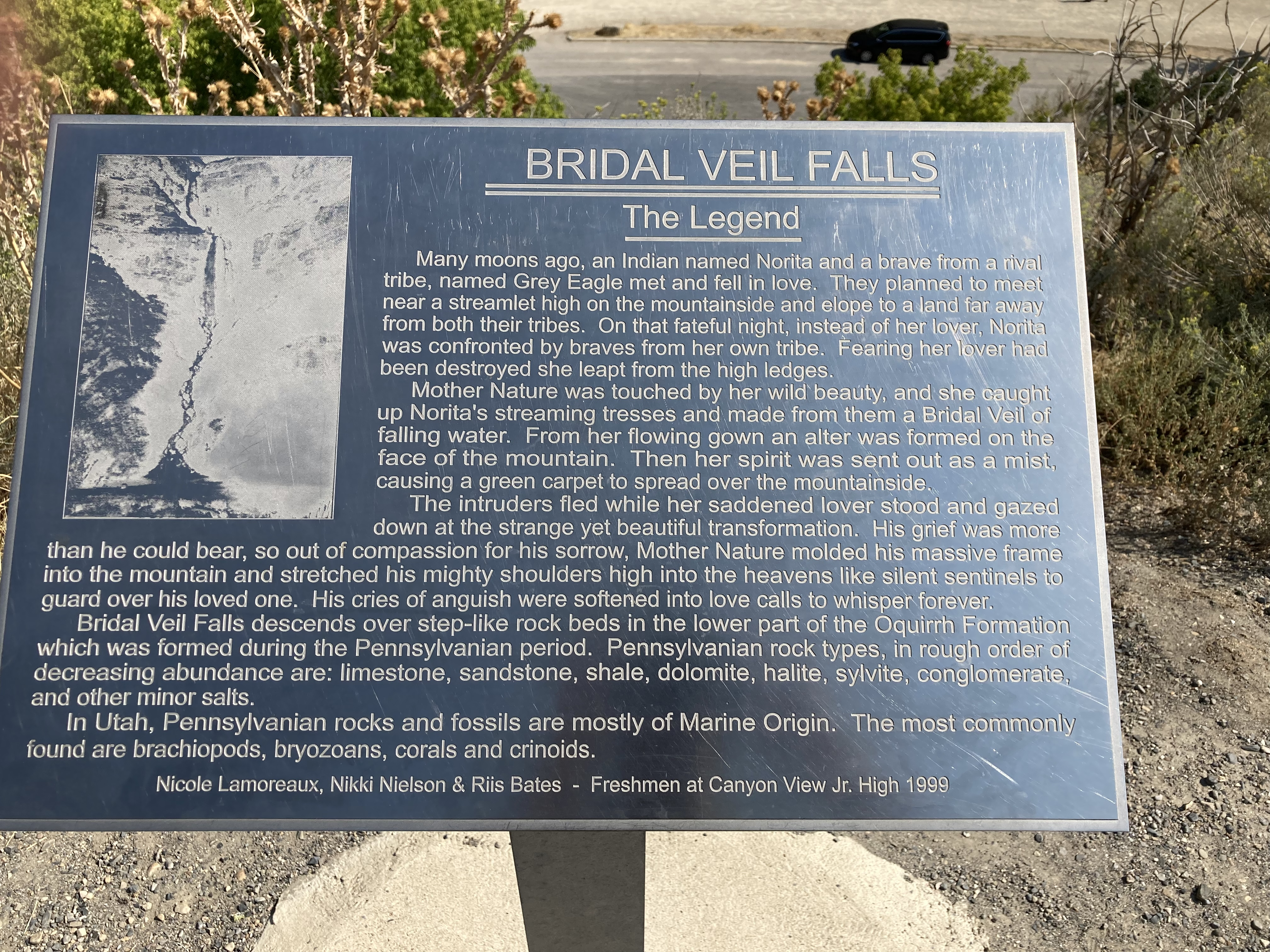
Plaque overlooking Bridal Veil Falls telling a local legend.

== See also ==
- List of waterfalls
- List of waterfalls in Utah
