= Trevor Packer =

College Board executive

- Born: Provo, Utah
- Occupations: Senior Vice President of Advanced Placement and Instruction at the College Board
- Years active: 2003–present

Trevor Packer is an American education executive. He currently serves as the head of the Advanced Placement (AP) Program and the Senior Vice President of Advanced Placement and Instruction at the College Board.

== Personal life ==
Packer was born and raised in Provo, Utah, the first of nine children to Shirlee Packer and Rand Packer. He was raised a member of the Church of Jesus Christ of Latter-day Saints. At age 19, he served as a missionary in Milwaukee, before earning undergraduate and graduate degrees at Brigham Young University in English.

== Advanced Placement ==
Packer began his career with the College Board as a temporary employee for the AP office in New York City while earning a PhD in English. In 1999, Packer was given the title of Assistant Director of Operations. When Lee Jones left the AP program in 2003, Packer took over as the head of the program.

Packer launched sweeping changes to AP courses in the 2012–13 academic year, following recommendations from the National Research Council and the National Academy of Science. The number of multiple-choice questions on the exams was decreased, while various subjects' exam weights shifted to written responses, analysis of sources and data, projects, and portfolios. The redesign of the AP US History course generated significant controversy in 2014.

Packer's rapid expansion of the program generated criticism that AP was financially benefiting from underprepared and underprivileged students taking exams. Packer responded to these criticisms by emphasizing that average test scores had not dropped significantly when access to the courses was expanded. Education policy analysts Chester E. Finn Jr. and Andrew E. Scanlan also found that during the period of rapid growth under Packer, the average AP score "barely budged: 2.84 in 2017, down slightly from 2.88 in 2007," and attributes this to "Packer's own hand [being] on the AP tiller since 2003". Nat Malkus, a researcher at the conservative American Enterprise Institute, praised Packer's expansion of the AP program as the "rarest kind of success in public education".

== See also ==
- Advanced Placement
