= Sundance Resort =

Resort in the Wasatch Range in Utah County, Utah, United States

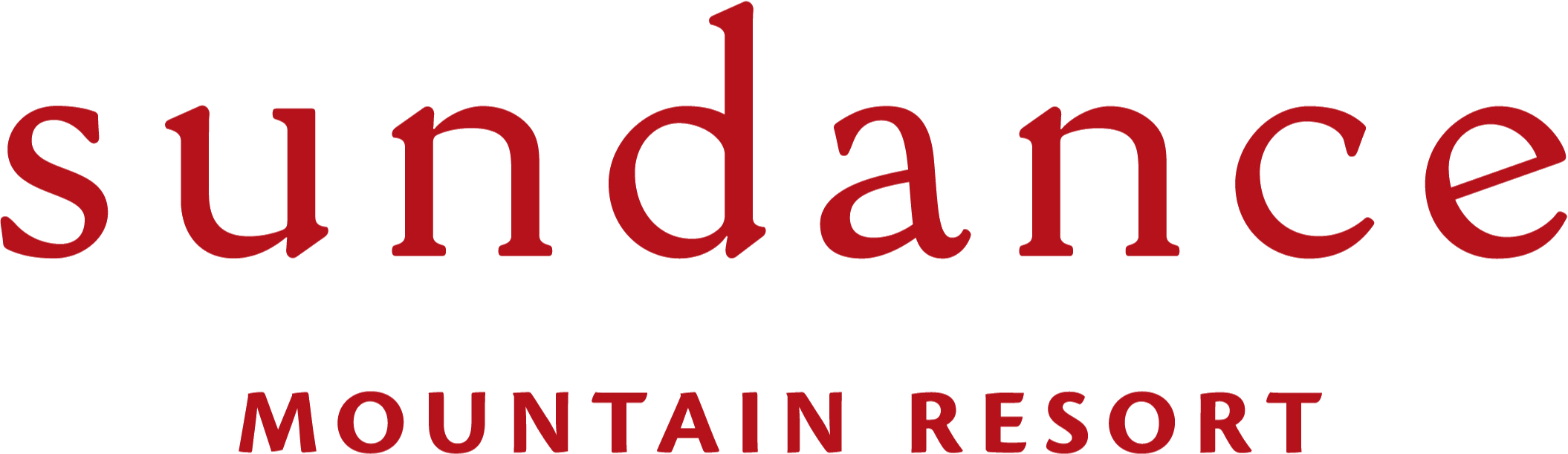

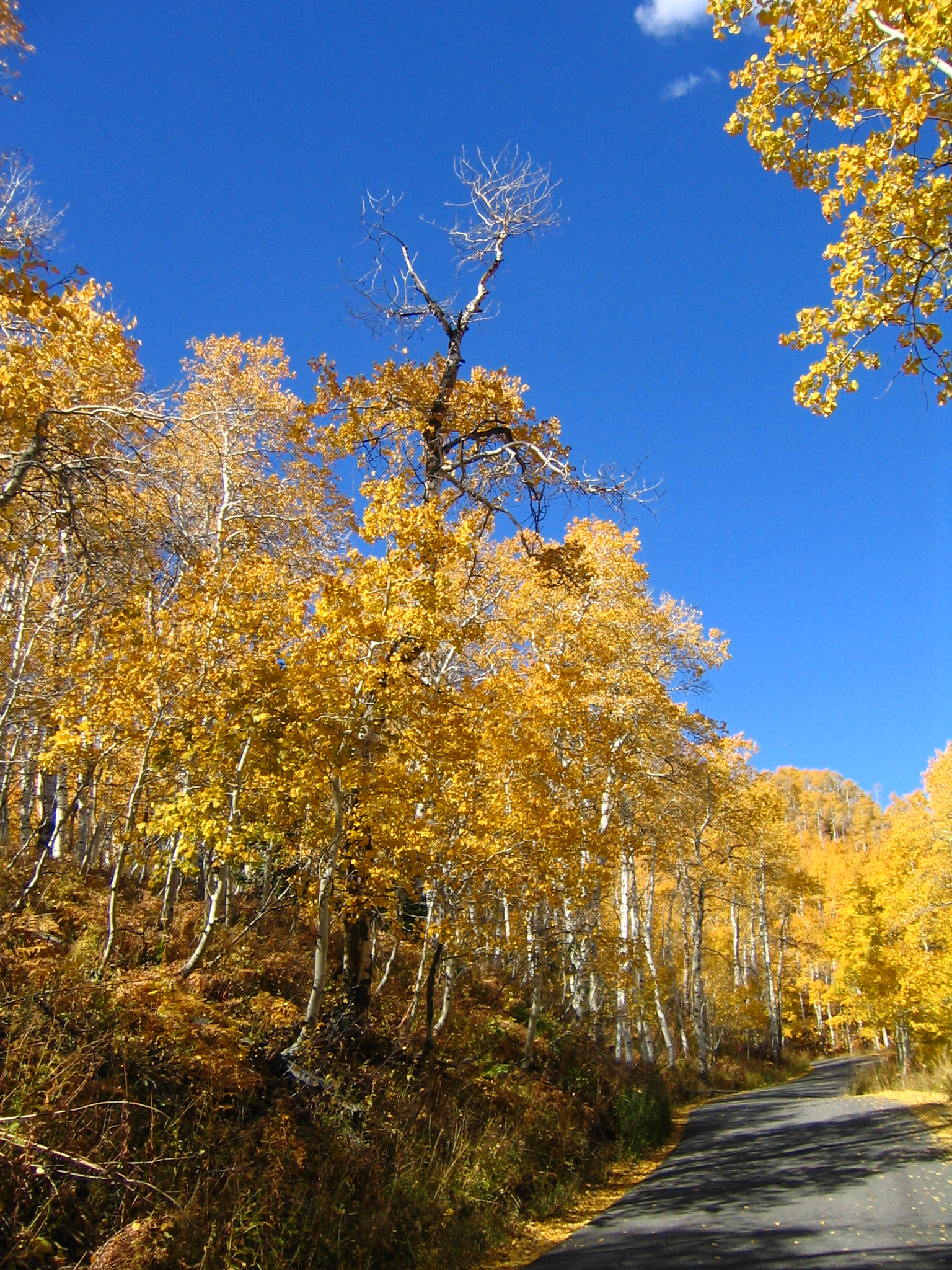
- Sundance in the fall in 2005

- Location in Utah Sundance Resort (the United States)
- Location: Uinta National Forest; Utah County, Utah
- Nearest city: Provo - 13 miles (21 km)
- Coordinates: 40.392°N 111.579°W
- Vertical: 2,150 ft (655 m)
- Top elevation: 8,250 ft (2,515 m)
- Base elevation: 6,100 ft (1,859 m)
- Skiable area: 450 acres (1.8 km^{2})
- Trails: 44
- Lift system: 5 chairlifts (1 high-speed quad, 3 fixed-grip quads, 1 triple); 1 handle tow
- Terrain parks: 2 intermediate/advanced- beginner
- Night skiing: Limited
- Website: sundanceresort.com

Sundance Resort, also known as Sundance Mountain Resort, is a ski resort 13 miles (21 km) northeast of Provo, Utah. It includes more than 5,000 acres (2,000 ha) on the slopes of Mount Timpanogos in Utah's Wasatch Range. Alpine skiing began on the site in 1944. Actor Robert Redford acquired the area in 1968, and eventually established a year-round resort that spawned the independent Sundance Film Festival in 1978 and the nonprofit Sundance Institute in 1980. In 2020, Redford sold the resort to Broadreach Capital Partners and Cedar Capital Partners, but continued to live there until he died in 2025. The resort was first listed as a census-designated place (CDP) before the 2020 census, in which the population was 113.

== History ==
The area known today as the Sundance Resort in the North Fork canyon was surveyed in the mid-1800s by Andrew Jackson Stewart Jr. and his sons, Andrew, Scott, and John Stewart. While working for the U.S. government, they discovered the view of Mt. Timpanogos. They each received 160 acres of land under the Homestead Act, and nearby lots were given to family members. Soon, members of the Stewart family erected log cabins. By 1911, they owned 2,200 acres and were raising sheep and cattle. They formed a company, North Folk Investment Co., to share income and protect the land. The area was known as "Stewart Flats" after the large number of Stewart family members living in the area.

Until 1920, Stewart Flats was connected to the wider world by a single unpaved road with a grade of 18 to 20 degrees on the last half mile. It was referred to as the "big dugway" due to the trench formed from dragging large trees down the road. In the early 1920s, the Utah County Commission built an automobile road that passed through Stewart Falls as it connected the towns of Aspen Grove and Wildwood.

=== Hiking trails ===
Mount Timpanogos became a popular mountain to hike after 1912, when Eugene L. Roberts, a professor at Brigham Young University, opened a hiking trail and began taking students there. The Timpanogos Hike began after mid-July when there was a full moon. The night before the hike, participants would gather for a celebration that usually had a bonfire. A favorite part of the celebration was the enactment of the "Legend of Timpanogos", which tells the story of an Indian princess who falls in love with a soldier who goes off to war; the soldier did not return, but she watched and waited for him atop Mount Timpanogos until she died. Roberts's event spawned an annual Timpanogos Hike.

In 1922, the Forest Service over the Wasatch National Forest, part of the United States Department of Agriculture, requested to put in a trail that crossed part of the property owned by the North Folk Investment Co, The Stewart family appreciated the hikes because they brought more popularity to the area. Today, the trails around the Sundance Mountain Resort offer views of North Fork and Stewart Falls. Many trails also feature plaques that mark flora and fauna in the area and are lined with benches. There are also three major biking trails at Sundance that even have ski-lift service after Memorial Day weekend.

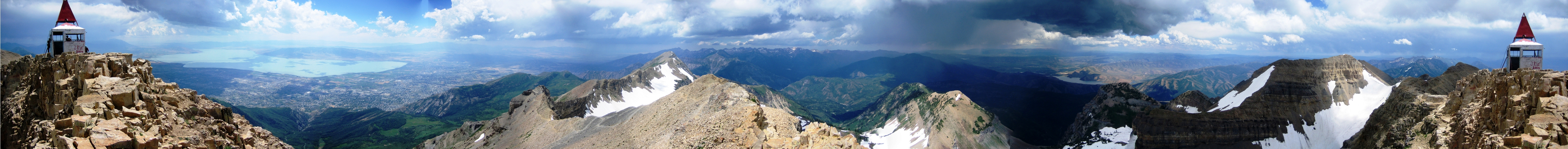
Panoramic view of Mount Timpanogos

=== Timp Haven ===
Ski races began on the Mount Timpanogos Glacier during the annual Timp hike in July 1941. The race was a slalom race. This race was held again in 1947, 1948, and 1949. A ski area later opened as Timp Haven in 1944. The name was chosen by a contest in which anyone could submit their suggestion. Ruth Biddulph submitted the winning name of Timp Haven and was given a season pass. Timp Haven was owned by S. Paul Stewart and run with the help of his brother Ray Stewart for over twenty years. Paul managed the slopes, built the ski lodge, and installed the water system. Ray Stewart was responsible for clearing and developing the Timp Haven Ski Resort and contributed to the original rope tow used. Hilda Stewart, Paul's wife, had a cafe on the resort property and served hamburgers and other meals to ski guests. Paul later purchased the interests of other members of the Stewart family, who altogether owned between 3,000 and 4,000 acres of the property. The investment in the land in North Fork never paid dividends for the North Fork Investment Company owners.

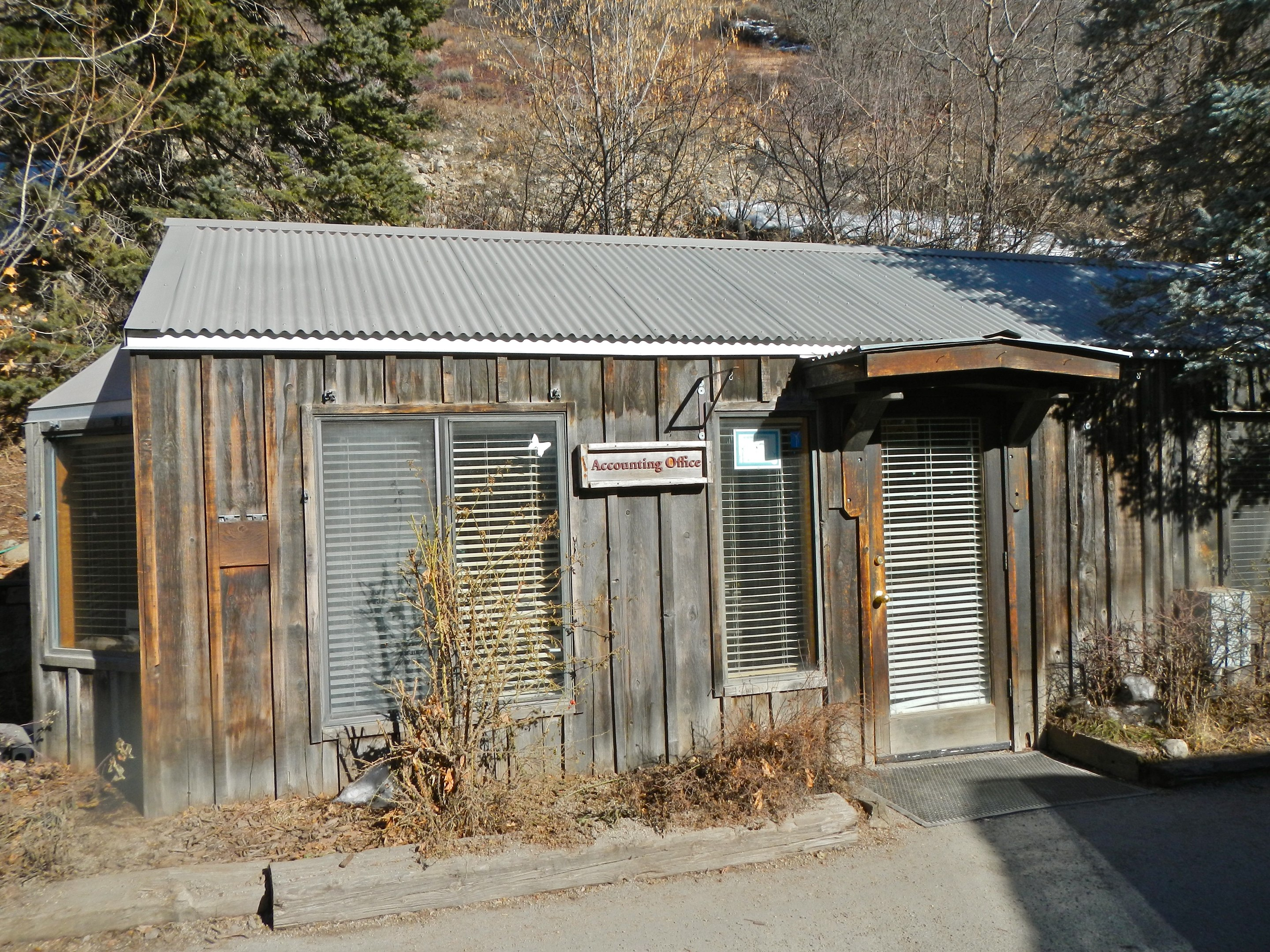
Rustic accounting office at Sundance Mountain Resort

The resort had a rope tow that was built by J.W. Daniel, who had tried to make a tow in Hobble Creek Canyon near Springville, Utah. The tow was powered by a Chevrolet truck, but was unsuccessful in that area. The Timpanogos Mountain Club persuaded Daniel to bring the tow to North Fork Canyon. The tow was not ready for the winter of 1944, and so it was abandoned by the club. Ray Stewart bought the truck and equipment and overhauled it to create a working tow to run on Saturdays and Sundays. The tow was difficult to use, however, because some of the roads leading to the resort were not plowed regularly, making it difficult to drive the truck, and cold mornings caused the vehicle to freeze over. The tow pulled skiers 500 feet up the mountain. In addition, when Timp Haven opened, the creek was closer to the hill than it is today, so skiers had to make a quick turn at the bottom to avoid falling into the water. Ski season at Timp Haven started around Christmas and lasted until early March. A day pass to ski was only $1, and due to lighting installed by Provo City, Timp Haven allowed night skiing on Mondays, Wednesdays, and Fridays. While owned by the Stewart family, the ski area was closed on Sundays. Timp Haven also held ski races that were sponsored by various local organizations like the Timpanogos Ski Club or the Hoover Cup. The Timpanogos Mountain Club cleared an area on the east hill and built a 45-foot ski jump.

Ski classes at the resort were started by Jessie Scofield, the supervisor of Provo City Recreation, in the winter of 1946. Professors at Brigham Young University also started ski classes, bringing buses of students in the afternoons. By that time, Timp Haven also had a tubing and toboggan hill. The Stewart family began expansion in 1947, and a T-bar lift was added at the base in 1948 (the same year as the ski jump was rebuilt) which was about 1,000 feet (300 m) in length, The lower terminal was seated on a platform that was 14 feet in the air. A 1938 Ford truck provided the power for the lift. This lift ran until 1953 when a single chairlift was added in the fall. It had a length of about 2,500 feet (760 m). The first double chairlift was installed in the fall of 1965 and replaced the lower single chair and an upper T-bar, vertically climbing 1,400 feet (430 m). It had an accident the following July which resulted in two fatalities. The resort continued expanding, however, and a lodge was built in 1957 (whose foundation is under the General Store and Grill Room today). A poma lift was added in 1958. A modern ski lift, the Mandan, was installed in 1964, and the two T-bar lifts were removed. The Navajo lift was installed in 1969, and the Arrowhead lift in 1985.

=== Ownership under Robert Redford ===
The Stewart family built a subdivision on "Stewart Flats" in the 1960s called Timp Haven Homes. Robert Redford purchased a 2-acre lot for $500 (equivalent to $4,629 in 2025).

In August 1968, Redford purchased the Timp Haven resort. He renamed it the Sundance Mountain Resort, after the role he played in the 1969 film Butch Cassidy and the Sundance Kid. The resort is not to be confused with the town of Sundance, Wyoming, from which the Sundance Kid drew his name. Redford's 1972 film Jeremiah Johnson was filmed near the resort.

==== Sundance Institute and Film Festival ====
Because of its lower elevation, the resort had a shorter ski season than its competitors. To increase revenue, Redford wanted to create an Aspen-like atmosphere and use the resort to promote the arts and draw in Hollywood stars.

In November 1979, Redford held a 3-day conference for filmmakers and professional artists at Sundance, aiming to promote indie filmmakers. This laid the foundation for the Sundance Institute, founded In 1981 to foster and celebrate the diversity of American filmmaking.

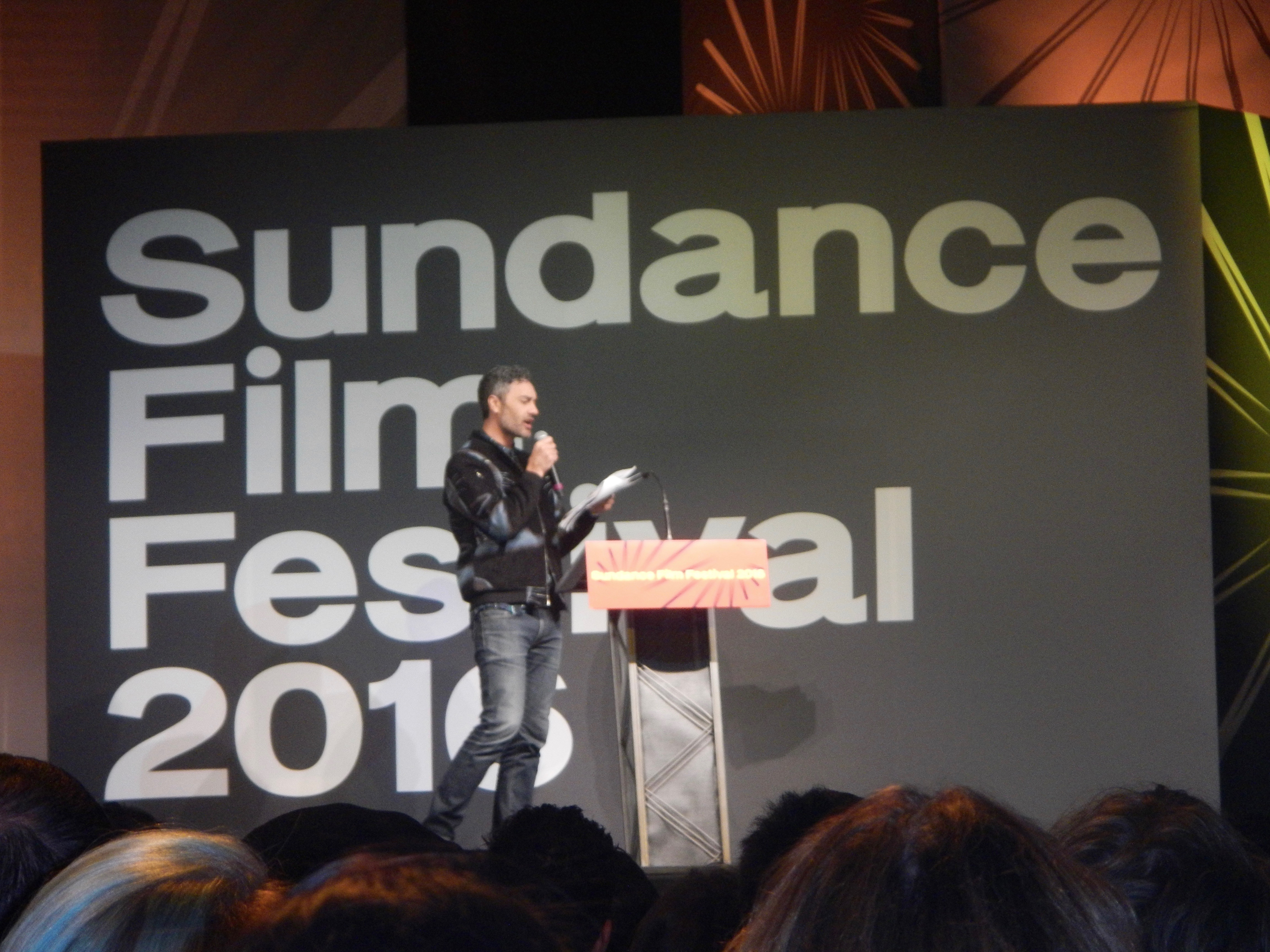
Taika Waititi at the Sundance Film Festival in 2016

The U.S. Film Festival was first held in 1978. Beginning in 1985, the festival was held at Sundance and organized by the Sundance Institute. Redford was reluctant to take control of the festival, and in its early years, it was "regarded by many [film] distributors as toxic". The 1989 festival gained wider recognition after it showed Steven Soderbergh's Sex, Lies, and Videotape. In 1991, the name was officially changed to the Sundance Film Festival. Although it has increased in popularity, the film festival has maintained its support of the making and distribution of indie films.

Prior to 2027, the Sundance Film Festival was held each year in January, primarily 30 miles (50 km) north in Park City, and is a popular and well-known competition for independent film makers. It is the largest independent film festival in the United States, and also one of the largest in the world. The festival receives over 9,000 submissions and chooses 200 documentaries, large films, and small films to screen. More than 50,000 people attend the festival each year. The 2026 Sundance Film Festival would be the final Sundance Film Festival held in Park City, with the festival afterwards transiting out of state to Boulder, Colorado. However, the Sundance resort will still be home to the Sundance Institute Labs.

The small town that surrounds the resort is home to 28 full-time residents, with many residents living in the area for more than 50 years. People who have owned residences in the Sundance Resort properties include Sydney Pollack, William Devane, and Daniel Melnick.

=== New ownership ===
On December 11, 2020, Robert Redford announced to employees that he was selling the 2,600-acre resort to Broadreach Capital Partners and Cedar Capital Partners.

Though the resort has been Redford's Utah home for more than a half-century, it also "created a lot of weight for me to be carrying around", Redford told the Salt Lake Tribune ahead of the announcement. "I had been searching for years for the right people to take it to the next level, so that I could take that weight off my shoulders and enjoy my life".

As part of the sale, Broadreach and Cedar promised to continue Redford's policies of responsible development and land preservation. The resort's 2,600 acres include 1,845 acres that are preserved through a conservation easement and protective covenants. Redford also stipulated that 1,200 acres of land he continued to own would not be developed.

Redford continued to live in his home of six decades near the resort, and he died there on September 16, 2025.

== Climate ==
Climate data for Sundance, Utah, 1991–2020 normals, 1997-2007 precip/snow: 6620ft (2018m)
Month	Jan	Feb	Mar	Apr	May	Jun	Jul	Aug	Sep	Oct	Nov	Dec	Year
Mean daily maximum °F (°C)	31.5 (−0.3)	33.4 (0.8)	41.8 (5.4)	49.4 (9.7)	61.7 (16.5)	73.2 (22.9)	80.8 (27.1)	79.5 (26.4)	67.7 (19.8)	52.8 (11.6)	40.2 (4.6)	30.9 (−0.6)	53.6 (12.0)
Daily mean °F (°C)	25.3 (−3.7)	26.9 (−2.8)	34.1 (1.2)	40.6 (4.8)	51.0 (10.6)	61.2 (16.2)	69.2 (20.7)	68.0 (20.0)	57.2 (14.0)	44.4 (6.9)	33.4 (0.8)	24.8 (−4.0)	44.7 (7.1)
Mean daily minimum °F (°C)	19.2 (−7.1)	20.4 (−6.4)	26.4 (−3.1)	31.7 (−0.2)	40.2 (4.6)	49.3 (9.6)	57.6 (14.2)	56.4 (13.6)	46.7 (8.2)	36.0 (2.2)	26.5 (−3.1)	18.6 (−7.4)	35.8 (2.1)
Average precipitation inches (mm)	6.76 (172)	4.62 (117)	3.19 (81)	3.96 (101)	2.94 (75)	2.17 (55)	0.83 (21)	1.63 (41)	2.01 (51)	3.34 (85)	3.44 (87)	4.98 (126)	39.87 (1,012)
Average snowfall inches (cm)	40.60 (103.1)	38.10 (96.8)	25.90 (65.8)	16.20 (41.1)	2.90 (7.4)	0.00 (0.00)	0.00 (0.00)	0.00 (0.00)	0.20 (0.51)	3.20 (8.1)	19.70 (50.0)	41.60 (105.7)	188.4 (478.51)
Source 1: NOAA
Source 2: XMACIS2 (precipitation & snowfall)

== Recent developments ==
=== Skiing trails ===
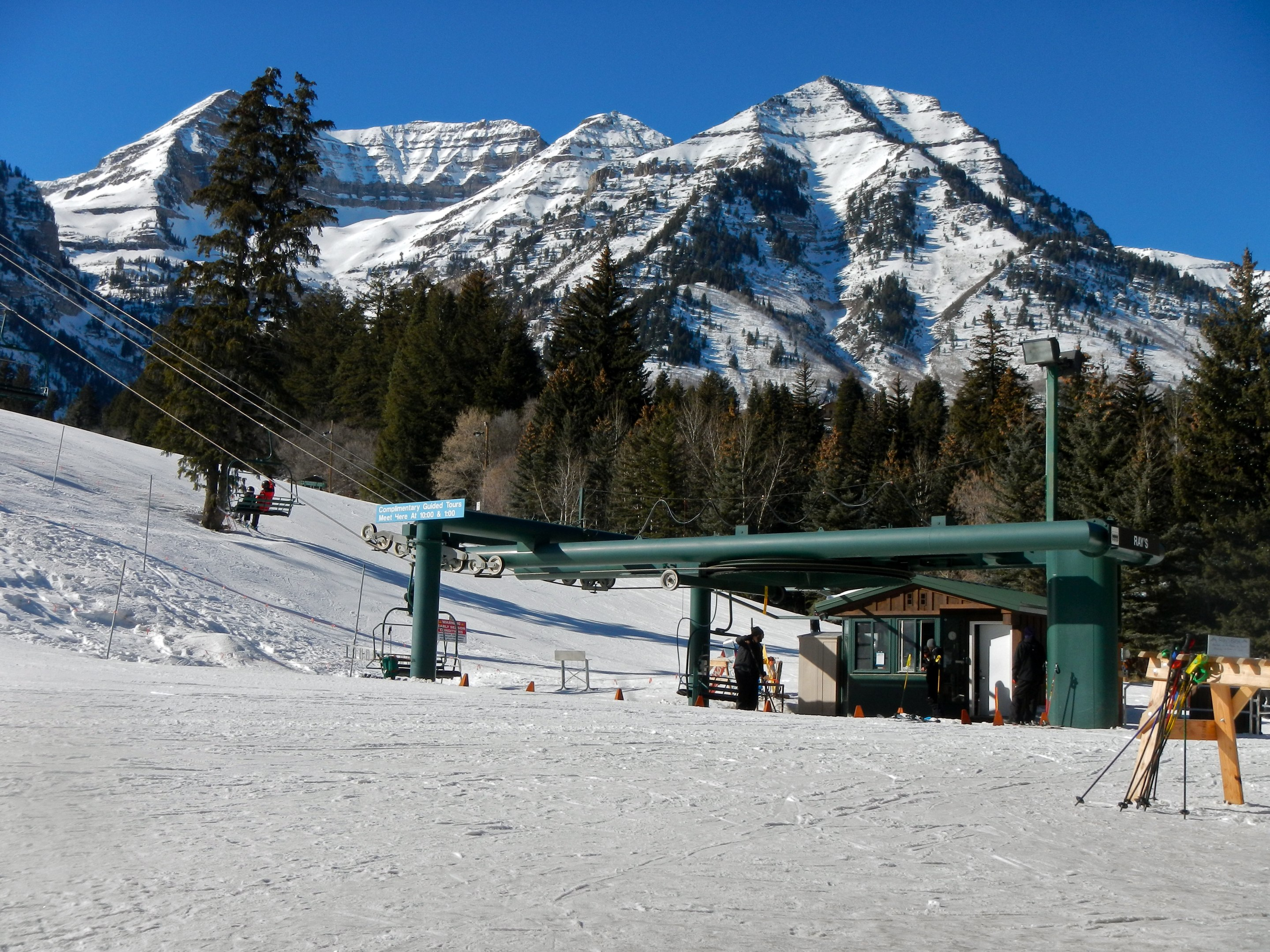
Ski lift at Sundance Mountain Resort

Today, Sundance Mountain Resort has skiing for every ability, with 20% beginner trails, 40% intermediate trails, and 40% advanced trails. The resort terrain climbs 2,150 vertical feet (655 m) up the northeast slope of Mount Timpanogos, reaching the crest of the ridge at Bearclaw Cabin. This restaurant at the resort's apex of 8,250 feet (2,515 m) provides spectacular 360° views of the surrounding landscape, and of Mount Timpanogos as it rises to a height just short of 12,000 ft (3,660 m).

=== Chairlifts ===
The resort has six chairlifts, which includes one high-speed chair, and a handle tow for beginners at the mountain's base.

In 1994, CTEC added a fixed-grip quad lift, named Ray's, to honor Ray Stewart and his work in developing Timp Haven. The lift offered direct access to the back of the mountain and covered over 5,400 feet with a vertical rise of 1,400 feet, with an uphill capacity of 1,800 people per hour.

In 2016, the Arrowhead triple was retired and replaced with a fixed-grip quad made by Doppelmayr USA. The new lift was named Red's, after Redford and his family, and carried 500 more people uphill per hour than its predecessor.

For the 2021-2022 season, Doppelmayr USA built two chairlifts to replace Ray's lift. The front side portion was replaced by a high-speed quad, known as the Outlaw Express, running on an alignment previously used by the Mandan double chairlift that Ray's replaced, with a mid-unload station below Marmot Gulch to serve beginner terrain that had been accessible from the winter mid-station on Ray's. The backside portion was replaced with a new fixed-grip quad called Stairway, which ran from the bottom of Red's to the Mandan summit.

In May 2025, Sundance announced that a new high-speed quad by Doppelmayer, named Electric Horseman Express, would open in 2026. The lift will serve 165 acres of new terrain and transport skiers near the top of Red's lift. The lift's name alludes to Redford's 1979 film The Electric Horseman.

As of 2016, Sundance had the 6th-longest zip line in the United States, which has the most vertical drop of any zip line on the North American continent.
