= Lake Superior and Ishpeming 24 =

Preserved American 2-8-0 steam locomotive (LS&I class SC-4)

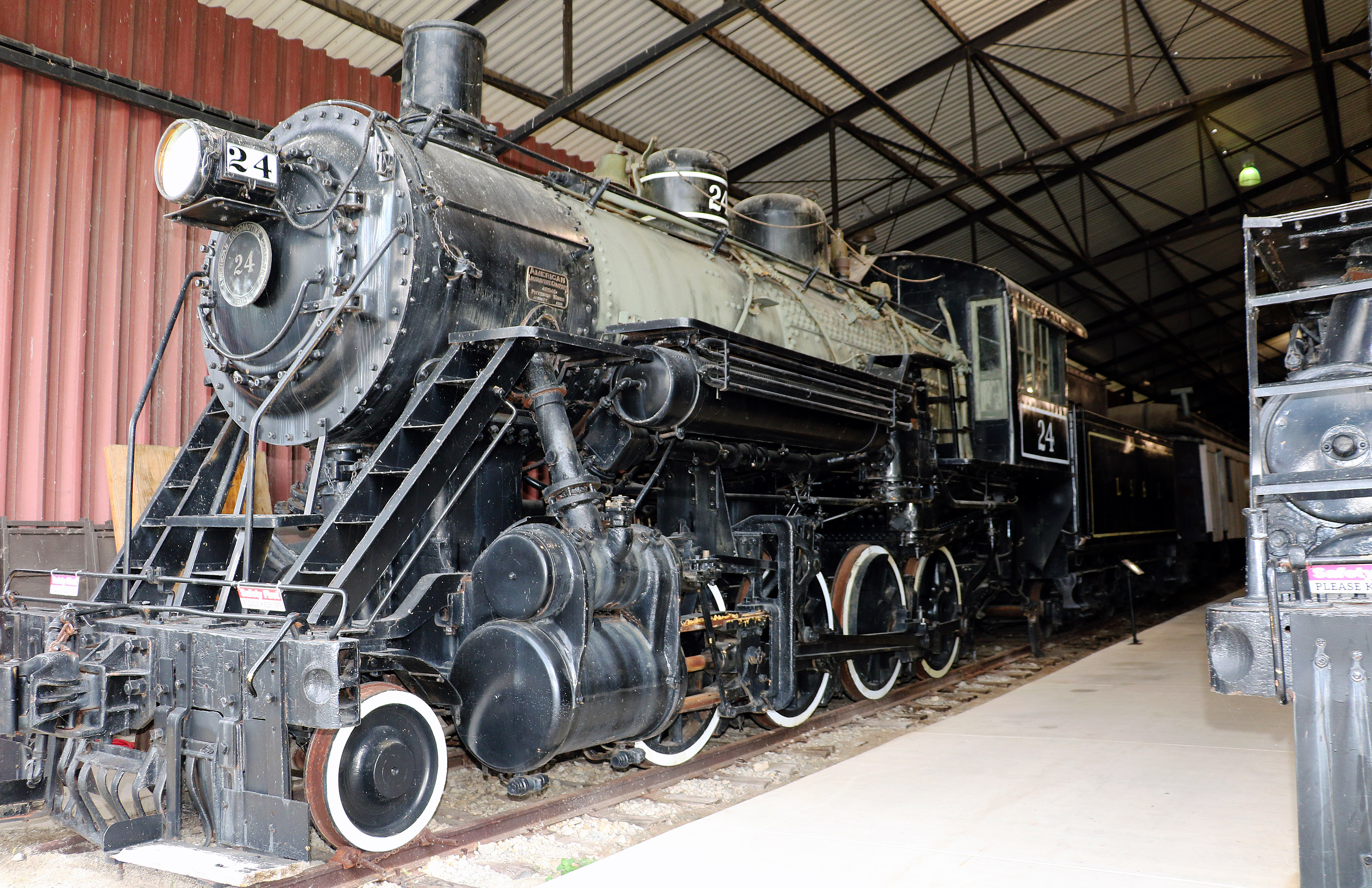
- No. 24 on display inside the National Railroad Museum's Victor McCormick Train Pavilion barn, August 2021
Type and origin
- Power type: Steam
- Builder: American Locomotive Company (Pittsburg Works)
- Serial number: 46946
- Build date: January 1910
- Rebuilder: Lake Superior and Ishpeming Railroad
- Rebuild date: 1930
Specifications
- Configuration
  - Whyte: 2-8-0
  - UIC: 1'D'h
- Gauge: 4 ft 8 1/2 in (1,435 mm)
- Driver dia.: New: 48 in (1,200 mm); Now: 55 in (1,400 mm)
- Adhesive weight: 168,000 lb (76,000 kg)
- Loco weight: 189,360 lb (85,890 kg)
- Tender weight: 125,700 lb (57,000 kg)
- Total weight: 315,060 lb (142,910 kg)
- Fuel type: Coal
- Fuel capacity: 10.8 t (10.6 long tons; 11.9 short tons)
- Water cap.: 8,700 US gal (33,000 L; 7,200 imp gal)
- Boiler pressure: 200 psi (1,400 kPa)
- Cylinders: Two, outside
- Cylinder size: New: 20 in × 28 in (510 mm × 710 mm); Now: 22 in × 28 in (560 mm × 710 mm)
- Valve gear: New: Baker; Now: Walschaerts
- Valve type: Piston valves
- Loco brake: Air
- Train brakes: Air
- Couplers: Knuckle
Performance figures
- Tractive effort: 42,000 lbf (190,000 N)
Career
- Operators: Marquette and Southeastern Railway; Munising, Marquette and Southeastern Railway; Lake Superior and Ishpeming Railroad; National Railroad Museum
- Class: New: C-5; Now: SC-4
- Number in class: 8th of 8
- Numbers: M&SE 40; MM&SE 40; LS&I 24
- Retired: October 1972
- Current owner: National Railroad Museum
- Disposition: On static display

Lake Superior and Ishpeming 24 is an SC-4 class 2-8-0 "Consolidation" type steam locomotive, built by the American Locomotive Company's (ALCO) Pittsburg Works in 1910 for the Marquette and Southeastern Railway as No. 40. It was renumbered to 24 in 1924, when the Marquette and Southeastern was absorbed into the Lake Superior and Ishpeming Railroad (LS&I).

In 1962, No. 24 was donated to the National Railroad Museum (NRM) in Ashwaubenon, Wisconsin, where it briefly ran excursion trains until 1972, when it was removed from service from worn out side rods and smoke complaints from nearby residents. As of 2026, No. 24 remains on static display.

== History ==
=== Design and upgrades ===
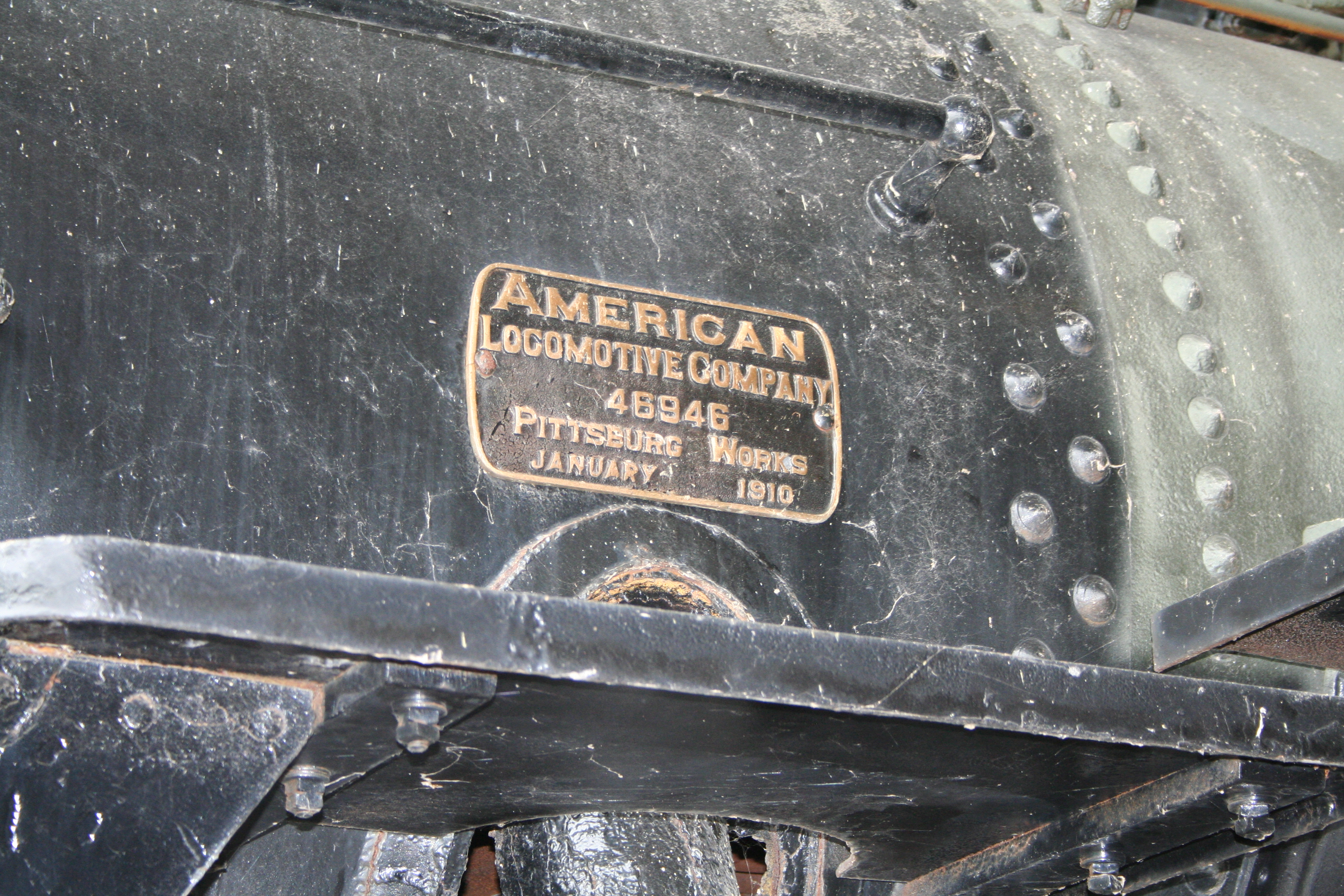
No. 24's builder's plate

In 1910, the Marquette and Southeastern Railway (M&SE), which operated logging and iron ore trains and connected the neighboring Munising Railway with the Lake Superior and Ishpeming (LS&I), ordered three 2-8-0 "Consolidations" from the American Locomotive Company's (ALCO) Pittsburg Works, at a price of $14,335 each. (Note: The location was known as Pittsburg at the time these locomotives were built from 1891 till 1911.) The three 2-8-0s (Nos. 38–40) were duplicates of the LS&I's C-5 class (Nos. 9–13), and they were all initially designed with outside Pilliod valve gear, 20-by-28-inch (510 mm × 710 mm) cylinders, and 48-inch (1,200 mm) diameter driving wheels, and they were rated at a tractive effort of around 34,000 pounds-force (150 kN).

Nos. 38–40 were built with saturated keyhole fireboxes placed between their rear sets of driving wheels, reducing their abilities to produce steam. In 1911, the M&SE merged with the Munising Railway to form the Munising, Marquette and Southeastern Railway (MM&SE). In 1924, the MM&SE merged into the LS&I, which reorganized their expanded operations and renumbered the locomotives. MM&SE Nos. 38–40 were renumbered as Nos. 18–25 and grouped with LS&I C-5s Nos. 9–13.

LS&I C-5 class numbers and details
Pre-1924 Nos.	Post-1924 Nos.	ALCO serial numbers	Notes
LS&I 9	LS&I 23	46939	Rebuilt into an SC-4 in 1928. Preserved.
LS&I 10	LS&I 25	46940	Remained as a C-5. Scrapped in 1956.
LS&I 11	LS&I 18	46941	Rebuilt into an SC-4 in 1930. Preserved.
LS&I 12	LS&I 19	46942	Rebuilt into an SC-4 in 1934. Preserved.
LS&I 13	LS&I 20	46943	Rebuilt into an SC-4 in 1929. Preserved.
MM&SE 38	LS&I 22	46944	Rebuilt into an SC-4 in 1929. Preserved.
MM&SE 39	LS&I 21	46945	Rebuilt into an SC-4 in 1930. Preserved.
MM&SE 40	LS&I 24	46946	Rebuilt into an SC-4 in 1930. Preserved.

From 1928 to 1934, the C-5 locomotives, except No. 25, were sent to the LS&I's Presque Isle locomotive shops to be rebuilt and modified to improve their performances. Their cylinder saddles were replaced by ones with superheated cylinders and piston valves; their boilers received superheaters and were raised higher above the frame; their fireboxes were widened and received Nicholson thermic siphons; and feedwater heaters were installed. The upgrades raised the C-5s' tractive effort to around 42,000 pounds-force (187 kN), and they were reclassified as SC-4s.

=== Revenue service ===
No. 24 was originally numbered 40, as it was the third of the M&SE's group of three 2-8-0s delivered from ALCO. The M&SE used Nos. 38–40, along with Baldwin-built 2-8-0s Nos. 36–37, as their primary locomotives, being assigned to all services the railway provided: passenger service, mixed freight service, iron ore service, and mine-switching service. No. 40's road number remained unchanged after the M&SE merged into the MM&SE in 1911, but after the MM&SE was absorbed into the LS&I in 1924, No. 40 was renumbered to 24, and Nos. 38 and 39 became Nos. 22 and 21.

In 1930, No. 24 was sent to the LS&I's Presque Isle shops and rebuilt as an SC-4. The locomotive was subsequently reassigned to switch hopper cars and to pull logging trains on branch lines. Throughout the 1950s, the LS&I slowly retired their steam fleet and replaced them with diesel locomotives, but the SC-4s remained on the roster to help thaw frozen iron ore during the winter months, and they continued to switch hopper cars. All of them, were retired throughout 1962, when the LS&I completed its dieselization.

=== National Railroad Museum ===
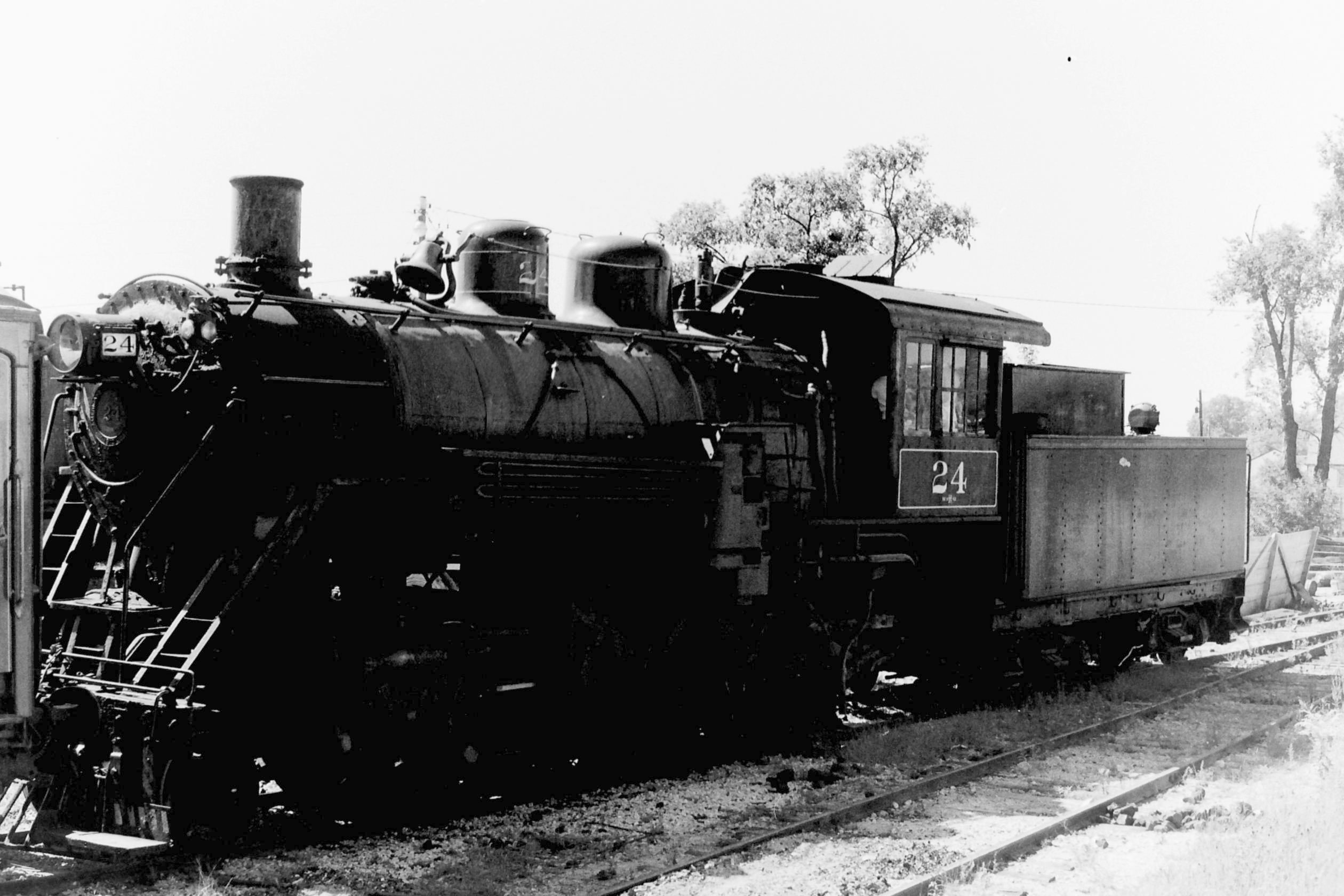
No. 24 at the National Railroad Museum, August 1970

Almost all the SC-4s were preserved because they were purchased by John A. Zerbal for use on his Marquette and Huron Mountain (M&HM) tourist railroad. No. 24 was the exception: in May 1962, it was donated to the National Railroad Museum (NRM). It travelled with LS&I passenger car No. 62 and combine car No. 63 to the museum's location in Green Bay, Wisconsin, and the LS&I's president, J. H. Kline, personally presented No. 24 to the museum, coinciding with 2-10-2 No. 506 being presented by Dan J. Smith of the Duluth, Missabe and Iron Range Railway.

Since No. 24 was still in operable condition, the NRM opted to use it to pull their tourist excursion trains throughout their park area and to switch the museum's locomotives and rolling stock, and it was extensively used for the next ten years. In the early 1970s, No. 24's side rods were found to be worn out, and by that time, the museum had received a number of complaints from nearby residents over noise disturbances and smoke pollution. To appease the residents, the NRM saw fit to replace No. 24 with a gas-powered switcher in their operations, and the SC-4 was last fired up in October 1972, before it was placed on static display. As of 2026, No. 24 remains on display inside of the National Railroad Museum's Victor McCormick Train Pavilion barn.

== See also ==
- Chicago and North Western 175
- Duluth and Northern Minnesota 14
- Grand Canyon Railway 29
- Lake Superior and Ishpeming 33
- Sumter and Choctaw 102
- United States Army 101

== Bibliography ==
- Durocher, Aurele (April 1958). "The Lake Superior and Ishpeming Railroad Company". The Railway and Locomotive Historical Society Bulletin (98): 13–31. JSTOR 43520202.
- Schauer, David (2015). Lake Superior & Ishpeming Railroad In Color. Vol. 1. Scotch Plains, New Jersey: Morning Sun Books, Inc. ISBN 978-1-58248-494-5.
- Zahrt, Chris (May 2009). "Wandering No. 18's many lives". Trains. Vol. 69, no. 5. Kalmbach Media. pp. 45–51.
