= Lake Superior and Ishpeming 19 =

Preserved American 2-8-0 locomotive (LS&I class SC-4)

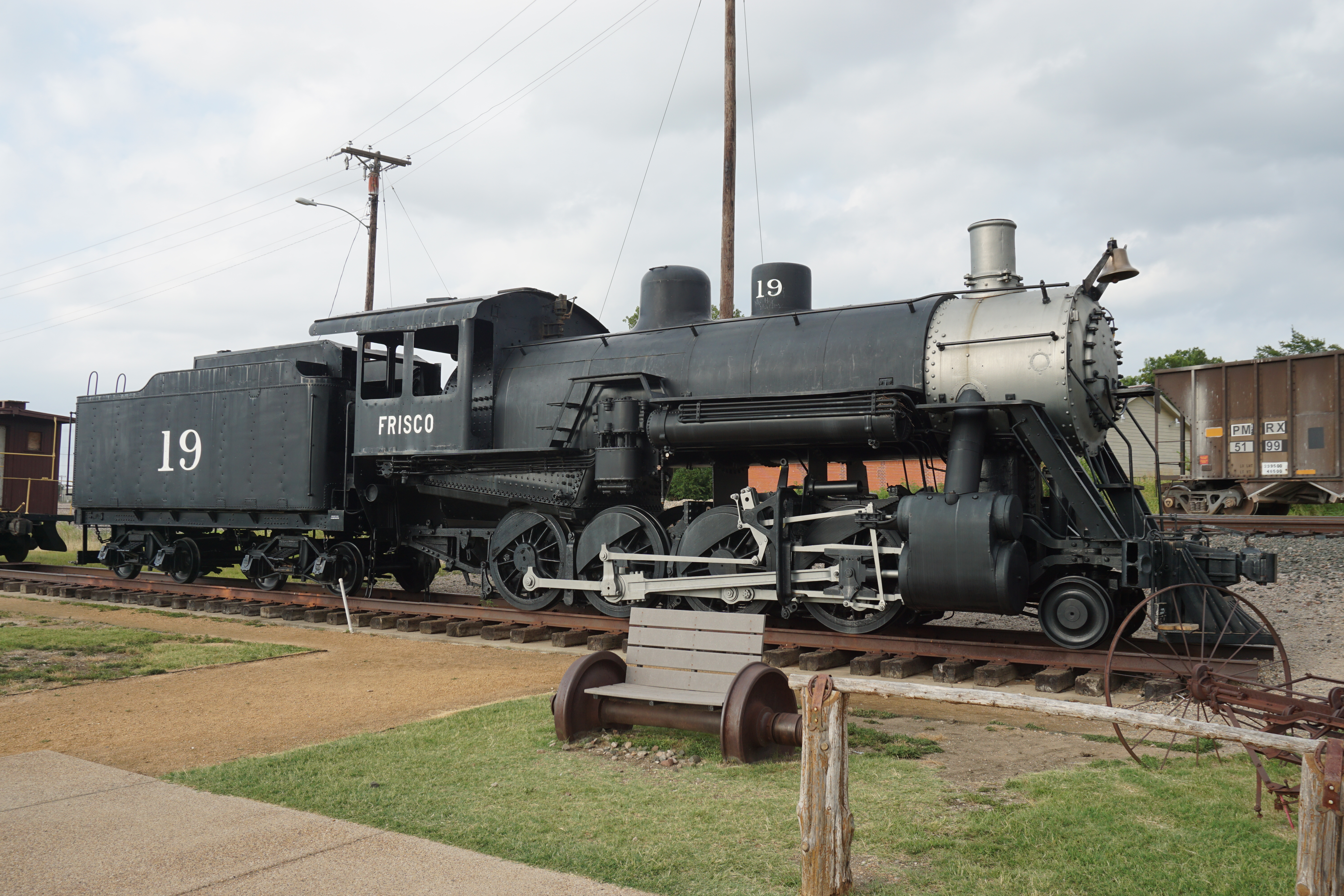
- No. 19 on display outside the Frisco Heratige Museum, July 4, 2016
Type and origin
- Power type: Steam
- Builder: American Locomotive Company (Pittsburg Works)
- Serial number: 46942
- Build date: January 1910
- Rebuilder: Lake Superior and Ishpeming Railroad
- Rebuild date: 1934
Specifications
- Configuration
  - Whyte: 2-8-0
  - UIC: 1'D'h
- Gauge: 4 ft 8 1/2 in (1,435 mm)
- Driver dia.: New: 48 in (1,200 mm); Now: 55 in (1,400 mm)
- Adhesive weight: 168,000 lb (76,000 kg)
- Loco weight: 189,360 lb (85,890 kg)
- Tender weight: 125,700 lb (57,000 kg)
- Total weight: 315,060 lb (142,910 kg)
- Fuel type: Coal
- Fuel capacity: 10.8 t (10.6 long tons; 11.9 short tons)
- Water cap.: 8,700 US gal (33,000 L; 7,200 imp gal)
- Boiler pressure: 200 psi (1,400 kPa)
- Cylinders: Two, outside
- Cylinder size: New: 20 in × 28 in (510 mm × 710 mm); Now: 22 in × 28 in (560 mm × 710 mm)
- Valve gear: New: Baker; Now: Walschaerts
- Valve type: Piston valves
- Loco brake: Air
- Train brakes: Air
- Couplers: Knuckle
Performance figures
- Tractive effort: 42,000 lbf (190,000 N)
Career
- Operators: Marquette and Southeastern Railway; Munising, Marquette and Southeastern Railway; Lake Superior and Ishpeming Railroad; Marquette and Huron Mountain Railroad
- Class: New: C-5; Now: SC-4
- Numbers: M&SE 12; MM&SE 12; LS&I 12; LS&I 19; M&HM 19; GCR 19; SLSF 19
- Retired: September 1962 (revenue service); August 1966 (excursion service)
- Restored: 1964 (excursion service); 1993 (cosmetically)
- Current owner: Frisco Heritage Museum
- Disposition: On static display

Lake Superior and Ishpeming 19 is an SC-4 class 2-8-0 "Consolidation" type steam locomotive, built by the American Locomotive Company's (ALCO) Pittsburg Works in 1910 for the Upper Michigan-based Lake Superior and Ishpeming Railroad (LS&I). The locomotive, originally numbered 12, became No. 19 in 1924. It pulled carloads of iron ore and some passenger trains on branch lines until 1962.

In 1963, No. 19 was purchased by the Marquette and Huron Mountain tourist railroad, which used it to pull their excursion trains between Marquette and Big Bay until 1966. After the M&HM closed in 1984, No. 19 passed through the hands of several owners. From 1993 to 2003, it was displayed in Grand Canyon Railway (GCR) livery at the MGM Grand Adventure theme park in Las Vegas, Nevada. In 2004, No. 19 was sold to the city of Frisco, Texas, where, as of 2026, it remains on static display.

== History ==
=== Design and upgrades ===
In 1909, the Lake Superior and Ishpeming (LS&I), which operated logging and iron ore trains in the Upper Peninsula of Michigan, ordered five 2-8-0 "Consolidations" (Nos. 9–13) from the American Locomotive Company's (ALCO) Pittsburg Works, for $14,335 apiece. (Note: The location was known as Pittsburg at the time these locomotives were built from 1891 till 1911.) The C-5s had outside Pilliod valve gear, 20-by-28-inch (510 mm × 710 mm) cylinders, and 48-inch (1,200 mm) diameter driving wheels. Saturated keyhole fireboxes between their rear sets of driving wheels reduced their ability to produce steam. Their tractive effort was rated around 34,000 pounds-force (150 kN).

In 1923, the LS&I added three more C-5s (Nos. 38, 29, and 40) when it absorbed the Munising, Marquette and Southeastern Railway (MM&SE). When the LS&I reincorporated the following year, it renumbered almost all of its locomotives; the C-5s were renumbered 18 to 25.

LS&I C-5 class numbers and details
Pre-1924 Nos.	Post-1924 Nos.	ALCO serial numbers	Notes
LS&I 9	LS&I 23	46939	Rebuilt into an SC-4 in 1928. Preserved.
LS&I 10	LS&I 25	46940	Remained as a C-5. Scrapped in 1956.
LS&I 11	LS&I 18	46941	Rebuilt into an SC-4 in 1930. Preserved.
LS&I 12	LS&I 19	46942	Rebuilt into an SC-4 in 1934. Preserved.
LS&I 13	LS&I 20	46943	Rebuilt into an SC-4 in 1929. Preserved.
MM&SE 38	LS&I 22	46944	Rebuilt into an SC-4 in 1929. Preserved.
MM&SE 39	LS&I 21	46945	Rebuilt into an SC-4 in 1930. Preserved.
MM&SE 40	LS&I 24	46946	Rebuilt into an SC-4 in 1930. Preserved.

Between 1928 and 1934, the LS&I sent its C-5 class locomotives, except No. 25, to its Presque Isle locomotive shops to be rebuilt and modified to improve their performance. Their cylinder saddles were replaced by ones with superheated cylinders and piston valves; their boilers received superheaters and were raised higher above the frame; their fireboxes were widened and received Nicholson thermic siphons; and feedwater heaters were installed. The upgrades raised the C-5s' tractive effort to around 42,000 pounds (19 tonnes), and the rebuilt locomotives were reclassified as SC-4s.

=== Revenue service ===
No. 12 was the fourth of the LS&I's original C-5s. In its early years, the locomotive pulled mixed freight trains and occasional iron ore trains, but its poor steaming capabilities made it prone to stalling on steep grades and when trains exceeded its pulling power. It was renumbered No. 19 in 1924.

In 1934, No. 19 was extensively rebuilt at the LS&I's Presque Isle shops, becoming the last of the seven C-5s to be converted into SC-4s. The modified locomotive was primarily reassigned to switch hopper cars at iron ore mines and to pull logging trains on branch lines. Throughout the 1950s, the LS&I slowly retired their steam fleet and replaced them with diesel locomotives. In September 1962, No. 19 made its final runs for the LS&I, and the railroad discontinued commercial steam operations.

=== Marquette and Huron Mountain Railroad ownership ===
In the early 1960s, the Marquette and Huron Mountain Railroad (M&HM), a for-profit shortline railroad founded by Certified Public Accountant (CPA) John A. Zerbal, negotiated with the LS&I to acquire their 23.74-mile (38.21 km) Big Bay Branch between Marquette and Big Bay, which had been put up for abandonment due to a lack of customers. Zerbal saw potential in restoring the line as a tourist railroad with restored LS&I equipment, and with Marquette County averaging 700,000 visitors a year at the time, he envisioned a Disneyland-inspired resort complex in Big Bay, which he dubbed "Superiorland". With support from fellow investors, one of whom envisioned Big Bay as an alternative to Aspen, Colorado, the M&HM concluded negotiations with the LS&I in December 1962, for a purchase of numerous locomotives, rolling stock, and the branch.

That same month, No. 19, along with fellow SC-4 No. 23, became the first locomotives to be bought by the M&HM for $11,000: $5,000 for their scrap value and $6,000 for having them overhauled. On July 2, 1963, the Interstate Commerce Commission (ICC) approved the sale of the Big Bay Branch to the M&HM, and the following month, the railroad completely obtained the rest of the LS&I's retired steam locomotives (SC-4s Nos. 18, 20, 21, and 22; SC-3 No. 29; and SC-1s Nos. 32, 33, 34, and 35) and No. 22 was subsequently placed into service with Nos. 19 and 23. The three SC-4s were initially assigned to pull freight and work trains to refurbish the line, which involved vegetation removal and tie replacements, and during the winter of 1963–1964, the M&HM briefly lent the SC-4s to the LS&I and the Soo Line to slush frozen ore. Tourist operations officially commenced in the summer of 1964 with 15,000 riders.

The M&HM's goal was to operate all of their ex-LS&I locomotives and to eventually construct the resort complex Zerbal envisioned, but the goals would never be met, due to disagreements between Zerbal and the other investors, and the M&HM lacking a marketing department, resulting in low ridership with limited advertising. The railroad's revenue logging trains were also unprofitable. In August 1966, the M&HM only ran one excursion for that year before they suspended operations, and Nos. 23, 22, and 19 were moved to a field with the rest of the railroad's locomotives.

The M&HM subsequently went through a multi-year hiatus while Zerbal had the railroad's management and finances reorganized. In 1972, the M&HM resumed their operations with shortened running dates and a GE 70-ton switcher, and while No. 23 was restored to operating condition the following year, No. 19 continued to remain in outdoor storage. On April 13, 1984, Zerbal died shortly before a tax deadline, and with his remaining finances going to his accounting clients, the M&HM was unable to proceed operations, despite attempts made by their workforces to remain open. The M&HM's operations permanently closed down by December, and all of the equipment was sold off at an auction on January 14, 1985, while the rails were subsequently ripped up.

=== Ownership changes and display ===
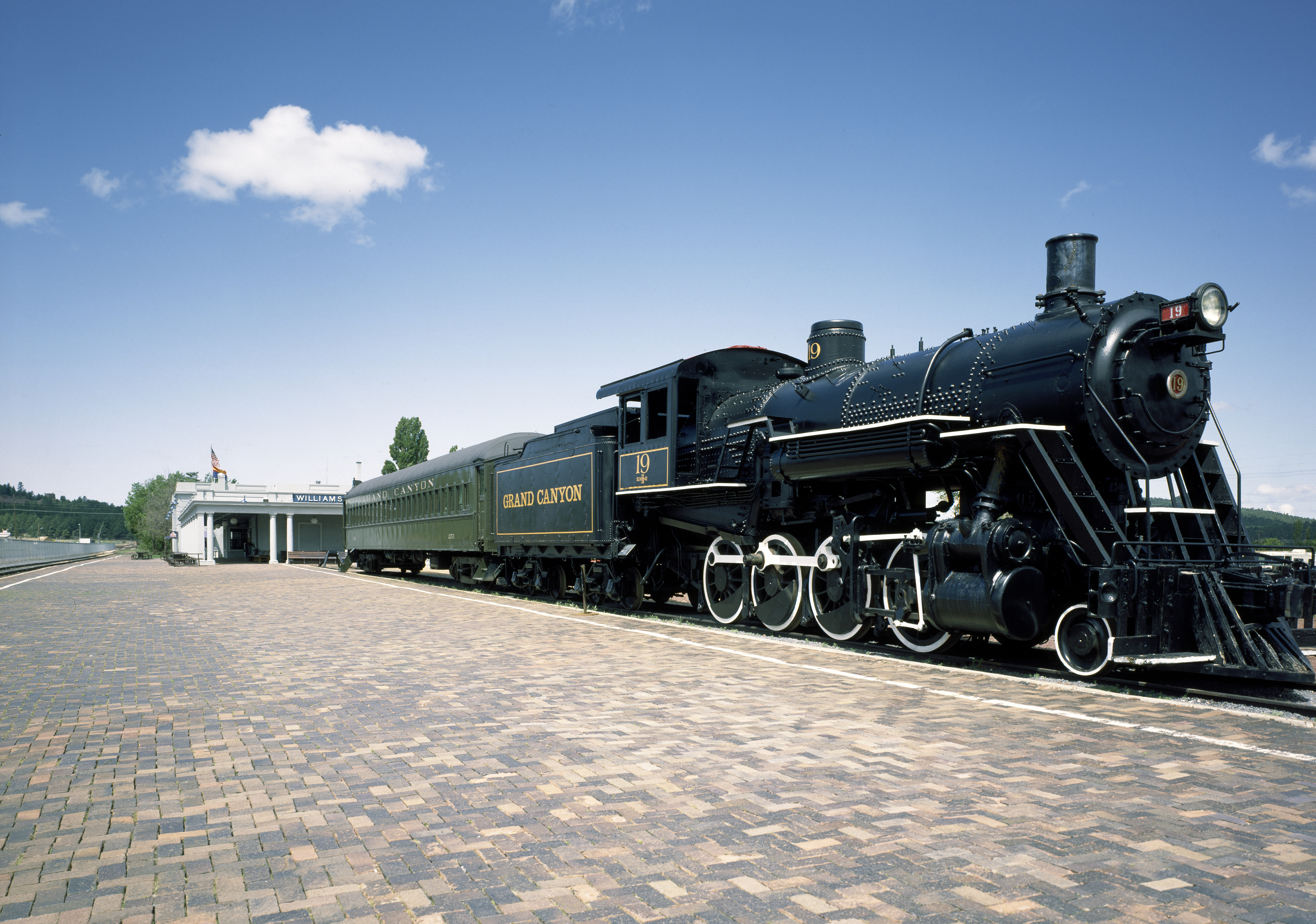
No. 19 cosmetically repainted and on static display at Williams Depot

During the auction, No. 19, along with Nos. 18, 20, and 21, were sold to a scrap dealer, the Ishpeming Steel Company, for $1,200 each, but ex-M&HM chief mechanical officer Art Anderson quickly signed a 90-day note of $10,000 to withhold the locomotives. Entrepreneur and fellow railfan John Slack agreed to help Anderson and acquired the four locomotives, and he subsequently decided to restore them for his own planned dinner train operations in Laona, Wisconsin. No. 18 was moved to Laona for restoration, while No. 19 and the other SC-4s remained in storage, but in 1987, Slack's dinner train plans fell through after his business lost a major contract and financial support.

In the late 1980s, under the guidance of Max and Thelma Biegert, the former Santa Fe Railroad line between Williams, Arizona, and the South Rim of the Grand Canyon was being redeveloped into a tourist operation called the Grand Canyon Railway (GCR). In July 1989, Slack agreed to sell to GCR Nos. 18, 19, and 20. The SC-4s were shipped on flatcars over the Chicago and North Western (C&NW) and Santa Fe mainlines to Williams, arriving on August 27. GCR completed the restoration of No. 18, which hauled the railroad's inaugural train on September 17.

GCR quickly realized that the SC-4s would be inadequate for the long passenger consists the railway expected to eventually handle, and they opted to restore the SC-3 No. 29 next, with plans to restore the more powerful CB&Q 2-8-2 No. 4960 and possibly another larger locomotive. GCR developed plans to restore Nos. 19 and 20 for use on a spur line near Tusayan to be built at the request of the National Park Service (NPS) to serve the Grand Canyon National Park Airport. For unknown reasons, the spur was never built, and Nos. 19 and 20 were deemed surplus for GCR's needs.

In 1991, Max Biegert proposed a deal to the city of Kingman, Arizona: he would donate No. 19 for display if the city would lease to him its locomotive, Santa Fe 4-8-4 No. 3759, which planned to restore for use in GCR's regular operations and in Orient Express-inspired operation between Williams and Los Angeles. Kingman officials declined.

In 1993, GCR reached an agreement with MGM Grand Inc. to sell No. 19, and it underwent a cosmetic restoration, and then it was briefly lined up and photographed in front of the Williams shops alongside Nos. 18, 29, and the cosmetically-repainted No. 20. No. 19 was subsequently shipped to Las Vegas, Nevada, for static display at the new MGM Grand Adventures theme park, and the locomotive was painted in GCR's livery to advertise the railway. In September 2000, MGM Grand closed the poorly attended theme park and began to sell off its rides and attractions.

On April 1, 2003, the Cañon City and Royal Gorge Railroad (CC&RG) of Cañon City, Colorado, announced their negotiations with MGM Grand—by then known as MGM Mirage—to acquire No. 19, and they planned to restore it by 2005 for tourist excursion service along the Royal Gorge. The CC&RG waited for No. 19 to be shipped while the MGM theme park was being dismantled, but for unknown reasons, their plans with the locomotive fell through.

In 2004, No. 19 was purchased by the city of Frisco, Texas, and it was shipped to their Frisco Heritage Center and put on static display with a St. Louis–San Francisco (Frisco) livery.

== See also ==
- Duluth and Northeastern 28
- Duluth and Northern Minnesota 14
- Chicago and North Western 175
- Copper Range 29

== Bibliography ==
- Durocher, Aurele (April 1958). "The Lake Superior and Ishpeming Railroad Company". The Railway and Locomotive Historical Society Bulletin (98): 13–31. JSTOR 43520202.
- Schauer, David (2015). Lake Superior & Ishpeming Railroad In Color. Vol. 1. Scotch Plains, New Jersey: Morning Sun Books, Inc. ISBN 978-1-58248-494-5.
- Richmond, Al (2017). The Story of Grand Canyon Railway: Cowboys, Miners, Presidents & Kings. Grand Canyon, Arizona: Grand Canyon Conservancy. ISBN 978-1-934656-91-4.
- Zahrt, Chris (May 2009). "Wandering No. 18's many lives". Trains. Vol. 69, no. 5. Kalmbach Media. pp. 45–51.
