= Lake Superior and Ishpeming 22 =

Preserved American 2-8-0 steam locomotive (LS&I class SC-4)

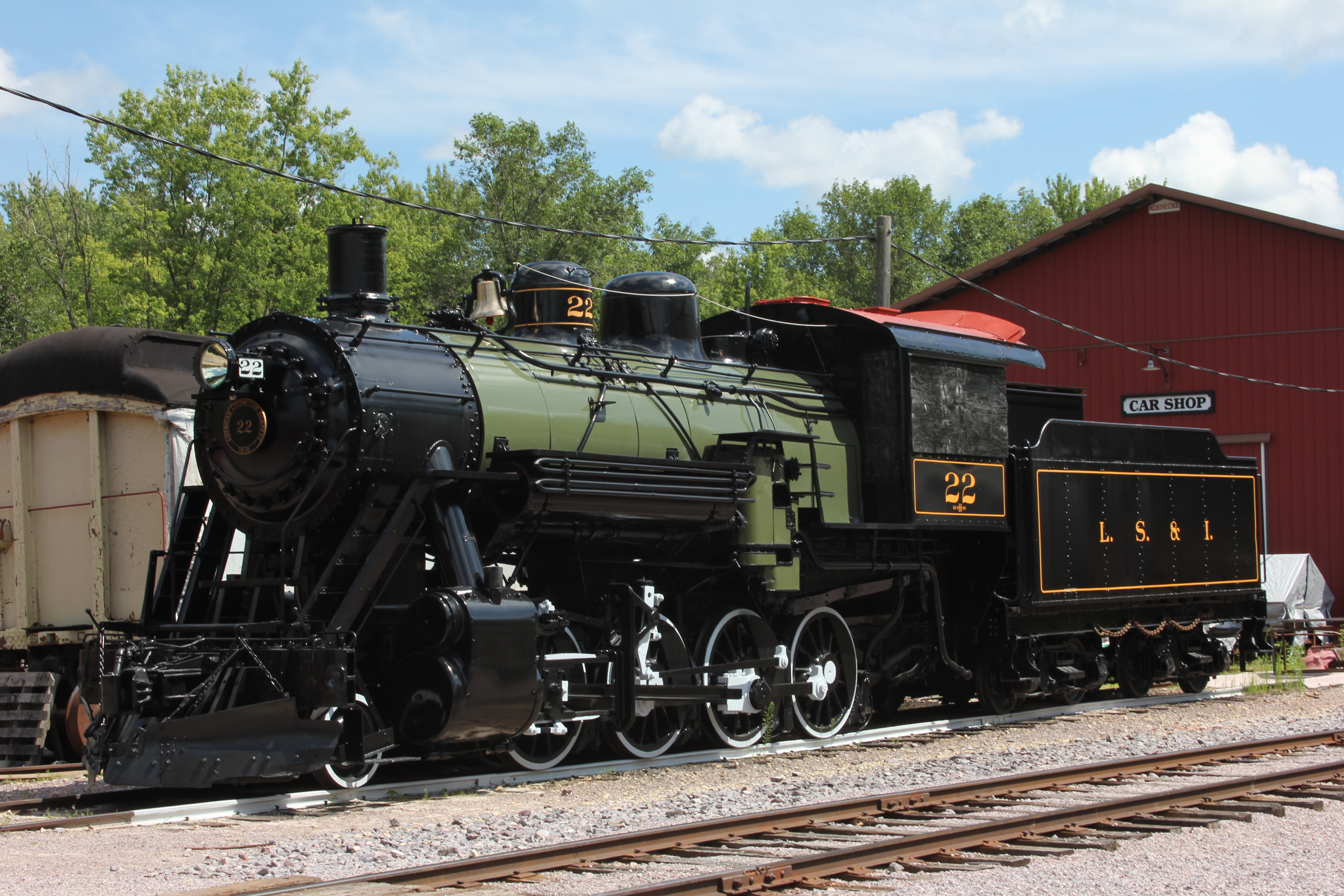
- No. 22 on display outside the Mid-Continent Railway Museum, July 16, 2016
Type and origin
- Power type: Steam
- Builder: American Locomotive Company (Pittsburg Works)
- Serial number: 46944
- Build date: January 1910
- Rebuilder: Lake Superior and Ishpeming Railroad
- Rebuild date: 1929
Specifications
- Configuration
  - Whyte: 2-8-0
  - UIC: 1'D'h
- Gauge: 4 ft 8 1/2 in (1,435 mm)
- Driver dia.: New: 48 in (1,200 mm); Now: 55 in (1,400 mm)
- Adhesive weight: 168,000 lb (76,000 kg)
- Loco weight: 189,360 lb (85,890 kg)
- Tender weight: 125,700 lb (57,000 kg)
- Total weight: 315,060 lb (142,910 kg)
- Fuel type: Coal
- Fuel capacity: 10.8 t (10.6 long tons; 11.9 short tons)
- Water cap.: 8,700 US gal (33,000 L; 7,200 imp gal)
- Boiler pressure: 200 psi (1,400 kPa)
- Cylinders: Two, outside
- Cylinder size: New: 20 in × 28 in (510 mm × 710 mm); Now: 22 in × 28 in (560 mm × 710 mm)
- Valve gear: New: Baker; Now: Walschaerts
- Valve type: Piston valves
- Loco brake: Air
- Train brakes: Air
- Couplers: Knuckle
Performance figures
- Tractive effort: 42,000 lbf (190,000 N)
Career
- Operators: Marquette and Southeastern Railway; Munising, Marquette and Southeastern Railway; Lake Superior and Ishpeming Railroad; Marquette and Huron Mountain Railroad
- Class: New: C-5; Now: SC-4
- Number in class: 6th of 8
- Numbers: M&SE 38; MM&SE 38; LS&I 22; M&HM 22
- Retired: September 1962 (revenue service); September 6, 1965 (excursion service)
- Restored: 1964 (excursion service); 2016 (cosmetically)
- Current owner: Buhrmaster family
- Disposition: On static display

Lake Superior and Ishpeming 22 is an SC-4 class 2-8-0 "Consolidation" type steam locomotive, built by the American Locomotive Company's (ALCO) Pittsburg Works in 1910 for the Marquette and Southeastern Railway as No. 38. It was renumbered to 22 in 1924, when the Marquette and Southeastern was anbsorbed into the Lake Superior and Ishpeming Railroad (LS&I). In 1963, it was purchased by the Marquette and Huron Mountain tourist railroad, who used it to pull their freight and excursion trains between Marquette and Big Bay until 1965.

After the M&HM was shut down in 1984, No. 22 was sold and moved to the Mid-Continent Railway Museum (MCRY) in North Freedom, Wisconsin, where it was disassembled for a restoration to operating condition, but new federal regulations were implemented and required for work to restart. In the 2010s, the project on No. 22 was revived and relegated as a cosmetic restoration, and the locomotive was reassembled, repainted, and put on display in 2016.

== History ==
=== Design and upgrades ===
In 1910, the Marquette and Southeastern Railway (M&SE), which operated logging and iron ore trains and connected the neighboring Munising Railway with the Lake Superior and Ishpeming (LS&I), ordered three 2-8-0 "Consolidations" from the American Locomotive Company's (ALCO) Pittsburg Works, at a price of $14,335 each. (Note: The location was known as Pittsburg at the time these locomotives were built from 1891 till 1911.) The three 2-8-0s (Nos. 38–40) were duplicates of the LS&I's C-5 class (Nos. 9–13), and they were all initially designed with outside Pilliod valve gear, 20-by-28-inch (510 mm × 710 mm) cylinders, and 48-inch (1,200 mm) diameter driving wheels, and they were rated at a tractive effort of around 34,000 pounds-force (150 kN).

Nos. 38–40 were also built with saturated keyhole fireboxes that were placed in between their rear sets of driving wheels, resulting in their poor abilities to produce steam. In 1911, the M&SE merged with the Munising Railway to form the Munising, Marquette and Southeastern Railway (MM&SE). In 1924, the MM&SE merged into the LS&I, and the latter reorganized their expanded operations and renumbered all locomotives retained. MM&SE Nos. 38–40 were grouped with LS&I C-5s Nos. 9–13, and they were collectively renumbered as Nos. 18–25.

LS&I C-5 class numbers and details
Pre-1924 Nos.	Post-1924 Nos.	ALCO serial numbers	Notes
LS&I 9	LS&I 23	46939	Rebuilt into an SC-4 in 1928. Preserved.
LS&I 10	LS&I 25	46940	Remained as a C-5. Scrapped in 1956.
LS&I 11	LS&I 18	46941	Rebuilt into an SC-4 in 1930. Preserved.
LS&I 12	LS&I 19	46942	Rebuilt into an SC-4 in 1934. Preserved.
LS&I 13	LS&I 20	46943	Rebuilt into an SC-4 in 1929. Preserved.
MM&SE 38	LS&I 22	46944	Rebuilt into an SC-4 in 1929. Preserved.
MM&SE 39	LS&I 21	46945	Rebuilt into an SC-4 in 1930. Preserved.
MM&SE 40	LS&I 24	46946	Rebuilt into an SC-4 in 1930. Preserved.

From 1928 to 1934, almost all the C-5 locomotives, with the sole exception of No. 25, were sent to the LS&I's Presque Isle locomotive shops to be extensively rebuilt and modified to improve their performances. Their cylinder saddles were replaced by ones with superheated cylinders and piston valves; their boilers received superheaters and were raised higher above the frame; their fireboxes were widened and received Nicholson thermic siphons; and feedwater heaters were installed. The upgrades raised the C-5s' tractive effort to around 42,000 pounds-force (187 kN), and they were reclassified as SC-4s.

=== Revenue service ===
No. 22 was originally numbered 38, as it was the first of the M&SE's group of three 2-8-0s delivered from ALCO. The M&SE used Nos. 38–40, along with Baldwin-built 2-8-0s Nos. 36–37, as their primary locomotives, being assigned to all services the railway provided: passenger service, mixed freight service, iron ore service, and mine-switching service. No. 38's road number remained unchanged following the M&SE's merger into the MM&SE in 1911, but after the MM&SE was absorbed into the LS&I in 1924, No. 38 was renumbered to 22, and Nos. 39 and 40 became Nos. 21 and 24, respectively.

In 1929, No. 22 was sent to the LS&I's Presque Isle shops and rebuilt as an SC-4. The locomotive was subsequently reassigned to switch hopper cars and to pull varying trains on branch lines. Throughout the 1950s, the LS&I slowly dieselized their locomotive roster, but all the SC-4s remained in service after the railroad's other steam locomotive classes were retired, since they were favored by crews, their boilers were used to thaw frozen iron ore, and the LS&I routinely closed their iron ore operations during winter months. The year 1962 was the final year the aging SC-4s operated for the LS&I before the railroad discontinued their steam operations in September.

=== Marquette and Huron Mountain Railroad ===
By August 1963, No. 22, along with ten other LS&I 2-8-0s, were acquired by the Marquette and Huron Mountain Railroad (M&HM), a shortline operation founded by public accountant John A. Zerbal. The M&HM also obtained the LS&I's abandoned Big Bay branch between Marquette and Big Bay, and their goal was to operate all of their locomotives for shortline freight and tourist excursion operations and to eventually construct a major complex of resort attractions in Big Bay. In early 1964, No. 22 was placed into service on the M&HM, joining fellow SC-4s Nos. 23 and 19, and they were initially used to pull freight and work trains to refurbish the right-of-way before passenger operations commenced in the summer of that year. During that time, No. 22 was equipped with a pilot plow for snow clearances during winter months, and the M&HM reportedly lent their SC-4s to the LS&I and the Soo Line for frozen ore-thawing.

No. 22 last operated for the M&HM on September 6, 1965, before the M&HM suspended operations the following year, and Nos. 22, 23, and 19 were left in a field with the rest of the railroad's locomotives. The M&HM was unable to achieve their goals, due to low profitability from revenue freight runs and low passenger ridership, and the railroad went through a multi-year hiatus while Zerbal had the railroad's management issues reorganized. The M&HM resumed their operations in 1972 with shortened running schedules, and while No. 23 was subsequently restored to operating condition, Nos. 22 and 19 continued to remain in storage. On April 13, 1984, Zerbal died shortly before a tax deadline, and following some failed attempts to continue the M&HM's operations, the railroad permanently ceased by the end of the year. All of the equipment was sold off at an auction on January 14, 1985.

=== Mid-Continent Railway Museum ===
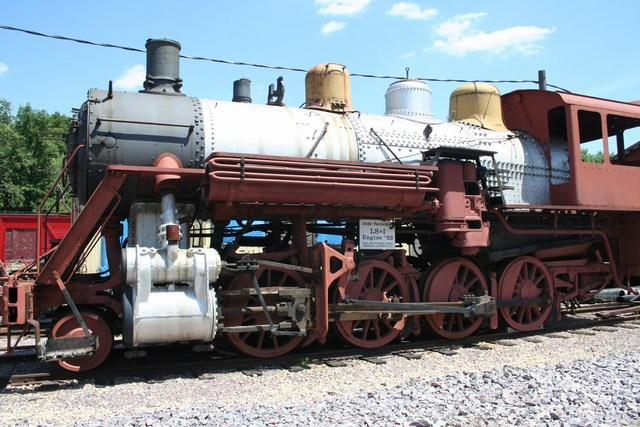
No. 22 partially disassembled from its unfinished restoration, December 2008

During the auction, No. 22 was sold to father and son duo Ray and William Buhrmaster, two members of the Mid-Continent Railway Museum (MCRY), and the locomotive was moved along with LS&I SC-3 No. 29 to the museum's location in North Freedom, Wisconsin. No. 22 was subsequently evaluated to potentially be restored to operation, and in 1992, the locomotive was disassembled as work began. Within the ensuing years, restoration work was nearly completed, just as the Federal Railroad Administration (FRA) implemented new safety standards for steam operations, and No. 22's then-condition did not comply. The Buhrmasters were unwilling to restart the work they had just performed, and for the next several years, No. 22 remained in outdoor storage in a partially disassembled state, and the MCRY's members were committed to rebuilding other steam locomotives, such as Polson Logging Co. 2.

In 2014, coinciding with the MCRY's plans to construct a coach shed to display a portion of their rolling stock, it was decided that No. 22 would be reassembled for a cosmetic restoration, and Diversified Rail Services, a contracting firm owned by Gary Bensman, was hired to lead the project. The project involved the pilot plow being refurbished and reinstalled, the wooden interior of the cab being replaced, new boiler jacketing being fabricated, and thorough research for the tone of green paint for the boiler jacketing, and in 2016, reassembly and repainting work was completed on the SC-4. On September 16, 2019, No. 22 was moved inside the MCRY's newly built coach shed No. 2, also known as the Laurence Dorcy Building, since the majority of the construction's funding was gifted by Laurence Dorcy, the great-grandson of James J. Hill. On September 23, the building was opened as an exhibit hall, and No. 22 was formally displayed inside.

== See also ==
- Lake Superior and Ishpeming 33
- Western Maryland Scenic Railroad 734
- Arcade and Attica 18
- New Hope Railroad 40
- Chicago and North Western 175

== Bibliography ==
- Durocher, Aurele (April 1958). "The Lake Superior and Ishpeming Railroad Company". The Railway and Locomotive Historical Society Bulletin (98): 13–31. JSTOR 43520202.
- Schauer, David (2015). Lake Superior & Ishpeming Railroad In Color. Vol. 1. Scotch Plains, New Jersey: Morning Sun Books, Inc. ISBN 978-1-58248-494-5.
- Zahrt, Chris (May 2009). "Wandering No. 18's many lives". Trains. Vol. 69, no. 5. Kalmbach Media. pp. 45–51.
