= Lake Superior and Ishpeming 21 =

Preserved American 2-8-0 steam locomotive (LS&I class SC-4)

Type and origin
- Power type: Steam
- Builder: American Locomotive Company (Pittsburg Works)
- Serial number: 46945
- Build date: January 1910
- Rebuilder: Lake Superior and Ishpeming Railroad
- Rebuild date: 1930
Specifications
- Configuration
  - Whyte: 2-8-0
  - UIC: 1'D'h
- Gauge: 4 ft 8 1/2 in (1,435 mm)
- Driver dia.: New: 48 in (1,200 mm); Now: 55 in (1,400 mm)
- Adhesive weight: 168,000 lb (76,000 kg)
- Loco weight: 189,360 lb (85,890 kg)
- Tender weight: 125,700 lb (57,000 kg)
- Total weight: 315,060 lb (142,910 kg)
- Fuel type: Coal
- Fuel capacity: 10.8 t (10.6 long tons; 11.9 short tons)
- Water cap.: 8,700 US gal (33,000 L; 7,200 imp gal)
- Boiler pressure: 200 psi (1,400 kPa)
- Cylinders: Two, outside
- Cylinder size: New: 20 in × 28 in (510 mm × 710 mm); Now: 22 in × 28 in (560 mm × 710 mm)
- Valve gear: New: Baker; Now: Walschaerts
- Valve type: Piston valves
- Loco brake: Air
- Train brakes: Air
- Couplers: Knuckle
Performance figures
- Tractive effort: 42,000 lbf (190,000 N)
Career
- Operators: Marquette and Southeastern Railway; Munising, Marquette and Southeastern Railway; Lake Superior and Ishpeming Railroad
- Class: New: C-5; Now: SC-4
- Number in class: 7th of 8
- Numbers: M&SE 39; MM&SE 39; LS&I 21
- Retired: September 1962
- Current owner: Michael Goodell
- Disposition: Undergoing slow restoration to operating condition

Lake Superior and Ishpeming 21 is an SC-4 class 2-8-0 "Consolidation" type steam locomotive, built by the American Locomotive Company's (ALCO) Pittsburg Works in 1910 for the Marquette and Southeastern Railway as No. 39. It was renumbered to 21 in 1924, when the Marquette and Southeastern was anbsorbed into the Lake Superior and Ishpeming Railroad (LS&I). In 1963, it was purchased by the Marquette and Huron Mountain tourist railroad, who planned to used it to pull their freight and excursion trains between Marquette and Big Bay.

After the M&HM was shut down in 1984, No. 21 sat in storage at the abandoned Marquette and Huron Mountain tourist railroad location for two decades until it was purchased by private owner Michael Goodell in 2003 and moved it to Augusta, WI, for restoration.

== History ==
=== Design and upgrades ===
In 1910, the Marquette and Southeastern Railway (M&SE), which operated logging and iron ore trains and connected the neighboring Munising Railway with the Lake Superior and Ishpeming (LS&I), ordered three 2-8-0 "Consolidations" from the American Locomotive Company's (ALCO) Pittsburg Works, at a price of $14,335 each. (Note: The location was known as Pittsburg at the time these locomotives were built from 1891 till 1911.) The three 2-8-0s (Nos. 38–40) were duplicates of the LS&I's C-5 class (Nos. 9–13), and they were all initially designed with outside Pilliod valve gear, 20-by-28-inch (510 mm × 710 mm) cylinders, and 48-inch (1,200 mm) diameter driving wheels, and they were rated at a tractive effort of around 34,000 pounds-force (150 kN).

Nos. 38–40 were also built with saturated keyhole fireboxes that were placed in between their rear sets of driving wheels, resulting in their poor abilities to produce steam. In 1911, the M&SE merged with the Munising Railway to form the Munising, Marquette and Southeastern Railway (MM&SE). In 1924, the MM&SE merged into the LS&I, and the latter reorganized their expanded operations and renumbered all locomotives retained. MM&SE Nos. 38–40 were grouped with LS&I C-5s Nos. 9–13, and they were collectively renumbered as Nos. 18–25.

LS&I C-5 class numbers and details
Pre-1924 Nos.	Post-1924 Nos.	ALCO serial numbers	Notes
LS&I 9	LS&I 23	46939	Rebuilt into an SC-4 in 1928. Preserved.
LS&I 10	LS&I 25	46940	Remained as a C-5. Scrapped in 1956.
LS&I 11	LS&I 18	46941	Rebuilt into an SC-4 in 1930. Preserved.
LS&I 12	LS&I 19	46942	Rebuilt into an SC-4 in 1934. Preserved.
LS&I 13	LS&I 20	46943	Rebuilt into an SC-4 in 1929. Preserved.
MM&SE 38	LS&I 22	46944	Rebuilt into an SC-4 in 1929. Preserved.
MM&SE 39	LS&I 21	46945	Rebuilt into an SC-4 in 1930. Preserved.
MM&SE 40	LS&I 24	46946	Rebuilt into an SC-4 in 1930. Preserved.

From 1928 to 1934, almost all the C-5 locomotives, with the sole exception of No. 25, were sent to the LS&I's Presque Isle locomotive shops to be extensively rebuilt and modified to improve their performances. Their cylinder saddles were replaced by ones with superheated cylinders and piston valves; their boilers received superheaters and were raised higher above the frame; their fireboxes were widened and received Nicholson thermic siphons; and feedwater heaters were installed. The upgrades raised the C-5s' tractive effort to around 42,000 pounds-force (187 kN), and they were reclassified as SC-4s.

=== Revenue service ===
No. 21 was originally numbered 39, as it was one of the M&SE's group of three 2-8-0s delivered from ALCO. The M&SE used Nos. 38–40, along with Baldwin-built 2-8-0s Nos. 36–37, as their primary locomotives, being assigned to all services the railway provided: passenger service, mixed freight service, iron ore service, and mine-switching service. No. 38's road number remained unchanged following the M&SE's merger into the MM&SE in 1911, but after the MM&SE was absorbed into the LS&I in 1924, No. 39 was renumbered to 21, and Nos. 38 and 40 became Nos. 22 and 24, respectively.

In 1930, No. 21 was sent to the LS&I's Presque Isle shops and rebuilt as an SC-4. The locomotive was subsequently reassigned to switch hopper cars and to pull varying trains on branch lines. Throughout the 1950s, the LS&I slowly dieselized their locomotive roster, but all the SC-4s remained in service after the railroad's other steam locomotive classes were retired, since they were favored by crews, their boilers were used to thaw frozen iron ore, and the LS&I routinely closed their iron ore operations during winter months. In September 1962, the aging SC-4s operated for the LS&I for the last time, the railroad eventually discontinued their steam operations and replaced them with diesels.

=== First retirement and storage ===
By August 1963, No. 21, along with ten other LS&I 2-8-0s, were acquired by the Marquette and Huron Mountain Railroad (M&HM), a shortline operation founded by public accountant John A. Zerbal. The M&HM also obtained the LS&I's abandoned Big Bay branch between Marquette and Big Bay, and their goal was to operate all of their locomotives for shortline freight and tourist excursion operations and to eventually construct a major complex of resort attractions in Big Bay. Only three of the other SC-4s (Nos. 19, 22 and 23) were placed into service on the M&HM, while No. 21 was left in dead storage at a field with the rest of the railroad's locomotives.

The locomotives were joined in storage by Nos. 19 and 22 in 1967, when the M&HM suspended operations for reorganization, and then they resumed in 1972 with only No. 23 returning to service. In April 13, 1984, Zerbal died shortly before a tax deadline, and following some failed attempts to continue the M&HM's operations, the railroad permanently ceased by the end of the year, and the line was later ripped up. All their remaining locomotives were auctioned off on January 14, 1985, and No. 21, along with Nos. 19, 18, and 20, were sold for scrap to the Ishpeming Steel Company. Art Anderson, the former M&HM chief mechanical officer, signed a 90-note of $10,000 to withhold the SC-4s from scrapping, and then they were acquired by a Wisconsin-based entrepreneur and fellow railfan, John Slack.

Slack desired to restore the four locomotives to haul dinner trains in Laona, Wisconsin, and while No. 18 was moved for restoration, the plans never materialized, due to losses of financial support. In 1989, almost all of Slack's SC-4s were sold to the Grand Canyon Railway (GCR) and moved to Williams, Arizona, but No. 21 was the exception, as it remained under Slack's ownership and was left in dead storage in Marquette. It became the final LS&I steam locomotive to remain on LS&I property.

In 2003, No. 21 was acquired by railfan and real estate developer Michael Goodell, who had it moved to the Mid-West Locomotive & Machine Works in North Lake, Wisconsin, and disassembled for restoration to operating condition.

== See also ==
- Lake Superior and Ishpeming 18
- Lake Superior and Ishpeming 22
- Lake Superior and Ishpeming 23
- Lake Superior and Ishpeming 24
- Arcade and Attica 18
- New Hope Railroad 40
- Chicago and North Western 175

== Bibliography ==
- Durocher, Aurele (April 1958). "The Lake Superior and Ishpeming Railroad Company". The Railway and Locomotive Historical Society Bulletin (98): 13–31. JSTOR 43520202.
- Schauer, David (2015). Lake Superior & Ishpeming Railroad In Color. Vol. 1. Scotch Plains, New Jersey: Morning Sun Books, Inc. ISBN 978-1-58248-494-5.
- Zahrt, Chris (May 2009). "Wandering No. 18's many lives". Trains. Vol. 69, no. 5. Kalmbach Media. pp. 45–51.
