= Lake Superior and Ishpeming 23 =

Preserved American 2-8-0 steam locomotive (LS&I class SC-4)

Type and origin
- Power type: Steam
- Builder: American Locomotive Company (Pittsburg Works)
- Serial number: 46939
- Build date: January 1910
- Rebuilder: Lake Superior and Ishpeming Railroad
- Rebuild date: 1928
Specifications
- Configuration
  - Whyte: 2-8-0
  - UIC: 1'D'h
- Gauge: 4 ft 8 1/2 in (1,435 mm)
- Driver dia.: New: 48 in (1,200 mm); Now: 55 in (1,400 mm)
- Adhesive weight: 168,000 lb (76,000 kg)
- Loco weight: 189,360 lb (85,890 kg)
- Tender weight: 125,700 lb (57,000 kg)
- Total weight: 315,060 lb (142,910 kg)
- Fuel type: Coal
- Fuel capacity: 10.8 t (10.6 long tons; 11.9 short tons)
- Water cap.: 8,700 US gal (33,000 L; 7,200 imp gal)
- Boiler pressure: 200 psi (1,400 kPa)
- Cylinders: Two, outside
- Cylinder size: New: 20 in × 28 in (510 mm × 710 mm); Now: 22 in × 28 in (560 mm × 710 mm)
- Valve gear: New: Baker; Now: Walschaerts
- Valve type: Piston valves
- Loco brake: Air
- Train brakes: Air
- Couplers: Knuckle
Performance figures
- Tractive effort: 42,000 lbf (190,000 N)
Career
- Operators: Lake Superior and Ishpeming Railroad; Marquette and Huron Mountain Railroad
- Class: New: C-5; Now: SC-4
- Number in class: 1st of 8
- Numbers: LS&I 9; LS&I 23; M&HM 23
- Retired: September 1962 (revenue service); August 1966 (1st excursion service); December 1984 (2nd excursion service)
- Restored: July 2, 1963 (1st excursion service); 1973 (2nd excursion service)
- Current owner: Empire State Railway Museum
- Disposition: Undergoing cosmetic restoration

Lake Superior and Ishpeming 23 is a SC-4 class 2-8-0 "Consolidation" type steam locomotive, built by the American Locomotive Company's (ALCO) Pittsburg Works in January 1910 for the Lake Superior and Ishpeming Railroad (LS&I) in Upper Michigan. The locomotive was originally numbered as No. 9, but it was renumbered to No. 23 in 1924. It was used for pulling carloads of iron ore, as well as some passenger trains on branch lines, until 1962. By the end of that year, it was purchased by the Marquette and Huron Mountain tourist railroad, who used it to pull their excursion trains between Marquette and Big Bay.

After the M&HM was shut down in 1984, No. 23 was sold to the Empire State Railway Museum in Phoenicia, New York, where it was put on static display. In 1998, ESRM announced that they would restore the locomotive to operating condition and they began the rebuilding process at the Catskill Mountain Railroad's (CMRR) Kingston yard facility. By the end of the 2010s, after the ESRM became isolated from the CMRR by a portion of the railroad's line being converted into a trail, attendance at the ESRM plummeted, and the project on No. 23 was relegated to a cosmetic restoration. As of 2026, No. 23's cosmetic restoration is still underway at the ESRM's location in Phoenicia.

== History ==
=== Design and upgrades ===
In 1909, the Lake Superior and Ishpeming Railroad (LS&I) authorized to sell off four of their older steam locomotives and replace them with new 2-8-0 locomotives. The following year, five new C-5 class 2-8-0s (Nos. 9–13) were constructed for the LS&I by the American Locomotive Company's (ALCO) Pittsburg Works, at a cost of $14,335 each, and construction was supervised by superintendent Walter Chrysler. (Note: The location was known as Pittsburg at the time these locomotives were built from 1891 till 1911.) The C-5s were initially designed with outside Pilliod valve gear, 48-inch (1,200 mm) diameter driving wheels, and 20-by-28-inch (510 mm × 710 mm) cylinders, and they were rated at around 34,000 pounds-force (150 kN) of tractive effort.

The C-5s were also found to be underpowered, since they were built with saturated keyhole fireboxes that were placed in between their rear sets of driving wheels, resulting in their poor abilities to produce steam. In 1924, the LS&I was reincorporated after merging with the Munising, Marquette and Southeastern Railway (MM&SE), and the former retainted the latter's fleet of three C-5s, expanding the class total to eight. With almost all locomotives on the LS&I's expanded roster being renumbered, the C-5s were renumbered as 18–25.

LS&I C-5 class numbers and details
Pre-1924 Nos.	Post-1924 Nos.	ALCO serial numbers	Notes
LS&I 9	LS&I 23	46939	Rebuilt into an SC-4 in 1928. Preserved.
LS&I 10	LS&I 25	46940	Remained as a C-5. Scrapped in 1956.
LS&I 11	LS&I 18	46941	Rebuilt into an SC-4 in 1930. Preserved.
LS&I 12	LS&I 19	46942	Rebuilt into an SC-4 in 1934. Preserved.
LS&I 13	LS&I 20	46943	Rebuilt into an SC-4 in 1929. Preserved.
MM&SE 38	LS&I 22	46944	Rebuilt into an SC-4 in 1929. Preserved.
MM&SE 39	LS&I 21	46945	Rebuilt into an SC-4 in 1930. Preserved.
MM&SE 40	LS&I 24	46946	Rebuilt into an SC-4 in 1930. Preserved.

Between 1928 and 1934, almost all the C-5 class locomotives, with the sole exception of No. 25, were sent to the LS&I's Presque Isle locomotive shops to be extensively rebuilt and modified to improve their performance. Their cylinder saddles were replaced by ones with superheated cylinders and piston valves; their boilers received superheaters and were raised higher above the frame; their fireboxes were widened and received Nicholson thermic siphons; and feedwater heaters were installed. The rebuilt C-5s were reclassified as SC-4s, and their tractive effort was raised to around 42,000 pounds (19 tonnes). Their overall reliability was also significantly improved, and they became favored by LS&I crews.

=== Revenue service ===
No. 23 was the very first C-5 class locomotive to be built, and it was originally numbered 9. No. 9 was primarily assigned in its early years to pull the LS&I's mixed freight trains, and it was occasionally used to pull iron ore trains. As a saturated locomotive, No. 9 was prone to stalling whenever the locomotive would climb a grade, or when the weight of its train exceeded its pulling power. On one occasion, the C-5 participated in a locomotive "tug of war" publicity session, but it lost to B-4 class 2-8-0 No. 8. Following the LS&I's merger with the MM&SE in 1924, No. 9 was renumbered to 23.

In 1928, No. 23 became the first of seven C-5 locomotives to be rebuilt and modified as SC-4s at the LS&I's Presque Isle shops. Following its rebuild, the locomotive was primarily reassigned to switch hopper cars at iron ore mines and to pull freight and logging trains on branch lines. Throughout the 1950s, the LS&I gradually dieselized their roster, but all seven of the SC-4s, due to their reliability, remained on the roster after the railroad retired their other steam locomotive classes, being used as switchers and to thaw frozen iron ore. The aging SC-4s were retired in September 1962, when the railroad discontinued their commercial steam operations.

=== Marquette and Huron Mountain Railroad ===
In December 1958, the LS&I petitioned to abandon their 23.74-mile (38.21 km) Big Bay Branch between Marquette and Big Bay, since it had no customers left—having no trains run since November 1957—but Certified Public Accountant (CPA) John A. Zerbal entered negotiations to purchase the line. Since Zerbal and his father had previously served the LS&I, and with Marquette County averaging 700,000 visitors per year at the time, Zerbal saw potential in converting the branch into a tourist railroad, and he decided to plan on developing a major resort complex of outdoor activities in Big Bay which he dubbed "Superiorland", taking inspiration from Disneyland and its tourist trains.

He established the for-profit Marquette and Huron Mountain Railroad (M&HM) and gathered support from fellow investors, one of whom envisioned Big Bay as Upper Michigan's alternative to Aspen, Colorado. Zerbal also opted to utilize former LS&I equipment for the line, and the M&HM purchased No. 23, along with fellow SC-4 No. 19, in December 1962 at a cost of $11,000: $5,000 for their scrap value and $6,000 for having them overhauled. On July 2, 1963, the Interstate Commerce Commission (ICC) approved the sale of the Big Bay Branch, and No. 23 subsequently pulled the M&HM's first trains. By August, the railroad acquired the rest of the remaining steam locomotives the LS&I owned (SC-4s Nos. 18, 20, 21, and 22; SC-3 No. 29; and SC-1s Nos. 32, 33, 34, and 35) and No. 22 was subsequently placed into service on the M&HM alongside Nos. 19 and 23.

Initially, the three SC-4s pulled freight and work trains to refurbish the line, which involved vegetation removal and tie replacements, and then tourist operations officially commenced in the summer of 1964 with 15,000 riders. The M&HM's goal was to operate all of their ex-LS&I locomotives and to eventually construct the resort complex Zerbal envisioned. The goals would never be met, since Zerbal's consensus with the other investors was unstable, and the M&HM lacked a marketing department, resulting in declining ridership with limited advertising. The railroad's revenue pulpwood and logging trains were also not profitable enough. In August 1966, the M&HM only ran one excursion for that year before they suspended operations, and Nos. 23, 22, and 19 were moved to a field with the rest of the railroad's locomotives.

The M&HM subsequently went through a multi-year hiatus while Zerbal had the railroad's management reorganized, and almost all the SC-1s, which were too heavy for the line, were gradually sold off to help recoup lost revenue. In 1972, the M&HM resumed their operations with shortened running dates and a GE 70-ton switcher, and the following year, No. 23 was restored to operating condition, with the help of retired LS&I employees. The M&HM also shortened their operations from 23 miles (37 kilometres) to 8 miles (13 kilometres), since Zerbal was convinced that tourists would not enjoy riding on a long-distance tourist train. Within the ensuing years, workforces from the Chicago and North Western (C&NW) and the Soo Line also began helping the M&HM, and No. 23 was allowed to undergo heavy maintenance at a Soo Line roundhouse during winter months.

While the M&HM still struggled to turn profits, their passenger ridership gradually increased as tourists found more leisure during their visits around Marquette, and their ridership peaked in 1983. On July 9 of the same year, No. 23 hauled an excursion over the LS&I between Marquette and Ishpeming for the Upper Peninsula Short Lines Model Railroaders Club. On April 13, 1984, Zerbal died shortly before a tax deadline, and his remaining finances went to his accounting clients. Many of the M&HM's workforces, including chief mechanical officer Art Anderson, tried to save the railroad by continuing operations on their own, and then they attempted to sell it for $250,000, but no buyers showed interest. The M&HM's operations permanently closed down by December, all of the equipment was sold off at an auction on January 14, 1985, and the rails were subsequently ripped up, while the Big Bay depot was repurposed as a lodge.

=== Empire State Railway Museum ===
During the auction, No. 23 was purchased by the Empire State Railway Museum (ESRM) at a bid of $10,000. The ESRM moved No. 23 to their location in Phoenicia, New York, where it received a partial cosmetic restoration and was put on static display near a Phoenicia depot that served the Catskill Mountain Railroad (CMRR), which leased the former New York Central (NYC) Ulster and Delaware line (U&D) from Ulster County to operate their own tourist trains. In February 1998, the ESRM announced that they would partner with the CMRR to restore No. 23 to operating condition for use as the centerpiece of their operations. The locomotive was moved to the CMRR's Cornell Street facility in Kingston for disassembly. Ultrasound testing was completed with good results, and repairs for the boiler and tubes began. The tender was also completely rebuilt.

The project was estimated to be completed by 2010 for the 100th anniversary of No. 23's construction date, but as the CMRR had other priorities, the goal was never met. In 2011, infrastructure for both the ESRM and the CMRR sustained damage by Hurricane Irene, and then in 2014, as the latter struggled to repair the right-of-way, Ulster County began attempts to terminate their lease, as they were dissatisfied with the railroad's tourism efforts. By early 2016, amidst a series of lease disputes with Ulster County, the CMRR was ordered to vacate their Cornell Street facility. No. 23 had to be moved back to the ESRM's location in Phoenicia, and it had to be transported in sections via truck, since the former U&D line was split in half by the hurricane.

The museum subsequently constructed a two-stall car barn to store the locomotive indoors. The ESRM became isolated from the CMRR's operations, since Ulster County decided against renewing the railroad's lease of the middle portion of the U&D line and decided to convert it into a recreational trail, leading to the creation of the Ashokan Rail Trail. Despite some trackage out of Phoenicia being repaired, attendance at the ESRM consequently plummeted, and the project on No. 23 was relegated to a cosmetic restoration. As of 2026, the SC-4's restoration is still ongoing with limited volunteers.

== See also ==
- Arcade and Attica 18
- Copper Range 29
- Chicago and North Western 175
- Chicago and North Western 1385
- New Hope Railroad 40

== Bibliography ==
- Durocher, Aurele (April 1958). "The Lake Superior and Ishpeming Railroad Company". The Railway and Locomotive Historical Society Bulletin (98): 13–31. JSTOR 43520202.
- Schauer, David (2015). Lake Superior & Ishpeming Railroad In Color. Vol. 1. Scotch Plains, New Jersey: Morning Sun Books, Inc. ISBN 978-1-58248-494-5.
- Zahrt, Chris (May 2009). "Wandering No. 18's many lives". Trains. Vol. 69, no. 5. Kalmbach Media. pp. 45–51.
