= Lake Superior and Ishpeming 33 =

Preserved American 2-8-0 locomotive (LS&I class SC-1)

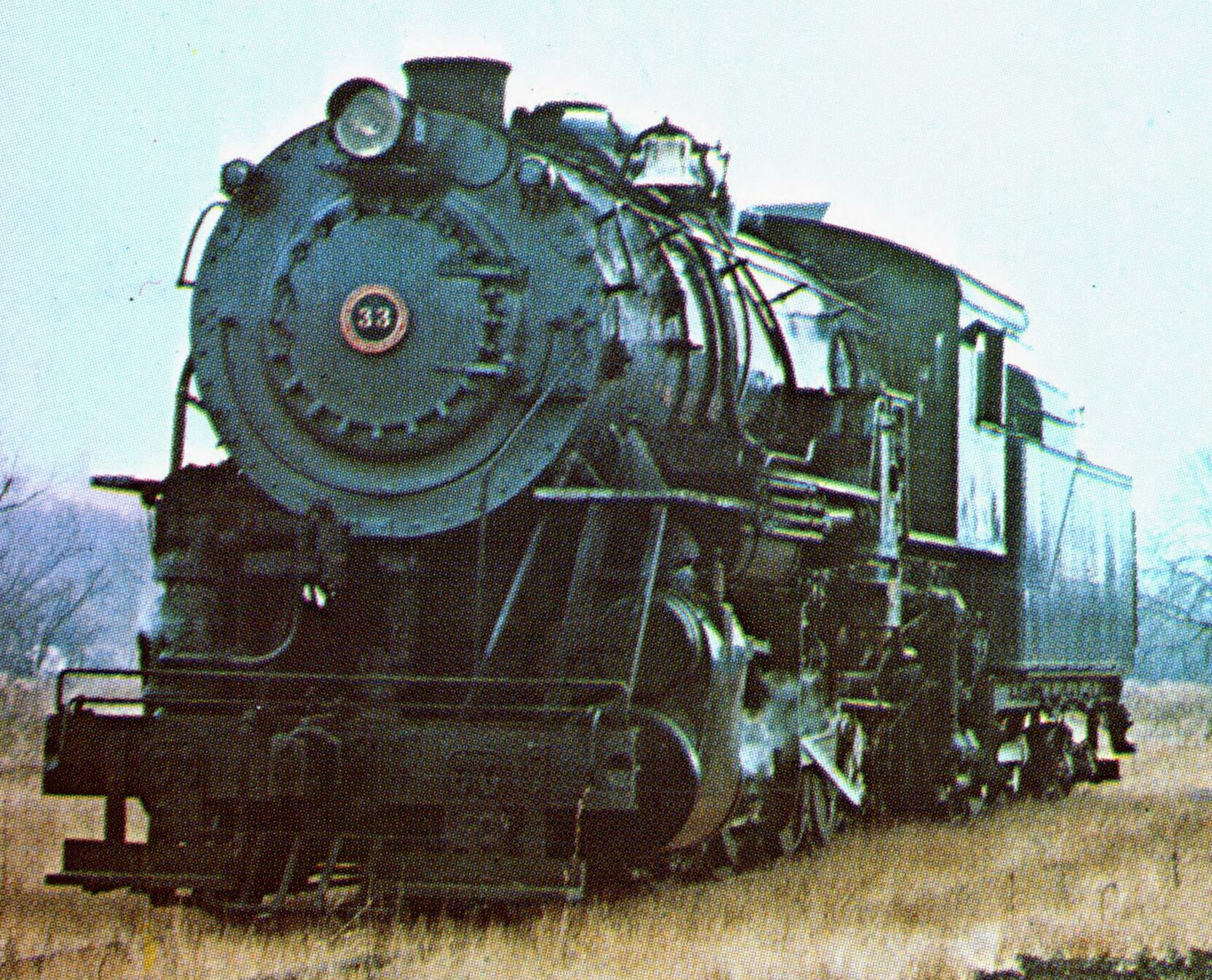
- No. 33 on the Hocking Valley Scenic Railway
Type and origin
- Power type: Steam
- Builder: Baldwin Locomotive Works
- Serial number: 43108
- Build date: April 1916
Specifications
- Configuration
  - Whyte: 2-8-0
  - UIC: 1'D'h
- Gauge: 4 ft 8 1/2 in (1,435 mm)
- Driver dia.: 50 in (1,270 mm)
- Wheelbase: 60.96 ft (18.58 m)
  - Engine: 26 ft (7.9 m)
  - Drivers: 16 ft (4.9 m)
- Adhesive weight: 238,000 lb (108,000 kg)
- Loco weight: 268,000 lb (122,000 kg)
- Tender weight: 167,000 lb (76,000 kg)
- Total weight: 435,000 lb (197,000 kg)
- Fuel type: Coal
- Fuel capacity: 12 t (12 long tons; 13 short tons)
- Water cap.: 9,500 US gal (36,000 L; 7,900 imp gal)
- Boiler pressure: 200 lb/in^{2} (14 kg/cm^{2})
- Cylinders: Two, outside
- Cylinder size: 26 in × 30 in (660 mm × 760 mm)
- Valve gear: Baker
- Valve type: Piston valves
- Loco brake: Air
- Train brakes: Air
- Couplers: Knuckle
Performance figures
- Maximum speed: 55 mph (89 km/h)
- Tractive effort: New: 55,900 lbf (248.7 kN); With Booster: 67,725 lbf (301.3 kN); Rebuilt: 60,484 lbf (269.0 kN); With Booster: 72,309 lbf (321.6 kN)
Career
- Operators: Munising, Marquette and Southeastern Railway; Lake Superior and Ishpeming Railroad; Hocking Valley Scenic Railway; Ohio Central Railroad; Age of Steam Roundhouse
- Class: SC-1
- Numbers: MM&SE 44; LS&I 33; HVSR 33
- Retired: 1957 (revenue service); 1996 (1st excursion service)
- Restored: 1972 (1st excursion service); November 5, 2005 (2nd excursion service)
- Current owner: Age of Steam Roundhouse
- Disposition: Stored, awaiting 1,472-day inspection and overhaul

Lake Superior and Ishpeming 33 is a preserved SC-1 class 2-8-0 "Consolidation" type steam locomotive, built by the Baldwin Locomotive Works (BLW) in April 1916 for the Munising, Marquette and Southeastern Railway as No. 44. In 1924, the MM&SE was purchased by the Lake Superior and Ishpeming Railroad (LSI) and the locomotive was renumbered to 33. It served the LS&I by pulling heavy iron ore trains until it was retired from revenue service in 1957. The following year, it was sold to the Marquette and Huron Mountain tourist railroad to operate in excursion service, but instead sat idle in Marquette.

In 1968, No. 33 was purchased by the founders of the Hocking Valley Scenic Railway in Ohio. Rebuilt to operating condition, No. 33 ran on the HVSR for many years before being sidelined in 1996 for an FRA-required overhaul that couldn't be accomplished. In 2003, No. 33 was traded to the Ohio Central Railroad (OHCR) and was overhauled for some occasional excursion runs between 2005 and 2008. The locomotive briefly operated again around the Age of Steam Roundhouse between 2018 and 2020. As of 2026, No. 33 is sidelined, awaiting to go through a 1,472-day inspection.

== History ==
=== Design and revenue service ===
The Munising, Marquette and Southeastern Railway (MM&SE) was a small railway that operated in the central Upper Peninsula of Michigan alongside the Lake Superior and Ishpeming Railroad (LS&I). At its height, the railroad operated 140 miles of trackage, which was used to help their timber operations. In the mid-1910s, as iron ore traffic boomed before and during World War I, the LS&I and MM&SE designed and ordered a new class of 2-8-0 "consolidation" types, classified as SC-1s, from the Baldwin Locomotive Works (BLW) of Philadelphia, Pennsylvania; the LS&I ordered three while the MM&SE only ordered one. The MM&SE locomotive was No. 33, which was numbered 44 at the time. It was needed to haul the long and heavy iron ore drags from the Princeton-Gwinn ore district, which was then producing much high-grade ore, to Marquette. The terrain between this district and Marquette, the ore port, was somewhat different than the 1.6% grade between Negaunee and Ishpeming, in that there were two heavy but shorter grades through and out of Gwinn and one longer six-mile grade between Little Lake and Carlshend, where it was necessary to "double" the hill, despite the force of No. 44's tractive effort of 55,900 pounds-force (249 kN). No. 44, as well as the LS&I's SC-1s, were among the most powerful 2-8-0s ever built, and they were nicknamed Hogs by crews.

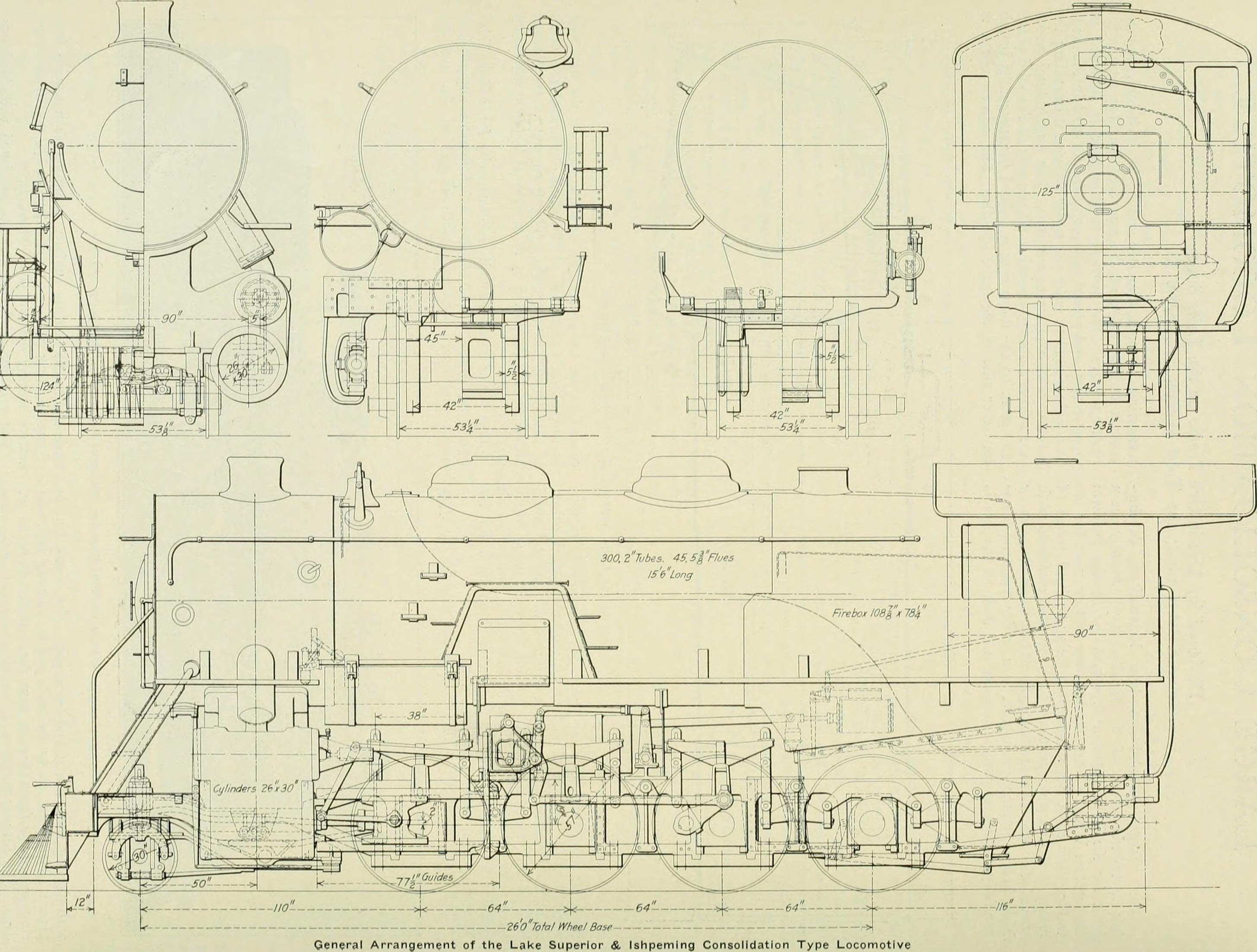
The original 1916 diagram for the SC-1, No. 33's original class

In 1924, the MM&SE was absorbed into the LS&I, increasing the latter's overhead and locomotive fleet. The SC-1s were renumbered 30-33, but the following year, the LS&I purchased two former Chicago River and Indiana 2-8-0s Nos. 1 and 2 from the General Equipment Company, and while they were renumbered 30 and 31, the SC-1s 30 and 31 became 34 and 35. Between 1925 and 1927, almost all the SC-1s, with the exception of No. 34, were given booster trucks beneath their tenders, which increased their tractive effort to 67,725 pounds-force (301.26 kN), but this figure was later raised to 72,309 pounds-force (321.65 kN) when the regular tractive effort of each SC-1 was boosted to 60,484 pounds-force (269.05 kN) in the 1930s. Until the arrival of the LS&I's 2-10-2 "Santa Fe" types from the Hocking Valley Railway (HV) in 1930, the SC-1s remained as the backbone of the LS&I's mainline ore services, as they muscled heavy car loads of iron ore trains, but they were unfrequently used during the winter, so their usage was prolonged. No. 33 continued to pull iron ore between Marquette, Negaunee, and West Ishpeming, and as the 1950s progressed, it was re-assigned for heavy switching whenever needed. By 1962, however, the LS&I had made a complete transition to diesel power, and No. 33 was retired in 1957 before it was stored in one of the LS&I's sidelines.

=== Preservation ===
In 1963, the railroad sold eleven of their 2-8-0s, as well as some of their passenger cars, to former LS&I employee John A. Zerbal, who founded the Marquette and Huron Mountain Tourist Railroad. He had plans to operate all the steam locomotives he had purchased to help provide intensive services at a resort complex he had planned to serve. However, there are no known records of No. 33 pulling any trains for that railroad. Only three of the SC-4s, Numbers 19, 22, and 23, were ever known to pull tourist trains there between Marquette and Big Bay. Instead, No. 33 sat idle until 1968, when the locomotive was purchased by Frank L. McCauley, Ted Goodman, and Jerry Ballard, whom also had plans to create a tourist railroad. At first, it was planned to be called the "Salt Creek Railroad", as they wanted to operate it over Ex-Detroit, Toledo and Ironton trackage that lead to Wellston, Ohio. However, the trackage was already ripped up before details of the line could be finalized. Sometime later, they decided to change the name of the planned operation to the Hocking Valley Scenic Railway (HVSR) right after purchasing the Monday Creek line.

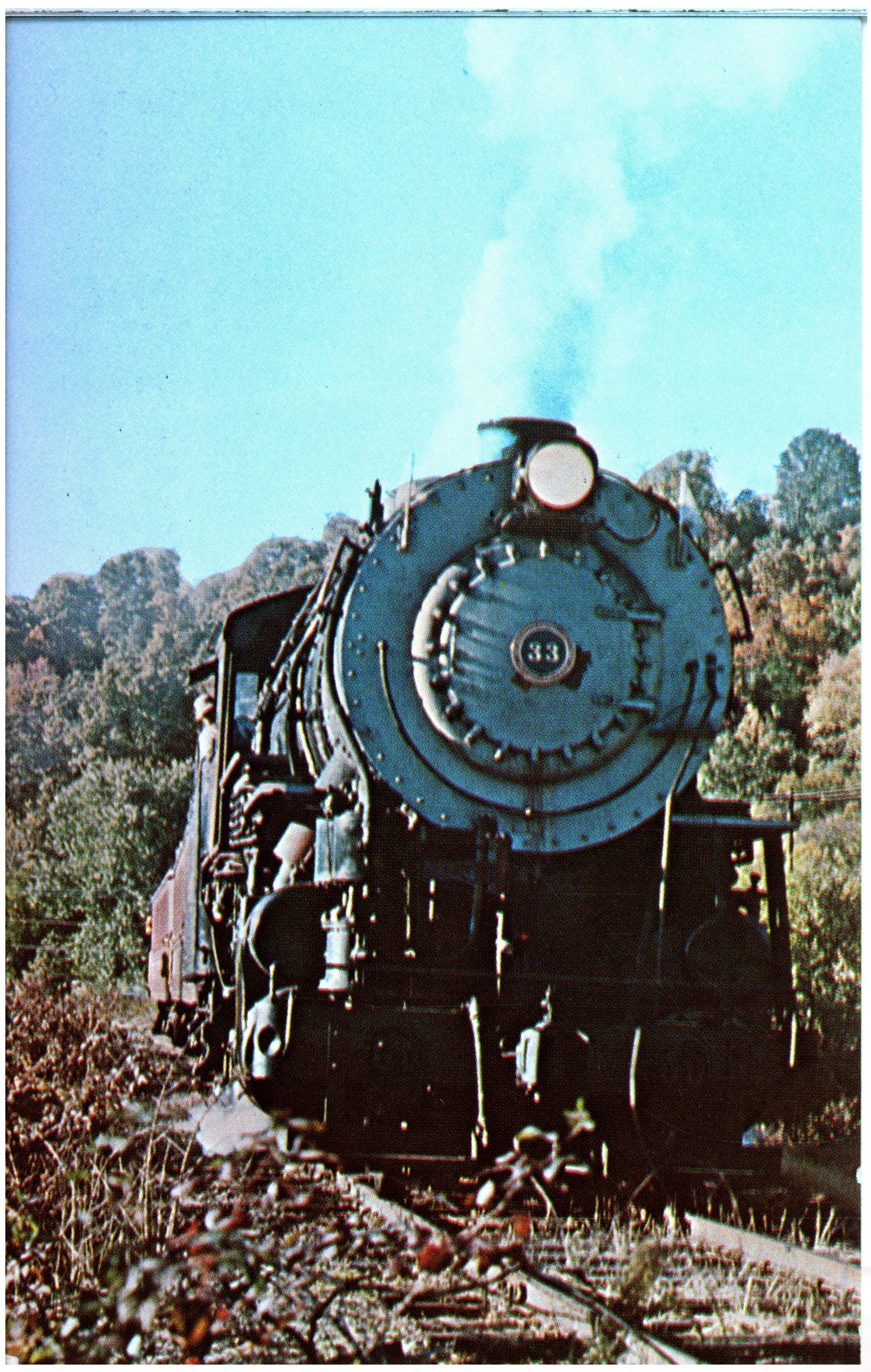
No. 33 idling at the rail yard on the Hocking Valley Scenic Railway

No. 33 was moved to the Chesapeake and Ohio's (C&O) Parson Yard roundhouse to begin restoration work, which included the removal of the booster truck from the tender, and in 1972, No. 33 was fired up and moved under its own power for the first time in ten years. It also pulled the HVSR's first train between Jackson and Oak Hill. In August the following year, No. 33 pulled a special excursion for the town of Jackson's centennial celebration. In 1976, the HVSR purchased their own enginehouse in Nelsonville, so No. 33 could be stored on their own property. In 1983, however, the Monday Creek short line was ripped up, but not before the HVSR moved their property, including No. 33, to the former C&O Armitage Subdivision remnant south of Nelsonville. Now, the HVSR lies between Nelsonville and Logan, and while being joined by a small fleet of diesel locomotives, No. 33 resumed in excursion service on HVSR's new trackage. However, No. 33's excursion career on the HVSR wouldn't last any longer; in 1995, the HVSR lost its original engine house as the land it stood on was purchased by another owner. In addition, the Federal Railroad Administration (FRA) introduced new federal boiler regulations and inspections for active steam locomotives after a recent incident from the Gettysburg Railroad (GETY) of Pennsylvania. Without proper facility to perform the required overhaul, No. 33 was retired from the HVSR by the end of 1996, and it remained sidelined for the next seven years.

=== Excursion service ===
In 2003, Jerry Joe Jacobson, founder of the Ohio Central Railroad, approached an agreement with the HVSR to trade EMD gp10 No. 701 in exchange for No. 33. On September 22, the locomotive left HVSR property and arrived at the OC's Morgan Run shops to begin the restoration process. The estimated time for No. 33 to run again was in 2004 for that year's Trainfest, but then it was pushed to one more year. On November 5, 2005, No. 33 was test fired once again, and it only ran a few times in 2005, since there weren't any excursions that year other than the Polar Express excursion. It wasn't until on April 19, 2008 when No. 33 pulled its first official excursion on the OC, which ran from Sugarcreek to Morgan Run as part of The Ohio Tourist Rail Association's convention. There were talks of running the locomotive again on July 10, but due to the owners' absence, the trip had to be cancelled, No. 33 was eventually withdrawn from service again and put into storage.

By the end of 2008, the OC was sold to the Genesee and Wyoming (G&W) corporation, and Jacobson used most of the money he had received from the sale to construct the new Age of Steam Roundhouse in Sugarcreek, a museum filled with a steam locomotive collection in which No. 33 became a part of Jerry Jacob's collection. After another ten years of inactivity, No. 33 received some much needed firebox repairs, and it was brought back into service on November 11, 2018. It ran back and forth across the AOSR's yard until 2020, when the locomotive became due for its 1,472-day boiler inspection. As of 2026, No. 33 sits on display inside the AOSR along with the rest of the collection. No. 33's next overhaul is currently on the waiting list, as the AOSR has planned to overhaul Canadian Pacific 4-6-2 No. 1293 before 33. It will likely be a few more years before No. 33 will run again.

== See also ==
- Grand Canyon Railway 29
- Western Maryland Scenic Railroad 734
- Grand Trunk Western 6325
- Canadian Pacific 1293
- Southern Railway 1643
