= Duluth and Northern Minnesota 14 =

Preserved American 2-8-2 locomotive

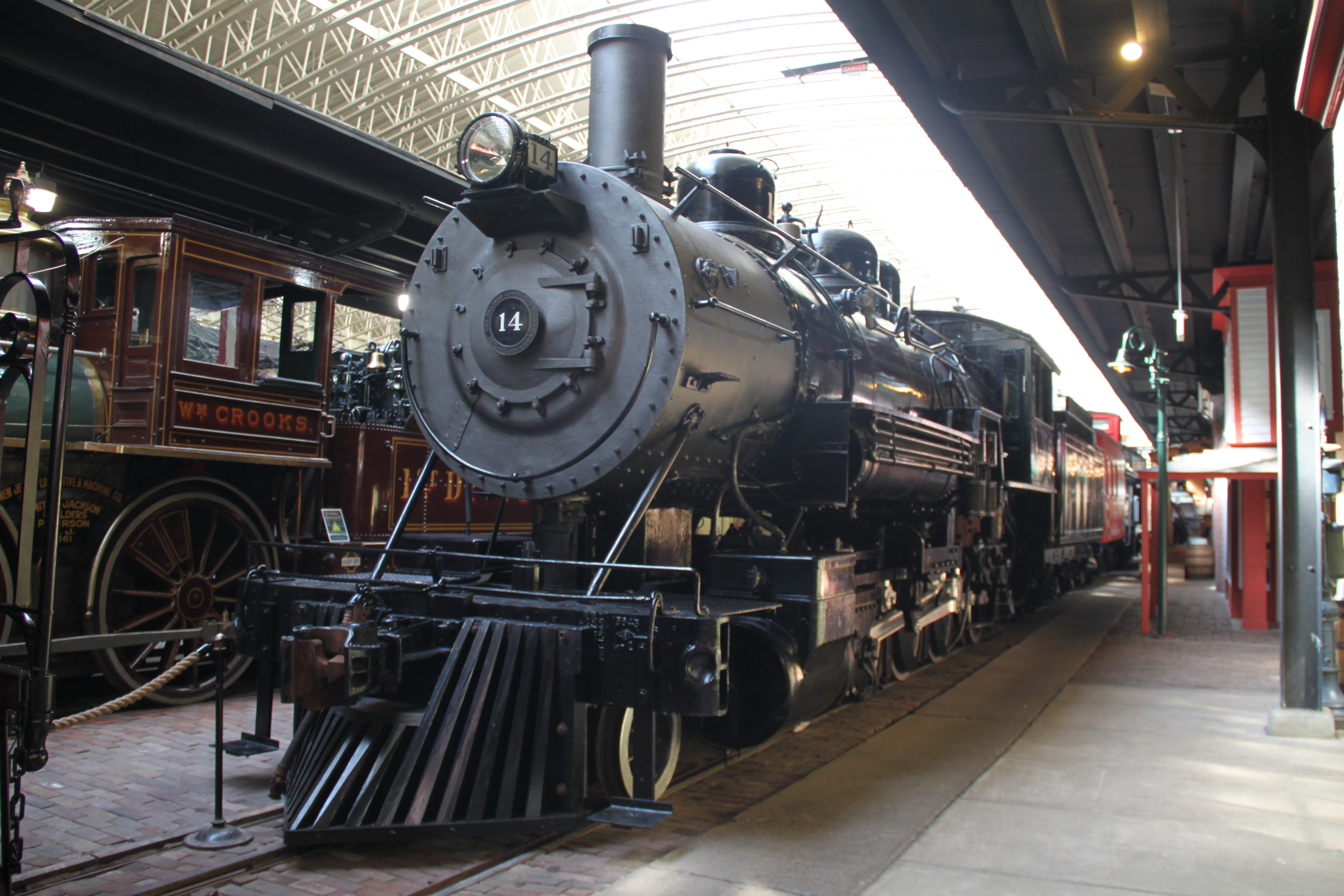
- No. 14 on display inside the Lake Superior Railroad Museum, 2017
Type and origin
- Power type: Steam
- Builder: Baldwin Locomotive Works
- Serial number: 39665
- Build date: April 1913
Specifications
- Configuration
  - Whyte: 2-8-2
  - UIC: 1'D1 h
- Gauge: 4 ft 8 1/2 in (1,435 mm) standard gauge
- Driver dia.: 51 in (1,300 mm)
- Wheelbase: 57.33 ft (17.47 m)
  - Engine: 28.42 ft (8.66 m)
- Adhesive weight: 137,000 lb (62,000 kg)
- Loco weight: 178,000 lb (81,000 kg)
- Tender weight: 115,000 lb (52,000 kg)
- Total weight: 293,000 lb (133,000 kg)
- Fuel type: Coal
- Fuel capacity: 10 lb (4.5 kg; 0.0 t)
- Water cap.: 6,000 US gal (23,000 L; 5,000 imp gal)
- Firebox
  - Grate area: 41.30 sq ft (3.837 m^{2})
- Boiler pressure: 200 psi (1,400 kPa)
- Heating surface
  - Firebox: 153 sq ft (14.2 m^{2})
- Cylinders: Two, outside
- Cylinder size: 20 in × 28 in (510 mm × 710 mm)
- Valve gear: Walschaerts
- Valve type: Piston valves
- Loco brake: Air
- Train brakes: Air
- Couplers: Knuckle
Performance figures
- Tractive effort: 37,333 lb (16,934 kg)
- Factor of adh.: 3.67
Career
- Operators: Duluth and Northern Minnesota Railroad; Lake Superior and Ishpeming Railroad; Inland Steel Company; North Shore Scenic Railroad
- Class: 13 (D&NM); MK-1 (LS&I)
- Numbers: D&NM 14; LS&I 22; LS&I 14; Inland 14; GN 807
- Retired: 1966 (revenue Service); October 3, 1998 (excursion Service)
- Restored: July 6, 1992
- Current owner: Lake Superior Railroad Museum
- Disposition: On static display

Duluth and Northern Minnesota 14 is a preserved MK class 2-8-2 light "Mikado" type steam locomotive, built by the Baldwin Locomotive Works for the Duluth and Northern Minnesota Railroad in 1913. In 1919, the D&NM declared bankruptcy, and the locomotive was sold to the Michigan-based Lake Superior and Ishpeming Railroad, to operate there as No. 22. It was renumbered back to 14 in 1923. In 1959, No. 14 was sold to the Inland Stone Division of Inland Steel Company, another Michigan-based corporation, and it operated there until 1966. In 1974, it was transferred to the Duluth, Missabe and Iron Range Railway, and then donated to the Lake Superior Railroad Museum in 1981. The locomotive was restored to operation for use on the museum's North Shore Scenic Railroad between 1992 and 1998. Since then, No. 14 has remained on static display at the museum in Duluth, Minnesota.

== History ==
=== Revenue service ===
The Duluth and Northern Minnesota Railroad (D&NM) was a logging company based in Knife River, Minnesota, which was 20 miles north of Duluth. They purchased two lightweight class 13 2-8-2 "Mikado" types in April 1913 from the Baldwin Locomotive Works of Philadelphia, Pennsylvania, numbered 13 and 14. They were the largest steam locomotives used on a Minnesota logging line, weighing in excess of 90 tons in working order. Primarily used as a freight hauler, No. 14 occasionally saw service as a passenger locomotive when it was assigned to the daily mixed train between Knife River and Finland, or on weekend “Fisherman’s Special” trains that took local residents into the woods. In 1919, the Alger-Smith Lumber Company shut down its operations, including the D&NM.

As part of their liquidation process, Numbers 13 and 14 were sold off to the Lake Superior and Ishpeming Railroad (LS&I), who reclassified them as MK-1s and renumbered them to 21 and 22, since numbers 13 and 14 were occupied by two B-4 class 2-8-0 "Consolidation" types at the time. No. 22 was reassigned by the LS&I to pull iron ore trains between West Ishpeming, Negaunee, and Marquette, Michigan. Though rather slow and lumbering, No. 22 could pull long and heavy trains, or "like all get-out", as railroad men remarked, and it never stalled when the trains grew heavier. Although, the sound of its bell was not pleasant for the crews’ liking, and they claimed that its whistle was strident enough to make one jump. In 1923, the LS&I purchased the Munising, Marquette and Southeastern Railway, and while 2-8-0 No. 14 was renumbered to 29, the MK-1 was renumbered 14 again. No. 21 was also renumbered 15.

No. 14 continued in revenue service, spotting cars around the ore mines, as well as pulling log trains when other locomotives mainly used for this work were temporarily sidelined. It also occasionally saw use pulling mixed trains on the mainline. Engineers always liked the locomotive for its big cab and for its strength to haul a phenomenally huge train. A peculiar feature of it was the noticeable steam-sounding peep emitting out of the smoke stack just before the exhaust. As the 1950s progressed, No. 14 was stored for stand-by service; it was last used by the LS&I during the Winter months in Negaunee and Ishpeming on "roustabout" service whenever diesel locomotives weren't available. By March 28, 1959, No. 15 was sold for scrap, while No. 14 was sold to the Inland Lime and Stone Division of Inland Steel Company of Port Inland, Michigan. There, it was reassigned as a switcher for a few seasons, but by 1966, No. 14 was retired from revenue service, and it was then used as a portable steam generator to supply steam and hot water for thawing limestone.

=== Preservation ===
In 1974, the Duluth, Missabe and Iron Range Railway's president, Donald B. Shank, who was also the founder of the Lake Superior Railroad Museum, became aware of No. 14’s existence and whereabouts. He made inquires to Inland, and the company that owned No. 14 agreed to trade it in exchange for one of the DM&IR's surplus hot water generator cars. The locomotive was towed to Proctor, Minnesota in 1975, and it was officially donated to the LSRM six years later. Later on, the LSRM was looking to restore a steam locomotive to operating condition for use their new North Shore Scenic Railroad, and No. 14 was in decent mechanical condition. In October 1988, No. 14 was sent to Fraser Shipyards in Superior, Wisconsin for boiler work. By early 1990, Fraser completed multiple repairs on No. 14, and it was moved to the Hallett Dock Company shops in Duluth for extensive work. It returned to the LSRM in September 1991, where the remainder of restoration work was completed.

On July 6, 1992, No. 14 was fired up and moved under its own power for the first time in twenty-six years, and on July 11, No. 14 pulled its first excursion train from Duluth to Two Harbors with a Christening ceremony. The highlight of this trip was when it passed through Knife River, where the locomotive had last worked seventy-three years prior. Over the next six years No. 14 was used on North Shore Scenic and traveled to several communities in Minnesota and Wisconsin to pull special excursion trains, and occasionally, it would be assisted by EMD FP7 No. 2500. Its last run took place on October 3, 1998. Afterwards, the LSRM no longer had plans to run a steam locomotive, and No. 14 was left as a static display piece. In 2001, the LSRM's members discussed the probability of giving No. 14 another overhaul for operational purposes. However, those plans fell through, and the museum decided to concentrate their efforts on other projects.

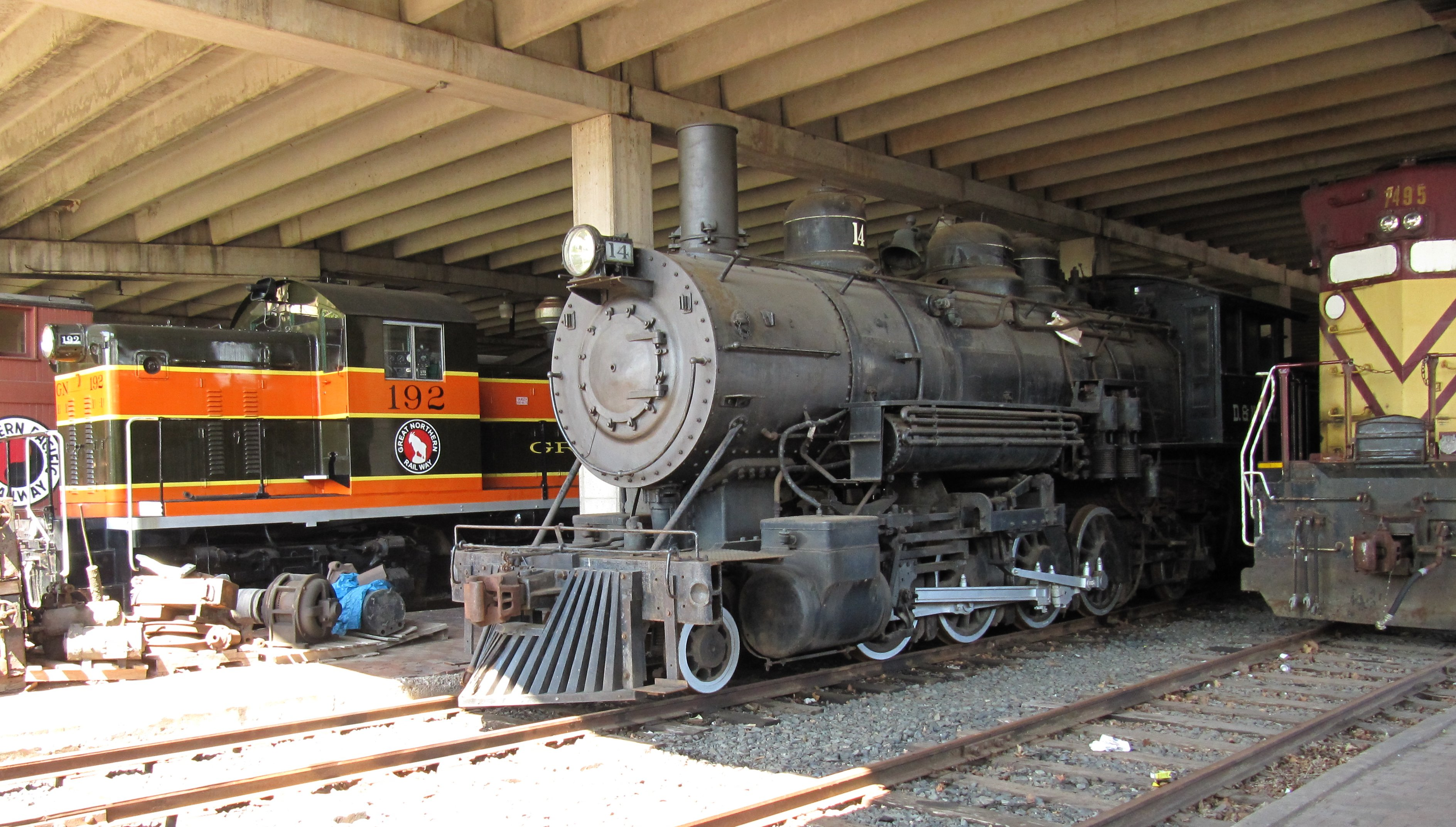
No. 14 on static display outside in between Soo Line No. 7495 and Great Northern No. 192 in 2010

For the next several years, No. 14 would remain on outdoor display beneath an engine shed, exposed to the elements. On May 11, 2013, No. 14 was brought out of its display site to participate in National Train Day. It sat opposite from that night's photo session, which featured Soo Line 4-6-2 No. 2719 and Milwaukee Road 4-8-4 No. 261. Once the event was over, No. 14 was towed back to its display site. In November 2014, the LSRM began the process of giving No. 14 a cosmetic restoration to improve its appearance after sitting out in the open for so long. A new number plate was also fabricated to replace the original, which the LSRM still has in its collection but is keeping off the locomotive to discourage theft. LSRM member Gordon Mott funded the restoration. The following spring, several pieces of equipment were pulled outside for use on the North Shore Scenic Railroad, and No. 14 was moved inside the LSRM's building for permanent display. In June 2019, No. 14 was put back on outdoor display, and it was lined up with No. 2719, Minnesota Steel 0-4-0 No. 7, and Duluth & Northeastern 28 to greet Union Pacific Big Boy No. 4014, which visited the museum as part of its 2019 tour in the Midwest. As of 2025, No. 14 still remains at the LSRM at Duluth, and there are no plans to bring the locomotive back to service on the horizon.

== Appearance in Iron Will ==
In 1993, No. 14 was selected as the locomotive used to be recorded in the "Arrowhead" region for the 1994 Walt Disney film Iron Will, which starred Mackenzie Astin, Kevin Spacey, David Ogden Stiers, and George Gerdes, and it was directed by Charles Haid. It is a fictionalized account of a 1917 cross-country sled dog race sponsored by the Great Northern Railway. In some scenes, No. 14 would appear in its original livery, and in other scenes, including many of the racing scenes, it would masquerade as Great Northern No. 807 with a golden smoke stack and a red number plate. Although the original GN 807 was a 4-8-0 "Mastodon", not a 2-8-2.

== See also ==
- Grand Canyon Railway 29
- Lake Superior and Ishpeming 23
- Soo Line 2719
- Duluth & Northeastern 28
- McCloud Railway 18
