= Chicago and North Western 175 =

Preserved American 4-6-0 steam locomotive

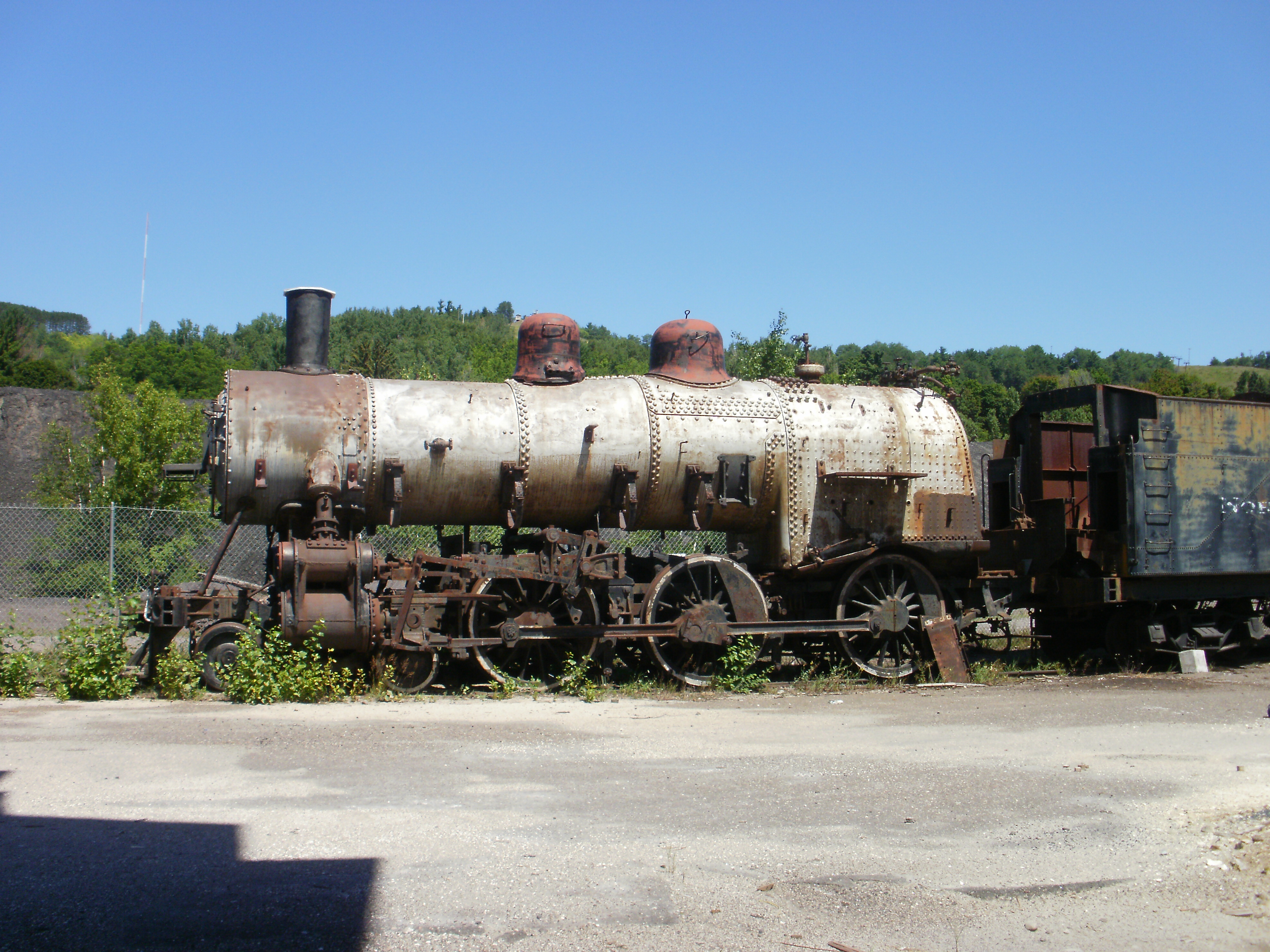
- C&NW No. 175 sitting near the ruins of the Quincy Smelter plant on July 28, 2012
Type and origin
- Power type: Steam
- Builder: American Locomotive Company
- Serial number: 45727
- Build date: December 1908
Specifications
- Configuration
  - Whyte: 4-6-0
  - UIC: 2′C n2
- Gauge: 4 ft 8 1/2 in (1,435 mm)
- Trucks: Truck No. 3
- Leading dia.: 30 in (0.762 m)
- Driver dia.: 63 in (1.600 m)
- Tender wheels: 33 in (0.838 m)
- Minimum curve: 301 ft (92 m) radius/ 19°
- Wheelbase
  - Engine: 25 ft 10 in (7.87 m)
  - Leading: 6 ft 4 in (1.93 m)
  - Drivers: 14 ft 10 in (4.52 m)
- Height: 14 ft 11 5/8 in (4.56 m)
- Adhesive weight: 135,000 lb (61,000 kg)
- Loco weight: 181,000 lb (82,000 kg)
- Tender weight: 140,000 lb (64,000 kg)
- Fuel type: Coal
- Fuel capacity: 10 tonnes (9.8 long tons; 11.0 short tons)
- Water cap.: 7,500 US gal (28,000 L; 6,200 imp gal)
- Firebox
  - Type: Radial stay (round-top)
  - Grate area: 46.27 sq ft (4.299 m^{2}) (102 in × 65 1/4 in or 2.591 m × 1.657 m)
- Boiler
  - Diameter: 66 1/4 in (1.683 m)
  - Small tubes: 2 in (51 mm)
  - Large tubes: 5 3/8 in (137 mm)
- Boiler pressure: 200 psi (1,400 kPa)
- Heating surface
  - Firebox: 152.00 sq ft (14.121 m^{2})
  - Tubes and flues: 2,333.24 sq ft (216.765 m^{2})
  - Total surface: 2,508.98 sq ft (233.092 m^{2})
- Cylinders: Two, outside
- Cylinder size: 21 in × 26 in (533 mm × 660 mm)
- Valve gear: Walschaerts
- Valve type: Piston valves
- Loco brake: Air
- Train brakes: Air
- Couplers: Knuckle
Performance figures
- Tractive effort: 30,900 lbf (137 kN)
- Factor of adh.: 4.37
Career
- Operators: Chicago and North Western Railway
- Class: R-1
- Numbers: CNW 175
- Retired: September 24, 1957
- Current owner: Steam Railroading Institute
- Disposition: Undergoing restoration to operating condition

Chicago and North Western 175 is a preserved R-1 class 4-6-0 "Ten-wheeler" type steam locomotive, built in December 1908 by the American Locomotive Company (ALCO). The locomotive was used for pulling various passenger and freight trains throughout Wisconsin, until the Chicago and North Western (C&NW) Railroad ended revenue steam operations in 1956.

No. 175 was used to pull one excursion train in September of the following year, before it was retired. In 1964, the locomotive was sold to Clint Jones. Jones had plans to use it on the Keweenaw Central Railroad for excursion service alongside Copper Range 2-8-0 No. 29, but restoration work was never completed under his ownership. No. 175 subsequently spent over four decades in outdoor storage in Hancock, Michigan.

In 2017, it was purchased by the Steam Railroading Institute (SRI), who moved it to their location in Owosso, Michigan. As of 2026, the SRI is rebuilding the locomotive to eventually have it serve as a running mate to Pere Marquette 2-8-4 No. 1225. No. 175 remains the only surviving C&NW steam locomotive to be equipped with Walschaerts valve gear.

== History ==
=== Construction and revenue service ===
Between 1901 and 1908, the Chicago and North Western (C&NW) Railroad ordered 325 R-1 class 4-6-0 "ten-wheeler" locomotives from the American Locomotive Company (ALCO) and the Baldwin Locomotive Works. The R-1s initially had drastically-limited route availabilities, due to their excessive weight and size, so the C&NW had to resort to upgrading their entire rail infrastructure to accommodate them.

The infrastructure upgrades were completed in 1939, and the R-1s were permitted to travel all across the C&NW system by then. The majority of the R-1 locomotives were equipped with Stephenson valve gear, but the eccentric rods of the Stephenson gear were prone to wearing out from the greater size of the driving axles, and the internal valve gear was becoming difficult to maintain.

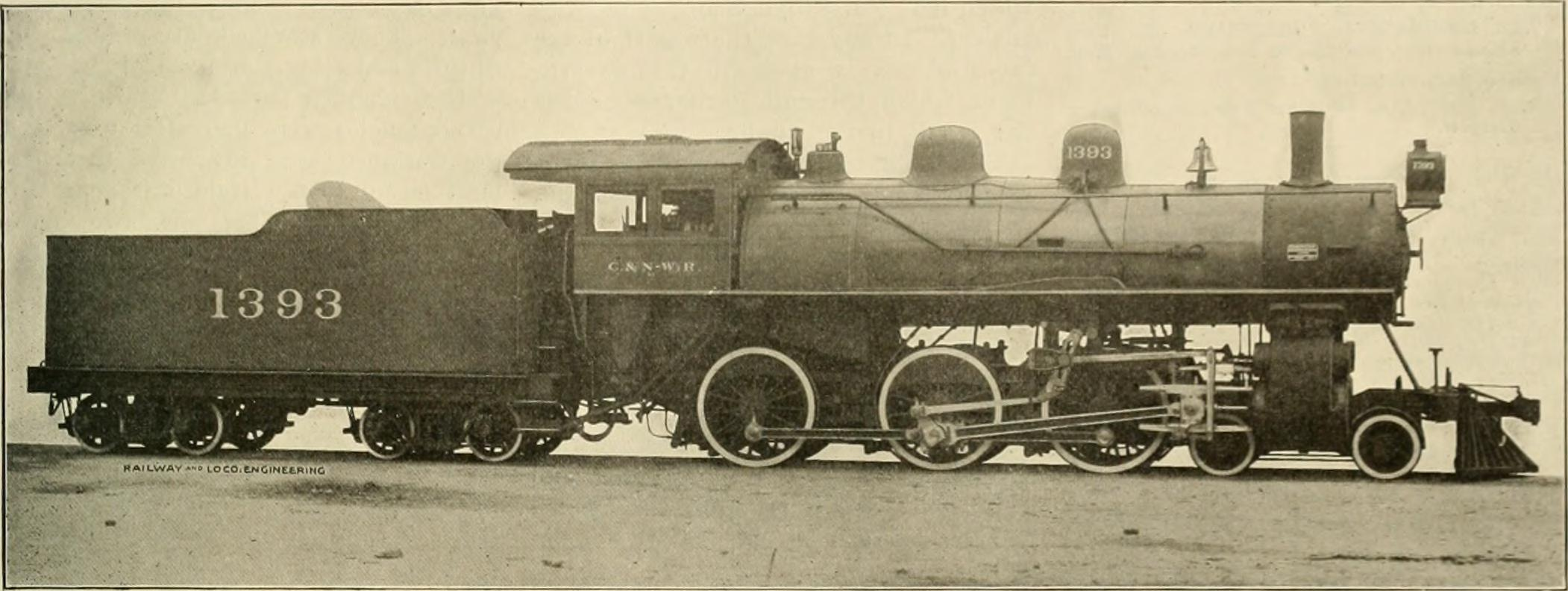
1907 builder's photo of C&NW No. 1393, the first R-1 to be built with Walschaerts valve gear

With Walschaerts valve gear being reintroduced to the U.S. locomotive market after 1904, the C&NW asked ALCO in 1907 to construct five R-1s with Walschaerts gear for testing. The railroad became satisfied with their improved performance, so the final thirty-five R-1s built throughout 1908 were built with Walschaerts gear. No. 175 was one of the last twenty-five R-1s to be built by ALCO in December 1908.

With the Walschaerts-powered R-1s being equipped with steam-heating and air signal line equipment, they were used to pull more passenger trains than most of the Stephenson-powered R-1s were. The C&NW assigned No. 175 to pull commuter trains within the Wisconsin Division, and some of the trains led to Chicago, Illinois. While the railroad received larger locomotives after 1908, including the H class 4-8-4 "Northerns", they couldn't replace the R-1s on many routes, due to weight restrictions.

More than seventy R-1s, including No. 175, were consequently kept in service by the time the C&NW completely dieselized their operations in 1956. No. 175 spent its final years of revenue service as a switcher before it was retired. On September 24, 1957, following two weeks of preparation work, No. 175 was used to pull a four-car roundtrip excursion between Green Bay and Three Lakes, Wisconsin, and it was to help benefit and promote the National Railroad Museum (NRM) in Green Bay. 186 passengers were on board the train, including executives from other nearby railroads.

Proclaimed as Old 175 during the occasion, No. 175 became the last steam locomotive to run under C&NW ownership. After the excursion, No. 175 was planned to be displayed at the NRM after a shed had been constructed on the property, but for unknown reasons, the locomotive was never moved to the museum. The R-1 was left in storage in Winona, Minnesota as back-up power for steam-heating usage. By 1960, No. 175 was one of only two R-1 locomotives to remain under C&NW's possession, with the other being No. 1385, and the railroad was looking to sell them both off.

=== Retirement and storage ===
Members of the Railway Historical Society of Milwaukee (later known as the Mid-Continent Railway Museum (MCRY) negotiated with the C&NW about acquiring one of the two R-1s. Since No. 175 had a heavier weight from its Walschaerts valve gear, the railroad asked for more money for No. 175's scrap value, so the Historical Society opted to purchase No. 1385, instead. No. 175 was later sold on December 15, 1960, to the Winona County Historical Society, who had plans to put the locomotive on outdoor static display. In late 1964, 20-year-old railfan and MCRY member Clinton Jones, Jr. purchased No. 175 from the Winona group out of sentimentality, having watched the locomotive pull iron ore hoppers as a preteen. Jones quickly had the R-1 moved from Winona to Calumet, Michigan on the Milwaukee Road (MILW) mainline.

He began work to restore No. 175 to operating condition, and he had to consult with retired C&NW employees and study old blueprints and textbooks for information about the locomotive's mechanics. Many of the locomotive's components were removed, and with the original tender being in poor condition, it was sold for scrap and replaced with a larger tender from a Northern Pacific (NP) 4-6-0. Jones collaborated with Fred L. Tonne and Louis S. Keller to create an organization, and he planned to use No. 175 to pull revenue freight and passenger excursion trains on an old branch line.

In 1967, Jones' organization acquired the Copper Range Railroad's abandoned 6.5-mile (10.5 km) line between Calumet and Lake Linden, Michigan, and they began operating a new tourist railroad called the Keweenaw Central Railroad. Ex-Copper Range 2-8-0 "Consolidation" type No. 29 was the main motive power for their excursion runs. No. 175 was planned to be used as standby power for whenever No. 29 would suffer a mechanical problem, but its rebuild under Jones' ownership was never completed. In 1972, the Copper Range filed for bankruptcy, and all of their remaining trackage was abandoned and mostly ripped up.

Consequently, the Keweenaw Central was forced to remove their equipment from Calumet, and Nos. 175 and 29 were moved inside one of the sheds at the Quincy Smelter plant in Hancock for storage. Afterwards, the Soo Line Railroad abandoned and ripped up the only trackage that connected the plant to the national rail network, and Jones could not afford to remove his two locomotives from the property via truck. As a result, No. 175 spent the next four and a half decades in Hancock. In 1979, the shed that was used to store Jones' locomotives collapsed from heavy snow, and No. 175 was moved outdoors. While No. 175's boiler, frame, running gear, and NP tender were stored outdoors, many of the locomotive's other components were stored inside an undisclosed facility owned by Jones' new company, Mineral Range Incorporated.

In 2004, No. 29 was traded and moved to the MCRY in North Freedom, Wisconsin, leaving No. 175 the last remaining locomotive to be stored by the Quincy plant, which was then owned by the National Park Service (NPS). Around the same time, the Langlade County Historical Society of Antigo, Wisconsin made Mineral Range an offer to purchase No. 175, since they were looking for a steam locomotive to display at their heritage center, and No. 175 held historical significance at Antigo. Mineral Range turned down the offer, and instead, they sold them Ex-Union Pacific 2-8-0 No. 440, a locomotive that they had received from the MCRY in exchange for No. 29.

=== Steam Railroading Institute ownership ===
In 2017, Mineral Range Inc. entered negotiations with the Steam Railroading Institute (SRI), and they made an offer to sell No. 175. The SRI agreed to purchase the locomotive, and they subsequently made plans to restore and operate the R-1 alongside Pere Marquette 2-8-4 "Berkshire" No. 1225.

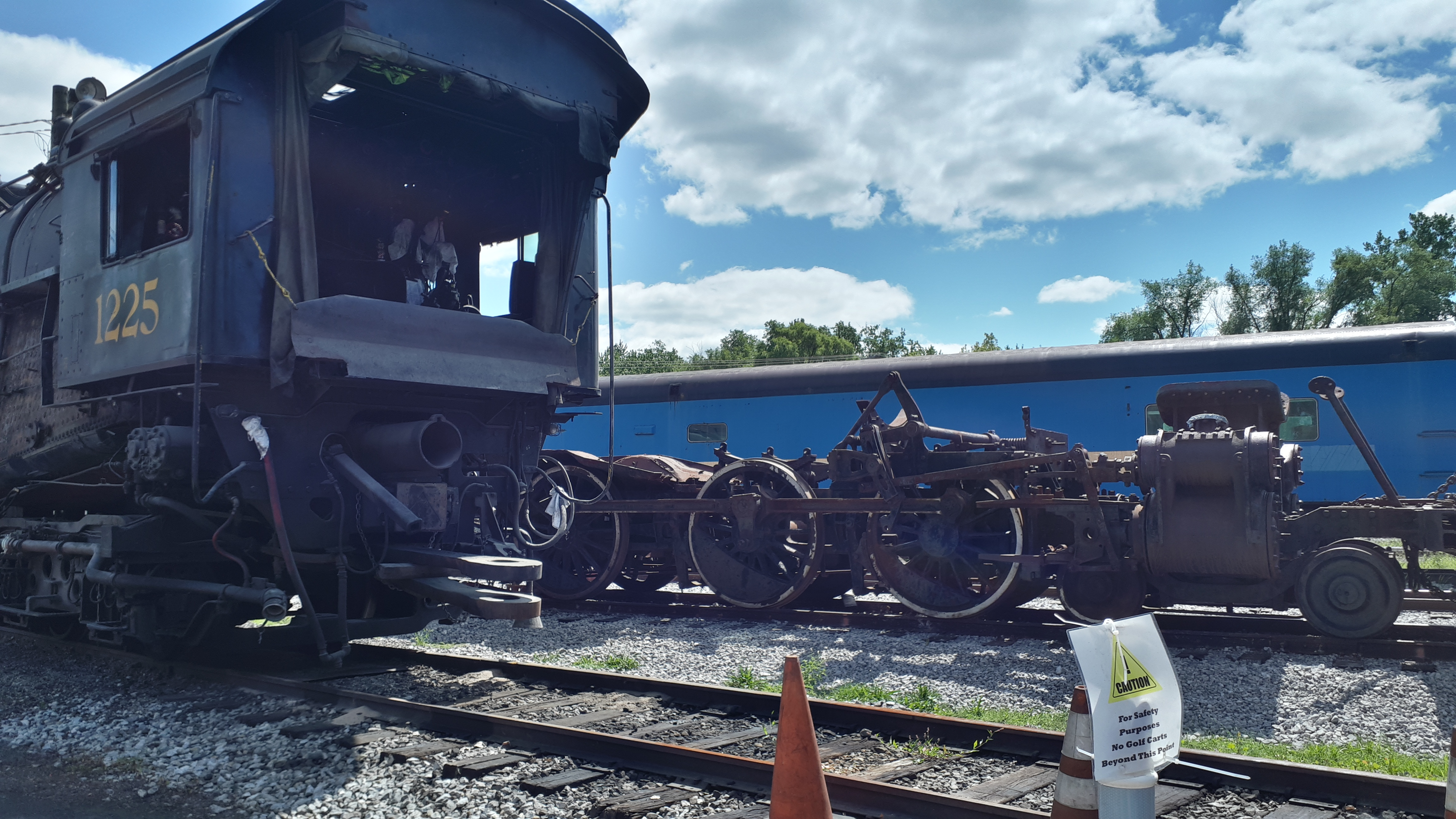
No. 175's running gear sitting next to Pere Marquette No. 1225 on August 24, 2019

The SRI had previously been restoring Ex-Mississippian 2-8-0 No. 76, but that project was cancelled, since No. 76 was in poor mechanical condition, and it did not qualify for state grants, since none of the railroads No. 76 served had any cultural significance in Michigan; No. 175, being a C&NW locomotive, had operated for a number of times in the Upper Peninsula, so it would be more applicable for state grants, and many of its smaller components were still in good condition, as a result of being stored indoors.

In early 2018, No. 175 was disassembled, with the boiler, frame, and other components loaded onto four separate trucks. The shipped components passed the weight and height restrictions of the Mackinac Bridge, and they were transported by road from the Upper Peninsula to the Lower Peninsula. (Note: Shipping the locomotive across Lake Michigan via SS Badger was considered an alternate option.) On June 5, the trucks carrying the components arrived at the SRI's location in Owosso, Michigan, and the scattered parts were publicly displayed for one week.

The boiler was lifted off of one of the trucks and onto the rails, where it was scraped, cleaned, painted, and marked to be inspected and to undergo an ultrasonic test. While most of the boiler was found to be restorable, the lower half of the firebox needed to be replaced. The cab, air pump, one of the eccentric rods, and other parts were also found to be in need of replacing. With the project estimated to cost $1 million to complete, the SRI applied for a large grant to be donated from the state of Michigan.

In August 2022, the Michigan Department of Transportation (MDOT) administered a federal Transportation Alternatives Program (TAP) grant to be donated to the SRI, and the SRI subsequently launched a fundraising campaign to raise $400,000 to meet the matching requirement. Once restoration work is completed, No. 175 will run alongside No. 1225 in pulling the SRI's excursion trains on the Great Lakes Central Railroad (GLC). Its smaller weight will also allow the R-1 to be permitted to travel on routes where No. 1225 is too big to accommodate.

== See also ==
- Duluth and Northern Minnesota 14
- Great Western 90
- Lake Superior and Ishpeming 18
- Soo Line 1003
- Soo Line 2719
- St. Louis-San Francisco 1630
