= Thermic siphon =

Heat-exchanging element in the firebox of some steam boilers

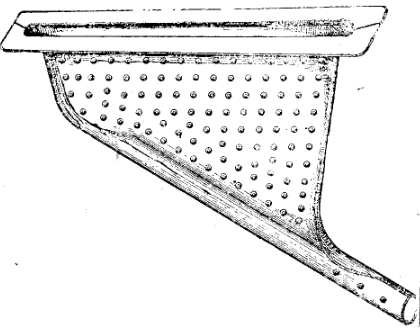
A Nicholson syphon, before installation in the firebox

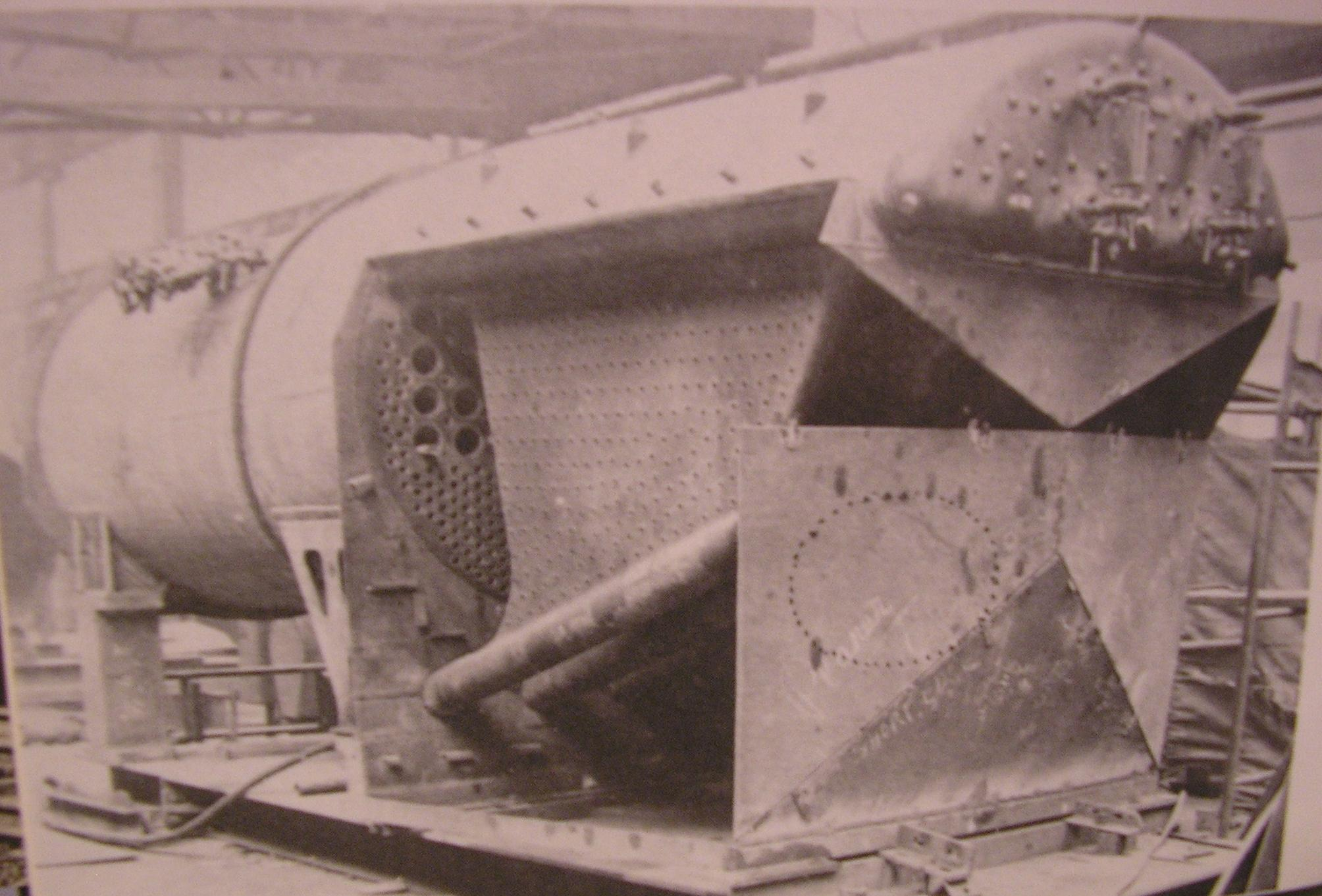
Thermic syphons in the boiler of Bulleid's Leader class. They are particularly visible in the Leader boiler, as the firebox is dry-walled, rather than water-jacketed.

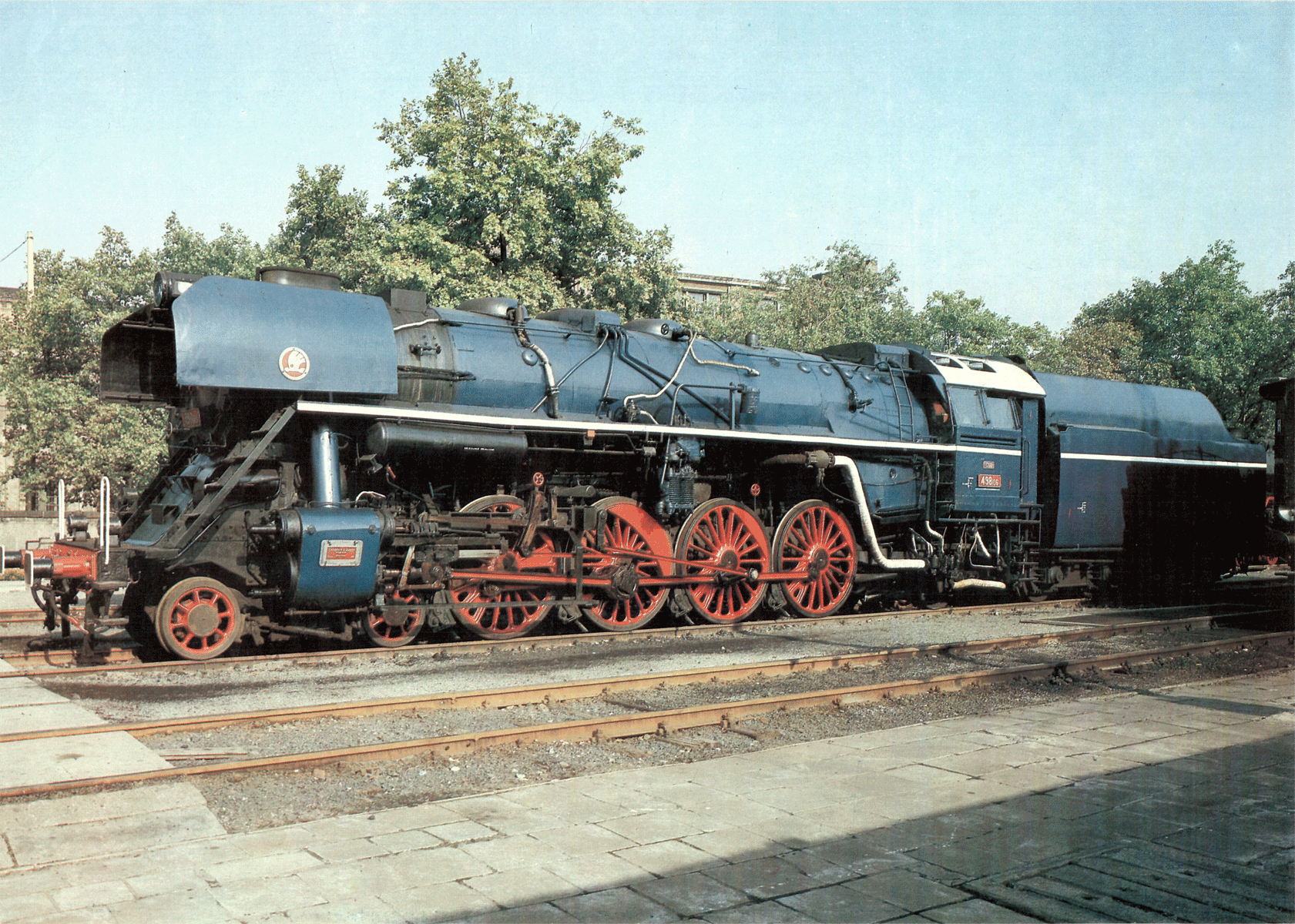
Czechoslovak State Railways 498.1 featured thermic siphons in the firebox

Thermic siphons (alt. thermic syphons) are heat-exchanging elements in the firebox or combustion chamber of some steam boiler and steam locomotive designs. As they are directly exposed to the radiant heat of combustion, they have a high evaporative capacity relative to their size. By arranging them near-vertically, they also have good water circulation by means of the thermosyphon effect.

== History ==
The concept of a self-circulating thermic syphon began with stationary boilers and relatively simple Galloway tubes. They reached their peak in steam locomotive boilers, where the complexity of a syphon was justified by the need for a compact and lightweight means of increasing boiler capacity. One of the best-known forms for locomotives was invented by the English locomotive engineer John L. Nicholson who received a US patent. The Nicholson form was a complex shape that provided more heating area in a given space than did the earlier tubes and funnels, yet was simple to make, being folded from a single sheet of steel.

== Flued boilers ==
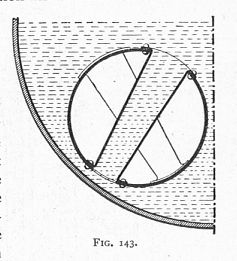
Galloway tubes in a Lancashire boiler

The first high-pressure boilers were a large drum with a central flue, such as the Cornish and Lancashire boilers. Simple tubes were inserted across this flue.

== See also ==
- Thermosiphon
