= Munising, Marquette and Southeastern Railway =

Michigan railway

Overview
- Headquarters: Marquette, Michigan
- Locale: Michigan
- Dates of operation: 1911–1923

Technical
- Track gauge: 4 ft 8 1/2 in (1,435 mm) standard gauge
- Length: 140.4 miles (226.0 km)

The Munising, Marquette and Southeastern Railway (reporting mark MM&SE) was a short-line railroad that operated from 1911 until 1923 in the central Upper Peninsula of the US state of Michigan. At its height, the railroad operated 140.4 miles (226.0 km) of track, which was used to help the timber operations then active in northern Michigan. It was controlled by Cleveland-Cliffs, an iron ore and timber extraction conglomerate, and its successor-in-interest is the Lake Superior and Ishpeming, a railroad that continues to operate as of 2024.

== History and description ==
Two predecessor short lines, the Munising Railway Company and the Marquette and Southeastern Railway Company, were consolidated in April 1911 into the MM&SE. The merged line was incorporated with a declared capital of $1.87 million. This merger created a trackage map that looked like an upside-down T, with the horizontal bar of the T being a main line from Princeton (a junction with the Chicago and North Western near Gwinn) on the west to Munising on the east, and the upright bar of the T being a main line from Lawson, on the east–west main line, to Big Bay in the north. This Lawson–Big Bay line also served Marquette, the central Upper Peninsula's largest city. The main lines, together, accounted for 97.0 miles (156.1 km) of track, with an additional 43.4 miles (69.8 km) of spur lines extending into various groves of harvestable timber.

As timber dwindled and was replaced by less profitable pulpwood, Cleveland-Cliffs interests consolidated the MM&SE into another line they controlled, the Marquette-based Lake Superior and Ishpeming Railroad (LS&I); the 1923 merger ended the MM&SE's existence. The LS&I abandoned the MM&SE's former trackage in the second half of the 20th century. All but a short spur of the last segment, the former main line to Munising, ceased operations in 1979.
