= Lake Superior and Ishpeming 18 =

Preserved American 2-8-0 steam locomotive (LS&I class SC-4)

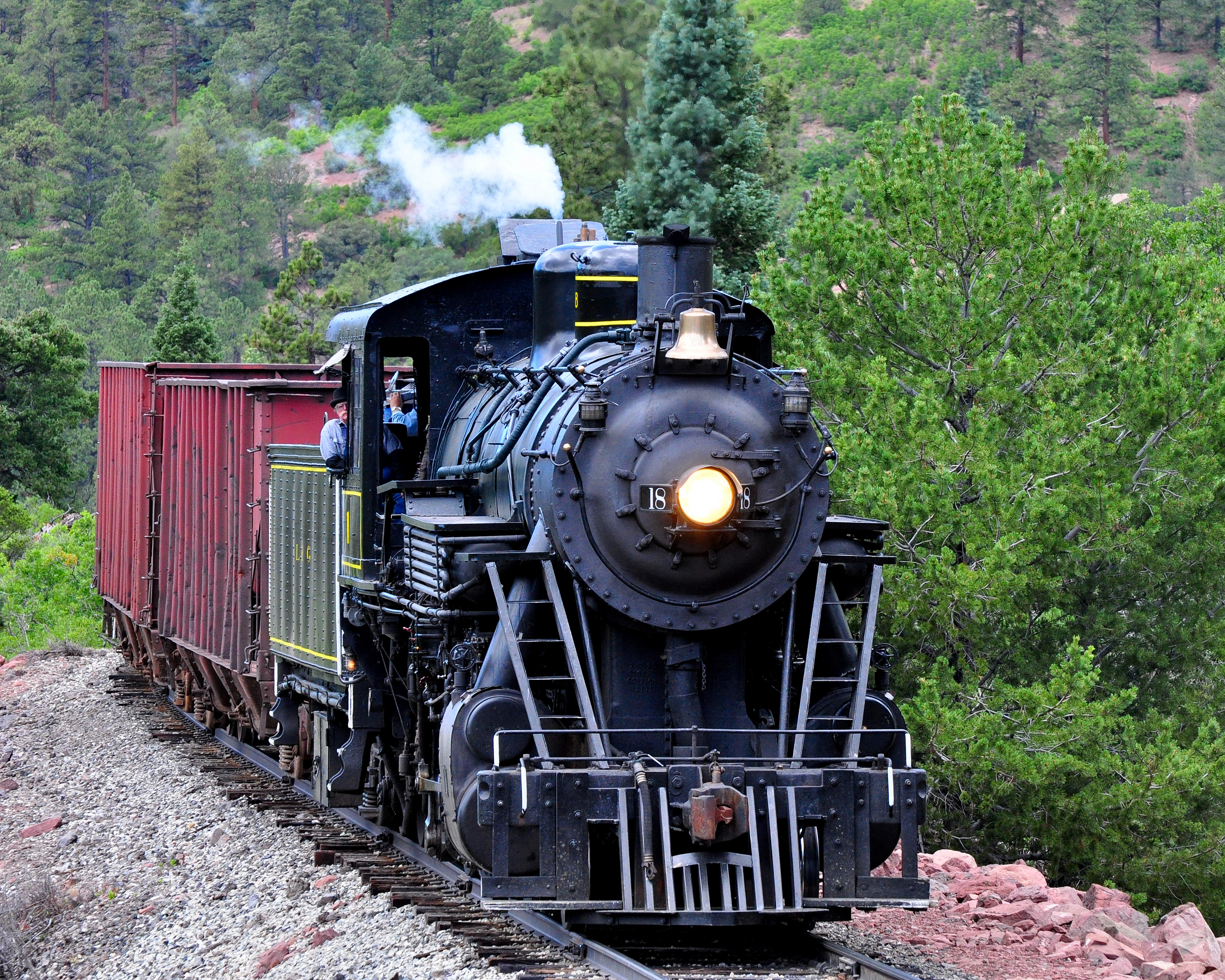
- No. 18 hauling a freight for a photo charter on the Rio Grande Scenic Railroad on August 23, 2011
Type and origin
- Power type: Steam
- Builder: American Locomotive Company (Pittsburg Works)
- Serial number: 46941
- Build date: January 1910
- Rebuilder: Lake Superior and Ishpeming Railroad
- Rebuild date: 1930
Specifications
- Configuration
  - Whyte: 2-8-0
  - UIC: 1'D'h
- Gauge: 4 ft 8 1/2 in (1,435 mm)
- Driver dia.: New: 48 in (1,200 mm); Now: 55 in (1,400 mm)
- Adhesive weight: 168,000 lb (76,000 kg)
- Loco weight: 189,360 lb (85,890 kg)
- Tender weight: 125,700 lb (57,000 kg)
- Total weight: 315,060 lb (142,910 kg)
- Fuel type: New: Coal; Now: Oil
- Fuel capacity: Coal: 10.8 t (10.6 long tons; 11.9 short tons); Oil: 1,900 US gal (7,200 L; 1,600 imp gal)
- Water cap.: 8,700 US gal (33,000 L; 7,200 imp gal)
- Boiler pressure: 200 psi (1,400 kPa)
- Cylinders: Two, outside
- Cylinder size: New: 20 in × 28 in (510 mm × 710 mm); Now: 22 in × 28 in (560 mm × 710 mm)
- Valve gear: New: Baker; Now: Walschaerts
- Valve type: Piston valves
- Loco brake: Air
- Train brakes: Air
- Couplers: Knuckle
Performance figures
- Tractive effort: 42,000 lbf (190 kN)
Career
- Operators: Lake Superior and Ishpeming Railroad; Grand Canyon Railway; Mount Hood Railroad; Colorado Pacific Rio Grande Railroad; Rio Grande Scenic Railroad; Colebrookdale Railroad (leased)
- Class: New: C-5; Now: SC-4
- Number in class: 3rd of 8
- Numbers: LS&I 11; LS&I 18; GCRY 18; MHRR 18; SLRG 18; RSGR 18
- Retired: September 1962 (revenue service); September 2002 (1st excursion service)
- Restored: September 17, 1989 (1st excursion service); July 12, 2007 (2nd excursion service)
- Current owner: Maguire Family Foundation
- Disposition: Undergoing 1,472-day inspection and overhaul

Lake Superior and Ishpeming 18 is an SC-4 class 2-8-0 "Consolidation" type steam locomotive, built by the American Locomotive Company's (ALCO) Pittsburg Works in January 1910 for the Lake Superior and Ishpeming Railroad (LS&I) in Upper Michigan. Originally numbered as No. 11, the locomotive was renumbered to No. 18 in 1924, and it served the railroad until it discontinued steam operations in 1962. No. 18 was subsequently sold to the Marquette and Huron Mountain tourist railroad, where it was put into storage alongside other steam locomotives.

In 1985, No. 18 was sold to the Lake States Steam Association, who made attempts to restore the locomotive to operating condition. In 1989, No. 18 was sold again to the Grand Canyon Railway (GCR). Restoration work on the locomotive was subsequently completed, and No. 18 pulled the railway’s passenger trains between Williams, Arizona and the South Rim of the Grand Canyon, until September 2002.

In 2007, the locomotive was acquired by businessman Brian Fleming, who in turn sold it to the San Luis and Rio Grande Railroad (SLRG) in Colorado. Between 2008 and 2013, No. 18 pulled the SLRG’s tourist trains, but after the railroad filed for bankruptcy, No. 18 was put under receivership. In 2021, the locomotive was purchased by the Maguire Foundation, who reached an agreement with the Colebrookdale Railroad (EBGX) to eventually operate the locomotive on their line in Pennsylvania.

== History ==
=== Design and upgrades ===
By 1909, the Lake Superior and Ishpeming Railroad (LS&I) was planning to sell off four of their older steam locomotives and replace them with new 2-8-0 locomotives in the roster. At a cost of $14,335 each, five new C-5 class 2-8-0s (Nos. 9–13) were constructed for the LS&I by the American Locomotive Company's (ALCO) Pittsburg Works in 1910, with superintendent Walter Chrysler overseeing their construction. (Note: The location was known as Pittsburg Works at the time these locomotives were built from 1891 till 1911.) In 1924, the LS&I was reincorporated after merging with the Munising, Marquette and Southeastern Railway (MM&SE), and the former retained the latter's fleet of three C-5s, expanding the class total to eight.

The LS&I's expanded roster resulted in almost all locomotives being renumbered, with the C-5s being renumbered as Nos. 18–25. The C-5s were originally designed with 20-by-28-inch (508 mm × 711 mm) cylinders, 48-inch (1,219 mm) diameter driving wheels, and outside Pilliod valve gear, and they were able to produce around 34,000 pounds-force (151 kN) of tractive effort. The C-5s were also built with narrow keyhole fireboxes that were placed in between their rear sets of driving wheels, and it resulted in their poor abilities to produce steam, consequently making them underpowered for many of their early assignments.

LS&I C-5 class numbers and details
Pre-1924 Nos.	Post-1924 Nos.	ALCO serial numbers	Notes
LS&I 9	LS&I 23	46939	Rebuilt into an SC-4 in 1928. Preserved.
LS&I 10	LS&I 25	46940	Remained as a C-5. Scrapped in 1956.
LS&I 11	LS&I 18	46941	Rebuilt into an SC-4 in 1930. Preserved.
LS&I 12	LS&I 19	46942	Rebuilt into an SC-4 in 1934. Preserved.
LS&I 13	LS&I 20	46943	Rebuilt into an SC-4 in 1929. Preserved.
MM&SE 38	LS&I 22	46944	Rebuilt into an SC-4 in 1929. Preserved.
MM&SE 39	LS&I 21	46945	Rebuilt into an SC-4 in 1930. Preserved.
MM&SE 40	LS&I 24	46946	Rebuilt into an SC-4 in 1930. Preserved.

Between 1928 and 1934, almost all of the C-5 class locomotives, with the exception of No. 25, were sent to the LSI's Presque Isle locomotive shops to be extensively rebuilt and modified to improve their performance. Their boilers received superheaters and were raised higher above the frame; their fireboxes were widened and received Nicholson thermic siphons; their cylinder saddles were replaced by ones with superheated cylinders and piston valves; and feedwater heaters were installed. The upgrades added to the C-5s boosted their tractive effort to around 42,000 pounds-force (187 kN), and the rebuilt locomotives were reclassified as SC-4s.

=== Revenue service ===
No. 18 was the third C-5 class 2-8-0 to be built, and it was originally numbered 11. The LS&I initially assigned No. 11 to pull mixed freight trains and occasional iron ore trains alongside the other C-5 locomotives. In its early years, due to its poor steaming capabilities, No. 11 was prone to stalling when the weight of its train exceeded its pulling power, or while the locomotive was climbing a grade. When the LS&I merged with the MM&SE in 1924, No. 11 was renumbered to No. 18. (Note: The No. 18 was previously assigned by the LS&I to an SC-1 class 2-8-0, which was subsequently renumbered to 34.) In 1930, No. 18 was rebuilt and modified as an SC-4 at the LS&I's Presque Isle shops, and its capabilities were radically improved.

Following its rebuild, No. 18 was primarily reassigned to pull logging trains on branch lines and to switch hopper cars at iron ore mines. By the end of the 1950s, No. 18 and the rest of the SC-4s remained on the LS&I's roster, being stationed in Ishpeming and Negaunee. The LS&I retired the majority of their steam fleet and replaced them with diesel locomotives to reduce operating costs, but the SC-4s, due to their reliability and appreciation by crews, remained on the roster for use in switching hopper cars and thawing frozen iron ore. In September 1962, No. 18 and the other aging SC-4s were retired from revenue service, as the LS&I discontinued their steam operations.

=== First retirement ===
By August 1963, No. 18 was one of eleven 2-8-0s to be purchased from the LS&I by the newly-formed Marquette and Huron Mountain (M&HM) tourist railroad. The M&HM's owner, John A. Zerbel, sought to use all the locomotives to pull summer tourist trains on former LS&I trackage between Marquette and a proposed resort complex in Big Bay. Only a few of the other SC-4 class locomotives (Nos. 19, 22, and 23) were used for tourist excursion service, and plans for the Big Bay resort had fallen through, following overestimated ridership. No. 18 and the rest of the M&HM's inoperable locomotives were left in storage at a nearby field during the M&HM's operating years.

In April 1984, John Zerbel died shortly before a tax deadline. Following some failed attempts to continue the M&HM's operations, the railroad was permanently closed down by the end of the year, and all remaining equipment was sold at an auction on January 14, 1985. During the auction, No. 18 and three other SC-4s (Nos. 19, 20, and 21) were sold to a scrap dealer, the Ishpeming Steel Company, for $1,200 each. Upon hearing of the scrap dealer's purchase, Art Anderson, the M&HM's former chief mechanical officer, signed a ninety-day note of $10,000 for Ishpeming Steel to prevent the locomotives from being scrapped. Wisconsin-based entrepreneur and fellow steam fan John Slack quickly agreed to help Anderson, and he purchased the four SC-4s.

John Slack made plans to use all four locomotives for a proposed tourist operation in Laona, Wisconsin—with dinner trains to avoid competing with the Lumberjack Steam Train—and No. 18 was selected to be restored to operable condition first. Slack's new company, the Lake States Steam Transportation Company (LSST), hired Gary Bensman and Steve Sandberg to work on the SC-4. The locomotive was moved in December 1986 to the Nicolet Badger Northern Railroad's (NBN) small facility in Laona, where restoration work had started. During the process, Slack's revenue business lost a major contract, and a bank stopped funding the LSST shortly thereafter.

=== Grand Canyon Railway ownership ===
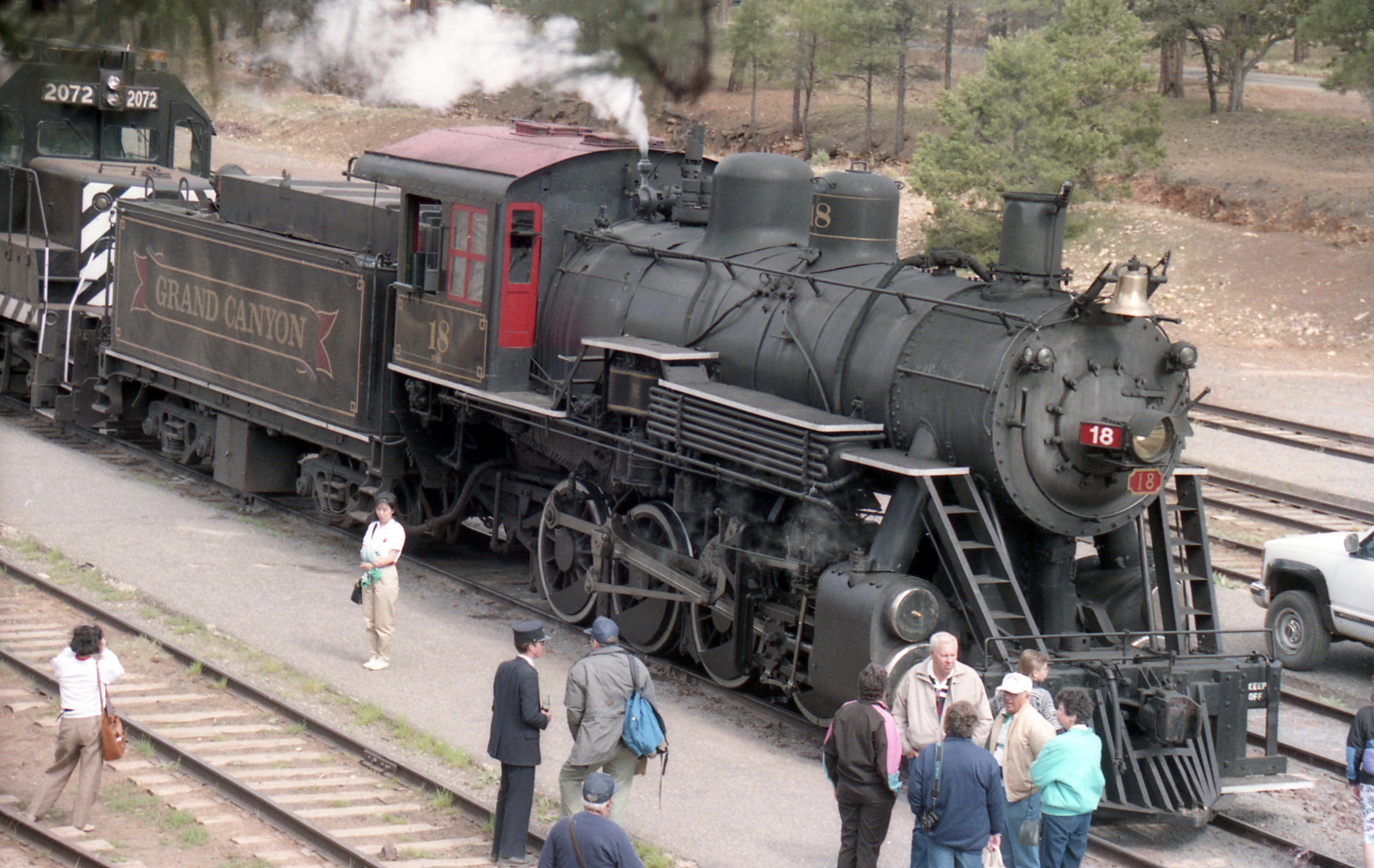
GCR No. 18 idling at the Grand Canyon Village on April 25, 1991

In the late 1980s, under the guidance of Max and Thelma Biegert, the former Santa Fe Railroad line between Williams, Arizona, and the Grand Canyon was being redeveloped into a passenger excursion operation, called the Grand Canyon Railway (GCR). Their initial goal was to launch steam train operations by April 1990, and many options were mulled, including a group of Lima-built China Railways KD7s. Gary Bensman, who had been hired as GCR's first chief mechanical officer, remembered No. 18 and entered negotiations with John Slack about GCR acquiring the locomotive, since some mechanical work had already been performed on it. Max Biegert subsequently considered pushing GCR's opening date forward to September 17, 1989—the 88th anniversary of the line's 1901 completion—with No. 18 pulling the first train. Bensman—initially estimating that the restoration process would last over one month—promised Biegert that he and other crews would make the process work, and in July 1989, GCR purchased No. 18, along with Nos. 19 and 20, from Slack.

All three locomotives were loaded onto flatcars and shipped via the Chicago and North Western (C&NW) mainline to Chicago. Following some shipping delays created during the transfer process from the C&NW to the Santa Fe, the locomotives only arrived at Williams on August 27. When No. 18 arrived, GCR crews and local subcontractors immediately began working twenty-hour shifts to have the SC-4 restored before the deadline, and sometimes, the restoration crew consisted of up to thirty people. Much time was spent patching No. 18's firebox; air brakes had to be installed; a bottom part of the tender had to be replaced; and since the locomotive had to be converted from coal to oil firing, an oil tank had to be constructed and fabricated into the tender, and some plumbing mechanisms had to be added.

In the early morning of September 17, No. 18 was fired up under GCR ownership for the first time, but some test runs had to be conducted before the locomotive could pull the inaugural train. Despite crews having to use the shut-off valve to control the water in the boiler, due to a faulty water pump and a broken injector, No. 18 pulled GCR's inaugural train during the Railway's grand reopening, as planned, and the SC-4 became the first steam locomotive to travel to the Grand Canyon since 1953. Enroute to the canyon, No. 18 suffered an overheated bearing in one of its tender trucks, and it resulted in the train arriving two hours late. Following the publicized run, No. 18 had to stay at a yard in the Grand Canyon Village for overnight repairs, and GCR's two EMD GP7 locomotives had to return the inaugural train to Williams.

The following day, No. 18 was able to pull GCR's first regular passenger train for a return run to Williams. As a result of its fast-paced restoration, No. 18 suffered multiple mechanical problems for the remainder of GCR's 1989 operating season. In January 1990, construction was completed on a shop facility in Williams with air conditioning and various necessary tools to improve working conditions for GCR's maintenance crews. No. 18 subsequently underwent a major overhaul to resolve its mechanical problems, before the locomotive returned to service on March 1. On some occasions during the 1990 operating season, No. 18 performed doubleheaders with another steam locomotive GCR had acquired and restored, Ex-LS&I SC-3 class No. 29.

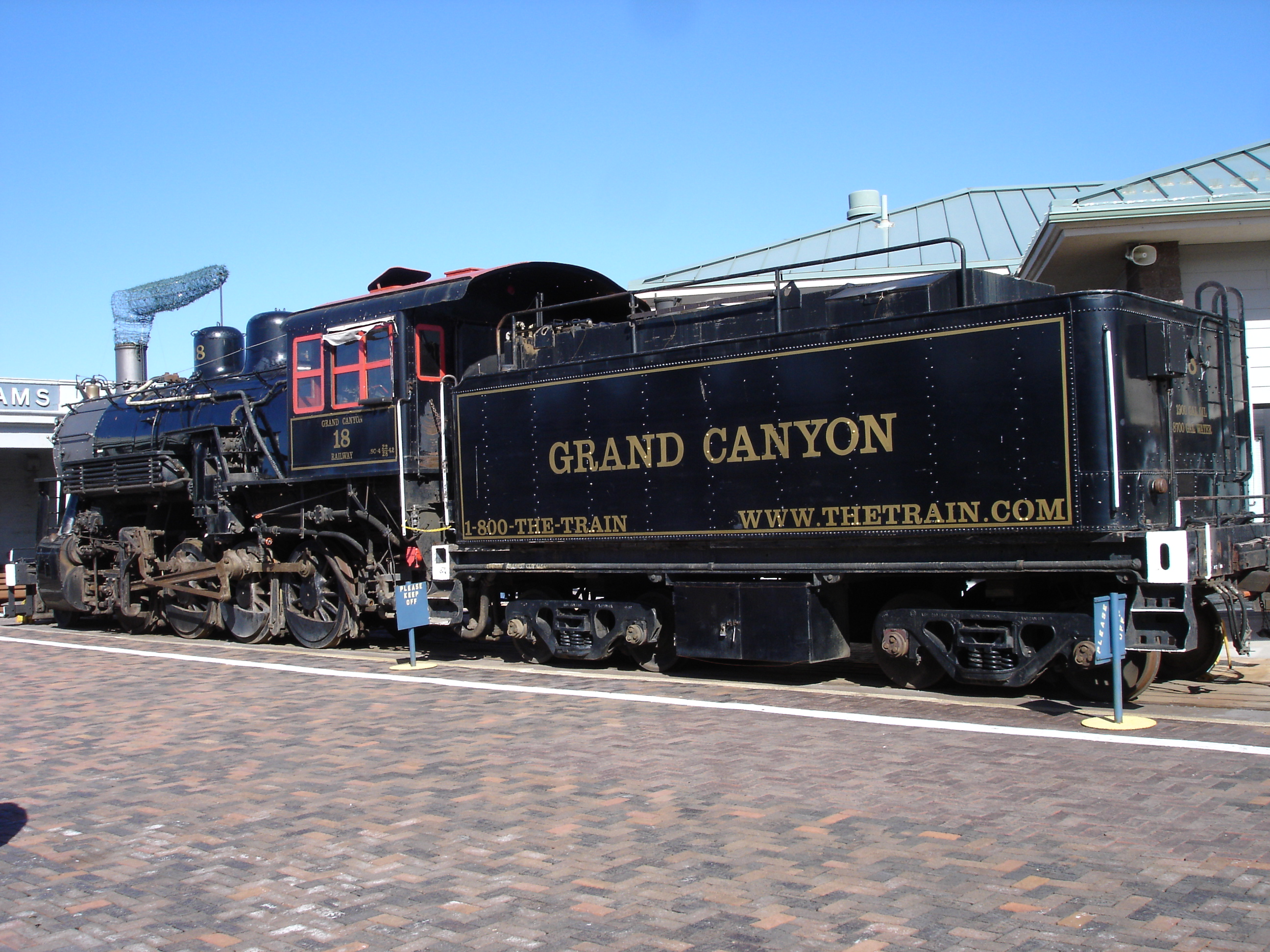
No. 18 on static display at Williams Depot, April 2006

By early 1991, GCR's management was exploring ways to increase public awareness of the railway. As a solution, between February 21 and 22, No. 18 pulled GCR's three-car Hassayampa Special on the Santa Fe's Peavine mainline from Williams to Phoenix. The locomotive was subsequently displayed for two days at the Phoenix Union Station to take part in Phoenix Union Station Days, sponsored by the National Association of Railroad Passengers. No. 18 and the special consist returned to Williams on February 26. In 1993, No. 18 was photographed in front of the GCR shops alongside No. 29 and the cosmetically-restored Nos. 20 and 19, before the latter was shipped to Las Vegas, Nevada, for display at the MGM Grand Adventures theme park.

By the mid-1990s, following the opening of a hotel and a restaurant adjacent to the Williams depot, GCR's popularity and profitability grew, but the increasing length of the railway's regular trains were exceeding No. 18's hauling capacity, which was limited to six passenger cars unassisted. The railway also reduced their yearly steam schedules as their MLW FPA-4 diesels were placed into service for the longer consists. In October 1996, the Grand Canyon Chapter of the National Railway Historical Society (NRHS) hosted an event that celebrated Ex-Burlington Route 2-8-2 No. 4960's debut on GCR, and No. 18 performed a doubleheader with No. 4960 during the occasion. In August 2002, GCR was the site of that year's NRHS Convention, and No. 18 participated in a night photo session and a photo tripleheader with No. 4960 and visiting locomotive Santa Fe 3751. In September, No. 18 had to be taken out of service to undergo its Federal Railroad Administration (FRA) 1,472-day inspection, but GCR officials decided not to return the locomotive to service, due to its low tractive effort. The SC-4 was subsequently put on display at the Williams depot, while the railway's trains continued to be pulled by Nos. 29, 4960, and their diesel roster.

=== Excursion service on the MHRR and SLRG ===
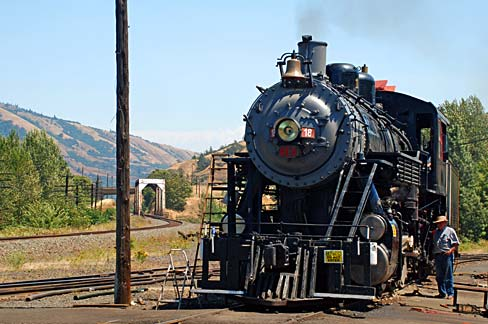
No. 18 on the Mount Hood Railroad, July 2007

By early 2007, businessman Brian Fleming had decided to operate steam excursions in the Pacific Northwest, and he originally planned to restore locomotive Spokane, Portland and Seattle 539. Fleming decided that utilizing a smaller locomotive for his operations would be a more feazible option, so he contacted GCR and asked if No. 18 was up for sale. A deal was closed in April 2007 where GCR would trade Nos. 18 and 20 in exchange for No. 539, and Fleming promised to pay for all shipping costs involved. No. 18 was scheduled to enter service for the Mount Hood Railroad (MHRR) in Oregon by July 4. While the two SC-4s were being prepared for shipment in Williams, a cutting torch started a fire on a flatcar carrying the No. 18 locomotive, but the fire was quickly extinguished.

The Union Pacific Railroad (UP) had clearance issues while routing the shipment of Nos. 18 and 20, and the shipping process consequently took over one month. On June 8, No. 18 was unloaded onto MHRR's rails, and Fleming's crews immediately began working to restore the locomotive to service; the Federal Railroad Administration (FRA) performed an internal inspection of the boiler; the tubes had to be replaced; and a June 22 hydrostatic test revealed minor leaks that needed repairs. On July 6, No. 18 underwent its first test fire under Fleming's ownership, and it performed its first test runs on the MHRR six days later. Beginning on July 18, the locomotive pulled the MHRR's tourist trains throughout the Hood River Valley. Following overestimated ridership and underestimated fuel costs, No. 18 pulled its final train for the MHRR on August 31 before it was sidelined, and the railroad discontinued steam operations.

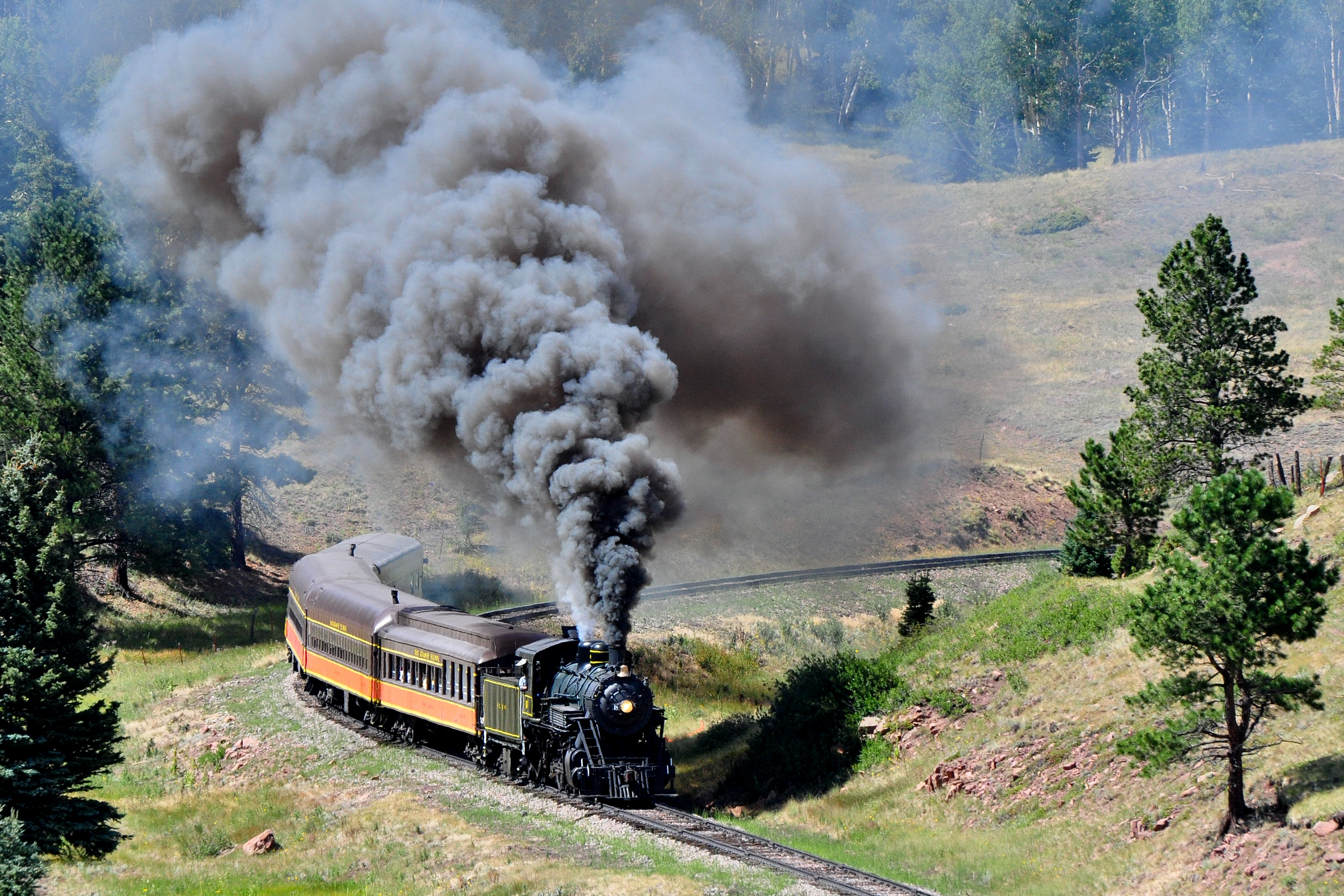
No. 18 pulling an excursion train through La Veta Pass, on August 22, 2011

Simultaneously, under the guidance of businessman Ed Ellis and his company, Iowa Pacific Holdings, the Rio Grande Scenic Railroad (RGSR) was operating tourist trains on the San Luis and Rio Grande (SLRG) freight mainline in Colorado, and the railroad utilized one steam locomotive, Southern Pacific 1744. The RGSR purchased Nos. 18 and 20 from Fleming to expand their steam fleet, and the two SC-4s were shipped again to Alamosa, Colorado in early 2008. Beginning in May, while No. 1744 began to undergo heavy boiler repairs, No. 18 pulled the RGSR's excursion and photographer trains on the SLRG's former Denver and Rio Grande Western La Veta Pass line between Alamosa and La Veta. No. 20 was also retained as a source of spare parts.

The No. 18 locomotive last operated under RGSR ownership in 2013 before it was put into storage. Within the ensuing years, Iowa Pacific Holdings and the SLRG were running into financial troubles and creating debt. In 2017, the SLRG took a $5 million loan from an investment firm in Illinois, but the company subsequently defaulted on the loan and created a $4.6 million debt. In September 2019, the SLRG filed for Chapter 11 bankruptcy, and the RGSR and all its equipment, including No. 18, were put into receivership. The SC-4 was put up for sale along with most of the company's roster via equipment dealer Ozark Mountain Railcar. No. 20 was sold in October 2020 to the city of Allen, Texas, and it was moved to their heritage center for static display.

=== Colebrookdale Railroad ===
On March 27, 2021, it was announced that No. 18 would be purchased by the Maguire Family Foundation, who also reached an agreement with the Colebrookdale Railroad (EBGX) to lease and operate it on their excursion trains. In June, the locomotive and its tender were shipped separately from Alamosa to the Colebrookdale Railroad's location in Boyertown, Pennsylvania, and crews began to work on the SC-4 inside a small building in Glasgow. No. 18's flue time expired in 2022, so its boiler requires another 1,472-day inspection before running again.

== See also ==
- Duluth and Northern Minnesota 14
- Great Smoky Mountains Railroad 1702
- Lake Superior and Ishpeming 33
- Union Pacific 618

== Bibliography ==
- Durocher, Aurele (April 1958). "The Lake Superior and Ishpeming Railroad Company". The Railway and Locomotive Historical Society Bulletin (98): 13–31. JSTOR 43520202.
- Zahrt, Chris (May 2009). "Wandering No. 18's many lives". Trains. Vol. 69, no. 5. Kalmbach Media. pp. 45–51.
- Schauer, David (2015). Lake Superior & Ishpeming Railroad In Color. Vol. 1. Scotch Plains, New Jersey: Morning Sun Books, Inc. ISBN 978-1-58248-494-5.
- Bunker, Kevin (July–August 1995). "Conserving a Legend: Arizona's Grand Canyon Railway". Locomotive & Railway Preservation. Pentrex. pp. 30–50.
- Richmond, Al (2017). The Story of Grand Canyon Railway: Cowboys, Miners, Presidents & Kings. Grand Canyon, Arizona: Grand Canyon Conservancy. ISBN 978-1-934656-91-4.
- Bianchi, Curt (May 1995). "By steam to the Grand Canyon". Trains. Vol. 55, no. 5. Kalmbach Media. pp. 40–42.
- Mitchell, Alexander (September 2019). "Thirty Years of Growth and Change: Grand Canyon Railway". Railfan & Railroad. Vol. 38, no. 9. White River Productions. pp. 52–54.
