= Southern Pacific 1744 =

Preserved SP M-6 class 2-6-0 locomotive

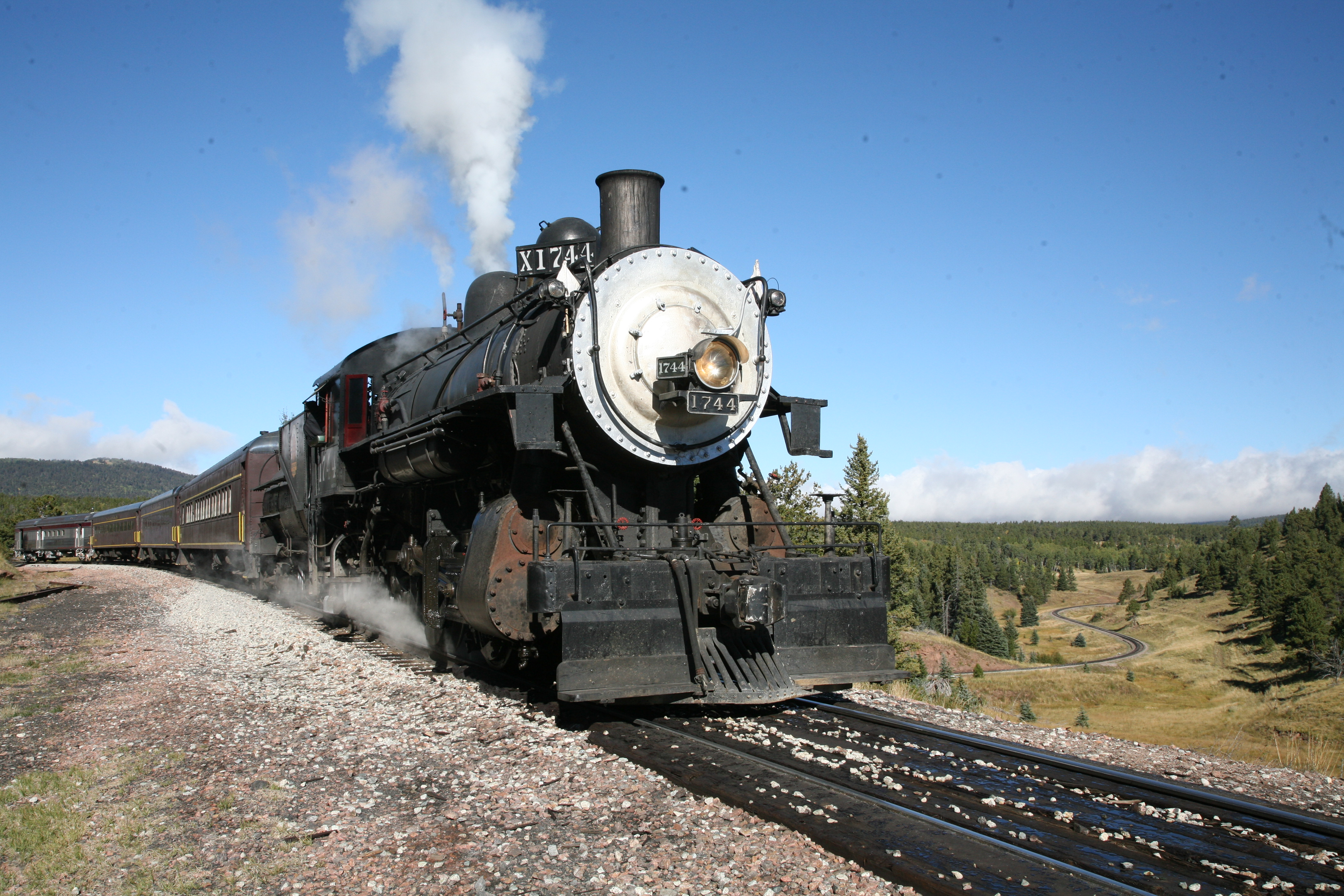
- No. 1744 hauling an excursion train on the Rio Grande Scenic Railroad on September 21, 2007
Type and origin
- Power type: Steam
- Builder: Baldwin Locomotive Works
- Serial number: 19671
- Model: M-63 21/28 150-S
- Build date: November 1901
- Rebuild date: 1912
Specifications
- Configuration
  - Whyte: 2-6-0
  - UIC: 1'C'h
- Gauge: 4 ft 8 1/2 in (1,435 mm)
- Driver dia.: 63 in (1,600 mm)
- Wheelbase: 51.29 ft (15.63 m)
  - Engine: 23.67 ft (7.21 m)
  - Drivers: 15.17 ft (4.62 m)
- Adhesive weight: 144,120 lb (65,370 kg)
- Loco weight: 166,300 lb (75,400 kg) (Pre-1912); 174,000 lb (79,000 kg) (Post-1912)
- Tender weight: 100,000 lb (45,000 kg)
- Total weight: 266,300 lb (120,800 kg) (Pre-1912); 274,000 lb (124,000 kg) (Post-1912)
- Tender type: 100-C-1
- Fuel type: New: Coal; Now: Oil
- Fuel capacity: Coal: 12 t (12 long tons; 13 short tons); Oil: 2,800 US gal (11,000 L; 2,300 imp gal)
- Water cap.: New: 6,000 US gal (23,000 L; 5,000 imp gal); Now: 10,000 US gal (38,000 L; 8,300 imp gal)
- Firebox
  - Grate area: 49.50 sq ft (4.599 m^{2})
- Boiler pressure: 200 lb (91 kg)
- Heating surface
  - Firebox: 160.32 sq ft (14.894 m^{2}) (Pre-1912); 162 sq ft (15.1 m^{2}) (Post-1912)
- Cylinders: Two, outside
- Cylinder size: 21 in × 28 in (530 mm × 710 mm) (Post-1912)
- High-pressure cylinder: 15.5 in × 28 in (390 mm × 710 mm) (Pre-1912)
- Low-pressure cylinder: 26 in × 28 in (660 mm × 710 mm) (Pre-1912)
- Valve gear: Stephenson
- Valve type: Piston valves
- Loco brake: Air
- Train brakes: Air
- Couplers: Knuckle
Performance figures
- Tractive effort: 33,320 lb (15,110 kg)
- Factor of adh.: 4.51
Career
- Operators: Southern Pacific Railroad; Heber Valley Railroad; Rio Grande Pacific Corporation; Rio Grande Scenic Railroad; Niles Canyon Railway
- Class: M-6
- Numbers: SP 1744; FW&W 1744; NO&GC 1744; SL&RG 1744
- Nicknames: Valley Mallet; The Big Easy Steam Train (By NO&GC crews)
- Retired: September 24, 1956 (revenue service); May 4, 1958 (1st excursion service); May 21, 2007 (2nd excursion service)
- Preserved: May 9, 1959
- Restored: 1957 (1st excursion service); September 1980 (2nd excursion service)
- Current owner: Pacific Locomotive Association
- Disposition: Undergoing restoration to operating condition

Southern Pacific 1744 is a preserved M-6 class 2-6-0 "Mogul" type steam locomotive, built by the Baldwin Locomotive Works (BLW) for the Southern Pacific Railroad (SP) in November 1901. Originally equipped with Vauclain compound cylinders, it was rebuilt with conventional cylinders in 1912. It operated for many years out of Oakland, California on the Southern Pacific's Western Division and in California's Central Valley where the locomotive and its classmates were fondly called "Valley Mallets" by their crews.

The locomotive was made famous in later years by pulling some of the last steam excursions on the SP alongside other steam locomotives, including 4-8-4 4460. In 1959, No. 1744 was donated to the Sons of Utah Pioneers in Corinne, Utah where it remained on static display, until 1980. That year, it was restored by New London Railroad and Village Incorporated to operate on the Heber Valley Railroad (HVRX) in Heber City for the rest of the decade.

In 1989, it was sold to Tarantula Corporation for a rebuild that never came to fruition, and it spent another decade in storage in Fort Worth, Texas. In 1999, it was sold again the Rio Grande Pacific Corporation, and it was rebuilt to operate in New Orleans, Louisiana until 2001. It was eventually sold once again to Iowa Pacific Holdings for use on the Rio Grande Scenic Railroad between Alamosa and La Veta, Colorado.

Its fourth return to service only lasted less than a year, as firebox repairs needed to be done for the locomotive. The boiler was sent to several out of state facilities for repairs, until the Rio Grande Scenic ceased operations. In March 2020, the Pacific Locomotive Association purchased No. 1744 with the hopes of bringing it back to service on the Niles Canyon Railway in Sunol, California.

== History ==
=== Construction and revenue service ===
No. 1744 was the 20th member of the M-6 class built by the Baldwin Locomotive Works and delivered to the Southern Pacific Railroad (SP) in November 1901. The locomotive and its classmates started out as Vauclain compound high-pressure locomotives, as in the turn of the 20th century, this design became very popular with various class 1 railroads, including the SP. However, the popularity was short-lived. Significant maintenance difficulties appeared, particularly with uneven forces wear on the crosshead guides.

The two cylinders were supposed to be proportioned so as to do equal work (with the low pressure being three times larger than the high); but since the steam passed between the low and high-pressure cylinder is always expanded, even before cutoff, the force produced in the low-pressure cylinder varies differently from that in the high-pressure cylinder. The complex valve assembly and the starter valve also led to increased maintenance costs, as they caused the locomotive's coal and water economy to be so good that they were also pricy to operate. As a result of this, the SP chose to rebuild all their compound Moguls between 1907 and 1914, with No. 1744 rebuilt in 1912, with conventional cylinders. Shortly afterwards, they were modified with superheated flues.

No. 1744 was mainly assigned for freight service, it operated out of Oakland on the SP Western Division and in California's Central Valley. Despite no longer being compound locomotives, the Moguls were still fondly nicknamed by their crews "Valley Mallets".

As 4-6-0s and 2-8-0s became more reliable in completing certain assignments, along with locomotives with longer wheel arrangements being introduced, the 2-6-0s were all relegated work in branch lines and rail yards across the SP system. The railroad started retiring their little moguls as early as 1928, when the first M-7s were already sold for scrap. The 2-6-0s would retire more frequently as the SP began to fully dieselize. No. 1744 was among the last steam locomotives on the railroad to be removed from revenue service, as it pulled its last revenue freight train for the SP in Sacramento on September 24, 1956.

Between 1951 and 1958, by the approval of the railroad's president Donald J. Russel, the SP used their steam locomotives for a series of "Farewell to Steam" excursions. They selected multiple steam locomotives that were still on their active roster for the fan trips, including No. 1744, 1896-built T-1 class 4-6-0 "ten wheeler" No. 2248, P-8 4-6-2 "Pacific" No. 2475, GS-4 4-8-4 No. 4443, GS-6 4-8-4 No. 4460, SP-2 4-10-2 "Southern Pacific" type No. 5011 and AC-11 4-8-8-2 Cab forward No. 4274. On May 4, 1958, No. 4460 was assigned to pull the Oakland-Sacramento Senator plus an extra string of Harriman type passenger cars for an excursion over the 34-mile Sutter-Basin branch North of Sacramento. As the train approached Davis, it was handed over to No. 1744, which pulled the train on the rest of the journey to the end of the little-used Knights Landing branch, a signpost lettered "Josephine", where until that time, there had never been a passenger train in that area. That was the last time No. 1744 was operated by the Southern Pacific, before its fire was dropped one last time.

On April 18, 1959, the Southern Pacific donated No. 1744 to the Sons of Utah Pioneers, and the locomotive was moved to their grounds in Corinne, Utah on May 9, where it remained on static display for the next twenty-one years.

=== Heber Valley Railroad excursion service ===
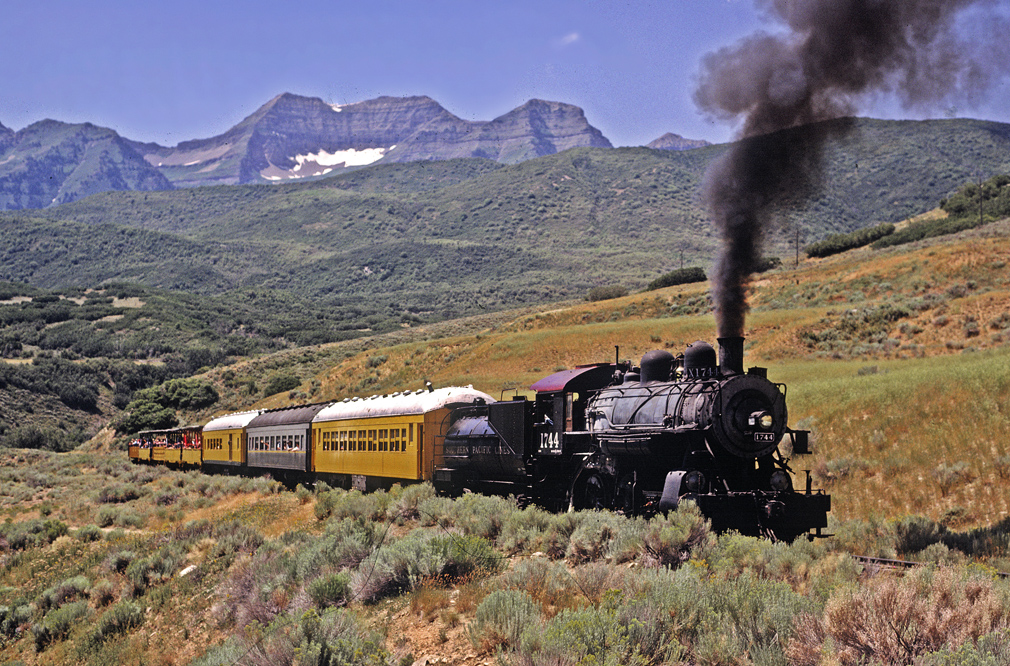
No. 1744 when it operated on the Heber Creeper, 1982

On April 22, 1980, No. 1744 was purchased by the New London and Village Incorporation, and it was moved by truck to Heber City, where it was given a major rebuild in the locomotive shops. In the Labor Day weekend of that year, No. 1744 was back under steam and was ready to operate on the Heber Creeper Tourist Railroad (HVRX). There, No. 1744 would operate alongside some other active steam locomotives, including Union Pacific 2-8-0 No. 618, Sierra Railway 2-8-2 "Mikado" No. 36, and Santa Maria Valley 2-8-2 No. 100. No. 1744 would also perform some famous doubleheaders with the other locomotives, which would also only happen on Labor Day weekends. As the decade progressed, however, the Heber Creeper was running into some financial trouble, and they slowly struggled to operate any more trains. No. 1744 made its last run in Heber on December 3, 1989, when it pulled the Santa Claus Express, and its fire was dropped once again and put into storage.

Citizens in the Heber area successfully petitioned the State of Utah to help save the railroad, leading to the creation of the Heber Valley Historic Railroad Authority in the early 1990s. By that time, however, No. 1744 was auctioned off to Tarantula Corporation. It was moved by truck to Ogden, and then moved by rail East-bound to Fort Worth, Texas, where it was re-lettered Fort Worth and Western (FWWR). There were plans to operate the locomotive to pull the FWWR's Tarantula excursion trains. However, such plans have fallen through, and No. 1744 instead spent the rest of the decade in storage at Fort Worth.

On May 21, 1999, No. 1744 was sold to the Rio Grande Pacific Corporation (RGP), who gave it a thorough overhaul beginning in January 2000 at a combined purchase and rebuild cost of $1.3 million. No. 1744 was test fired and returned to service, operating over FWWR trackage on September 9, 2000, and throughout the rest of the month, it was used for various test runs while pulling passenger cars, until it was approved to operate by the Federal Railroad Administration (FRA) on September 30. It was subsequently moved via flatcar to New Orleans, Louisiana in November of that year.

=== NO&GC stewardship ===
The Locomotive made its official inaugural run the following month for the Burlington Rock Island Historical Society, and subsequently, it started pulling regular weekend passenger trains between Belle Chasse and Gretna on one of the RGP's subsidiaries, the New Orleans and Gulf Coast Railway (NOGC). With no way to turn the locomotive each run, No. 1744 would operate forwards to Gretna, and one or two EMD FP10 diesel units would pull the train back to Belle Chasse with No. 1744 pushing the train tender-first. As the only steam locomotive to operate on that line, the locomotive was earned the nickname "The Big Easy Steam Train". May 12, 2001 was the last day No. 1744 operated under RGP ownership, and as patronage was downgraded, the locomotive was again put into storage in New Orleans for the next six years. It was undamaged in spite of Hurricane Katrina in 2005.

=== SL&RG service ===
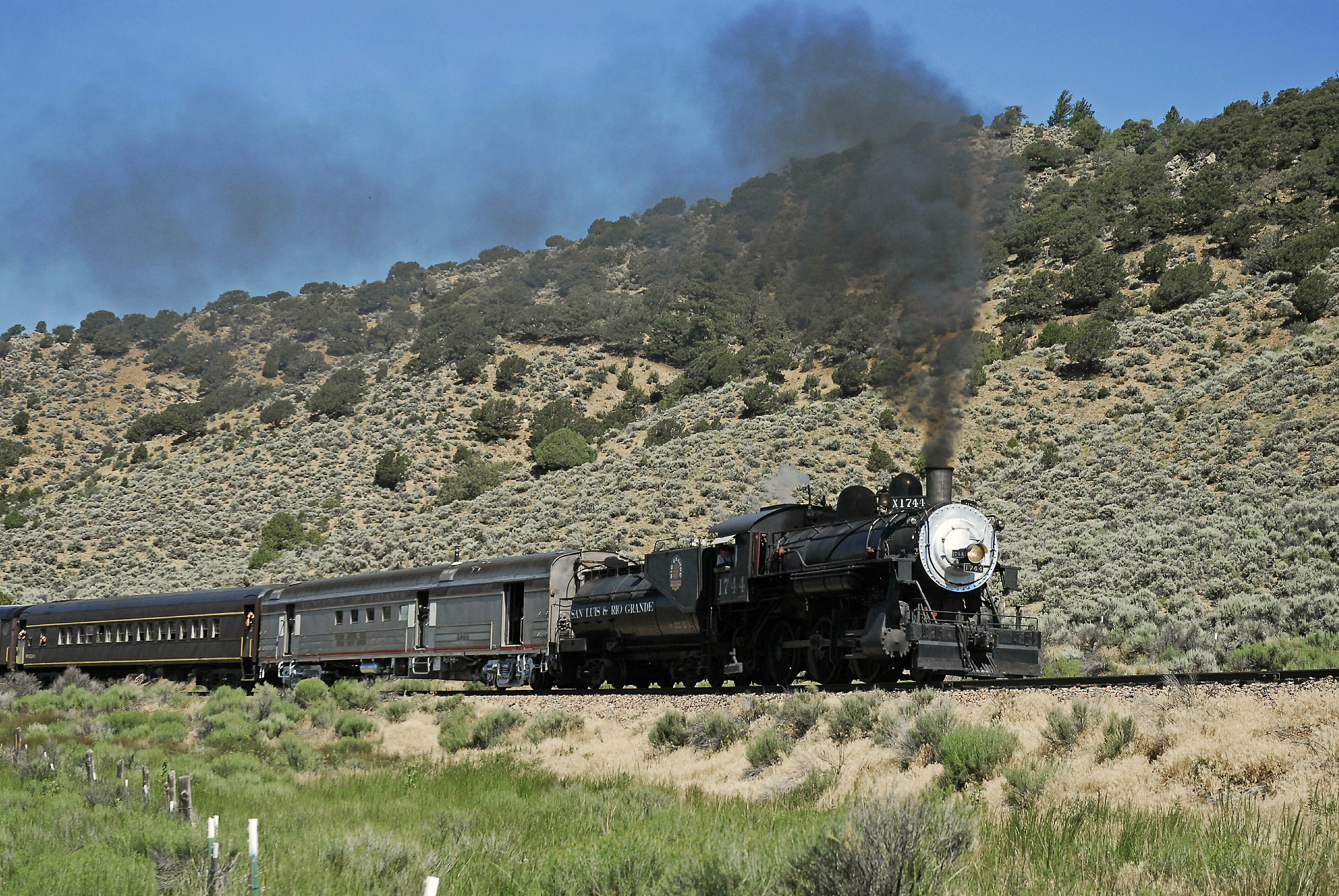
No. 1744 climbing to Sierra in Forbes Park, 2007

On March 21, 2007, No. 1744 was purchased by Iowa Pacific Holdings (IPH), which owned and operated the newly opened Rio Grande Scenic Railroad (RGSR) that operated on San Luis and Rio Grande (SL&RG) trackage. On May 9 of the same year, No. 1744 was moved to Alamosa, Colorado, where it was rebuilt and returned to service again, it operated on a test run pulling ten loaded boxcars thirteen days later on May 22. Beginning on May 25, the locomotive pulled excursion trains on the Scenic line between Alamosa and La Veta, and it would also often travel South-bound to Antonito where passengers could connect with the 3-foot gauge Cumbres and Toltec Scenic Railroad.

No. 1744 would only operate on the SL&RG for four months, before its fire was again dropped. This time, it was due to the fact its firebox was in need of extensive repairs. In the beginning of 2008, disassembly began within the Alamosa yard, and with No. 1744 out of service again, IPH chose to acquire another operable steam locomotive for the trips: Ex-Lake Superior and Ishpeming 2-8-0 18, a 1910-built locomotive.

Soon, No. 1744's boiler was separated from the frame, and it was shipped to Historic Machinery Services Corporation in Springville, Alabama with the hopes of having it repaired. In 2012, the corporation's owner was retired, and the unfinished boiler was moved to the Rusk Palestine and Pacific Railroad, better known as the Texas State Railroad (TSR), in Rusk, Texas, which owns a steam shop capable of full repairs. Some parts for boiler repairs were also being fabricated by crews from the Strasburg Rail Road (SRC) of Strasburg, Pennsylvania.

As the 2010s progressed, the boiler was shipped back to Alamosa, as the RGSR was starting to run into some financial trouble to the point where they could no longer afford to operate or maintain steam locomotives. One of the final straws to the RGSR's struggle was a wildfire that badly damaged the Fir Concert Grounds. The railroad ceased all tourist train operations as IPH filed for bankruptcy by the end of 2020. No. 1744 would be put up for sale on Ozark Mountain Railcar along with No. 18, and other locomotives and rolling stock, as well as the SL&RG trackage.

=== Niles Canyon Railway ownership ===
On March 9, 2020, it was announced that No. 1744 would be purchased by the Pacific Locomotive Association, with the hopes of finishing its restoration to operate it on the Niles Canyon Railway (NCRY), which lies on the last leg of the Transcontinental Railroad. Crews of the SL&RG began to help move the separated components of the locomotive West-bound to Brightside. The same day the acquirement was announced, the tender and cab arrived at the NCRY's facility at Brightside, California, and the tender was placed on the rails. On August 31, the frame and running gear also made it to the NCRY by truck. As of 2023, the boiler is being rebuilt with a new rear flue sheet and a new crown sheet at Stockton Locomotive Works, and the driving wheels have been repaired at the California State Railroad Museum’s (CSRM) locomotive shop in Sacramento.

== Appearances in media ==
- One year after No. 1744 was retired from the SP, it was seen pulling a passenger train in the opening credits, as well as multiple other scenes, in the 1959 feature film This Earth Is Mine, starring Rock Hudson, Jean Simmons, Dorothy McGuire, Claude Rains, and directed by Henry King.

== See also ==
- Southern Pacific 1673
- Southern Pacific 2467
- Southern Pacific 2472
- Southern Pacific 745
- Southern Pine Lumber Co. 28
- St. Louis Southwestern 336
- Canadian National 89
