= Colorado Pacific Rio Grande Railroad =

Short line railroad in Colorado, U.S.

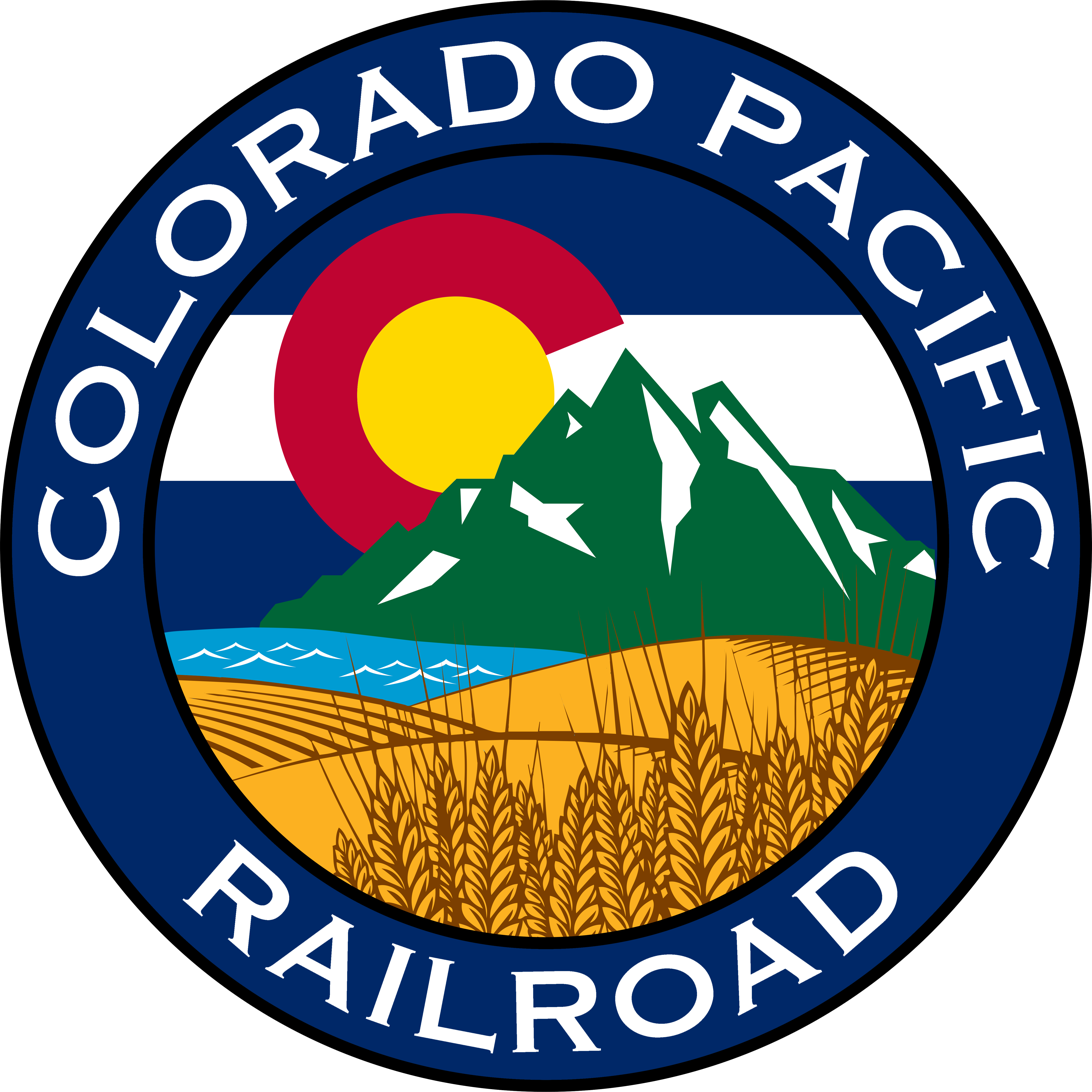

Overview
- Parent company: The Soloviev Group
- Headquarters: Alamosa, Colorado
- Reporting mark: CXRG
- Locale: Colorado
- Dates of operation: 2003–present
- Predecessor: Denver & Rio Grande Western, Southern Pacific, Union Pacific

Technical
- Track gauge: 4 ft 8 1/2 in (1,435 mm) standard gauge
- Length: 167 miles (269 kilometres)

Other
- Website: https://cxrgrr.com/

The Colorado Pacific Rio Grande Railroad (formerly the San Luis & Rio Grande Railroad) is a class III railroad operating in south-central Colorado. It runs on 154 miles (248 km) of former Denver and Rio Grande Western Railroad tracks on three lines radiating from Alamosa and interchanges with the railroads BNSF and Union Pacific in Walsenburg. Much of the railroad is located in the San Luis Valley. In 2022, it was purchased by Stefan Soloviev.

== History ==
The oldest predecessor of the railroad was the Denver and Rio Grande Railroad, which was chartered in 1870. The line over La Veta Pass to Alamosa and Antonito was originally envisioned as part of an ambitious and never-realized narrow gauge line linking Denver with Mexico City. The narrow gauge tracks crossed the pass in 1877 and reached Alamosa on July 6, 1878. The railroad was pushed on to Antonito by 1880 and ultimately to Santa Fe and Silverton. The D&RG built west from Alamosa, completing the line to South Fork and its terminus at Creede in 1881.

By the late 1880s, the inherent isolation of narrow gauge railroads from the national network began to put them at a competitive disadvantage. The D&RG converted the La Veta Pass and the Creede lines to standard gauge around 1900. The line to Antonito was also converted to standard gauge, but a third rail, laid to three-foot gauge, remained to Alamosa until the end of regular narrow gauge operation in 1968. Coincident with the conversion to standard gauge, the D&RG relocated the La Veta Pass route southward to Veta Pass in order to lower the summit, straighten curves, and reduce grades.

In 1908, the D&RG was consolidated with the Rio Grande Western to form the Denver and Rio Grande Western. In 1988, the DRGW merged with the Southern Pacific Railroad; the Union Pacific Railroad purchased and merged the SP in 1996. In June 2003, the UP sold the Walsenburg - Alamosa line and its other lines in the San Luis Valley to shortline railroad conglomerate RailAmerica. The Derrick - Creede line, which had been out of service, was sold to the Denver and Rio Grande Historical Foundation as a tourist line. RailAmerica sold the San Luis and Rio Grande Railroad (SLRG) to Iowa Pacific Holdings (IPH) in December 2005.

=== Iowa Pacific Bankruptcy ===
Iowa Pacific Holdings and its subsidiaries suffered severe financial troubles and were generating large debts. In 2017, both the SLRG and one other IPH subsidiary, the Oregon-based Mount Hood Railroad (MHRR), loaned $5 million from Big Shoulders Capital, an Illinois-based investment firm, but the two railroads defaulted on the loan, consequently owing the firm $4.6 million in debt. Under IPH ownership, both companies were also prone to substantial claims by the IRS.

In September 2019, the SLRG and MHRR were both forced into Chapter 11 bankruptcy, and the two companies were appointed a trustee, Novo Advisors, by a U.S. bankruptcy court in Denver. Between 2020 and 2021, the trustee maintained the SLRG's freight operations and spent $1.3 million rehabilitating parts of the line and another $250,000 cleaning up the railyard in Alamosa. Throughout the bankruptcy proceedings, the railroad was operated by the trustee, with various pieces of rolling stock put up for sale.

=== Soloviev Group ownership ===
On September 12, 2022, Denver-based railroad holding company OmniTRAX announced it would purchase the SLRG at a cost of $5.7 million. This raised concern among some local citizens who cited OmniTRAX's recent history of abandoning lines it couldn't make profitable, and from trails advocates who worried OmniTRAX would not let them expand trail networks among the railroad's right-of-way.

Two new bids for the railroad followed in November 2022, one from one of the SLRG's largest creditor and the other from Stefan Soloviev. On November 17, 2022, Soloviev's final bid of $10.7 million was selected by the bankruptcy trust. The bankruptcy judge approved the sale, which will become effective upon Surface Transportation Board approval.

Under Soloviev ownership, many changes are being planned, with new locomotives being brought in, track rehabilitation, and future railroad expansion. A total of 6 ex-BNSF SD70MACs have been acquired from BUGX, and 1 GP40-2 from the Royal Gorge Route Railroad, as of August 2023.

On August 23, 2024, a filing with the Surface Transportation Board (Docket No. FD 36795) revealed that Colorado Pacific San Luis would be purchasing the San Luis Central Railroad, a 13-mile agricultural short line that connects to the CXRG tracks at Monte Vista.

== Operations ==
=== Trackage ===
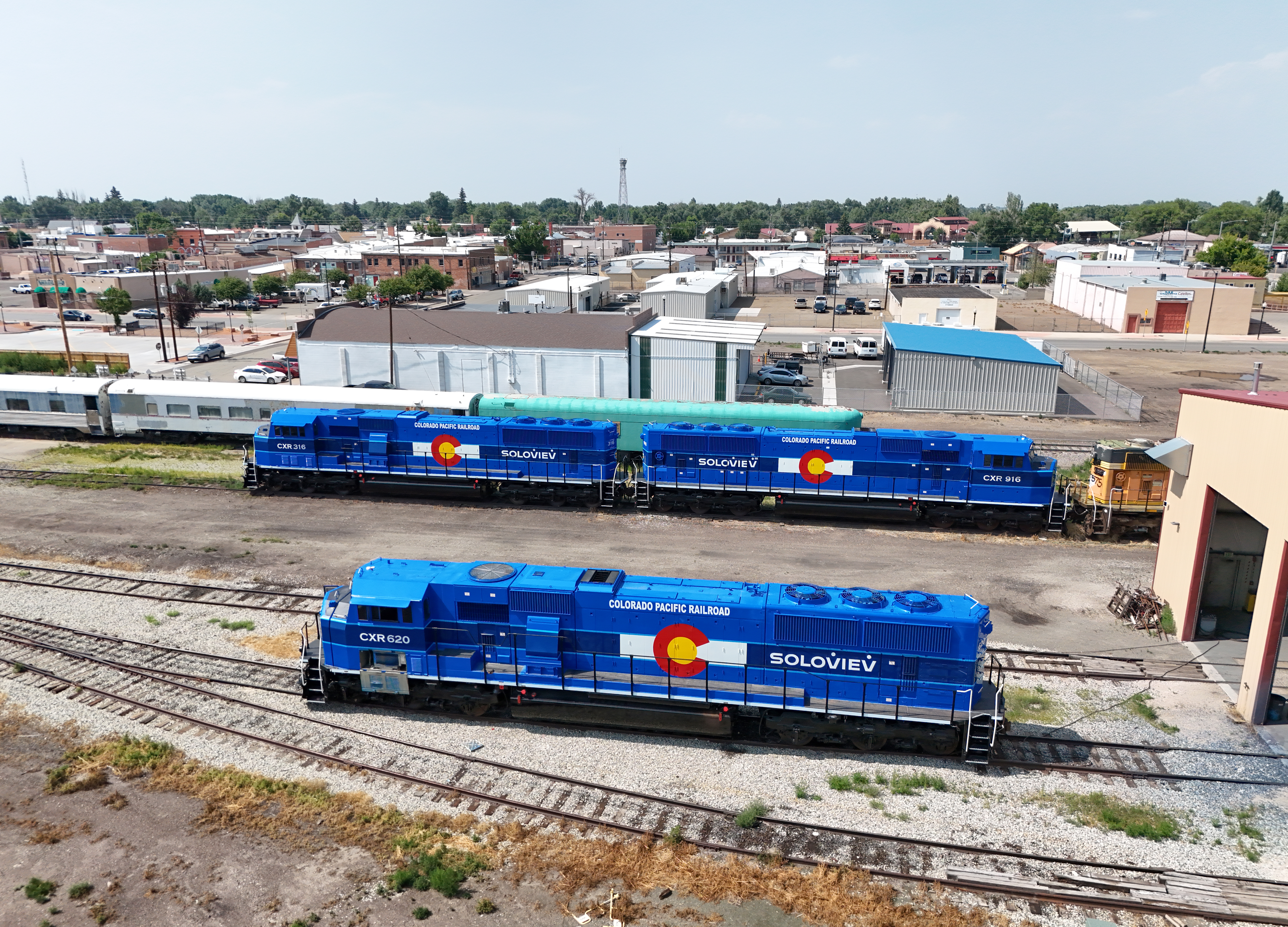
CXRG locomotives parked in Alamosa, CO

The railroad operates on 154 miles of track.

- Alamosa east to Walsenburg (over Veta Pass), where it connects with the Union Pacific Railroad and BNSF Railway.
- Alamosa south to Antonito, where it meets the narrow gauge Cumbres and Toltec Scenic Railroad.
- Alamosa west to South Fork. It meets the Colorado Pacific San Luis Railroad on this branch.

=== Heritage railroad ===
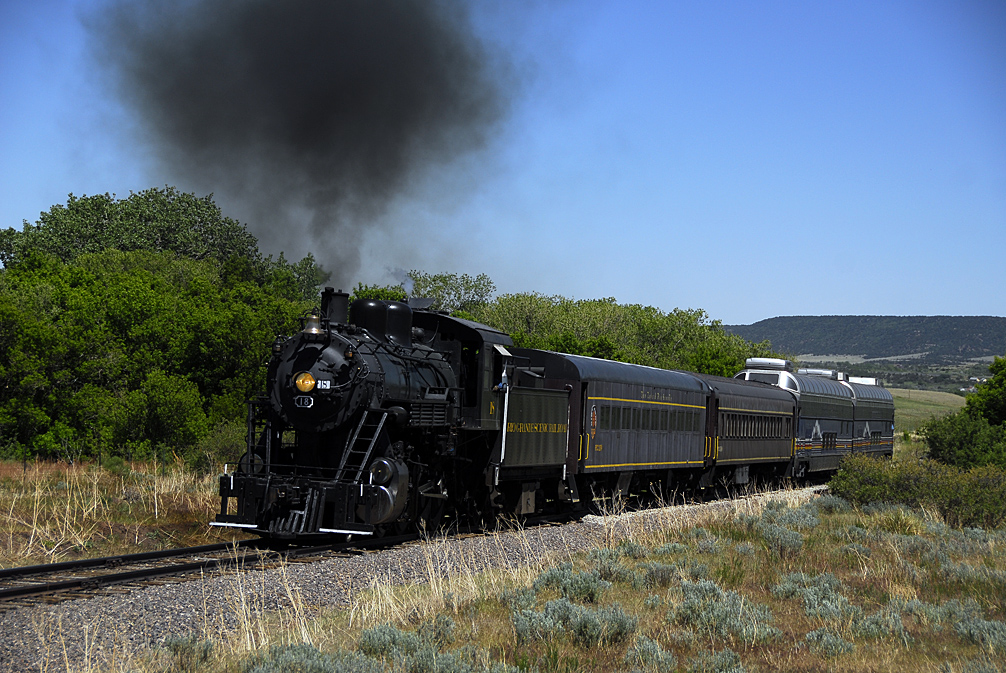
SLRG excursion train pulled by Ex-LS&I 18, climbing out of La Veta, Colorado, 2008.

A subsidiary heritage railroad, the Rio Grande Scenic Railroad, operated passenger excursion trains between Alamosa and La Veta during the summer months from 2006 to 2019. They also offered trips from Alamosa to Antonito, where passengers could connect with the narrow gauge Cumbres and Toltec.

These lines were freight only for decades under the previous railroad owners, making it popular with railroad enthusiasts who log rare mileage. The route over Veta Pass offered historic views inaccessible by road, and outdoor events were held at the Fir Concert Grounds near highest point on the railroad.

Between 2007 and 2013, the fan trips would often be pulled by a steam locomotive. First, there was Ex-Southern Pacific 2-6-0 “Mogul” type No. 1744, but it was taken out of service quickly due to firebox issues. The only other steam locomotive that operated on the SLRG was Ex-Lake Superior and Ishpeming 2-8-0 “consolidation” type No. 18.

SLRG discontinued the passenger excursions in 2019 following a wildfire that damaged the Fir Concert Grounds, and then later when the railroad entered bankruptcy and began liquidating unnecessary assets. This liquidation involved the sale of locomotives and rolling stock to the Colebrookdale Railroad and the Reading Blue Mountain and Northern Railroad in Pennsylvania.

== Gallery ==
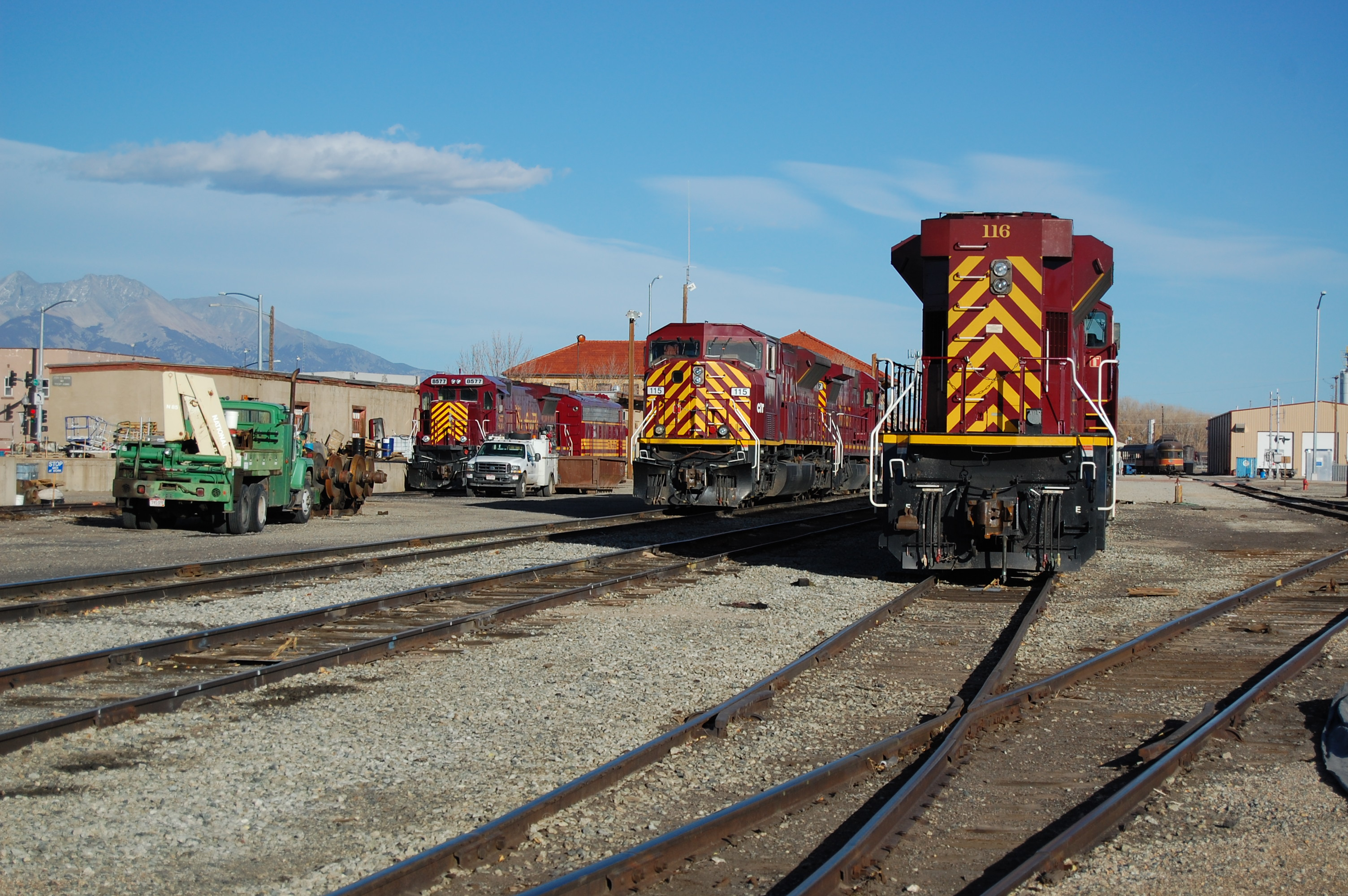
SLRG yard in Alamosa on October 23, 2012

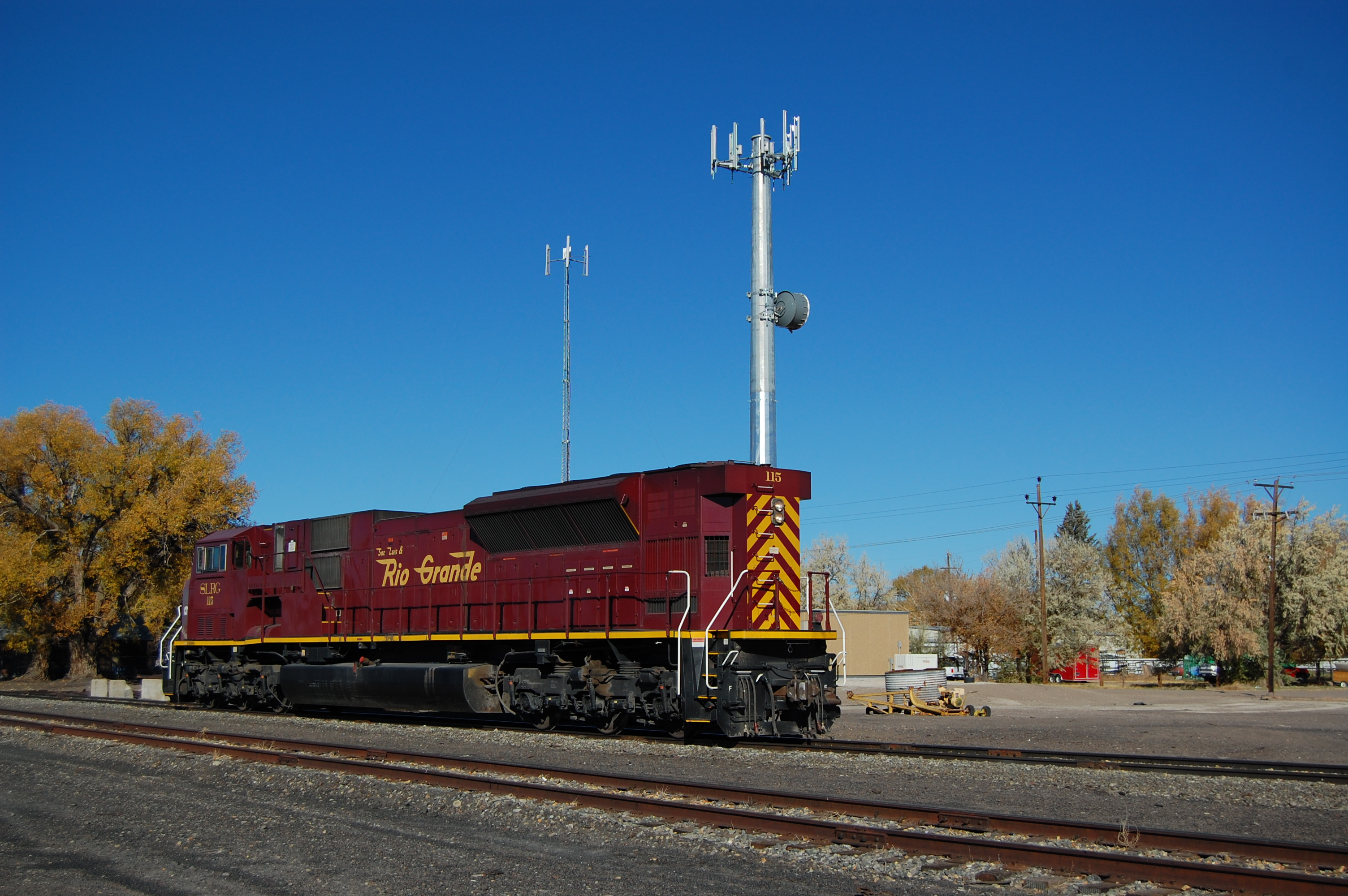
Diesel engine SLRG #115 in Alamosa on October 22, 2012

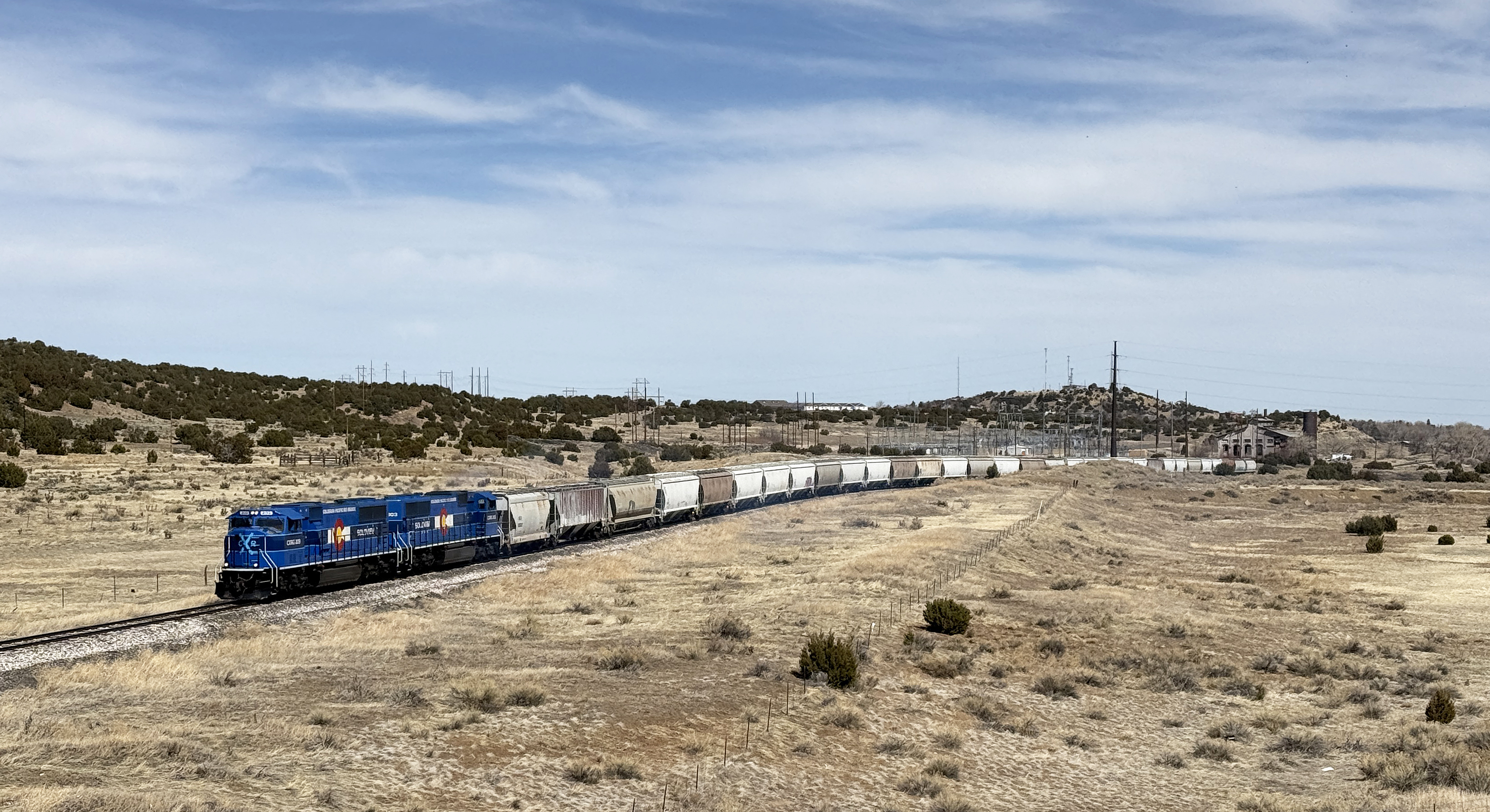
CXRG train departing Walsenburg on March 11, 2025

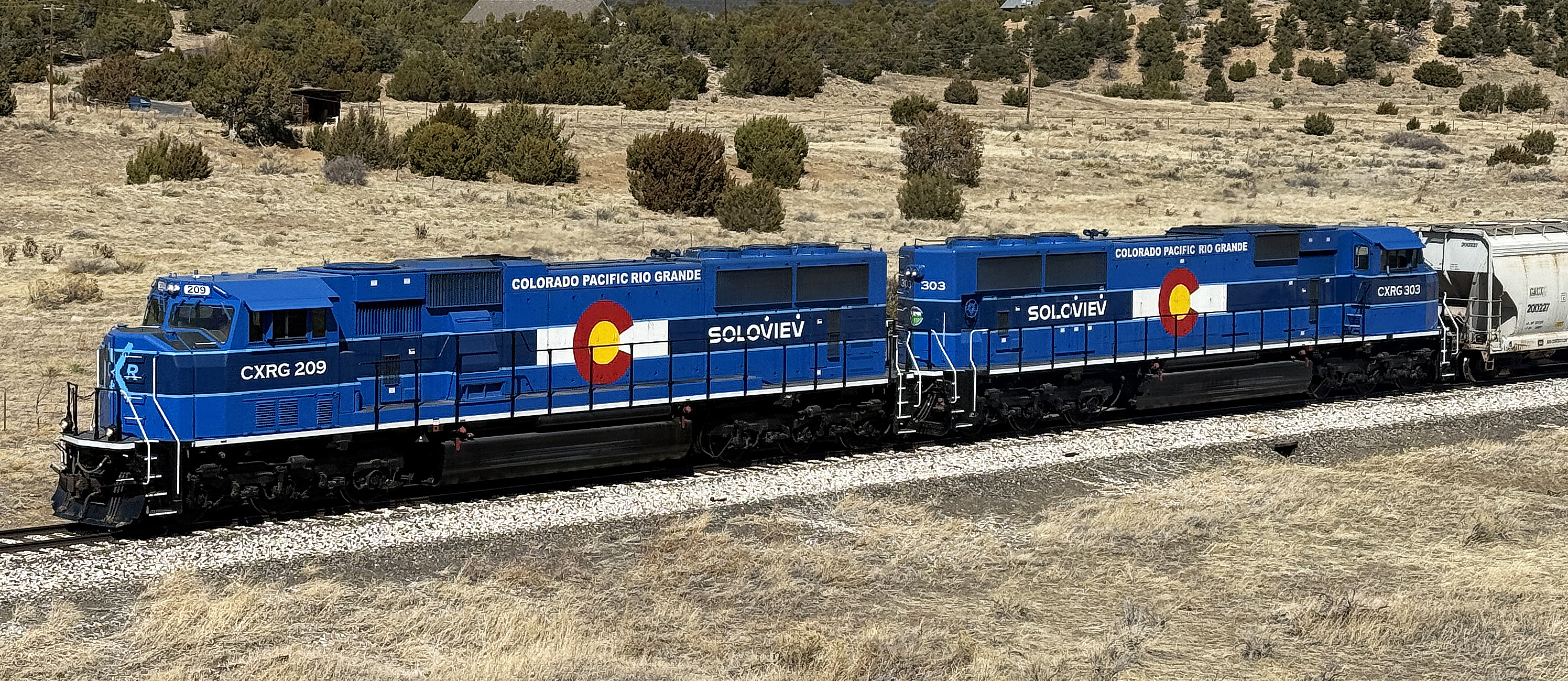
CXRG locomotives 209 and 303 running near Walsenburg on March 11, 2025
