= Rio Grande Scenic Railroad =

Train line in Colorado and New Mexico

Coordinates: 37°28′00″N 105°51′54″W

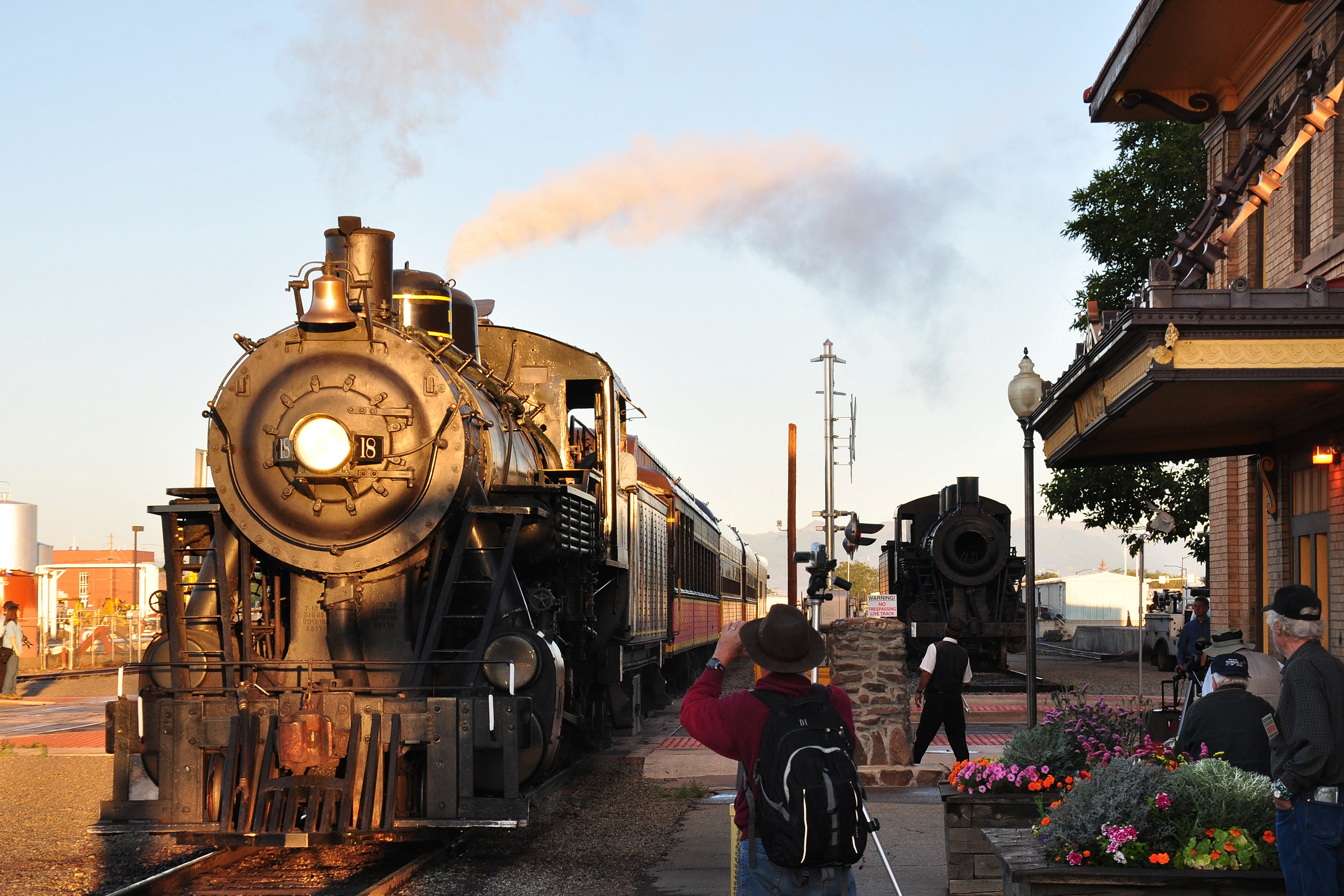
- No. 18, sitting at Alamosa station on August 22, 2011

Commercial operations
- Name: Denver and Rio Grande Western Railroad
- Built by: Denver and Rio Grande Railway
- Original gauge: 3 ft (914 mm); After 1899: 4 ft 8 1/2 in (1,435 mm) standard gauge

Preserved operations
- Owned by: San Luis and Rio Grande Railroad; Iowa Pacific Holdings
- Operated by: Rio Grande Scenic Railroad
- Reporting mark: RSGR
- Stations: Alamosa, Fort Garland, Fir Summit, La Veta
- Length: 62 mi (100 km)
- Preserved gauge: 4 ft 8 1/2 in (1,435 mm)

Commercial history
- Opened: 1878
- 1899: Gauge conversion and name change
- Closed to passengers: (?)
- Closed: (?)

Preservation history
- 2006: Opened
- 2019: Ceased operations

Website
- www.coloradotrain.com

The Rio Grande Scenic Railroad (reporting mark RSGR) of Colorado was a heritage railway that operated from 2006 to 2019 in and around the San Luis Valley as a subsidiary of the San Luis and Rio Grande Railroad. The heritage railroad ceased operating excursions following a wildfire that damaged some of their facilities, as well as the parent company SLRG entering Chapter 11 bankruptcy in late 2019.

== History ==
The Denver and Rio Grande Railroad was chartered in 1870. The line over La Veta Pass to Alamosa and Antonito was originally envisioned as part of an ambitious and never-realized narrow gauge line linking Denver with Mexico City. The narrow gauge tracks crossed the pass in 1877 and reached Alamosa on July 6, 1878. The railroad was pushed on to Antonito by 1880 and ultimately to Santa Fe and Silverton. The D&RG built west from Alamosa, completing the line to South Fork and its terminus at Creede in 1881. The D&RG converted the La Veta Pass and the Creede lines to standard gauge around 1900. The line to Antonito was also converted to standard gauge, but a third rail, laid to three-foot gauge, remained to Alamosa until the end of regular narrow gauge operation in 1968. Coincident with the conversion to standard gauge, the D&RG realigned the route over La Veta Pass to lower the summit, straighten curves, and reduce grades.

In 1908, the D&RG was consolidated with the Rio Grande Western to form the Denver and Rio Grande Western. In 1988, the DRGW merged with the Southern Pacific Railroad; the Union Pacific Railroad purchased and merged the SP in 1996. In June 2003, the UP sold the Walsenburg – Alamosa line and its other lines in the San Luis Valley to shortline railroad conglomerate RailAmerica. RailAmerica sold the SLRG to Iowa Pacific Holdings in December 2005.

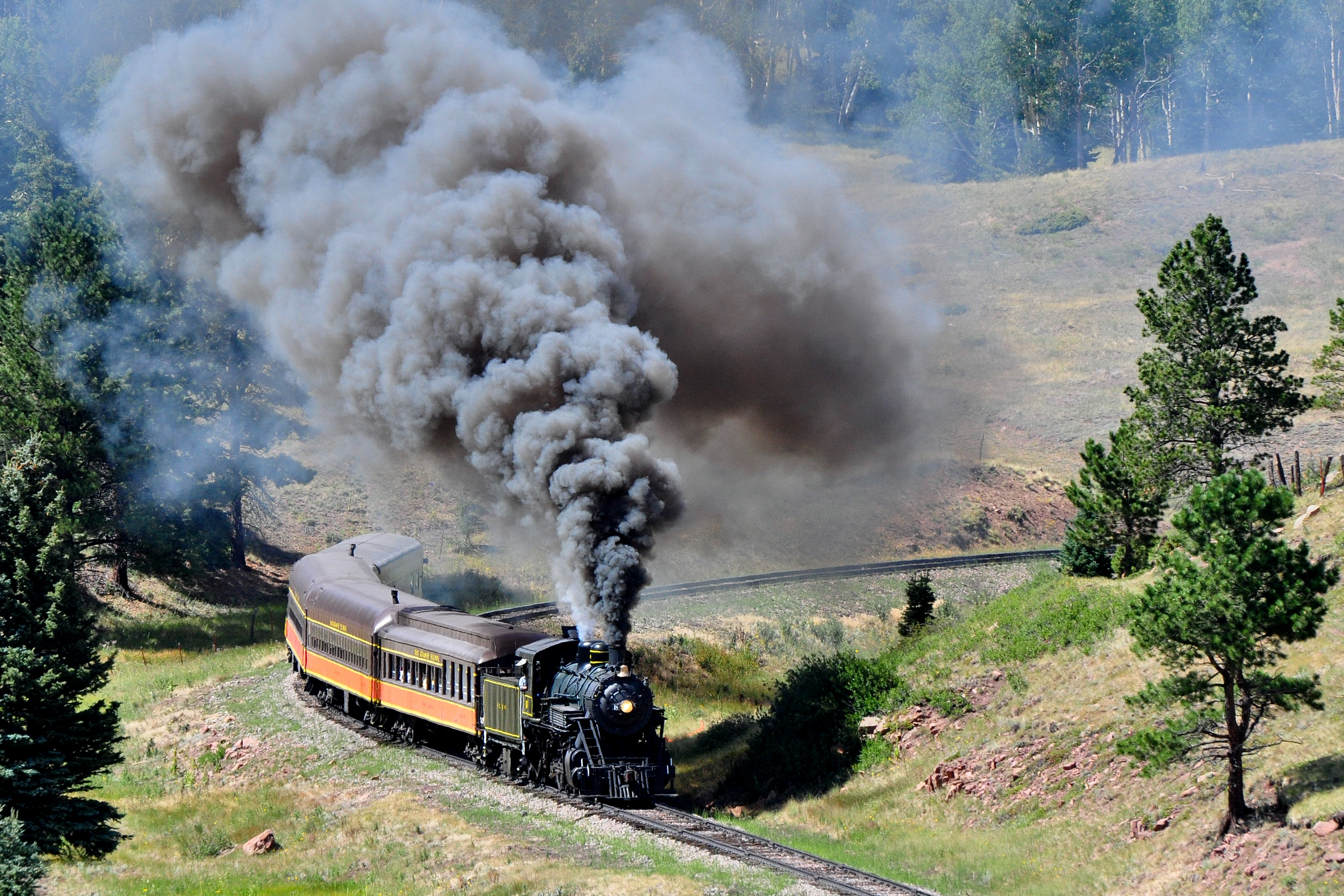
No. 18 pulling an excursion train through La Veta Pass, on August 22, 2011

Iowa Pacific established the Rio Grande Scenic Railroad in 2006. Trains operated over the Sangre de Cristo Mountains via Veta Pass and from Alamosa to Antonito, where passengers could connect with the narrow gauge Cumbres and Toltec.

Between 2007 and 2013, the fan trips would often be pulled by a steam locomotive. First, there was Ex-Southern Pacific 2-6-0 "Mogul" type No. 1744, but it was taken out of service quickly due to firebox issues. The only other steam locomotive that operated on the SLRG was Ex-Lake Superior and Ishpeming 2-8-0 "Consolidation" type No. 18.

The Fir Concert Series featured many well-known musical acts. Popular western music singer/songwriter Syd Masters and Michael Murphy appeared on the stage more than any other performers. Great players such as The Nitty Gritty Dirt Band, Ricky Skaggs, Asleep at the Wheel and Riders in the Sky also made the journey up the mountain to play live music. The San Luis and Rio Grande Railroad discontinued the passenger excursions in 2019 following a wildfire that damaged the Fir Concert Grounds, and then later when the railroad entered bankruptcy and began liquidating unnecessary assets. This liquidation involved the sale of locomotives and rolling stock to the Colebrookdale Railroad and the Reading Blue Mountain and Northern Railroad in Pennsylvania.

== Special events ==
The Rio Grande Scenic operated a variety of special events, including Mother's Day Brunch in the dome cars, Rails & Ales Brewfest, Jazz on the Tracks mountain concerts, Oktoberfest, fall foliage and pumpkin patch rides; and the Train to Christmas Town.

== Locomotives ==
Locomotive details
Number	Image	Type	Model	Built	Builder	Owner
18		Steam	2-8-0	1910	American Locomotive Company	The Maguire Family Foundation
20		Steam	2-8-0	1910	American Locomotive Company	City of Allen, Texas
1744		Steam	2-6-0	1901	Baldwin Locomotive Works	Niles Canyon Railway
115		Diesel	SD90MAC	1999	Electro-Motive Diesel	Canadian Equipment Finance
453		Diesel	F40M-2F	1981	Electro-Motive Diesel	Unknown
455		Diesel	F40M-2F	1977	Electro-Motive Diesel	Belt Railway of Chicago
459		Diesel	F40M-2F	1977	Electro-Motive Diesel	Bruggere and Monson Railroad
518		Diesel	E8	1953	Electro-Motive Diesel	Larry's Truck and Electric
1100		Diesel	FP10	1946	Electro-Motive Diesel	Bruggere and Monson Railroad
8527		Diesel	B39-8E	1987	Electro-Motive Diesel	Huntsville and Madison County Railroad Authority
8542		Diesel	B39-8E	1987	Electro-Motive Diesel	Unknown
8577		Diesel	B39-8E	1988	Electro-Motive Diesel	Vista Sand

== See also ==
- List of Colorado historic railroads
- List of heritage railroads in Colorado
