= La Veta Pass =

Mountain pass in Colorado, USA

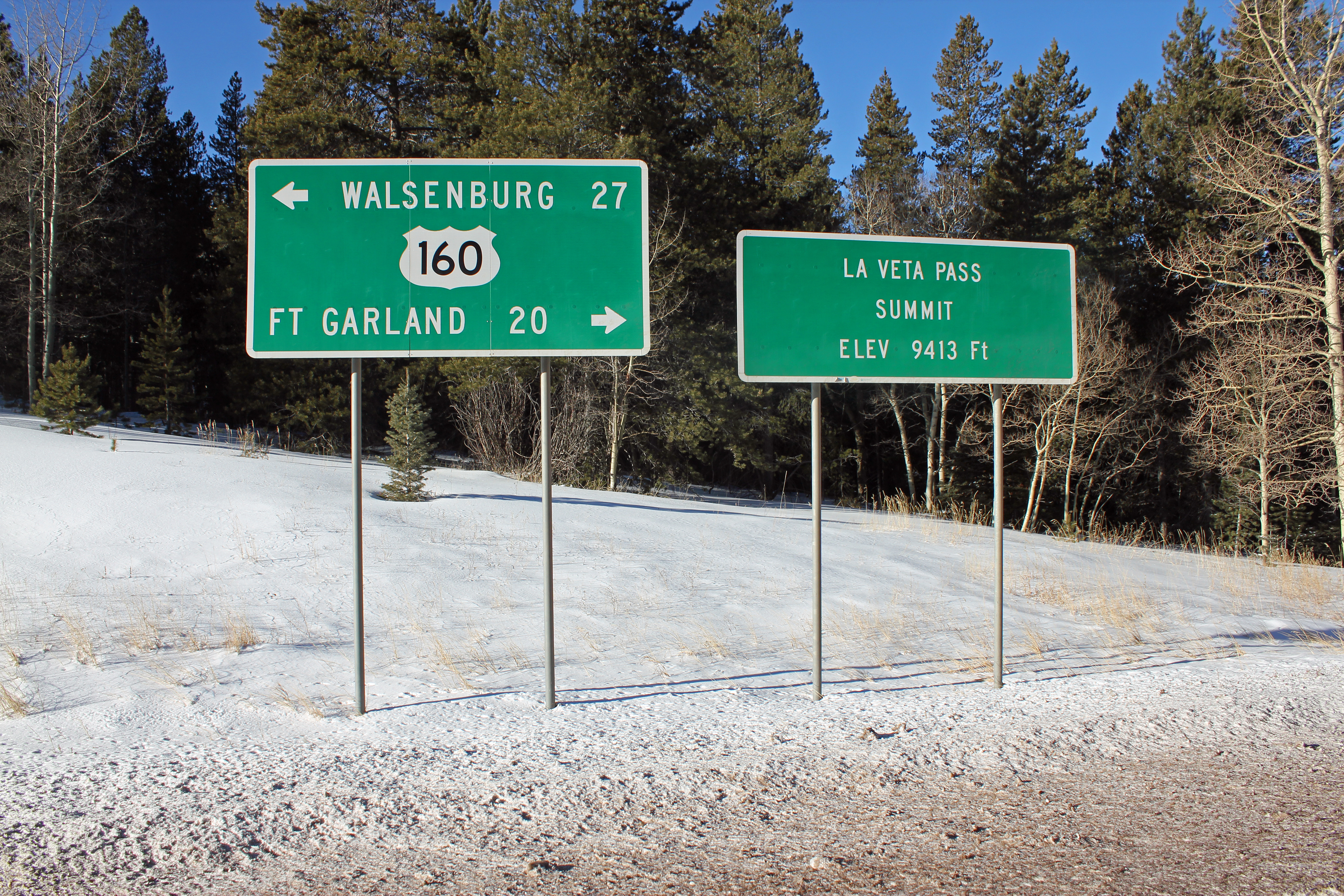
- Two signs on the south side of the pass.
- Interactive map of La Veta Pass
- Elevation: 9,413 ft (2,869 m)
- Traversed by: US 160, Rio Grande Scenic Railroad

Third Approach
- Location: Costilla / Huerfano counties, Colorado, United States
- Range: Sangre de Cristo Mountains
- Coordinates: 37°36′50″N 105°11′21″W
- Topo map: USGS La Veta Pass

La Veta Pass is the name associated with two mountain passes in the Sangre de Cristo Mountains of south-central Colorado in the United States, both on the boundary between Costilla and Huerfano counties.

Old La Veta Pass (officially La Veta Pass), elevation 9,380 ft (2,860 m), was at one time a main travel route between the San Luis Valley and Walsenburg, first on the narrow gauge Denver and Rio Grande Railway, and later on a wagon road and then highway following the same alignment. The route featured two tight curves on the eastern approach to the summit, making the grade feasible for railroad operation, but leaving the route less than satisfactory as a highway. It is now an unpaved and lightly traveled back road.

New La Veta Pass (officially North La Veta Pass), elevation 9,413 ft (2,869 m), lies about 1.6 miles northeast of the old pass and is now the principal highway route through this part of the mountain range, carrying U.S. Highway 160. While this new route is slightly higher, it has no sharp curves and is thus better suited to modern highway traffic.

These two passes should not be confused with yet another Sangre de Cristo crossing with a very similar name:

Veta Pass, elevation 9,220 ft (2,810 m), lies about 7.7 miles southeast of Old La Veta Pass. When the Denver and Rio Grande Railway decided to convert its line over the Sangre de Cristo from narrow gauge to standard gauge, it elected to follow a new route over Veta Pass, completing the project in 1899. In 2003 the San Luis and Rio Grande Railroad took over operation of the line. The Rio Grande Scenic Railroad operated steam excursion trains between Alamosa and La Veta over the pass before it went into receivership in 2019.
