= Lake Superior and Ishpeming Railroad =

Mining railroad based in the Upper Peninsula of Michigan

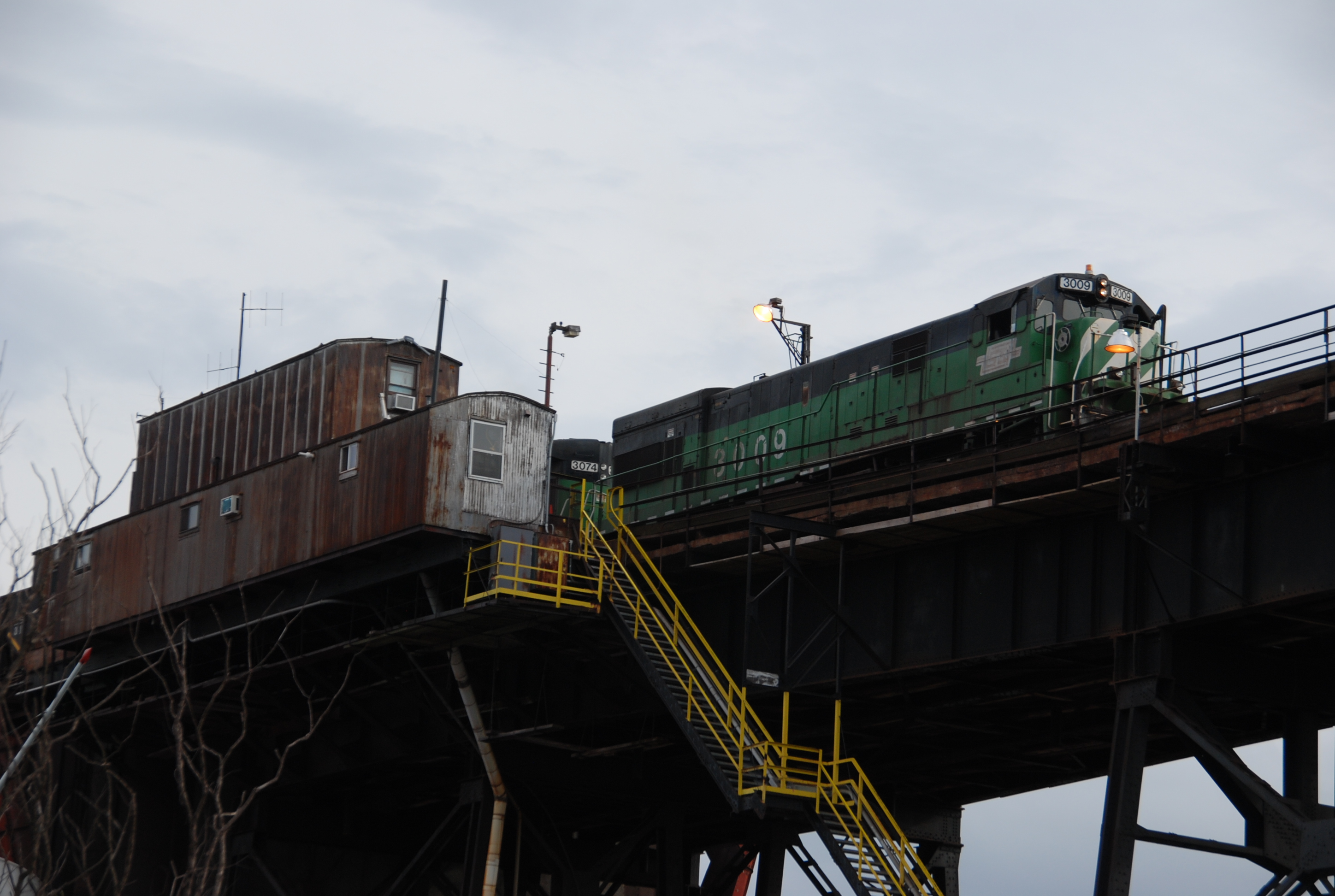
- A LS&I freight train on the Presque Isle Ore Dock in Marquette, Michigan, September 3, 2011

Overview
- Headquarters: Marquette, Michigan
- Reporting mark: LS&I
- Locale: Upper Peninsula of Michigan
- Dates of operation: 1896–present

Technical
- Track gauge: 4 ft 8 1/2 in (1,435 mm) standard gauge
- Length: 117 mi (188 km)

The Lake Superior and Ishpeming Railroad (reporting mark LS&I), is a Class III railroad U.S. railroad offering service from Marquette, Michigan, to nearby locations in Michigan's Upper Peninsula. It began operations in 1896. The LS&I continues to operate as an independent railroad from its headquarters in Marquette.

At the end of 1970, LS&I operated 117 miles of road on 241 miles of track (188 on 388 km); that year it reported 43 million ton-miles (63 million tkm) of freight. In 2011, LS&I had been reduced to 25 miles (40 km) of track.

== History ==
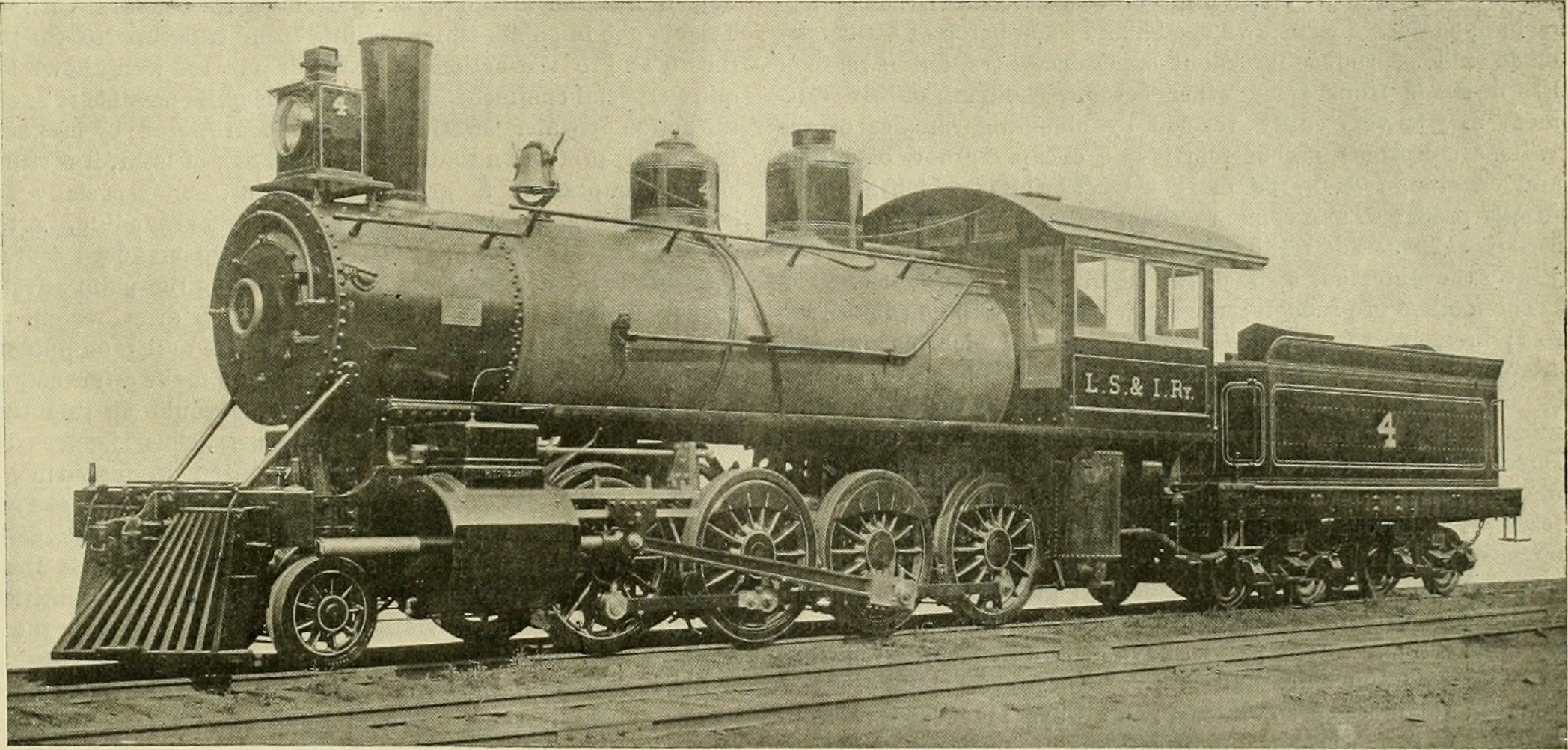
Vintage LS&I steam locomotive, 1890s.

The Lake Superior and Ishpeming Railway was organized in 1893 as a subsidiary of Cleveland-Cliffs Iron Company (now Cleveland-Cliffs Inc.), the iron ore mining company. From the start the railroad's primary business was the transport of iron ore from the Marquette Iron Range, west of Marquette, to docks on Lake Superior from which the ore could be shipped to steel mills on the lower Great Lakes. The primary towns on the iron range are Ishpeming and Negaunee, Michigan.

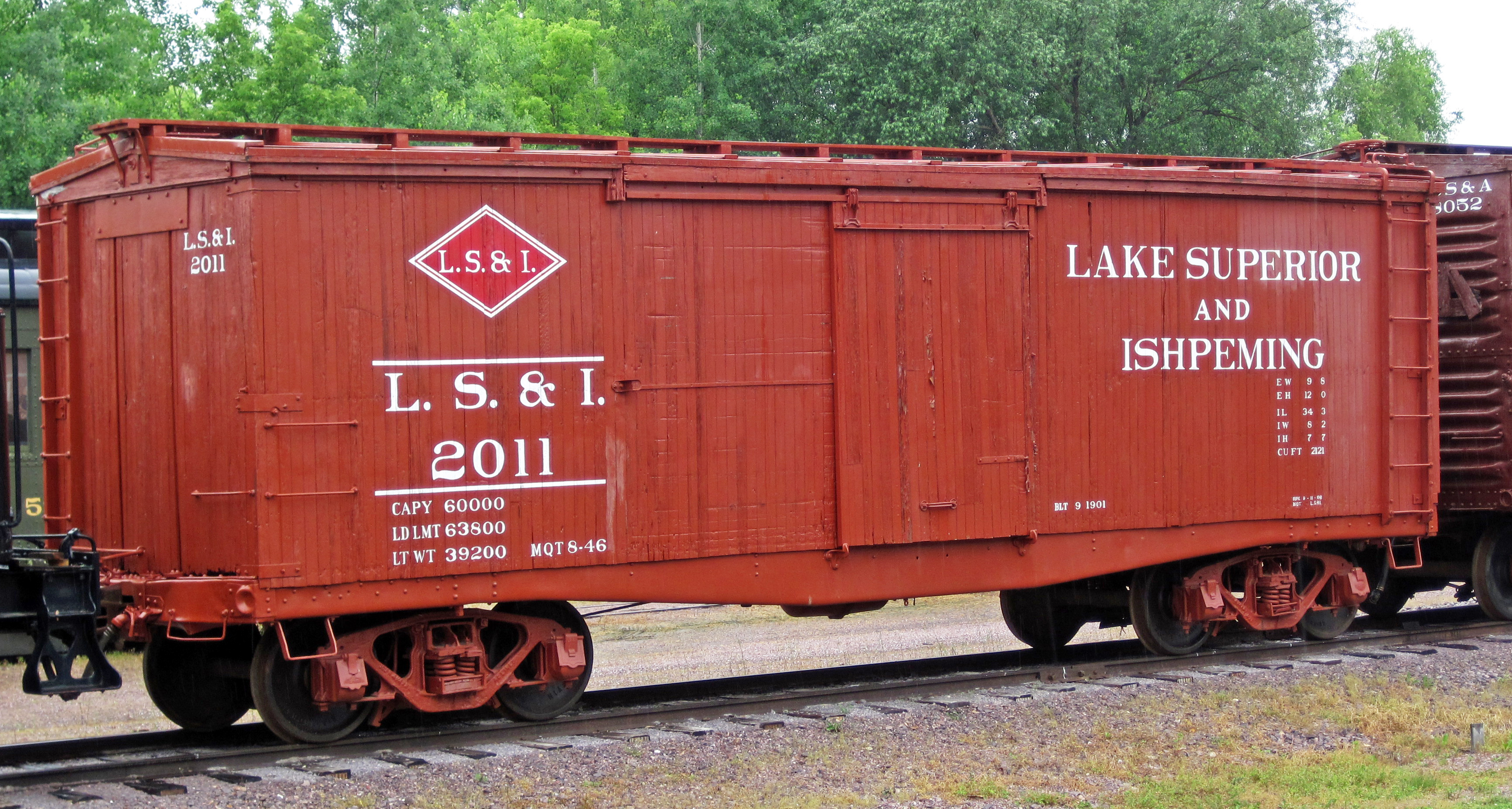
Lake Superior and Ishpeming Railroad box car, built in 1901, on display at Mid-Continent Railway Museum

In 1904 the railroad carried over 1.2 million short tons (1.1 Mt) of freight, and over 1.1 million short tons (1.00 Mt) of that was iron ore. It had 489 ore cars, 14 locomotives, and 121 employees.

In 1923 the LS&I Railway merged with the Munising, Marquette and Southeastern Railway (MM&SE), a short line running from Marquette 40 miles (64 km) east to Munising to form the LS&I Railroad. The LS&I's new spur ran through a section of the Upper Peninsula thickly forested with pulpwood, adding a second commodity to the LS&I's workload. The MM&SE/LS&I also operated a second spur from Marquette northwest to Big Bay.

Passenger operations were never major. In 1904 the railroad carried over 180,000 passenger-miles, compared to over 24 million ton-miles (35 million tkm) of freight. In 1931 two trains a day ran each way from Munising to Lawson, Marquette and Princeton. One train ran from Marquette to Big Bay and one on the east branch from Munising to Shingleton. By 1940 the Munising-to-Princeton and Lawton-to-Marquette service had been reduced to one train a day each way, and Big Bay service was operating three times a week. This level of service lasted at least to 1950. By 1955 the only passenger service remaining was a single daily train from Munising to Princeton; Marquette and Big Bay were no longer served. All passenger service had been discontinued by 1960. By 1962, diesel locomotives had replaced steam locomotives on the line.

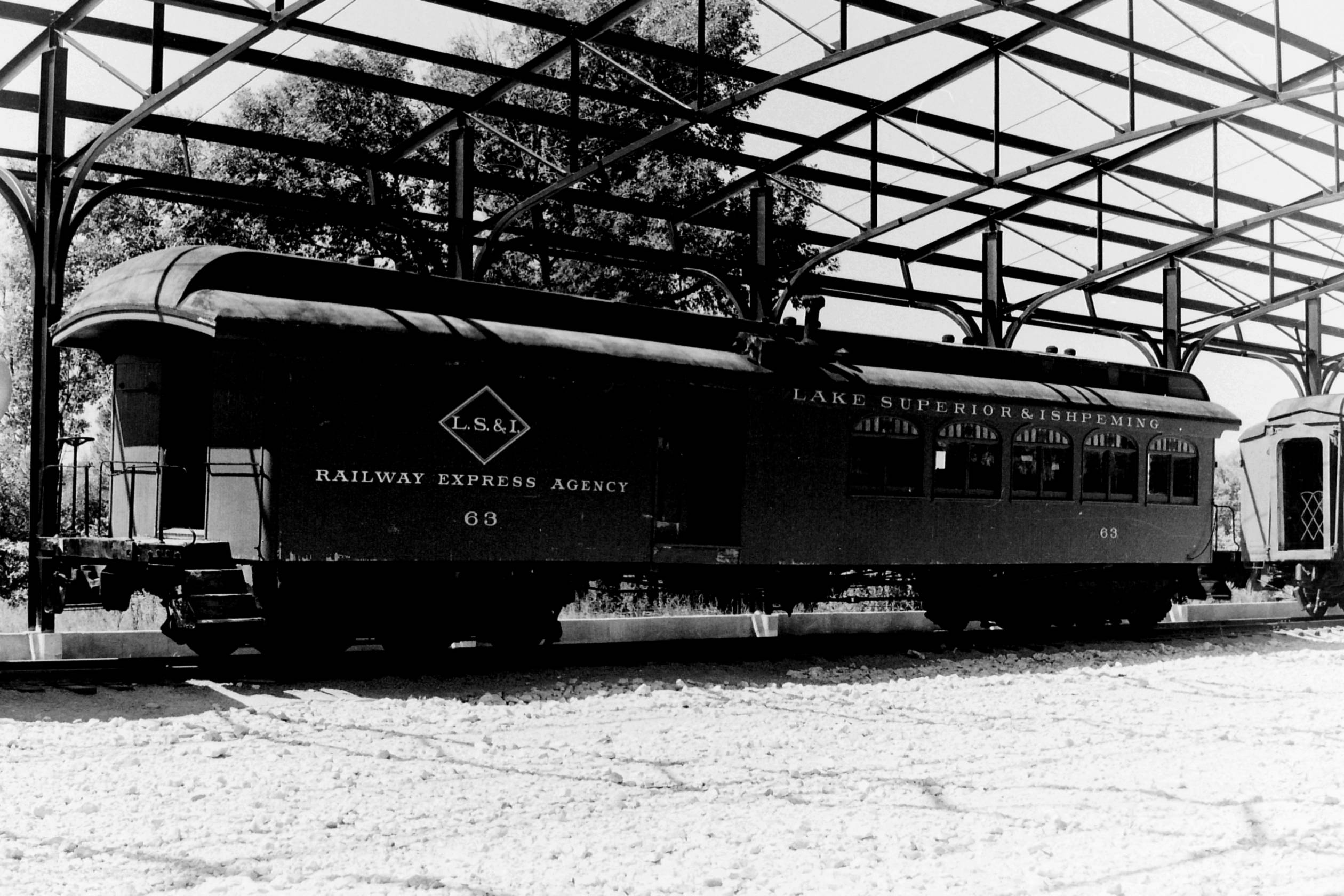
LS&I Railway Express Agency car "J.H.Kline" at the National Railroad Museum

The Big Bay spur was sold in the 1960s and Munising operations ended in the 1980s. A line between Humboldt and the Republic Mine (part of the Marquette Iron Range) was abandoned and railbanked in 2004. Part of the line was reactivated by the Mineral Range Railroad in 2012 for a new mine, the Humboldt Mine.

As of 2016, the Lake Superior & Ishpeming's primary remaining business continued to be the transport of iron ore over a 16-mile (26 km) short line from the Tilden Mine south of Ishpeming, operated by Cleveland-Cliffs, to Lake Superior for transport. Tonnage was declining sharply due to the shutdown of the adjacent Empire Mine, also historically served by the LS&I.

== Engineering ==
The Lake Superior & Ishpeming's historic main line operates on a relatively steep grade, called "The Hill", from Marquette to the iron mines. The steepest gradient is 1.63%.

Because of the location of the LS&I's Marquette docks, the railroad must cross the Dead River. The trestle is 565 feet (172 m) long and 104 feet (32 m) high.

== Nicknames ==
The LS&I's nicknames have included "Hayden's Scheme," "The Hook and Eye," "Little Sally and Imogene" (after the names of two daughters of H. R. Harris, its first general manager), and "Lazy, Slow, and Independent".

== Preservation ==
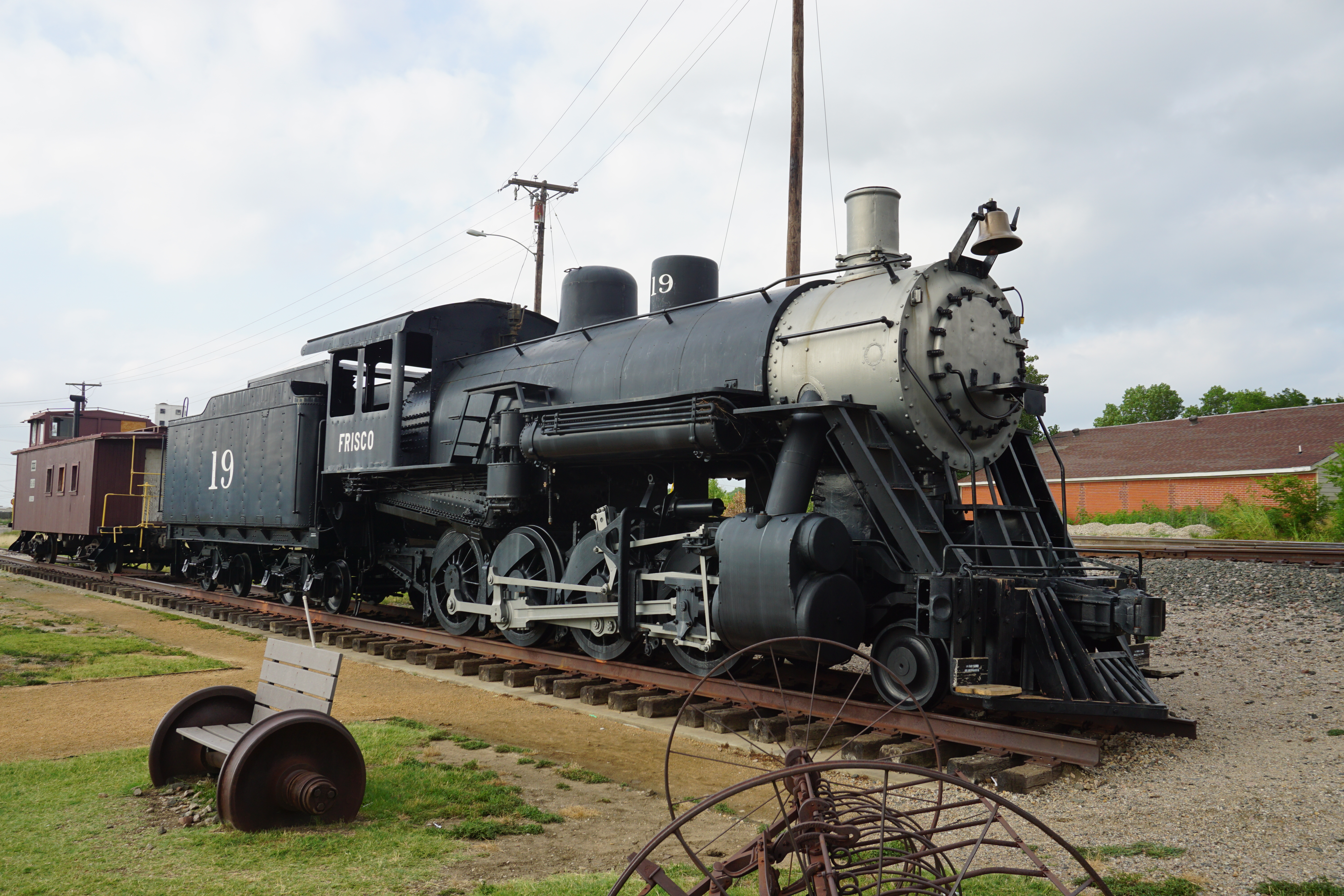
LSI ALCO 2-8-0 No. 19 (lettered as Frisco 19) on static display in Frisco, Texas

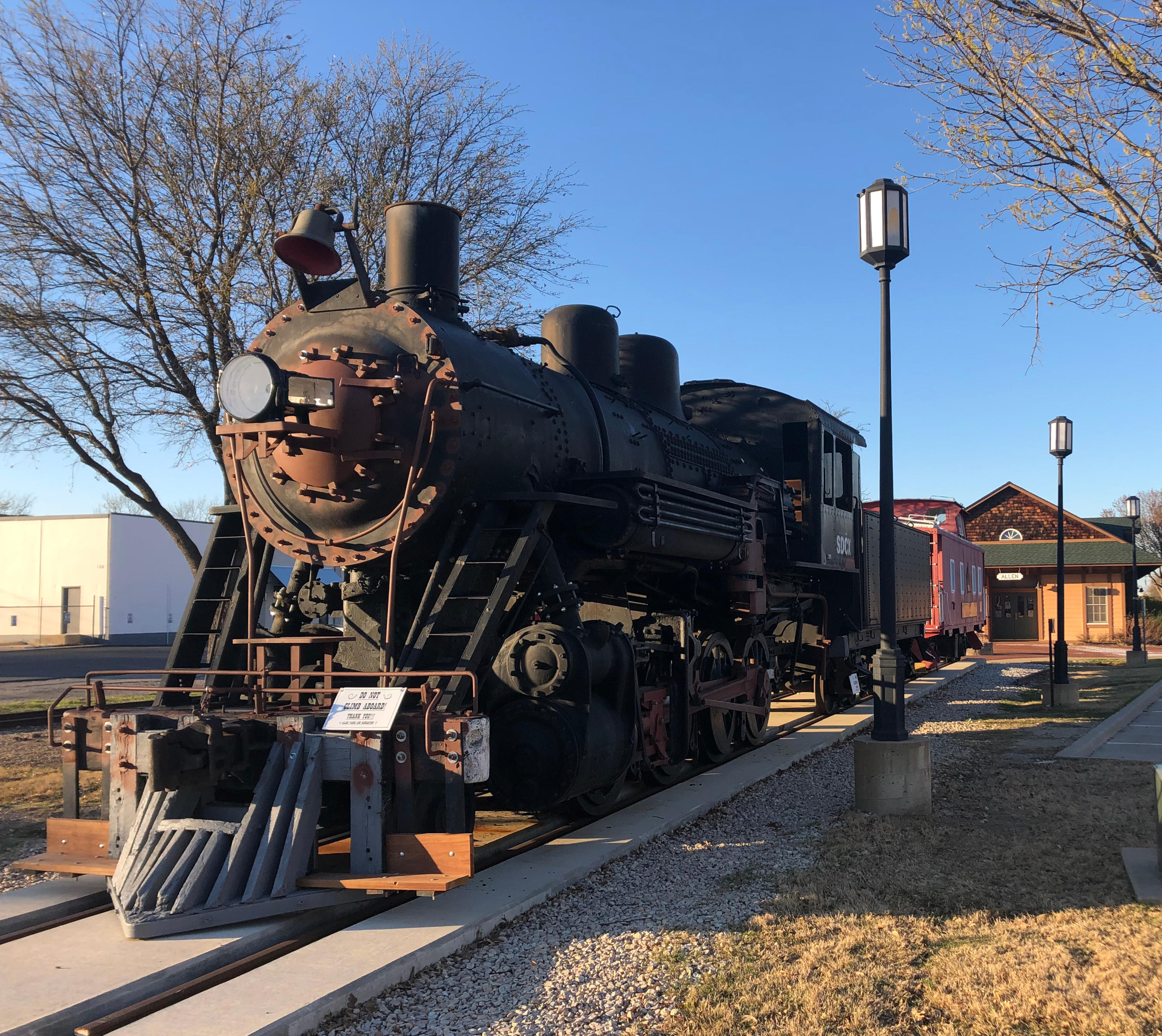
LSI ALCO 2-8-0 No. 20 on static display in Allen, Texas

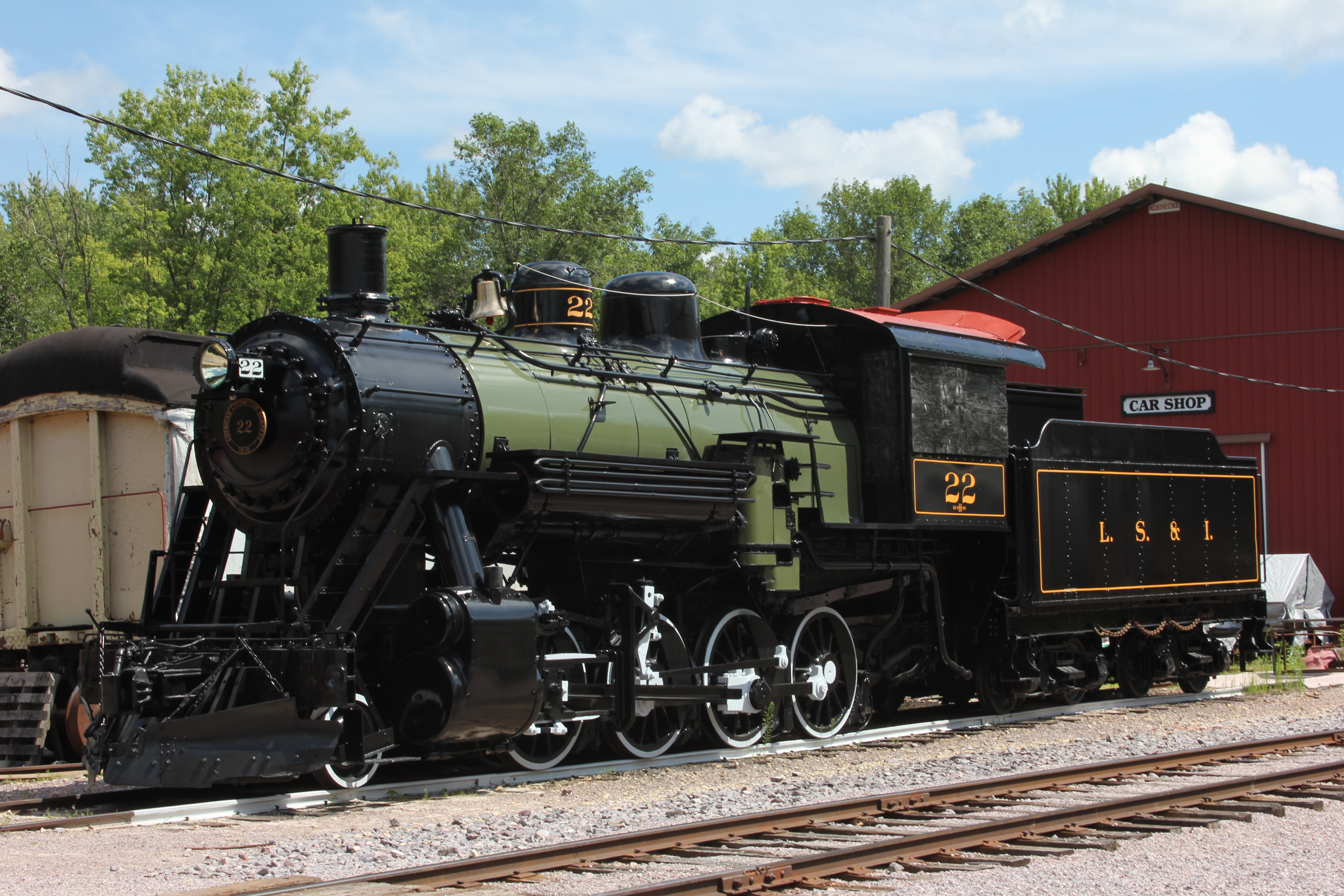
LS&I ALCO 2-8-0 No. 22 preserved at North Freedom, Wisconsin, July 2016

Almost all the preserved steam locomotives from the LS&I were initially saved by the Marquette and Huron Mountain tourist railroad of Marquette. All were sold off to separate preservation groups by 2002.

- The only 2-8-2 from the LS&I that's preserved is MK-1 No. 14, built by Baldwin in 1913. It was originally operated by the Duluth and Northern Minnesota Railroad, before being sold to the LS&I in 1919. The 14 was donated to the Lake Superior Railroad Museum in Duluth, Minnesota, where it operated between 1992 and 1998. It still remains at the museum as a display piece.
- The former LS&I #18 a Consolidation, a 2-8-0 Consolidation-type built by Alco in 1910, was owned, like many former LS&I locomotives by the Grand Canyon Railway. It has since been sold to Brian Fleming, who operated it on the Mount Hood Railroad, before selling it to Iowa Pacific Holdings, who operated it on the Rio Grande Scenic Railroad. In March 2021, No. 18 has been purchased by the Maguire Foundation, who donated it to the Colebrookdale Railroad in Boyertown, Pennsylvania. It is now undergoing a rebuild near Pottstown.
- LS&I #19, has been on static display in Frisco, Texas, since 2004. This locomotive is now lettered as Frisco 19, but it did not actually operate on the St. Louis-San Francisco (Frisco) Railway. This locomotive was also formerly owned by the Grand Canyon Railway, before being sold to MGM Grand Adventures Theme Park in Las Vegas, Nevada. It was purchased by the City of Frisco, Texas specifically for use as a static display to be representative of a typical Frisco locomotive. Frisco operated a number of Consolidations as Frisco-series 1306 engines.
- LS&I #20 was also owned by the Grand Canyon Railway and was traded along with the 18 to Brian Fleming. It is now on static display at the Allen Heritage Center in Allen, Texas.
- LS&I #21 was the last locomotive to leave the abandoned tourist railroad in 2004, after being purchased by Michael Goodell. It is now disassembled at Wisconsin in a slow process of being rebuilt for operational purposes by BMG Railroad Contractors.
- The railroad's former Locomotive #22, a 2-8-0 Consolidation-type built in 1910 and acquired by the line in 1924, is preserved along with several of the line's coaches and cars at the Mid-Continent Railway Museum in North Freedom, Wisconsin.
- LS&I #23, another Consolidation built by Alco in 1910, is currently situated at the Empire State Railway Museum in Phoenicia, New York. As of 2022, it is undergoing a cosmetic restoration.
- LS&I #24, another Consolidation, is on static display at the National Railroad Museum in Green Bay, Wisconsin. LS&I Passenger Car #62 and Passenger/Baggage Car #63 are also found in the NRRM’s collection.
- LS&I Locomotive #29 is owned and operated by the Grand Canyon Railway in Williams, Arizona. It was out of service from 2019 to undergo an 1472-day Federal Railroad Administration inspection and overhaul, and was returned to service in August 2026.
- Former Locomotive #33, a Baldwin 2-8-0 from 1916, has been restored to operating condition and is currently under ownership of the Age of Steam Roundhouse in Sugarcreek, Ohio.
- The Illinois Railway Museum had two former Consolidation Locomotives, #34 and #35. #35 remained in the museum collection on Static Display since 1985, while #34 was on display since 1971, before being sold to and operated by the Western Maryland Scenic Railroad in Cumberland, Maryland as #734. It is currently out of service and under restoration to return it to operation.
