= Iowa Pacific Holdings =

Railroad company (2001-2020)

- Type: Private
- Industry: Railroad
- Founded: 2001
- Defunct: 2020
- Headquarters: Chicago, Illinois, United States
- Key people: Edwin E. Ellis, Jr, CEO
- Revenue: ▲US$50 million
- Number of employees: 200
- Subsidiaries: U.S.A. Permian Basin Railways; Texas – New Mexico Railroad; West Texas and Lubbock Railway; Texas State Railroad; Chicago Terminal Railroad; Rio Grande Scenic Railroad; Mount Hood Railroad; Saratoga and North Creek Railroad; Santa Cruz and Monterey Bay Railway; U.K. Dartmoor Railway; Weardale Railway
- Website: www.iowapacific.net

Iowa Pacific Holdings was a holding company that owned railroad properties across North America and the United Kingdom, as well as providing services such as railcar repairs, leasing, management and consulting services to other operators. The company was founded in 2001 with its headquarters in Chicago, Illinois.

== History ==
Iowa Pacific's North American freight services were operated by subsidiary Permian Basin Railways, which was formed in 2002 to operate the Texas – New Mexico Railroad and the West Texas and Lubbock Railway. Iowa Pacific through Permian Basin acquired the Arizona Eastern Railway in 2004, (sold September 1, 2011 to Genesee & Wyoming Inc.) the San Luis & Rio Grande Railroad in 2005, the Chicago Terminal Railroad in 2006 and the Mount Hood Railroad in 2008.

In addition to freight operations, Iowa Pacific operated several passenger trains through North America. The Rio Grande Scenic Railroad began operations in 2006. The Mount Hood Railroad, which operates both freight and passenger services, was purchased in 2008, the same year Copper Spike Excursion Train service began over Arizona Eastern trackage.

In August 2011, the Arizona Eastern Railway was sold to Genesee & Wyoming.

The Saratoga and North Creek Railway began operations in the summer of 2011, offering scheduled passenger rail service, as opposed to excursion trains. Passenger operations ceased on April 7, 2018 as well as the final revenue freight train to remove stored tank cars.

Iowa Pacific also owned the Dartmoor Railway and had a controlling stake in the Weardale Railway, both heritage lines in England. Iowa Pacific purchased the companies in 2008, operating them under the name British American Railway Services.

In 2012, Iowa Pacific acquired three railroad operations during the year:

- In April it acquired the Texas State Railroad, an excursion train operating between Palestine, Texas and Rusk, Texas.
- In May it acquired operating rights on the Santa Cruz Branch between Watsonville and Davenport. The company established the Santa Cruz and Monterey Bay Railway to run freight and passenger services on the line, supplementing the existing Santa Cruz, Big Trees and Pacific Railway operations. In November–December 2012, SCMB ran "The Train to Christmas Town," a holiday train based on a story written by Peggy Ellis and illustrated by Jeff Lee (video game artist).
- In October it purchased Cape Rail, a company that runs Massachusetts Coastal Railroad and Cape Cod Central Railroad.

In February 2014, Iowa Pacific began test runs of the Eastern Flyer, a proposed regular passenger train service between Oklahoma City and Tulsa. However, the company later abandoned the project.

In April 2015, Iowa Pacific announced a deal with the Indiana Department of Transportation and Amtrak to supply rolling stock and on-board services personnel for the Hoosier State, which runs between Chicago and Indianapolis. Indiana announced on January 30, 2017, that Amtrak would resume providing rolling stock for the Hoosier State on March 1, as Iowa Pacific was no longer able to fulfill the contract.

In May 2015, Watco announced that it would purchase two Iowa Pacific subsidiaries, the Texas & New Mexico Railway and the West Texas and Lubbock Railway.

In September 2015, Iowa Pacific took over operations of the Grenada Railway in Mississippi. The Grenada Railway, was subsequently acquired by RailUSA in August 2018 and renamed the Grenada Railroad.

=== Dissolution ===
Iowa Pacific Holdings and its subsidiaries had severe financial trouble and held large debts. In 2019 and 2020, many of IPH's subsidiaries were placed into receivership. Along with IPH's subsidiaries facing serious financial trouble, Iowa Pacific's two main rolling stock holding companies, Heritage Rail Leasing and San Luis & Rio Grande Railroad were forced into Chapter 11 bankruptcy and were appointed a trustee by a U.S. bankruptcy court in Denver. Iowa Pacific Holdings itself filed for Chapter 7 bankruptcy in U.S. bankruptcy court in Northern Illinois in late March 2021. As of 2021, Iowa Pacific Holdings former rolling stock and subsidiary railroads have been sold and auctioned off by the appointed trustees.
