= List of San Francisco Bay Area trains =

This is a list of trains and train museums in the San Francisco Bay Area of Northern California in the United States.

== Full-size commuter trains ==
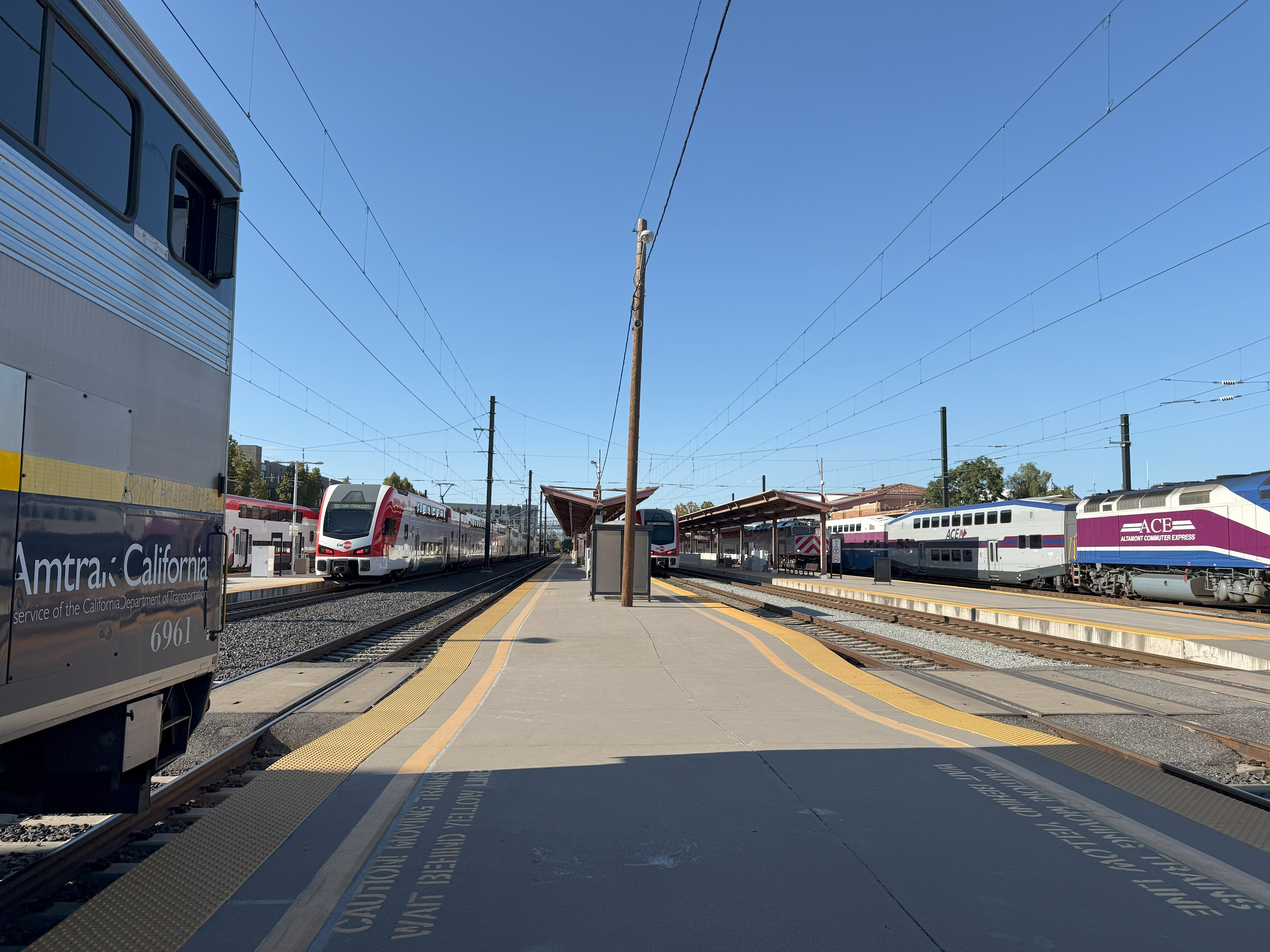
Numerous train services at San Jose Diridon

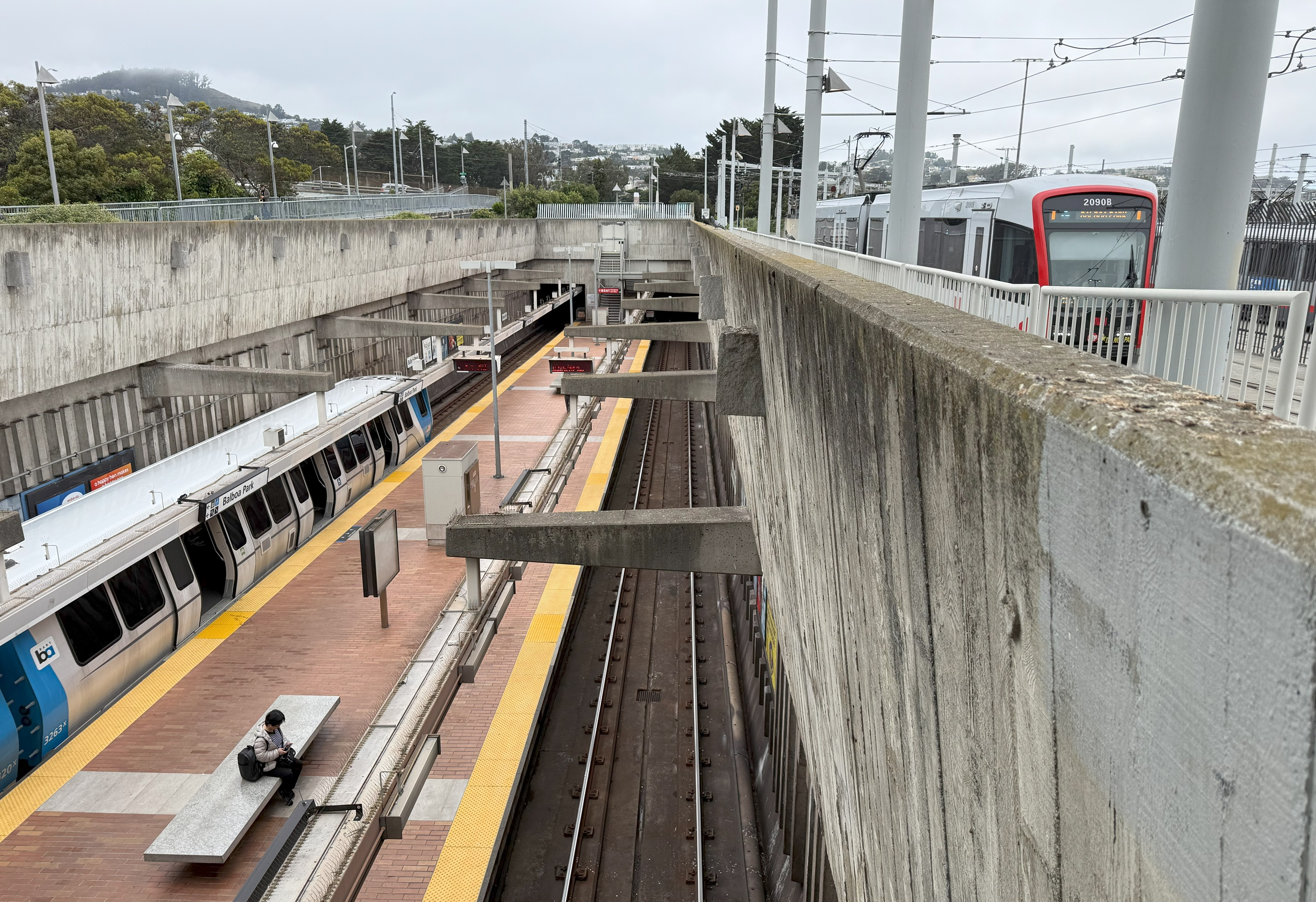
BART and Muni Metro trains at Balboa Park

The Bay Area hosts several regional commuter rail operations, as well as inter-city rail.

Commuter and intercity

- Altamont Corridor Express (ACE)
- Amtrak (California Zephyr, Capitol Corridor, Coast Starlight, and Gold Runner)
- Caltrain
- Sonoma–Marin Area Rail Transit

Rapid transit

- Bay Area Rapid Transit (BART)

Light rail / streetcar

- VTA light rail (VTA)
- San Francisco Municipal Transportation Agency (SFMTA)
  - Muni Heritage streetcars (including the Market Street Railway)
  - Muni Metro
  - San Francisco cable car system

== Full-size excursion trains ==
The Bay Area is home to several heritage railways that operate full size trains.

- Ardenwood Historic Farm – Fremont
- California Trolley and Railroad Corporation – San Jose
- Napa Valley Wine Train – between Napa and St. Helena
- Niles Canyon Railway – between Fremont and Sunol
- Roaring Camp & Big Trees Narrow Gauge Railroad
- Santa Cruz, Big Trees and Pacific Railway

== Ride-on trains ==
The Bay Area is home to several ridable miniature railways.

=== East Bay ===
- Golden Gate Live Steamers – Berkeley
- Kennedy Park Train - Hayward
- Oakland Zoo – Oakland
- Redwood Valley Railway – Berkeley

=== Peninsula ===
- Central Park Bianchi Train – San Mateo
- Emerald Hills Railway – Redwood City
- Little Puffer – San Francisco Zoo

=== North Bay ===
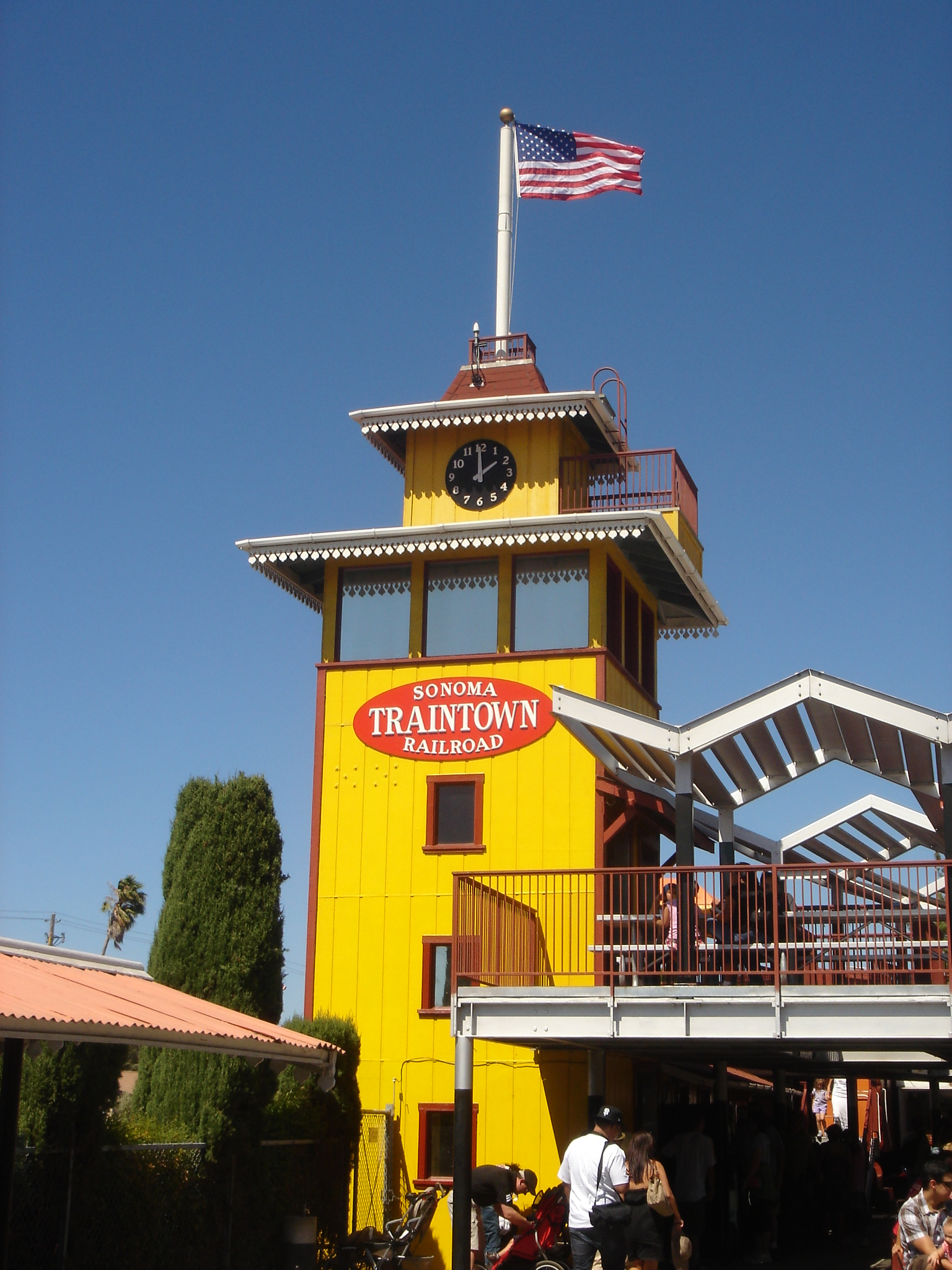
Entrance to Sonoma TrainTown

- Seaside Railway at Six Flags Discovery Kingdom – Vallejo
- Sonoma TrainTown Railroad – Sonoma

=== South Bay ===
- Billy Jones Wildcat Railroad – Los Gatos
- Bonfante Railroad Train Ride and Sky Trail Monorail at Gilroy Gardens – Gilroy
- Happy Hollow Park & Zoo – San Jose

== Museums ==
The Bay Area is home to several independent railway museums.

=== East Bay ===
- Golden Gate Railroad Museum – Niles Canyon
- Niles Depot Museum – Fremont

=== North Bay ===
- Tiburon Depot – Tiburon
- Western Railway Museum – Solano County

=== Peninsula ===
- Colma Historical Association – Colma
- Millbrae Train Museum – Millbrae, California
- San Francisco Cable Car Museum – San Francisco
- San Francisco Railway Museum – San Francisco

=== South Bay ===
- Los Altos History Museum – Los Altos
- Edward Peterman Museum of Railroad History – Santa Clara

== Model trains ==
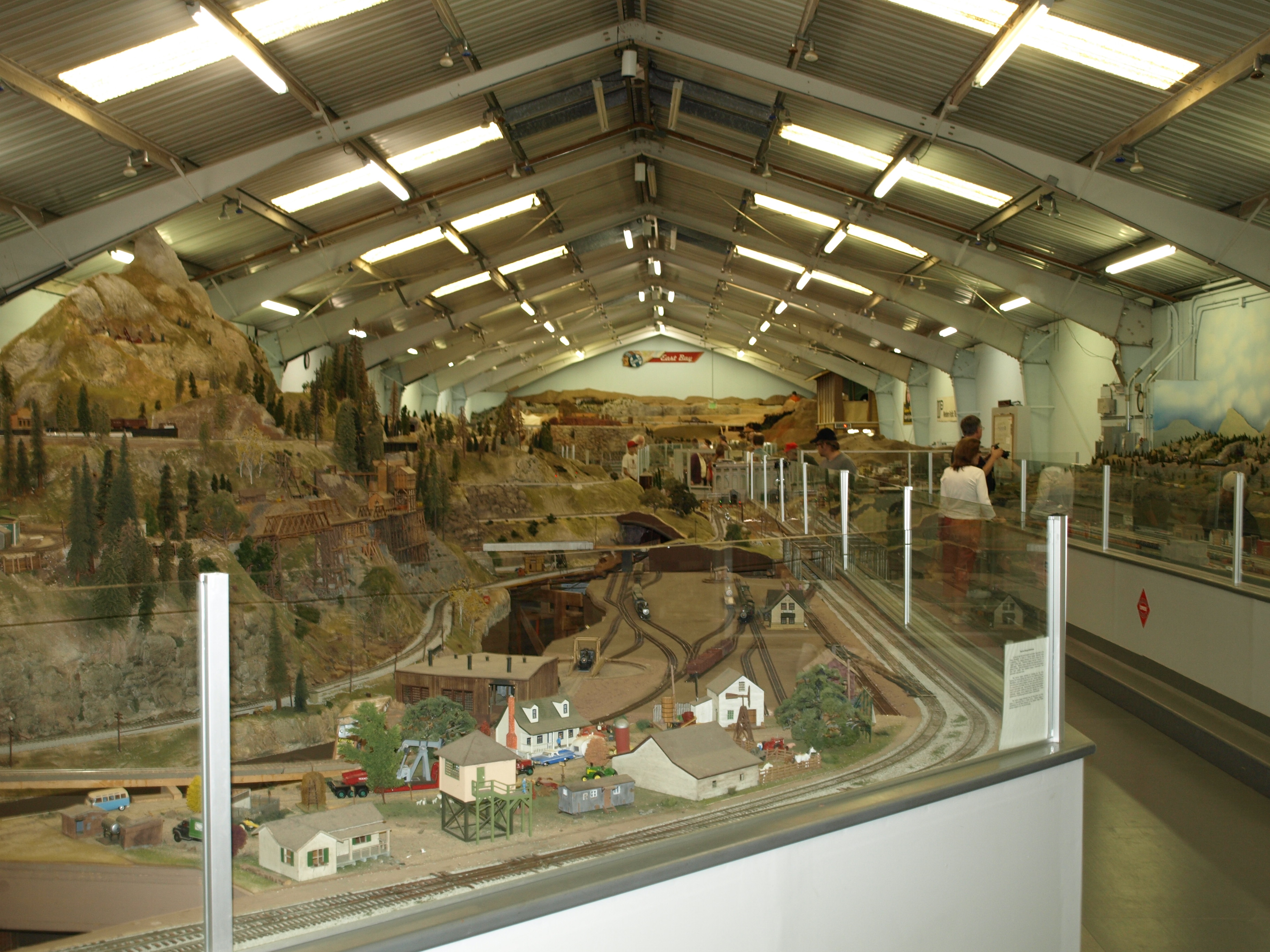
Golden State Models in Point Richmond

There are several clubs in the Bay Area that are home to large layout model trains.

=== North Bay ===
- Golden State Model Railroad Museum – Richmond
- Carquinez Model Railroad Society - Crockett

=== East Bay ===
- Alameda County Fairgrounds – Pleasanton
- Black Diamond Lines Model Railroad Club – Antioch
- Diablo Valley Lines – Walnut Creek
- Niles Depot Museum – Fremont
- Walnut Creek Model Railroad Society – Walnut Creek

=== Peninsula ===
Barron Park Garden Railway – Palo Alto

- Golden Gate Model Railroad Club – San Francisco
- Golden Gate Lionel Railroad Club- San Mateo
- West Bay Model Railroad Association – Menlo Park

=== South Bay ===
- Edward Peterman Museum of Railroad History – Santa Clara
- Silicon Valley Lines – San Jose

== See also ==
- List of California railroads
