= Southern Pacific 9010 =

Preserved Krauss-Maffei ML 4000 C′C′ diesel-hydraulic locomotive

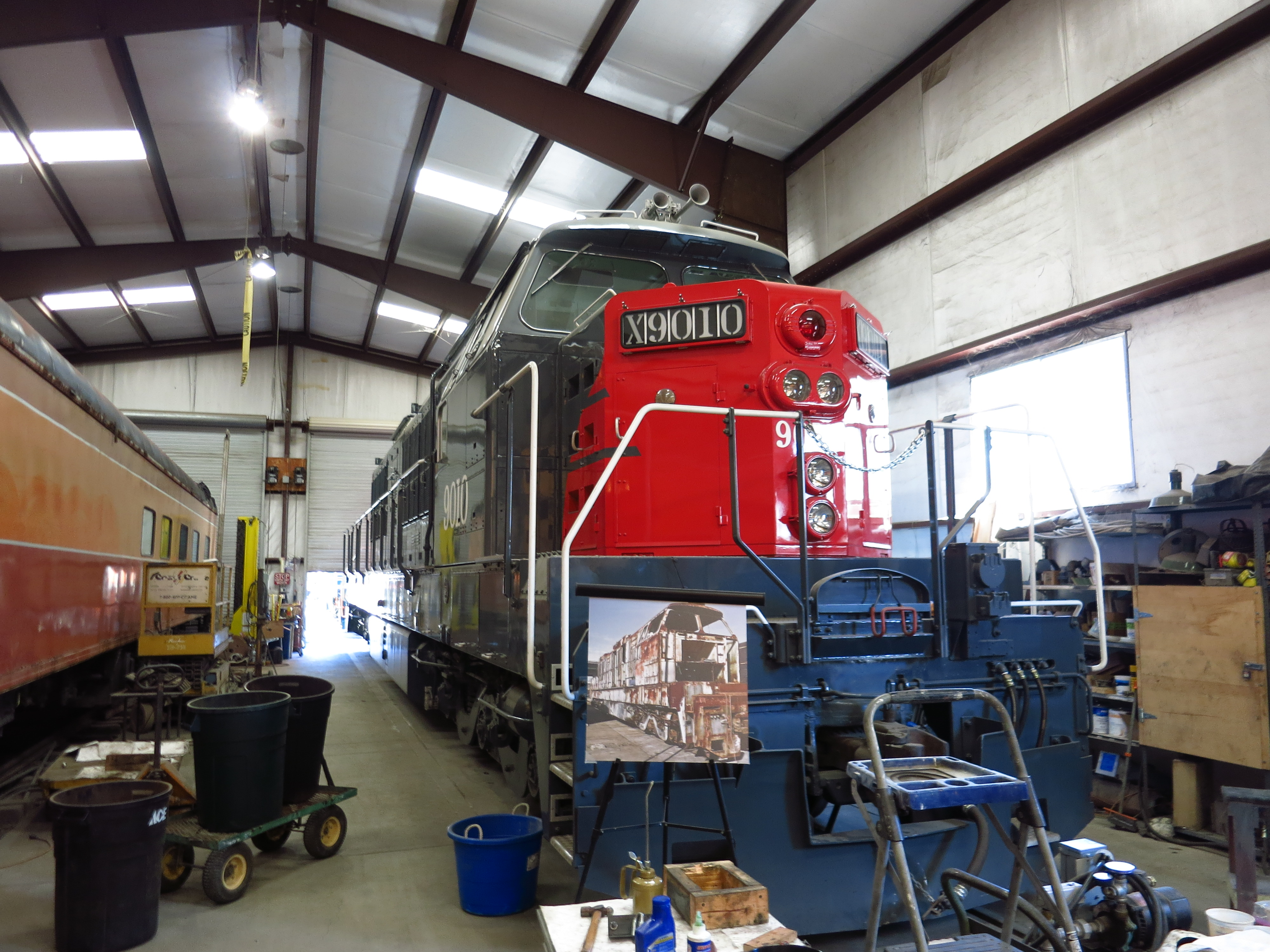
- Southern Pacific 9010 on display inside the Niles Canyon Brightside Yard
Type and origin
- Power type: Diesel
- Builder: Krauss-Maffei
- Serial number: 19106
- Model: ML-4000
- Build date: 1964
- Rebuild date: 1968-1969 (as camera car)
Specifications
- Configuration
  - AAR: C-C
  - UIC: C′C′
- Gauge: 4 ft 8 1/2 in (1,435 mm)
- Fuel type: Diesel
- Prime mover: Dual Maybach MD850 V16s
- Engine type: 2× V16 diesel engines
- Aspiration: Turbocharger
- Transmission: Hydraulic
- Loco brake: Air and Hydrodynamic brake
- Train brakes: Air
Performance figures
- Maximum speed: 70 mph (110 km/h)
- Indicated power: 3,540 hp (2,640 kW)
Career
- Operators: Southern Pacific Railroad
- Numbers: 9010, renum 9113 in 1965, SPMW 1166 in 1968, 8799 in 1969
- Locale: Roseville, California, then flat territories, California
- Retired: 1968 (as a locomotive), 1984 (as a 'camera car')
- Current owner: Pacific Locomotive Association
- Disposition: Operational at the Niles Canyon Railway.

Southern Pacific 9010 is a KM ML 4000 C′C′ diesel-hydraulic locomotive, built in 1964 by German manufacturer Krauss-Maffei for the Southern Pacific Railroad. SP 9010 generated 4,000 horsepower (3,000 kW) from two 2,000-horsepower (1,500 kW) V16 Maybach MD870 diesel engines. It is the sole surviving ML 4000 C′C′ built for use in North America, and the sole surviving mainline diesel-hydraulic locomotive in North America (several diesel-hydraulic switchers exist in service and in museums).

It was painted to Southern Pacific's 1958 standard, the so-called 'bloody nose' colors of Scarlet and Lark Dark Gray, for its entire operating career. It was renumbered to SP 9113 in late 1965, rebuilt extensively at SP's Sacramento General Shops (later Sacramento Locomotive Works) during the latter half of 1966, and was initially retired in 1968. It was revived and rebuilt by Sacramento General Shops into a 'camera car' for the purpose of shooting motion picture background plates for a ground-based full-motion locomotive training simulator. As camera car number 8799, it was retired in 1984 and donated to the California State Railroad Museum in Sacramento, California. It was de-accessioned by CSRM and acquired by the Pacific Locomotive Association and moved to the Niles Canyon Railway's Brightside, California rail yard in the summer of 2008. At the date of its inception, its type represented the highest-horsepower six-axle diesel locomotives in the world.

== Operational history ==
SP 9010 was delivered as part of the second order of ML 4000 C′C′ units in the spring of 1964, road numbers 9003-9017. (ML: Mechanical Locomotive; 4000: net horsepower; C′C′: two powered bogies/trucks with three connected axles each.) The first order of six locomotives—three for SP and three for the Denver and Rio Grande Western—were called 'prototypes' by KM, but were popularly known in the U.S. as 'cab units' due to their fully enclosed car bodies, similar to the EMD F-unit. KM originally suggested to SP and DRGW a 'center cab' unit, which had a cab in between the two prime movers, but both roads turned it down. SP 9010 was a member of the second production order of fifteen locomotives. These were called "Series" units by KM, but were known as 'hood units' in the US after the more modern narrow-hood carbody with external walkways. SP's stated motives for ordering the German-manufactured locomotives were a desire for more power per axle, better adhesion to the rails, freedom from electrical malfunctions, and fewer locomotives in consist than the available American diesel-electric locomotives of the time.

SP owned a total of 21 ML 4000 C′C′ locomotives, and a total of 24 of the diesel-hydraulic type. ML 4000s were originally used in freight service on SP's famous Donner Pass line over California's Sierra Nevada, as they were originally intended to replace the EMD F7, and had a special track set up at the Roseville locomotive shops specifically for servicing the locomotives, with German mechanics and supervisors from K-M taking U.S. residence. However, the locomotives were found unsuitable in mountain service after extensive testing and relegated to service in the flat territory of the San Joaquin Valley, often running in tandem with EMD F7s or EMD GP9s.

== Retirement as a locomotive ==
The ML 4000s and diesel-hydraulic locomotives in general began to be phased out in the late 1960s, as American locomotive technology progressed and more power with better adhesion control was available from single-engine diesel-electric locomotives. Maintenance requirements had exceeded the average levels of comparable domestic locomotives, and a planned upgrading of the entire KM 'Series' fleet was halted after only four of the 15 were so modified. ML 4000s began retirement in 1967, coincident with the arrival of high-horsepower American-made EMD SD40s, SD45s, and GE U33Cs. SP announced the end of its diesel-hydraulic program on February 13, 1968, and from that date forward, any wear or damage requiring major repair or overhaul would result in the retirement of that unit.

SP 9113 was sidelined on September 18, 1968, with damage to the number 9 cylinder of the forward Maybach V-16, and was officially retired November 22, 1968. Scrapping of the Krauss-Maffei fleet took place at Associated Metals in Sacramento, California, with the exception of SP 9113.

== Camera car ==
SP 9113 (ex-9010) was converted into a rolling motion picture camera platform between 1968 and 1969 at the Sacramento General Shops. Its purpose was to record picture and audio to create the background motion plates and sound effects for a computerized locomotive simulator for engineer training, developed by Conductron-Missouri, a subsidiary of McDonnell-Douglas. This pioneering six-axis-of-motion locomotive simulator was housed in a fixed-base operation in Southern California. Called the 'Southern Pacific Engine Service Training Center', it was located in Cerritos, California.

SP 9113 when being rebuilt carried the unofficial identity 'SPMW #1'. The railroad's traffic computer required 4 digits, and so it emerged from the shop bearing a small SPMW 1166 stencil. In June 1969 it was renumbered to SP 8799, in standard Southern Pacific locomotive numbering practice. (SP's lowest numbered SD45 was #8800, so a four-digit number was created for the Simulator Camera Car and the simulator itself which occupied the number immediately preceding.) The most drastic change in appearance was the locomotive's short hood (or 'nose'), which had been removed. In its place, a custom structure was fabricated to house twin Mitchell half-frame 35-millimeter film cameras and Nagra III timecode magnetic recording equipment, with stand-up headroom and two seats salvaged from another KM for operators. Heavy, thick steel was used for collision protection and to replace lost weight. The front Voith L830rU transmission was removed to create space for the camera enclosure, while the Number 1 radiator compartment was emptied of radiators and ancillary equipment to house an Onan skid-mount generator to power the camera equipment. The two engines and rear transmission were simply disabled, principally being retained for weight. All gearboxes and Cardan (universal) shafts were removed; gears were left in place on the six axles. All of the controls remained in the cab so that it could control a locomotive pushing behind it, much like a cab car is used on a commuter train. The camera car could be put on the lead of any train, but it primarily operated as special trips with just one locomotive behind it for power. Known locomotives used for power are a single EMD F7 B-unit, an EMD GP-9, an EMD GP35, and a Cotton Belt (St. Louis Southwestern) SD45T-2.

Initially reassigned to Roseville, California and making filming runs over portions of SP's Donner Pass line, it was relocated in the 1970s to what became its permanent home at West Colton Yard in Southern California. When in operation, SP personnel referred to SP 8799 as the 'Simulator Car'.

SP used the Simulator Camera Car (under its number 8799) to film for a training program set up by SP. Since the camera of the Camera Car sat about at eye level with an EMD SD45's eye level, the unit was used to train engineers on how to operate such a locomotive. A mock SD45 cab was fabricated and installed in the fixed-base simulator facility in Cerritos, California. In the 16 years to 1986 as a simulator locomotive 8799 had assisted in the training of 2186 student engineers.

== Retirement as a camera car and restoration as a locomotive ==
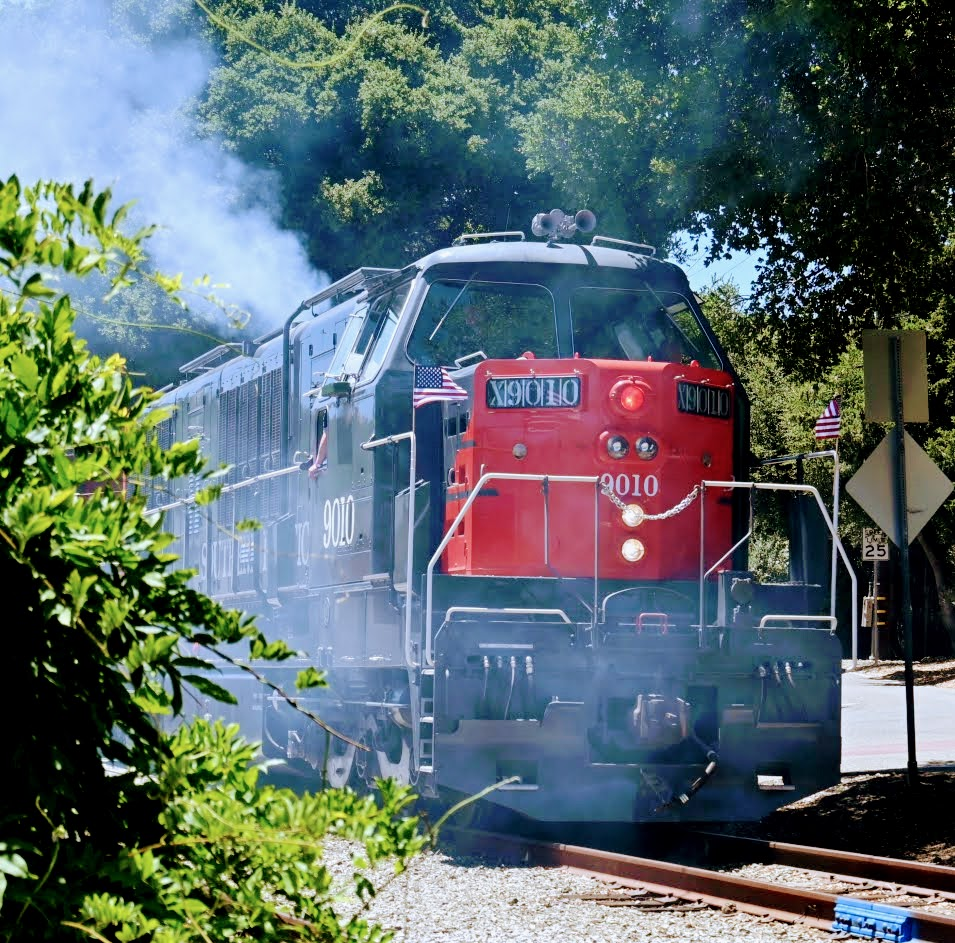
SP 9010 at the 2025 July 4th NCRy Members BBQ celebration, Sunol Depot, CA.

The camera car was retired in 1984 and donated to the California State Railroad Museum in 1986. Initially, volunteers removed the camera 'nose' and opened up the highly modified cab windows to 1964 profiles, with the goal of restoration to original appearance. However, that restoration was halted, and the engine sat in outdoor storage exposed to weather and vandals, with much of the copper wiring and a good portion of the Behr radiator assemblies being stolen. It was de-accessioned by CSRM and donated to the Pacific Locomotive Association (PLA) in 2008, along with several pieces of rolling stock. They were moved by the Union Pacific Railroad in the summer of 2008 from Sacramento to their interchange with Niles Canyon Railway at Hearst, California. The Niles Canyon Railway then transferred SP 9010 to its Brightside Yard. Restoration by volunteers of the PLA started in 2008, with much of the cosmetic restoration nearly completed in 2012.

The restoration process included the building of a replica of the locomotive's original nose, and returning the locomotive to its original 1964 appearance with its original road number, 9010. It retained cab controls as the Simulator Camera car and was pushed by a locomotive providing power from behind. All gearing was removed during the Camera Car conversion, but a powered bogie ("truck") was located and salvaged in Europe. New Cardan main driveshafts were created by The Welte Group to original specifications, allowing the rear Maybach Mercedes-Benz V-16 to power the replaced rear truck. That engine (serial number 91168) has been rebuilt with new factory parts by the volunteer crew of the Pacific Locomotive Association.

On February 14, 2017, the Number 2 Maybach MD870 started up for the first time in nearly 50 years. On October 19, 2017, the locomotive moved under its own power for the first time since 1968, and pulled an SD9 and NW2 up a slight grade. After many years of restoration work, the locomotive debuted on July 20, 2019. There are no plans to restore the Number 1 (front) Maybach MD870 due to its long-time exposure to the elements.

== Model ==
A HO scale brass model of the 9010 as camera car 8799 was produced by AJIN for Overland models.
