= Niles Canyon Railway =

Heritage railroad in California

Coordinates: 37°35′38″N 121°53′23″W

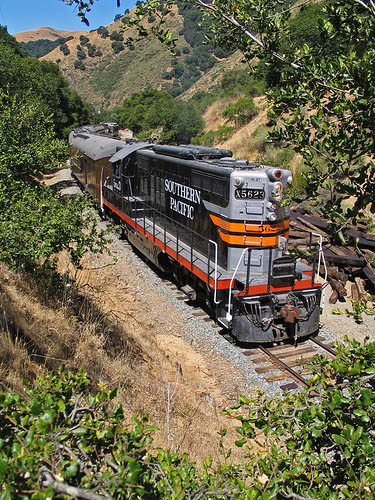
- A Niles Canyon Railway passenger excursion led by Southern Pacific No. 5623
- Locale: Alameda County, California, USA

Commercial operations
- Built by: Western Pacific Railroad (1862-1870)
- Original gauge: 4 ft 8 1/2 in (1,435 mm) standard gauge

Preserved operations
- Owned by: Alameda County
- Operated by: Pacific Locomotive Association
- Reporting mark: NICX
- Stations: 2 (plus 1 planned)
- Length: 9.2 mi (14.8 km)
- Preserved gauge: 4 ft 8 1/2 in (1,435 mm) standard gauge

Commercial history
- Opened: 1869
- Closed: 1984

Preservation history
- 1987: Lease from County and start of reconstruction
- 1988: Began operation
- Headquarters: Fremont, California

Website
- http://www.ncry.org/
- Niles Canyon Transcontinental Railroad Historic District
- U.S. National Register of Historic Places
- U.S. Historic district
- Area: Approximately 200 acres
- Built: 1865–1869
- Architectural style: Other-standard gauge railroad; Other-Warren Truss (bridge); Other-Pratt Truss (bridge); Stick (depot)
- NRHP reference No.: 10000843
- Added to NRHP: October 13, 2010

The Niles Canyon Railway (NCRy) (reporting mark NICX) is a heritage railway running on the first transcontinental railroad alignment (1866, 1869) through Niles Canyon, between Sunol and the Niles district of Fremont in the East Bay of the San Francisco Bay Area, in California, United States. The railway is listed on the National Register of Historic Places as the Niles Canyon Transcontinental Railroad Historic District. The railroad is operated and maintained by the Pacific Locomotive Association which preserves, restores and operates historic railroad equipment. The NCRy features public excursions with both steam and diesel locomotives along a well-preserved portion of the first transcontinental railroad.

== History ==
The Niles Canyon Railway operates along a portion of the First transcontinental railroad constructed in the 1860s. The rail line through Niles Canyon was amongst the earliest to be built in California and provided the first rail connection between San Francisco Bay and the rest of the nation.

=== Construction ===
The Pacific Railroad Act of 1862 authorized the Central Pacific Railroad and the Union Pacific Railroad to build the transcontinental railroad between the Missouri River and the waters of the Pacific. For various reasons, the Central Pacific Railroad reached an agreement with the first Western Pacific Railroad (1862-1870) (not related to the later company of same name) to build the westernmost portion of the line connecting the Central Pacific in Sacramento to San Jose via Stockton and Livermore. Trains could then continue to San Francisco via the San Francisco & San Jose Rail Road which was completed in 1864.

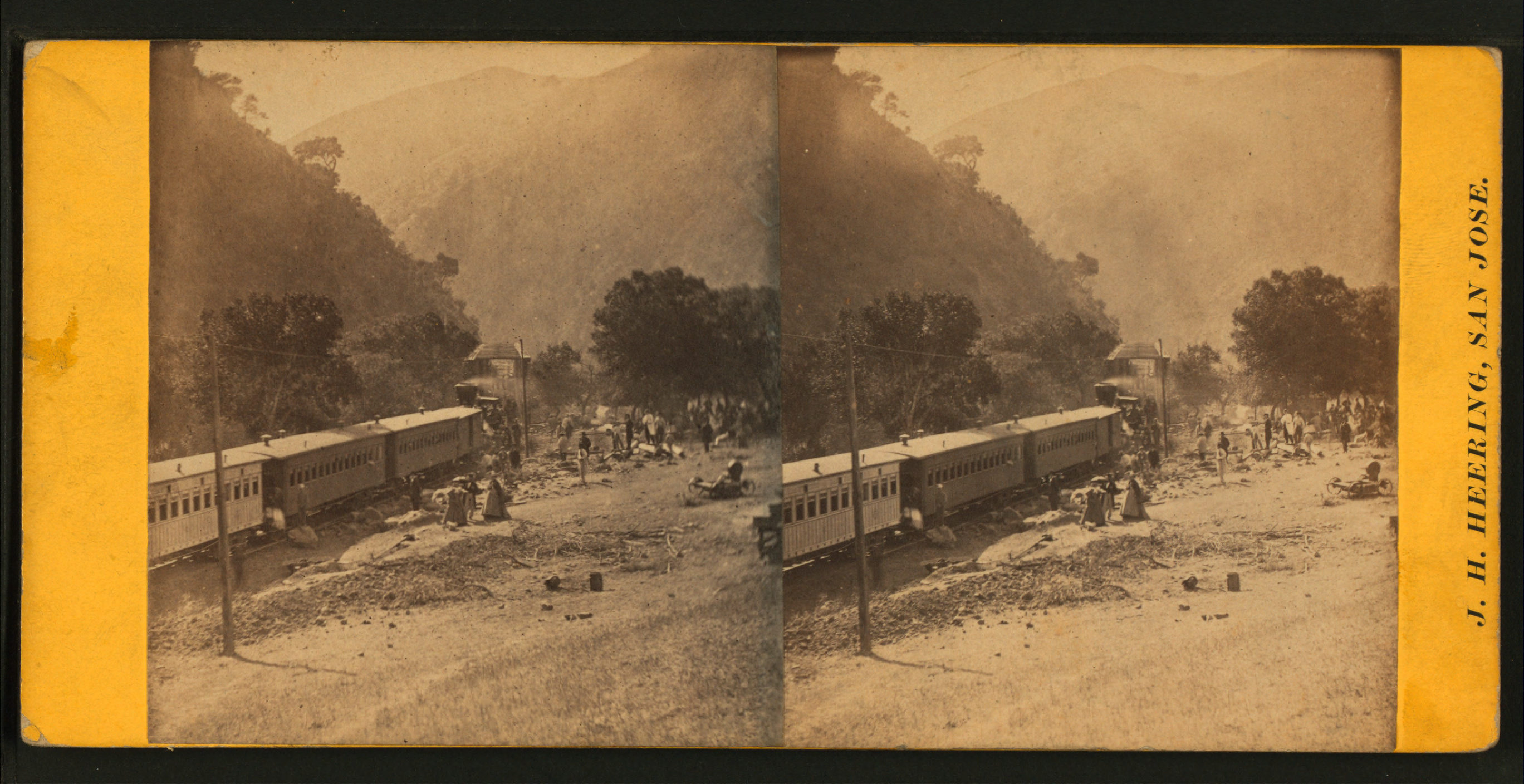
Farwell, California, ca1866, from Robert N. Dennis collection of stereoscopic views

By 1866, the Western Pacific had built 20 miles (32 km) of track north and east from San Jose, reaching halfway into what was then known as Alameda Cañon, to about Farwell near milepost 33. The Western Pacific used 500 Chinese laborers to grade and construct the rail line into the rugged canyon with its tight curves and narrow banks. Construction was then halted because of disagreements between the railroad's contractors and its financiers.

In 1869, the Central Pacific Railroad, a subsidiary of which had acquired the Western Pacific and Oakland Point in 1868, restarted work on the railroad line through Alameda Cañon in two opposite directions, both using Chinese laborers. In June 1869, J. H. Strobridge and crew began to lay out a new line starting at a point on the 1866 Western Pacific rails in the west end of Alameda Cañon (San Jose Junction at MP 30.6) westward out of the canyon towards Oakland, while Turton, Knox & Ryan dispatched workers to continue the railroad in Alameda Cañon eastward from the point where the 1866 Western Pacific rails abruptly stopped. Four major timber through (Howe) truss bridges were built to cross Alameda Creek and Arroyo de la Laguna Creek. In addition to building wooden bridges and grading the railroad bed, the laborers built culverts, retaining walls, and bridge piers in masonry. By mid-August 1869, the railroad was completed through Alameda Cañon eastward to Pleasanton and into Livermore Valley.

In September 1869, the railroad from Sacramento through Alameda Cañon to the waterfront Alameda Terminal at San Francisco Bay was completed. According to the Daily Alta California, the first Western Pacific train ran from Sacramento through the canyon on September 6, 1869, to a cheering crowd at Alameda Terminal, while a few cars switched off at the San Jose Junction for San Jose and Gilroy. This opening of a transcontinental railroad to the Pacific coast, as envisioned by the 1862 Pacific Railroad Act, came four months after the Central Pacific and Union Pacific met at Promontory Summit, Utah. On November 8, 1869, the intended western terminus opened at the Oakland Long Wharf, from which ferries connected to San Francisco. These ferries continued to be the final link for passengers to San Francisco until 1958.

At the mouth of Alameda Cañon was Vallejo Mills, and the San Jose Junction (MP 30.6) was located about a mile east, inside the narrow confines of the cañon. In late 1869 Central Pacific renamed the station for their railroad attorney and stockholder, Addison Niles, who later became associate justice on the California Supreme Court. In 1870 a connector was built just west of Vallejo Mills in the valley on the 1869 Central Pacific line to Oakland, connecting it to the original 1866 Western Pacific line to San Jose. On April 28, 1870, Central Pacific switched over from the San Jose Junction in the cañon to the new jusnction (MP 29.2) in the valley, Niles. There at the junction in the valley, Central Pacific added a roundhouse and a train depot, complete with a restaurant and saloon for the convenience of the train passengers transferring there. Shortly thereafter, the Vallejo Mills settlement around MP 29.2 became known as Niles, which has become since 1956 a district within the city of Fremont. Likewise, Alameda Cañon thereafter became known as Niles Canyon.

=== Railroad use ===
When built, the rail line through Niles Canyon was the primary route for overland traffic to and from the San Francisco Bay. A shorter rail line between Oakland and Sacramento was established via the California Pacific Railroad and a train ferry at Benicia by 1879. As a result, the original line became less used due to its longer route and its steep grade over Livermore Pass (known today as Altamont Pass). Passenger and freight trains on the line was reduced to local service only. This secondary status was maintained until the early 20th century when the Southern Pacific Railroad (successor to the Central Pacific) came under the leadership of E. H. Harriman. Freight traffic in and out of San Francisco had become too heavy for the ferries across the bay and across the Carquinez Strait to handle. An all land route via San Jose and Niles Canyon was available, but was overly circuitous. Several major capital improvement projects undertaken during this era, including the completion of the Coast Line and the construction of the Dumbarton Bridge, revitalized the original line through Niles Canyon. Steel bridges replaced the covered timber bridges at Farwell and Dresser and the small railroad town of Niles became an important junction as freight from the San Francisco Peninsula and produce from the Santa Clara and Salinas Valleys traveled through the canyon to points east. Despite these improvements, the few rebuilding programs by the railroad left the Niles Canyon line with many of its original cut-stone bridge abutments, culverts, and retaining walls from the Western Pacific's original right of way. Many of these stonework built by Chinese laborers in the late 1860s can still be seen today.

=== Preservation ===
The decline in San Francisco's status as a port with the advent of containerization, combined with the movement of produce traffic to the highways once again left the railroad through Niles Canyon with little business. Southern Pacific ceased its operations through the canyon in 1984, and deeded the land to Alameda County; the portion over Altamont Pass was briefly reopened in 1985 for "scab trains" to train management crews ahead of a possible union strike. Commercial rail operations through Niles Canyon now operate on a newer line, which is owned by Union Pacific (formerly Western Pacific) and also used by the Altamont Corridor Express (ACE) commuter train.

The Pacific Locomotive Association leased the right of way from the county and began working to reconstruct the track in 1987. The Niles Canyon Railway ran its first passenger train from Sunol on May 21, 1988. Passenger trains once again connected Sunol and Niles starting on April 9, 2006. The organization continues its work to extend and maintain the track along the line; restore its collection of railroad equipment; and operate historic demonstration trains for the benefit of the public. They plan to eventually extend their demonstration train service to Pleasanton, California.

== Niles Canyon Transcontinental Railroad Historic District ==
The railway, its right-of-way, and its associated structures were listed on the National Register of Historic Places as the Niles Canyon Transcontinental Railroad Historic District on October 13, 2010. The railway was determined to be eligible under National Register Criterion C to reflect the engineering significance of the resources as fine examples of historic period railroad design, and under Criterion A to reflect its association with the construction of the Original Transcontinental Railroad and its role as an important freight railway in the early part of the 20th century.

The Period of Significance was identified as spanning from 1865 to 1958. This period was chosen to encompass the commencement of construction of this portion of the Transcontinental Railroad in 1865 to the end of its significance as a major transportation corridor after World War II and the final incorporation of the Central Pacific Railroad into the Southern Pacific Railroad in 1958.

The historic district includes 108 contributing resources and 39 non-contributing resources. Contributing resources consist of every object within the railroad's right of way constructed between 1865 and 1958. These include the track itself, the graded roadbed, culverts, bridges, signals, telegraph and signal pole lines, structures, signs, and fences. Non-contributing resources consist of things built or altered since 1958, and include non-historic track, buildings, a gas pipeline, and a fiber optic line.

The primary contributing resources of this Historic District include the following:

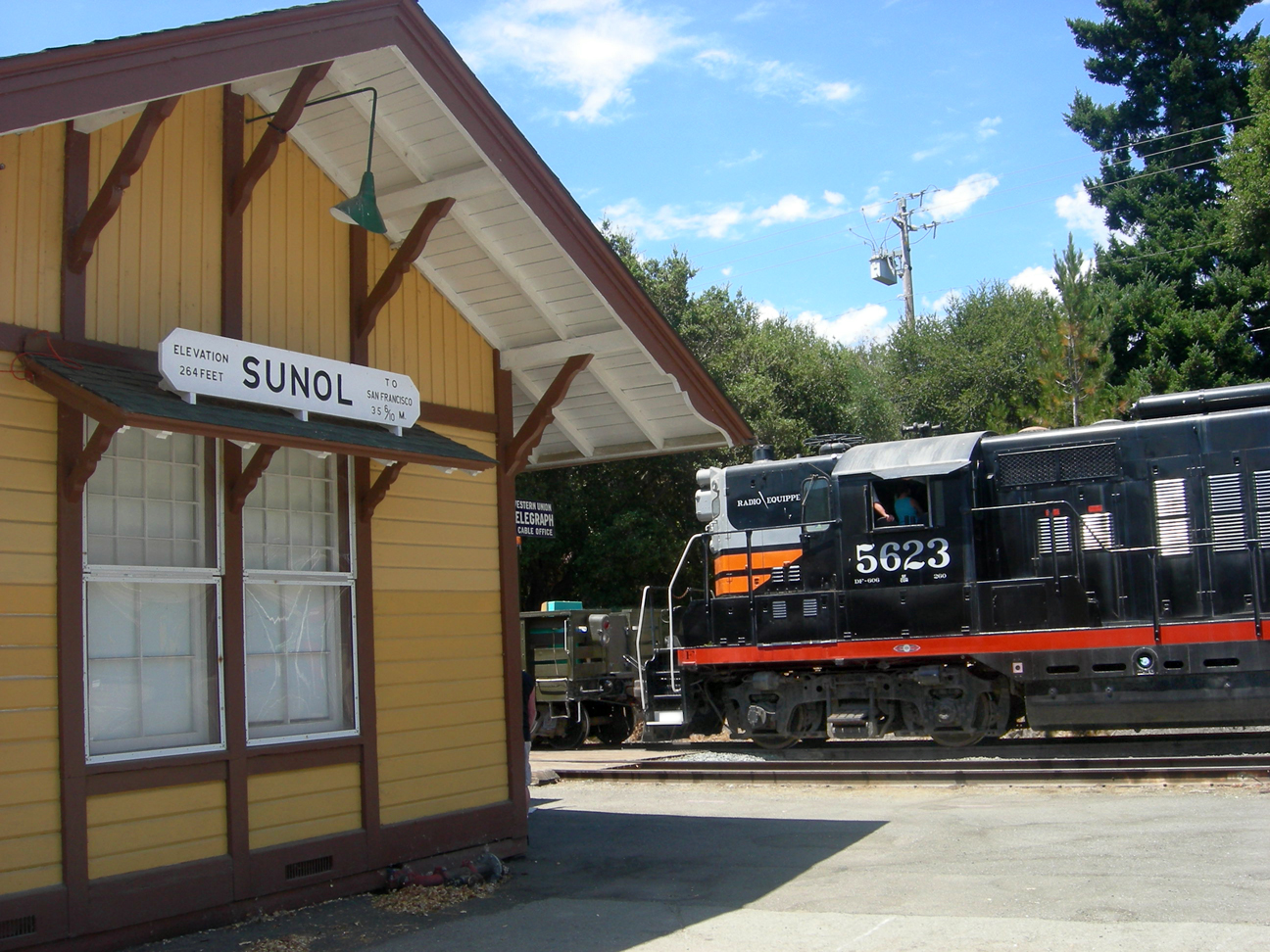
Sunol Depot at MP 35.6

- Sunol Depot This one-story Stick style depot was built to Southern Pacific standard design No. 7 in 1884. Railroads such as the SPRR created standard depot designs to serve the many towns along its lines and represents an early application of standard architectural designs on a large scale. More than economical, this standardization created a predictable experience for employees and customers, and contributed to the company's branding. A “combination depot” such as this housed facilities for a company agent, freight and passengers in one building and were designed to serve small towns such as Sunol. Out of at least eleven No. 7 depots built by the railroad, Sunol is the last one remaining. It is 19 feet wide and 67 feet long. The roof is divided into two parts with a gable roof over the east end, and an elevated hip roof over the freight room to the west. Decorative scroll cut brackets supported the eaves and similar bargeboards adorn the east gable end. The depot is divided into a series of rooms to serve a variety of functions. Starting from the east, the first room is the passenger waiting room. The agents office is next to the west and features a five-window bay on the track side from which the company's agent would conduct business related to train operations. This room also contained a public counter at which business could be conducted with shippers, and a small ticket window connects this office with the passenger waiting room. The next room was the baggage room and is currently used for storage. Finally, the freight room takes up the rest of the building and is set about forty inches above grade so that its floor would be level with the floor of freight cars and teamsters’ wagons. This room is now used for exhibits and meetings. The freight room had been surrounded on three sides by a freight platform to facilitate the loading and unloading of freight from rail cars that would have been positioned next to this platform. A track had been located north of the building between the platform and the mainline for this purpose.
- Dresser Bridge The current bridge is a four-span structure, which features two early U.S. examples of riveted Warren through truss structures. The current superstructure was manufactured in 1906 by the American Bridge Company to replace the second wood truss at this location, which had been constructed in 1893. The original bridge at this location was completed in 1866 and consisted of two wooden Howe trusses. The original coursed-ashlar sandstone piers from 1865–66 are still in use and have been supplemented by concrete piers from 1893 and 1906. The bridge consists of two 125 ft. through Warren trusses and two 60 ft. deck plate girder spans with one at each end of the bridge. The abutments and piers are angled parallel to the course of the river below and are not perpendicular to the railroad's alignment. As a result, the bridge spans are laterally offset from one another.

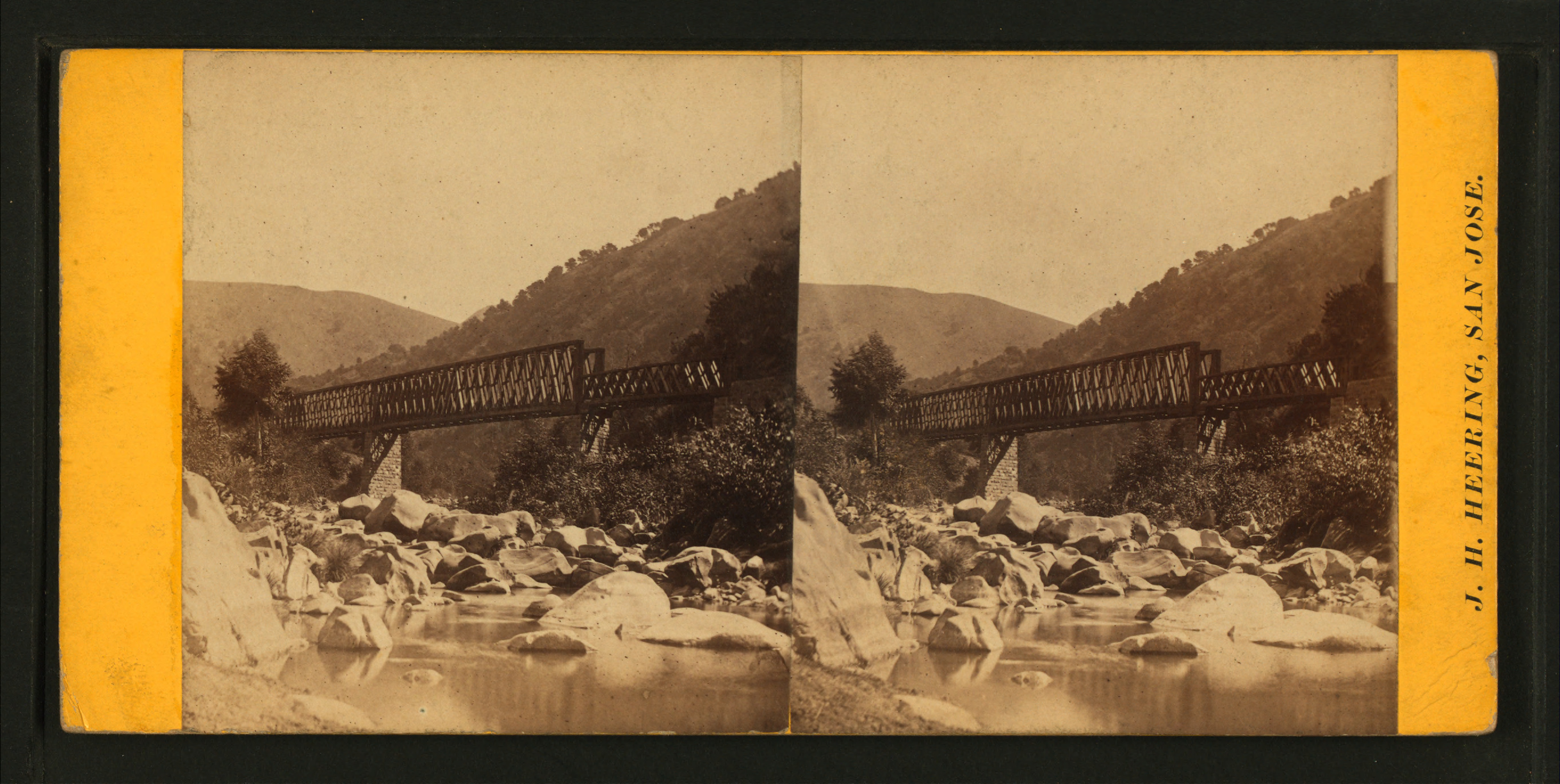
Farwell Bridge across Alameda Creek, California, ca1866, from Robert N. Dennis collection of stereoscopic views

- Farwell Bridge This bridge consists of the primary 196 ft. Pratt through pin-connected truss manufactured by Edge Moor Bridge Works in 1896, a 98 ft. Warren through pin-connected pony truss, three 30 ft deck plate spans from 1907, and a 70’ deck plate girder span from 1932. The original bridge at this location was also a single-span covered wooden Howe truss similar to the spans at Dresser. Stonework for two of the bridge's piers dates to the original construction in 1865–66 while later concrete piers and abutments were added in 1896, 1907, and 1932. Caltrans encased the original eastern pier in steel and concrete in the 2000s to protect the highway below in the event of an earthquake. As at Dresser, the piers are at an angle to the bridge, and the spans are offset as a result.
- Arroyo de la Laguna Bridge Near the station of Bonita, this is a riveted through plate girder structure of five spans, which replaced the original covered Howe truss in 1899. The stone abutments and two of the piers date from the initial construction. This bridge consists of three 101 ft. and two 86 ft. through plate girder spans. Two additional concrete piers were added in 1899 to reduce the length of the new bridge spans.

== Rail excursions ==
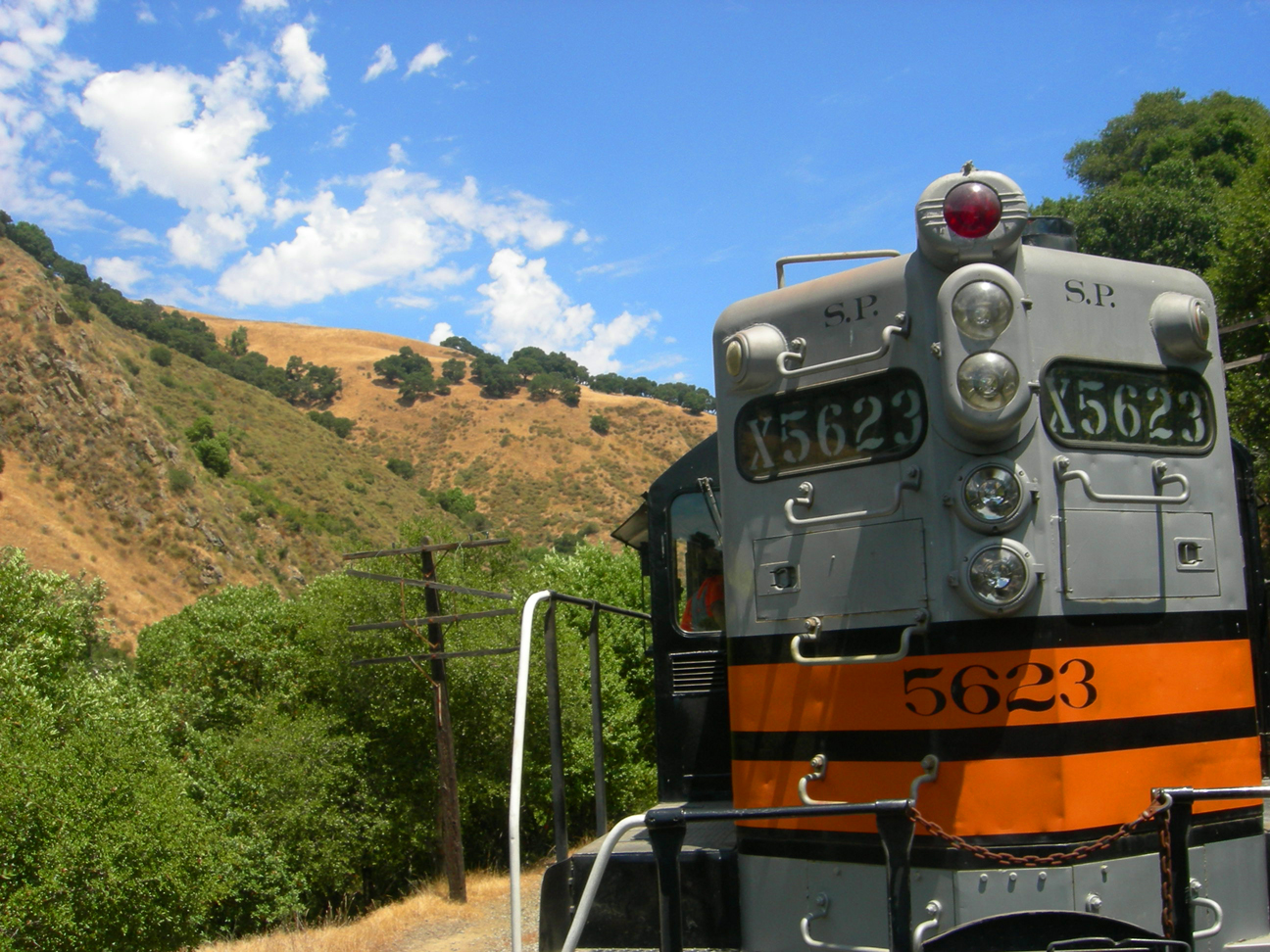
SP 5623 on the NCRy

The railway offers regularly scheduled excursion service throughout the year, as well as special charter trains on an ad-hoc basis.

=== Weekend Operations ===
As of 2025, round-trip excursions depart from the historic depot in Sunol to Niles and back, on the second and third weekends of the month from March through October. There are two departures each day, at 10:30 AM and 1:00 PM. On rare occasions, the train will run the opposite route and depart from Niles instead of Sunol.

The train travels west through Niles Canyon to the Niles station site adjacent to the Union Pacific Coast Line on which Amtrak operates their Capitol Corridor service. The unrelated Niles Depot Museum displays model railroads and railroad artifacts nearby. There is no disembarkation at the halfway point; all passengers remain on the train for the return to the original depot. The engine is disconnected from the train and "run around" on a siding track to the opposite end, where it is connected for the return journey east.

Trains running on Saturday are pulled by diesel locomotives, with both open and enclosed passenger cars. Trains running on Sunday are pulled by steam locomotives during the spring (start of operations until May) and the fall (September and October), with diesel locomotives substituted during the summer months. All trains feature a commissary, or "snack bar" car which sells refreshments and also has two restrooms onboard.

=== Train of Lights ===
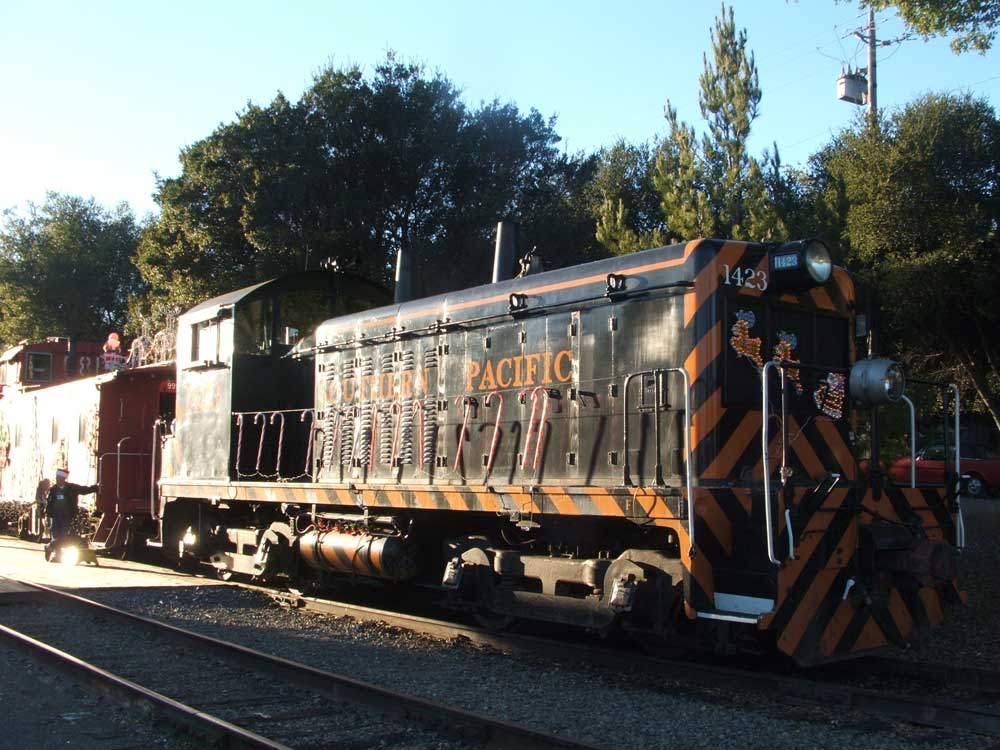
Train of Lights, 2006.

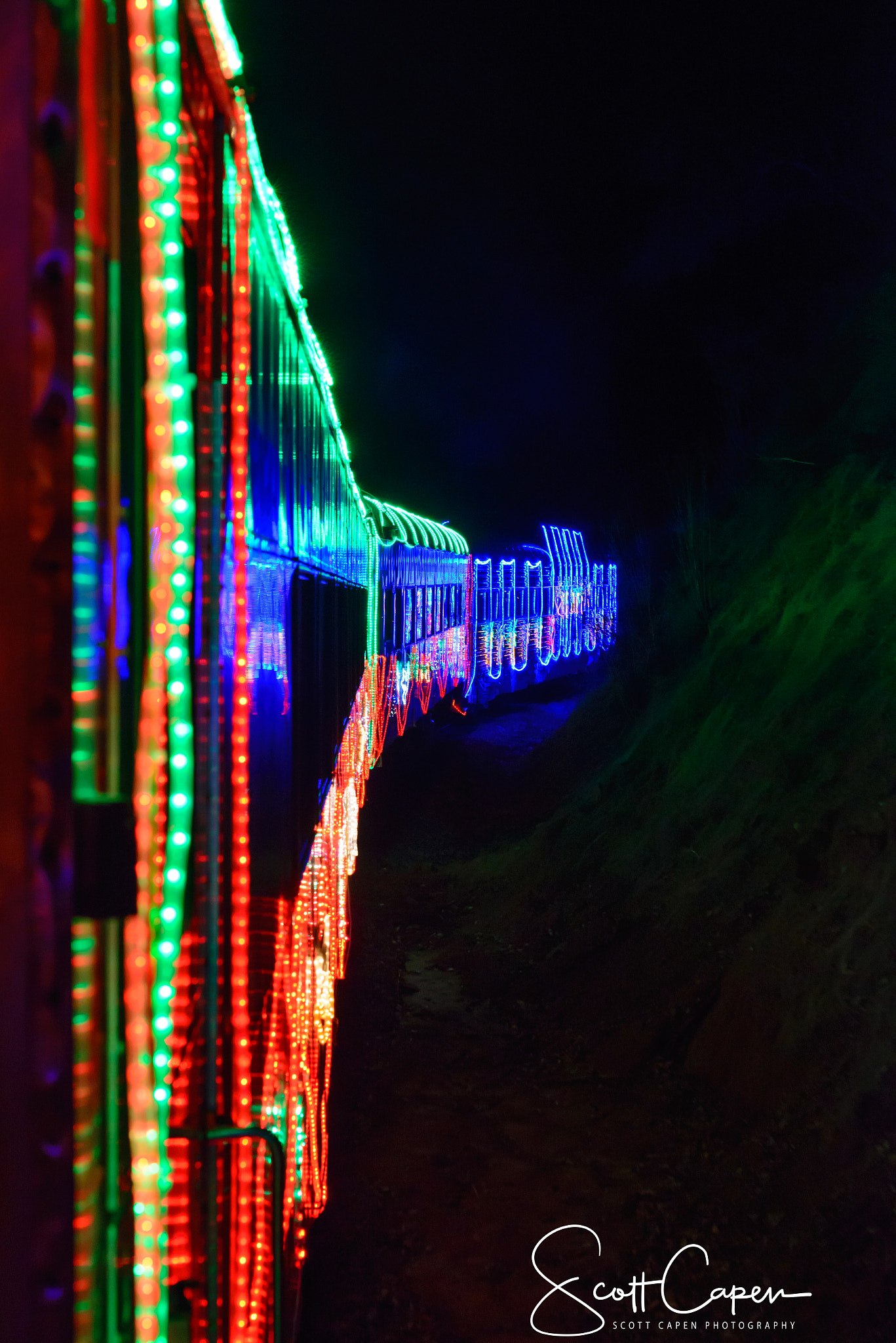
Train Of Lights, by Scott Capen, 2017.

The railway runs a special holiday train called the "Train of Lights" at the end of each year. The all-volunteer workforce begins decorating the interior and exterior of the train cars in the early fall. As of 2025, the Train of Lights consist is over 1,000 feet in length and features sixteen enclosed and open-air passenger cars, including two cabooses. One of the railway's historic diesel locomotives is placed on each end of the train.

The Train of Lights runs from the weekend before Thanksgiving until the end of December. Trains run on average three to four nights per week during that period, with two departures each night. The 4:30pm departure leaves from the Niles station and runs east through the canyon to Sunol, before reversing direction and returning to Niles. The train then makes a deadhead move back up the canyon for the 7:30pm departure from Sunol.

== Railroad equipment ==
The Pacific Locomotive Association has, as of 2022, 10 steam and 13 diesel locomotives, and over 40 pieces of rolling stock. There have been many visitors over the years. Previously, the Golden Gate Railroad Museum moved its collection from San Francisco to the NCRy in 2007 for storage and limited operations after their home at Hunters Point Naval Shipyard was shut down for redevelopment. The Golden Gate Railroad Museum announced their departure from the Niles Canyon Railway in Spring 2015, and moved three locomotives to the Northwestern Pacific Railroad in March 2020. In July 2021, plans were announced to move Southern Pacific steam locomotive 2479, a water tower, a round house and turntable from the California Trolley and Railroad Corporation to the NCRy.

=== Locomotives ===
Locomotive details (Note: Attributed to multiple sources:)
Name	Image	Type	Built	Builder	Status
2		2-6-2T	1924	American Locomotive Company	Stored
3		2-6-2T	1927	American Locomotive Company	Operational
4		2-6-6-2T	1924	Baldwin Locomotive Works	Operational
5		3 truck Heisler	1913	Heisler Locomotive Works	Stored
12		3 truck Shay	1903	Lima Locomotive Works	Stored
30		2-6-2	1922	Baldwin Locomotive Works	Under restoration
1269		0-6-0	1921	Southern Pacific Railroad	Stored
1744		2-6-0	1901	Baldwin Locomotive Works	Under restoration
2479		4-6-2	1923	Baldwin Locomotive Works	Under restoration
462		44-ton switcher	1943	General Electric	Stored
101		DS-4-4-1000	1948	Baldwin Locomotive Works	Stored
1218		S-6	1955	American Locomotive Company	Under restoration
1423		NW2	1949	Electro-Motive Division	Operational
5472		SD9	1956	Electro-Motive Division	Operational
5623		GP9	1955	Electro-Motive Division	Operational
9010		ML-4000	1964	Krauss-Maffei	Operational
1856		H-12-44	1953	Fairbanks-Morse	Operational
7348		65-ton switcher	1942	General Electric	Operational
713		GP7	1953	Electro-Motive Division	Operational
918D		F7	1950	Electro-Motive Division	Operational
1195		SW900	1954	Electro-Motive Division	Operational

=== Visiting locomotives ===
Locomotive details
Number	Image	Type	Works number	Built	Builder	Status	Notes
7		2-4-4-2 Mallet	33463	1909	Baldwin Locomotive Works	Operational	Built for the Little River Railroad (Tennessee) No. 126, later Deep River Logging Co. #7, also known as "The Skookum". On loan from the Roots of Motive Power Museum in Willits, California.
7		2-6-2T	34666	1910	Baldwin Locomotive Works	Operational	Built for the Black Hills and Northwestern Railroad, a subsidiary of the Mason County Logging Company, later Port of Olympia. Occasional visitor from the Roots of Motive Power Museum in Willits, California.
2		0-4-0T	4390	1909	H.K. Porter, Inc.	Operational	Built for the Santa Cruz Portland Cement Company, later Bechtel Kaiser Rock Company, later Henry J. Kaiser Rock Company. Occasional visitor courtesy of the Pappas family.

=== Passenger cars ===
Interior views

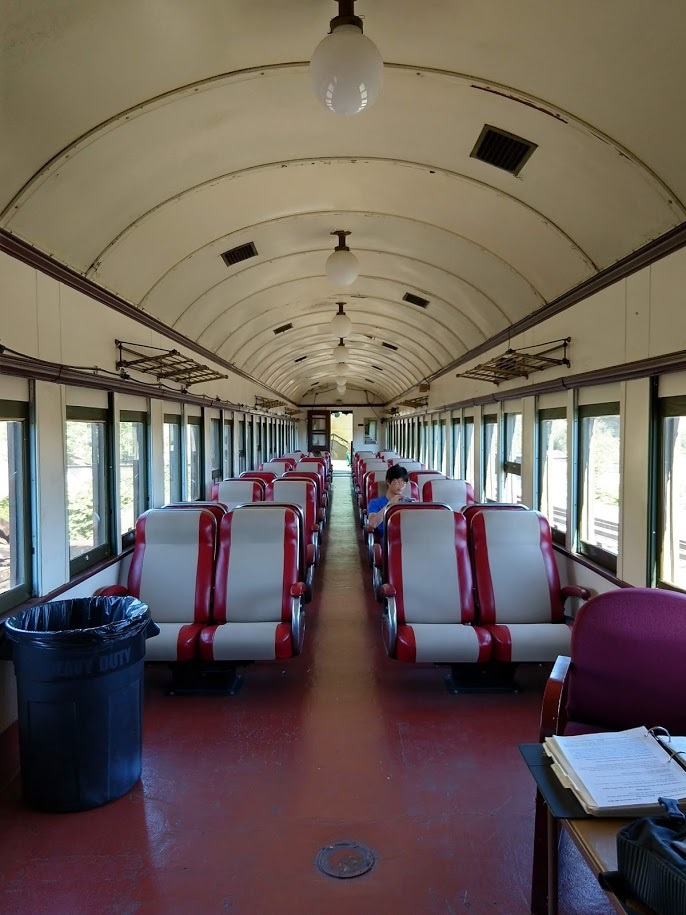

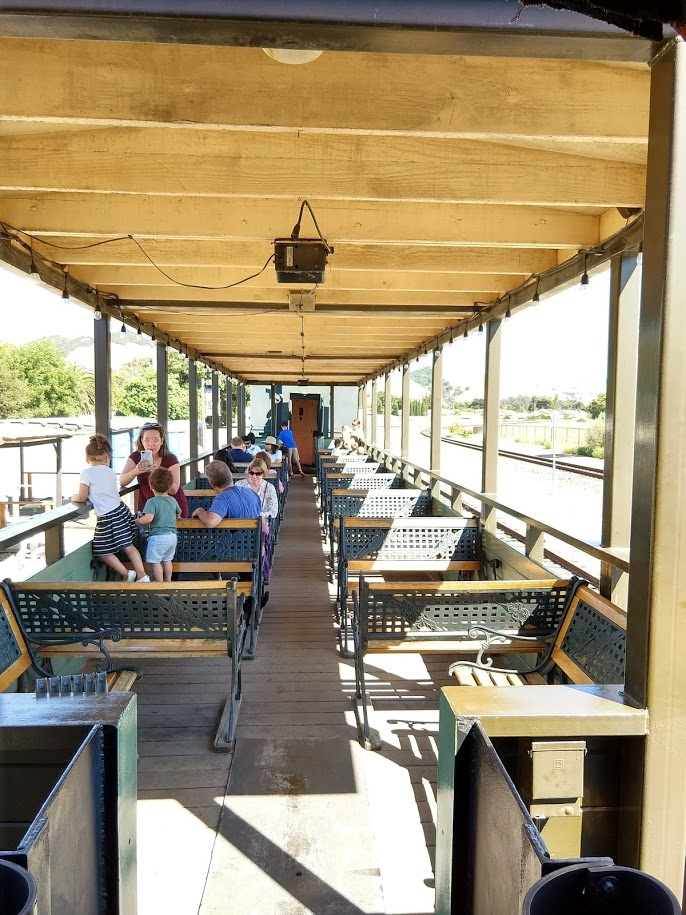

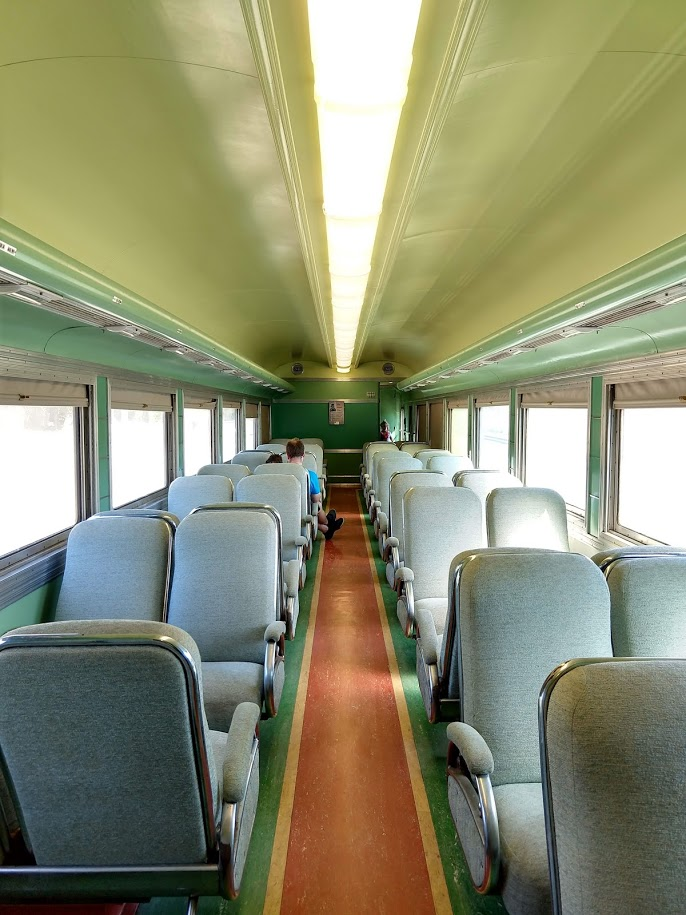

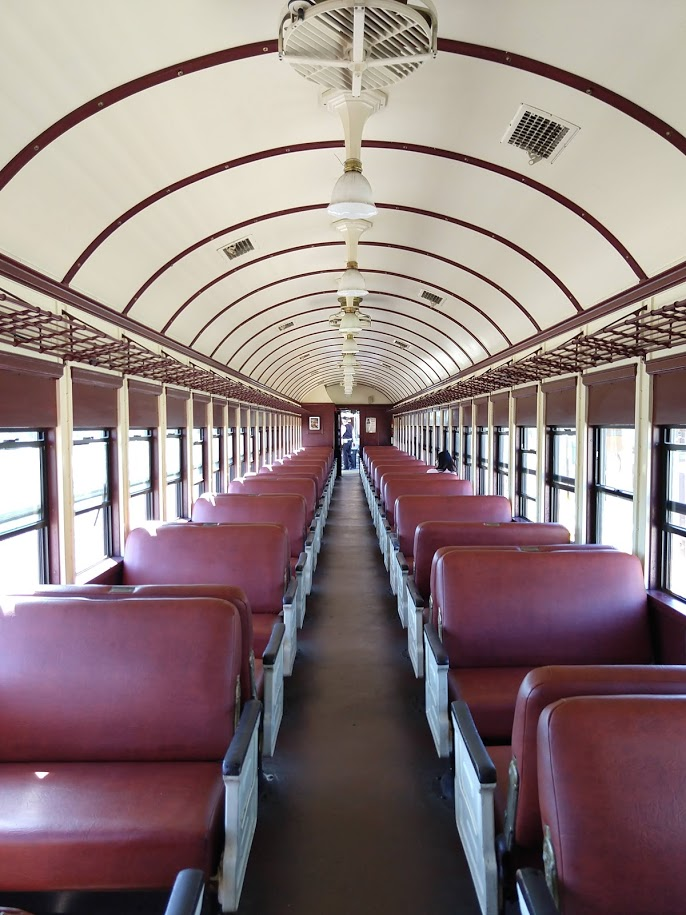

== See also ==
- List of heritage railways
- List of California railroads
- List of San Francisco Bay Area trains
