= San Francisco Railway Museum =

Railway museum in California, US

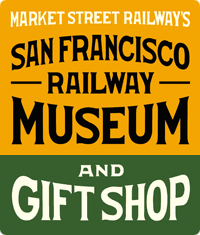

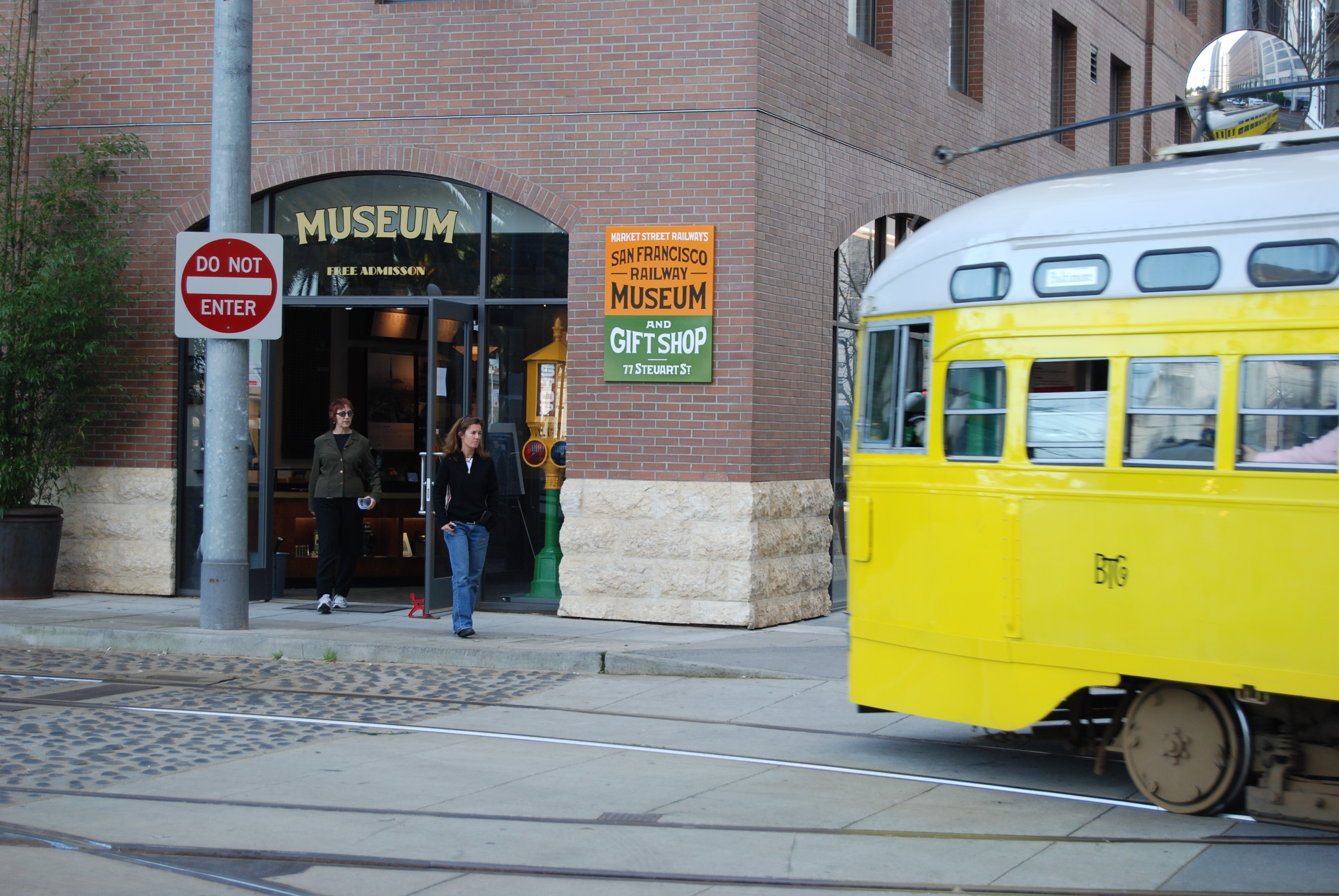
- A streetcar about to pass the museum entrance on Steuart Street
- Established: 2006
- Location: 77 Steuart St, San Francisco, CA 94105, USA
- Coordinates: 37.79382°N 122.39361°W
- Type: Railway museum
- Website: http://www.streetcar.org/museum/

The San Francisco Railway Museum is a local railway museum located in the South of Market area of San Francisco.

This small museum features exhibits on the antique streetcars of the F Market & Wharves and national landmark cable cars that continue to run along the city's major arteries. The museum is located at the Don Chee Way and Steuart Station, across the street from the Ferry Building. Admission to the museum is free.

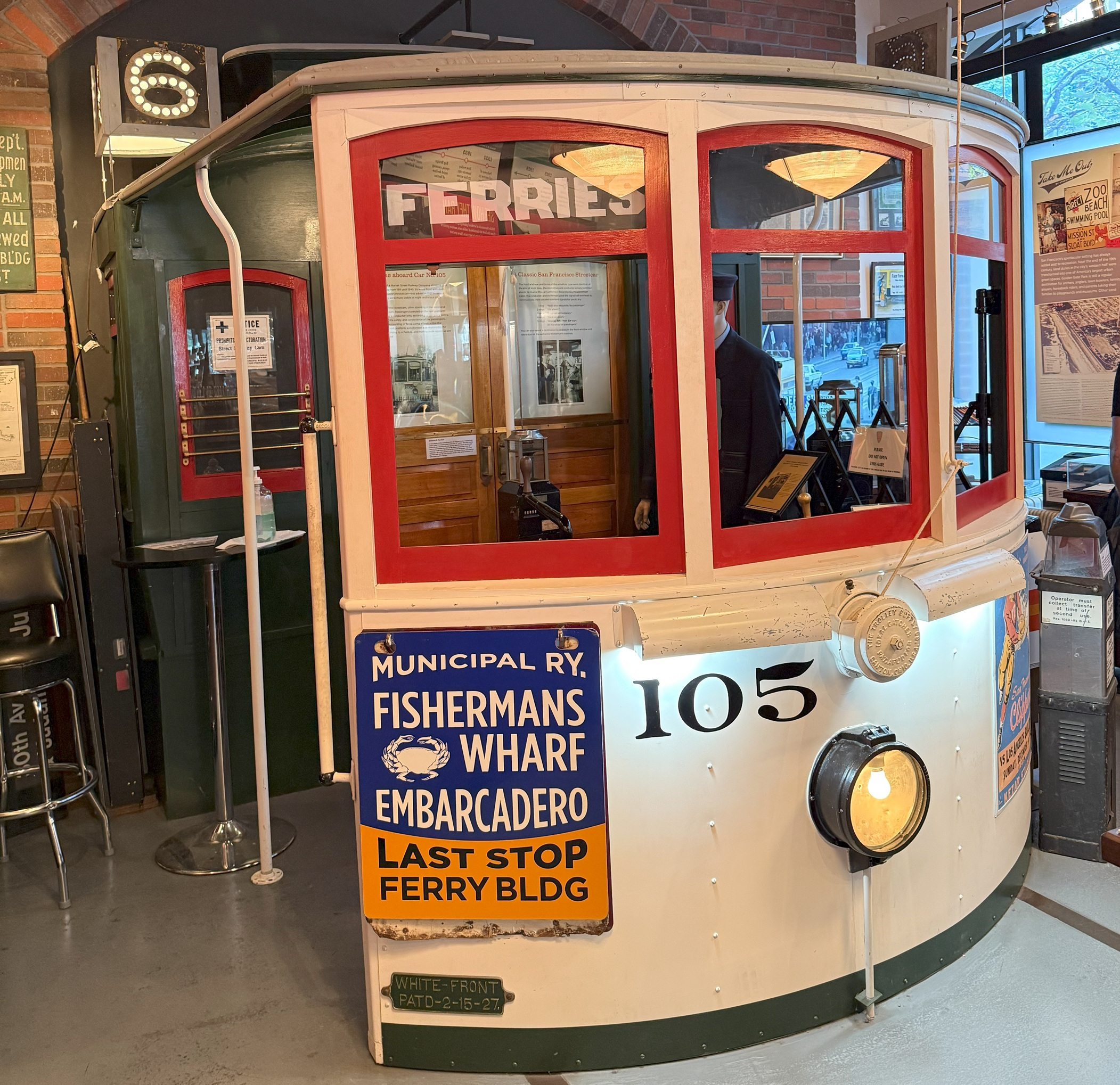
The replica of Car No. 105

In addition to the permanent collection of San Francisco railway artifacts from Market Street Railway Company and San Francisco Municipal Railway, the museum features exhibits such as a retrospective on the 1906 earthquake and a replicated end of the now extinct MSR '100-Class streetcar'.

The museum is a project of the nonprofit Market Street Railway, Muni's historic transportation advocacy group and was opened on October 7, 2006.

== See also ==
- List of San Francisco Bay Area trains
- San Francisco Cable Car Museum
