= Krauss-Maffei ML 4000 =

Diesel–hydraulic locomotive

Krauss-Maffei ML-4000
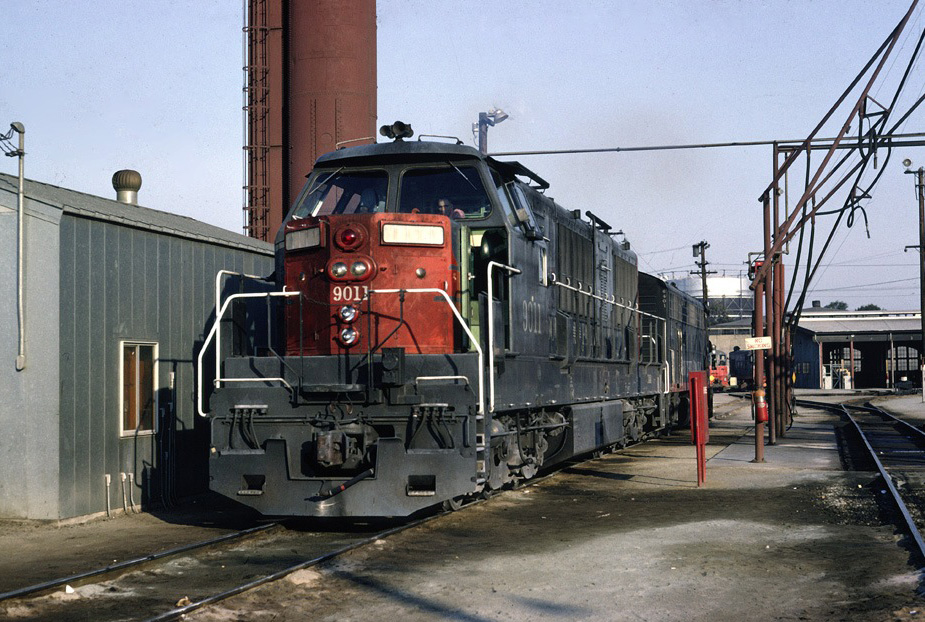
- SP 9011 at San Jose, August 1964
Type and origin
- Power type: Diesel–hydraulic
- Builder: Krauss-Maffei
- Model: ML-4000
- Build date: 1961–1969
- Total produced: 21 North America, 16 South America
Specifications
- Configuration
  - AAR: C-C
  - UIC: C′C′
- Gauge: 4 ft 8 1/2 in (1,435 mm) (USA); 1,000 mm (3 ft 3 3/8 in) (Brazil)
- Length: 67 ft 7.625 in (20.62 m)
- Loco weight: 344,000 lb (156 t)
- Prime mover: Two Maybach MD870 V16s
- Engine type: Four stroke diesel
- Aspiration: Turbocharger
- Cylinders: 32 (two V16s)
- Cylinder size: 7.28 inches (18.5 cm) bore × 7.89 inches (20.0 cm) stroke
- Transmission: Voith L830rU hydraulic
- Loco brake: Schedule 26L air
Performance figures
- Maximum speed: 70 mph (110 km/h)
- Power output: 3,540 hp (2,640 kW) (Germany), 3,540 hp (2,640 kW) (USA)
Career
- Operators: Southern Pacific Railroad, Denver and Rio Grande Western Railroad, Estrada de Ferro Vitória a Minas
- Nicknames: (Damned) Krauts, Amerika-loks, Amilok, Ami
- Locale: North America, Brazil
- Retired: 1968 (SP and D&RGW units), 1980 (EFVM units)
- Preserved: SP 9010
- Disposition: One preserved, remainder scrapped

The Krauss-Maffei ML 4000 is a diesel–hydraulic locomotive, built between 1961 and 1969 by German manufacturer Krauss-Maffei in Munich, Germany. It generated 3,540 horsepower (2,640 kW) from two Maybach V16 engines. 37 examples were built in total, for two North American railroads and one South American railroad. They had a short service life and the US examples were withdrawn in 1967–1968.

== History ==
In 1959, General Motors' Electro-Motive Division (EMD) rebuilt nine of its GP9 locomotives for the Union Pacific Railroad with pre-production examples of a new turbo-supercharging system that would raise the locomotives' horsepower to 2000. This soon evolved into the GP20. This supplemented the UP's fleet of powerful gas turbine GTEL locomotives, the most recent batch of which could output 8500 horsepower.

The Southern Pacific Railroad (who served much of the same territory as UP, a rival) took this into account, as business for SP was growing rapidly. Freight trains were getting longer and heavier, and SP had to use up to 10 locomotives to power long-distance freight trains. SP's main workhorses at the time were EMD F7s and GP9s. Although SP had a small fleet of 2,400 horsepower (1,800 kW) H-24-66 Train Master locomotives manufactured by Fairbanks-Morse, SP found that they were not suitable for freight service and were relegated to the San Francisco Bay Area's Peninsula Commutes.

After much research, the Southern Pacific found that using many diesel–electric locomotives with continual high stress on the traction motors wore out the electrical equipment. SP decided to experiment with diesel–hydraulic locomotives and stunned the railroad industry by purchasing three 3,540 horsepower (2,640 kW) ML-4000 type locomotives from German manufacturer Krauss-Maffei. Delivered by ship and unloaded at the Port of Houston, Texas, on October 31, 1961, they featured two Maybach V16 1,770 horsepower (1,320 kW) diesel engines and Voith transmissions. The Denver and Rio Grande Western Railroad also ordered three units, but found them unsuitable in mountain service, and they were sold to the SP in early 1964. Upon arrival, a special track was set up at the locomotive shops in Roseville, California, just for servicing the ML-4000s.

The first order of the ML-4000s are referred to as cab units, given that they have a fully enclosed car body, similar to that of the EMD F-unit. Following extensive testing SP returned to Krauss-Maffei for an additional fifteen units. Delivered in 1964, they featured the same engines and transmissions but looked very different on the outside. These are referred to as hood units because of their hood type bodies.

SP found the ML-4000s unsatisfactory in service over the Sierra Nevada mountain range, so they were relegated to service in flat territory throughout California, often paired with F7s or GP9s. The locomotives were fairly reliable, with only one recorded failure. Upon ordering the second batch of ML-4000s, SP also purchased three DH643 diesel–hydraulic locomotives from Alco.

== Disposition ==
American locomotive technology began to catch up in the late 1960s, and the operation of diesel–hydraulic locomotives, while useful, was no longer justifiable. SP and other railroads had made their horsepower needs known and American builders responded by increasing horsepower on single-engine locomotives. In 1966, SP first ordered the EMD SD40 and SD45 locomotives from EMD. These new EMD locomotives, along with the U30C and U33Cs from General Electric, quickly became the new high-horsepower units of choice. In 1967, a deadline of ML-4000 cab units appeared at the Sacramento Locomotive Works. Hood units soon followed in the deadline, and the first ML-4000s were retired in September of that year.

The Pacific Locomotive Association (the organization that operates the Niles Canyon Railway) came to SP with a request of a diesel–hydraulic–powered railfan passenger excursion, preferably with an ML-4000 cab unit. However, the cab units were no longer operational, so hood unit number 9120 along with a pair of EMD FP7s powered a series of railfan passenger excursions in the spring of 1967, the only time an ML-4000 was used in passenger service. On February 13, 1968, SP announced the end of its diesel–hydraulic locomotive program. By the end of the year, all ML-4000s had been retired. The trio of ALCO diesel–hydraulics fared slightly better, and were not retired until 1973. The powered trucks were salvaged from some of the scrapped ML 4000's and sold to Plasser & Theurer, where they were installed on that company's self-propelled ballast cleaners.

== The camera car ==
Before the end of 1968, all but one of the ML 4000s were scrapped at Sacramento. The survivor, number 9113 (originally numbered 9010) was converted into a camera car between 1968 and 1969 at the Sacramento Locomotive Works. It emerged as SPMW #1, but was later renumbered SPMW 1166 due to SP's traffic computer requiring 4 digits. In June 1969, it was finally renumbered to SP 8799. Its purpose was to record films for a computerized locomotive simulator for engineer training. The most drastic change in appearance was the locomotive's short hood (or nose). It was completely rebuilt to house camera equipment and heavy, thick steel was used for collision protection. The front transmission was removed to house a generator to power the camera equipment. The generator drew fuel from the locomotive's original fuel tank. The two engines and rear transmission, though disabled, remained in the engine for weight. All of the controls remained in the cab so that it could control a locomotive pushing behind it, much like a cab car is used on a commuter train. The camera car could be put on the lead of any train, but it mostly made special trips with just one locomotive behind it for power. SP 8799 was based in SP's West Colton Yard in Southern California until it was retired in 1984.

== The Brazilian ML-4000s ==
Estrada de Ferro Vitória a Minas of Brazil ordered four units built to meter gauge in 1966. An additional 12 units were built in 1969. They were the most powerful locomotives for use in meter gauge at that time. Although they had problems with traction (they would sometimes slip on the rails, practically burning them), they stayed in service until the 1980s with the arrival of the EMD DDM45. All of them were scrapped.

== Original buyers ==
Railroad	Quantity	Road numbers	Notes
Denver and Rio Grande Western Railroad	3	4001–4003	Cab units; sold to Southern Pacific 9021–9023, later SP 9103–9105
Southern Pacific Company	3	9000–9002	Cab units; renumbered 9100-9102
Southern Pacific Company	15	9003–9017	Hood units; renumbered 9106-9120
Estrada de Ferro Vitória a Minas (EFVM)	16	701–716	Hood units

== Preservation ==
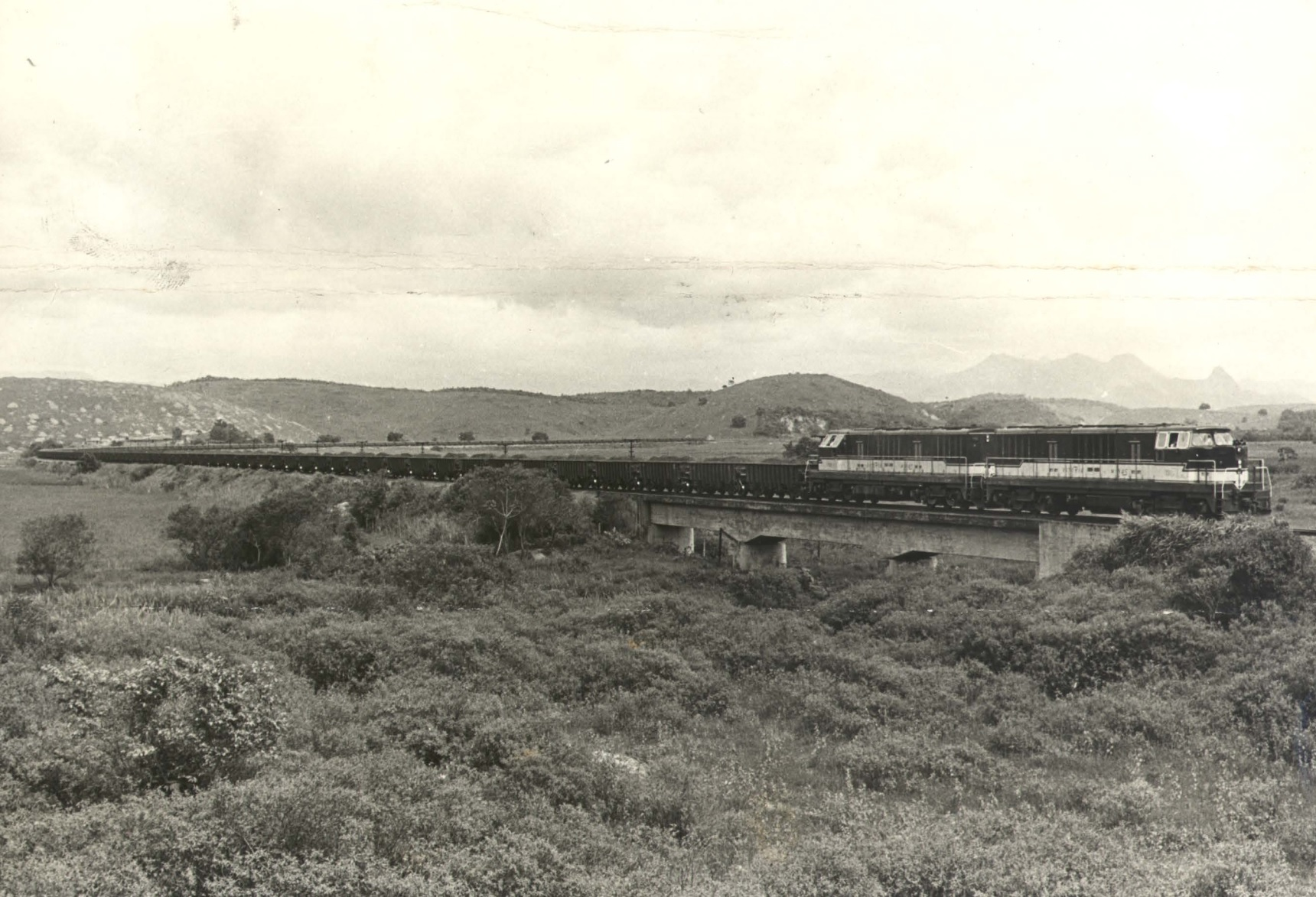
Two of EFVM's hood units hauling a 150-car-long iron train, December 1968

SP camera car 8799 was donated to the California State Railroad Museum in Sacramento in 1986. Initially, the museum removed its nose for the purpose of having a new nose built to replicate the nose that it had while it was a locomotive as part of its plan for restoration. However, that restoration never came. It sat in outdoor storage in a very forlorn state at the Sacramento Locomotive Works until it was sold to the Pacific Locomotive Association (PLA), along with several pieces of rolling stock. They were moved by the Union Pacific Railroad in summer 2008 from Sacramento to their interchange with Niles Canyon Railway at Hearst in Sunol, California. The Niles Canyon Railway then transferred it to its Brightside Yard, where it was restored by volunteers of the PLA. Initial plans called for cosmetic restoration, including building a replica of the locomotive's original nose, and returning the locomotive to its original number, 9010.

In 2013 the PLA was able to obtain a set of Krauss Maffei trucks from a retired Plasser and Theurer ballast cleaning machine from France. In 2015, they purchased replacement cardan shafts made by the Welte group in Germany. These two developments meant that if the rear Maybach could be made operational that it would be possible for SP 9010 to operate under its own power. On February 14, 2017, the rear MD870 Maybach V-16 diesel engine was successfully started after being unused for 48 years. It ran for about 16 minutes; the engine was turned off, then turned back on for 2 minutes with no problems both static runs, and with a clean exhaust. On March 1, 2017, SP 9010 operated under its own power for the first time, on the Niles Canyon Railway. Finally, on July 20, 2019, No. 9010 made its excursion debut on the railway.
