= Don Chee Way and Steuart station =

Streetcar stop in San Francisco

Don Chee Way and Steuart
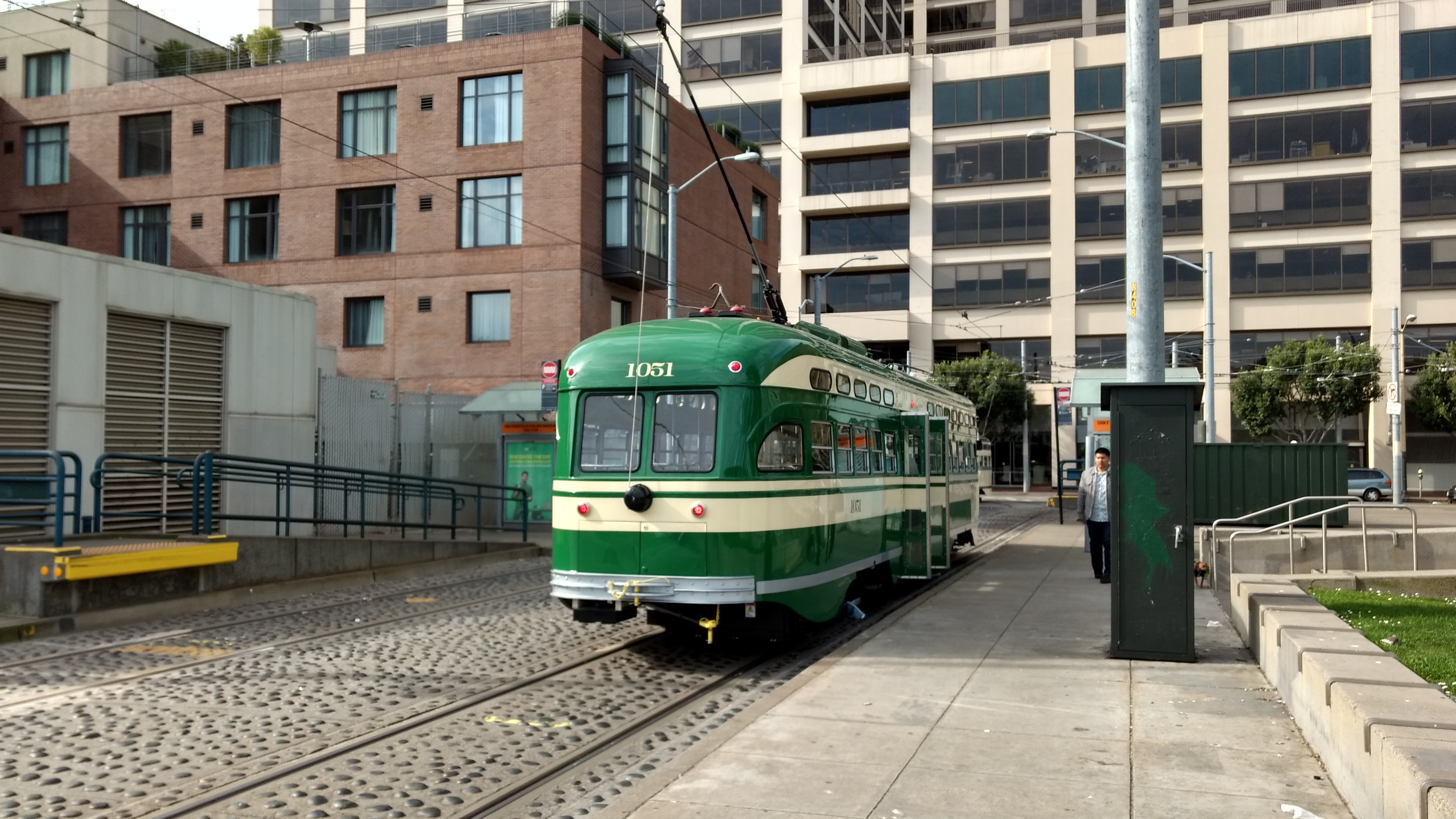
- Streetcar at Don Chee Way and Steuart in March 2017

General information
- Location: Don Chee Way at Steuart Street; San Francisco, California
- Coordinates: 37°47′38.79″N 122°23′37.78″W
- Platforms: 2 side platforms
- Tracks: 2
- Connections: Muni: 6, 7X, 9, 14, 14X, 21, 31

Construction
- Accessible: Yes

History
- Opened: March 4, 2000

Services
Preceding station	Muni	Following station
Market and Main / Market and Drumm toward 17th Street and Castro	F Market & Wharves	Ferry Building toward Jones and Beach
Location

Don Chee Way and Steuart station is a light rail station in San Francisco, California, United States, serving the San Francisco Municipal Railway's F Market & Wharves heritage railway line. It is located on Don Chee Way, a streetcar right-of-way, between Steuart Street and The Embarcadero and serves as the station for the San Francisco Railway Museum.

The station opened on March 4, 2000 with the streetcar's extension to Fisherman's Wharf.

Don Chee Way was named after Donald Chee, a San Francisco Municipal Railway project manager who was responsible for getting the F Market & Wharves line built. Chee died of cancer on August 26, 2002.
