= Robert Dollar Co. No. 3 =

Robert Dollar Company 3
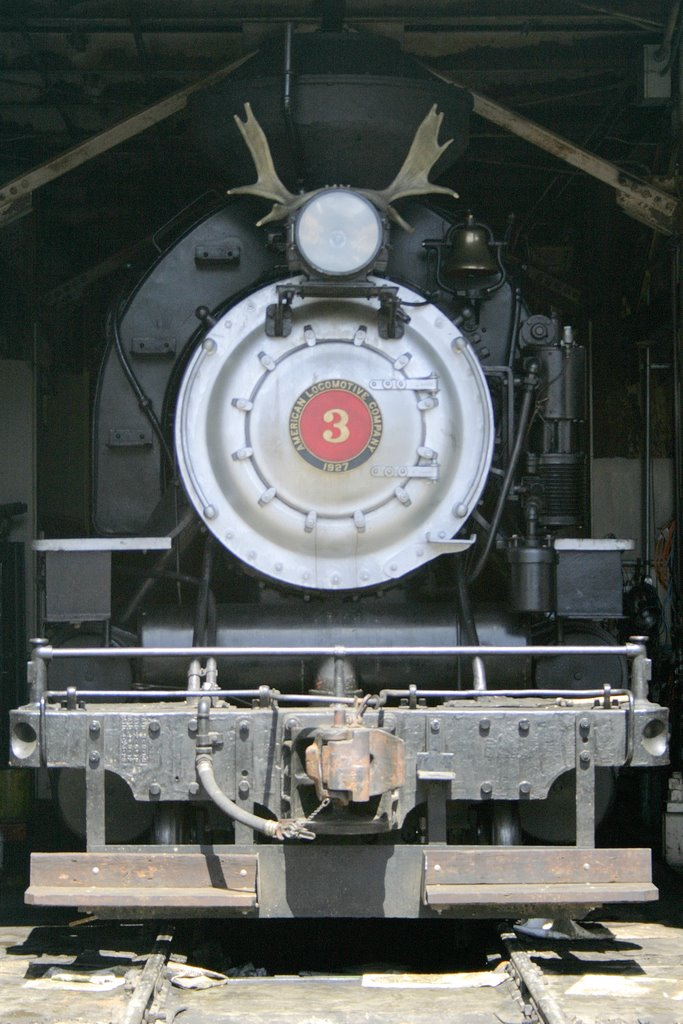
- Robert Dollar No. 3
Type and origin
- Power type: Steam
- Builder: American Locomotive Company
- Serial number: 67544
- Build date: November 1927
Specifications
- Configuration
  - Whyte: 2-6-2ST
  - UIC: 1′C1′ t
- Gauge: 4 ft 8 1/2 in (1,435 mm)
- Driver dia.: 44 inches (1,118 mm)
- Loco weight: 133,000 lb (60.3 tonnes)
- Fuel type: New: Wood; Now: Oil
- Boiler pressure: 200 psi (1,400 kPa)
- Cylinders: Two, outside
- Cylinder size: 15 in × 24 in (381 mm × 610 mm)
- Loco brake: Straight air
- Train brakes: 6ET
Performance figures
- Tractive effort: 20,900 lbf (93.0 kN)
Career
- Operators: Walter A. Woodard Lumber Company; Lorane Valley Lumber Company; Robert Dollar Lumber Company; Niles Canyon Railway
- Numbers: WAWLC 3 LVLC 3 RDLC 3 NICX 3
- Locale: Cottage Grove, Oregon
- Retired: 1959
- Restored: 2007
- Current owner: Pacific Locomotive Association
- Disposition: Operational

Robert Dollar Company 3 is a 2-6-2 "Prairie" type steam locomotive on the Niles Canyon Railway in California. It is notable for having been the last wood-burning locomotive built for an American company.

== History ==
The No. 3 was built new by the American Locomotive Company for the Walter A. Woodard Lumber Company in November 1927. The Woodard Company assigned the 3 to its sawmill in Cottage Grove, Oregon.

In 1942, the sawmill, and the locomotive along with it, was sold to J. H. Chambers & Son. They kept it for just four years before selling to facility and locomotive to the Lorane Valley Lumber Company in 1946. In 1951, the locomotive was sold again, to the Robert Dollar Lumber Company. The Robert Dollar company converted the locomotive to burn oil, and finally donated it to the San Francisco Maritime Museum Association in 1959.

The San Francisco Maritime National Historical Park ended up not having much use for a locomotive, and she was leased in 1973 to the Bay Area Electric Railroad Association (it was eventually donated). The Western Railway Museum began restoration of the engine in 1979, but this project was not finished, and the disassembled No. 3 was donated to the Pacific Locomotive Association (Niles Canyon Railway) in 1999.

Restoration on Robert Dollar Company No. 3 took eight years and was completed in February 2007, and it has been operating in regular excursion service ever since. It also took part in several special events, including a photo session in 2009, where it sat side by side with Southern Pacific 2472 and Union Pacific 844, and Steamfest III, where it performed a quintupleheader with Quincy Railroad No. 2, Santa Cruz Portland Cement No. 2, Clover Valley Lumber Company No. 4, and Mason County Logging Co. 7.

External image
- https://www.flickr.com/photos/kirkhoward/3379012435/in/pool-postcard
