= Sonoma TrainTown Railroad =

Tourist railroad and amusement park

- Interactive map of Sonoma TrainTown Railroad
- Location: Sonoma, California
- Coordinates: 38.2775°N 122.4596°W
- Opened: 1968
- Theme: Tourist railroad
- Area: 10 acres (4.0 ha)
- Website: www.traintown.com

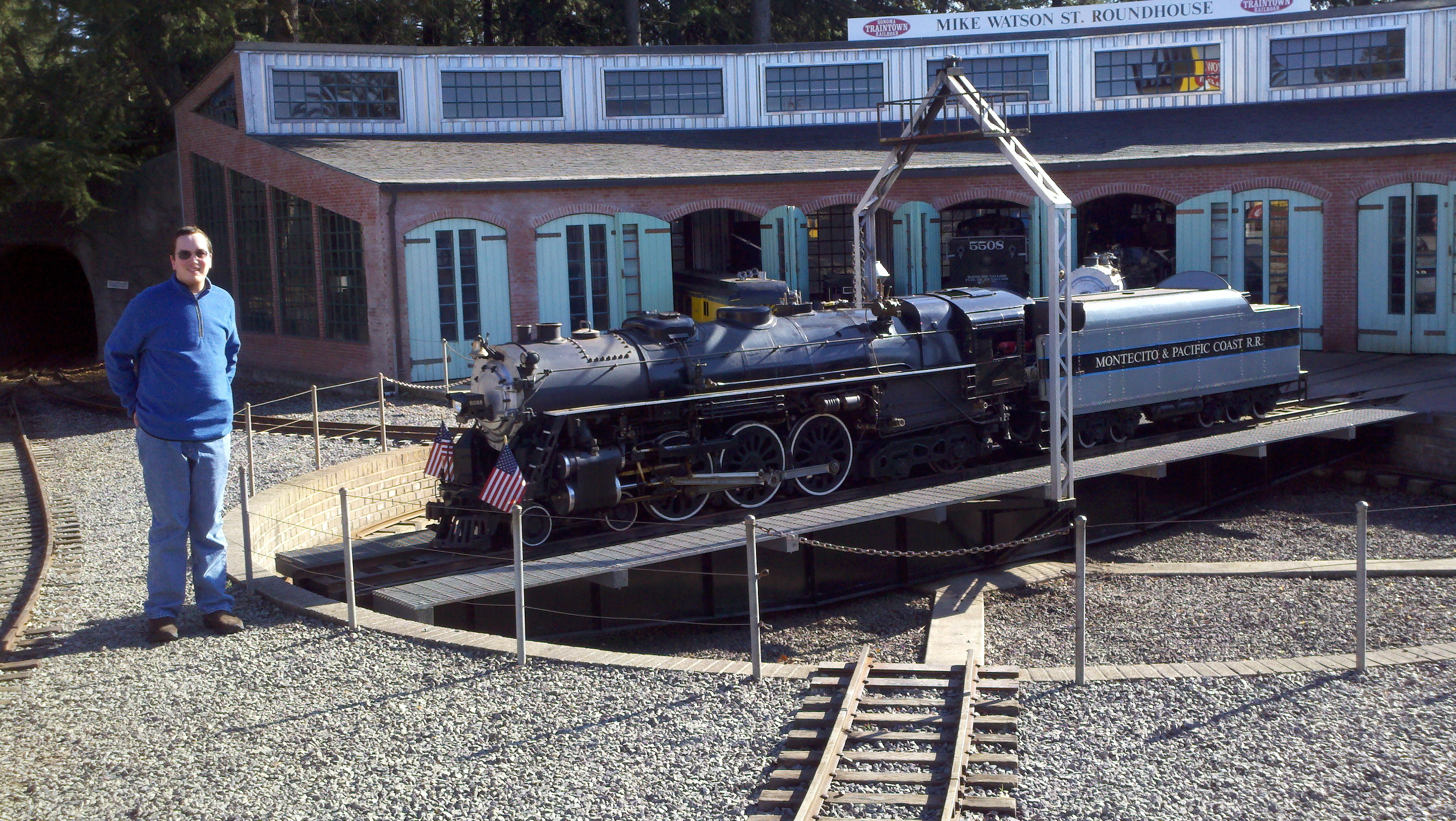
TrainTown steam locomotive on the turntable in front of the roundhouse

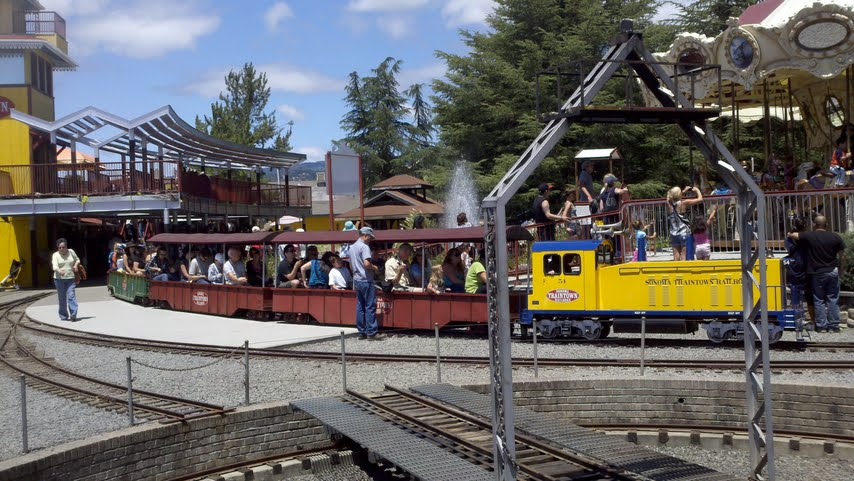
Sonoma TrainTown Railroad

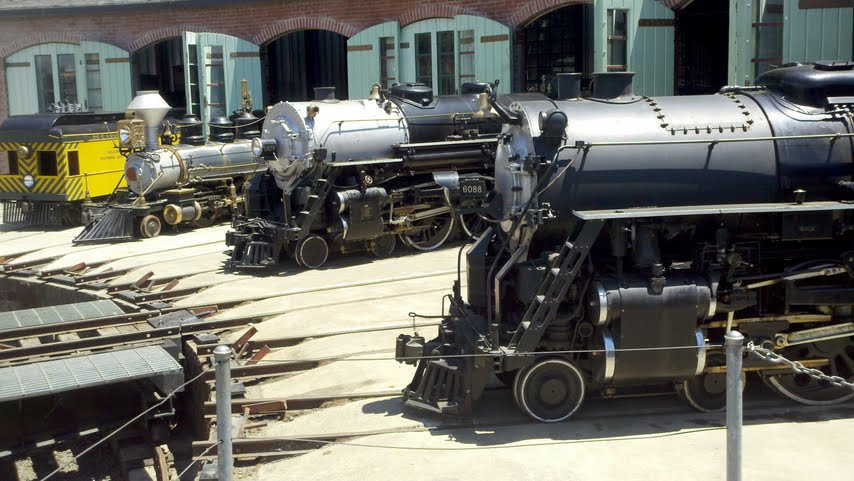
Quarter-scale steam locomotives at the TrainTown roundhouse

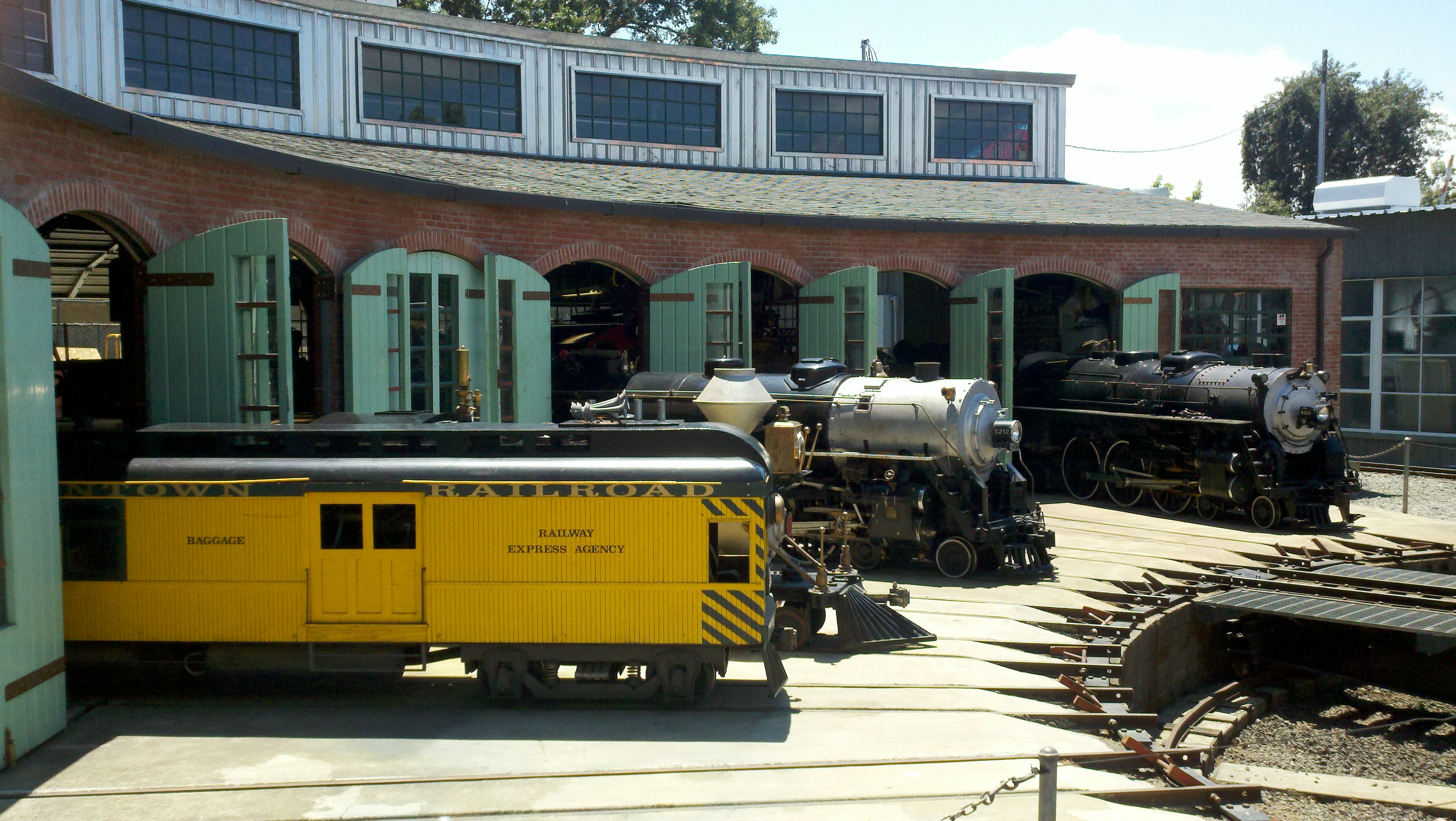
The TrainTown roundhouse

The Sonoma TrainTown Railroad (commonly called "Sonoma Train Town") is a tourist railroad and 10 acre amusement park in Sonoma, California. Its main feature is a 15 in (381 mm) gauge miniature railway, which closely corresponds to a 1:4 scale model of a 4 ft 8 1/2 in (1,435 mm) standard gauge railroad.

== History ==
TrainTown was founded by Stanley L. Frank of Oakland, California. In 1958 he "began bringing his dream railroad to life, building everything himself, from the houses and landscaping to the line's two steam locomotives and one electric engine." The railroad opened to the public in 1968. Frank died in 1977, and his son Robert Frank has continued to run the day-to-day operations of TrainTown alongside his wife Barbara and his daughter Monica. TrainTown also features a beautiful carousel, a mine train roller coaster, and an airplane ride. The petting zoo includes many animals, some of whom are rescues, such as goats, chickens, ducks, llamas, sheep, and bunnies.

== Descriptions ==
Called "an endearing and surprising modern tribute to trains", TrainTown is "an obsessively accurate model railroad". It has been described as "the most well-developed miniature railroad" in the Americas. It operates in "a wooded 10-acre park on a 20-minute ride past waterfalls and beautifully detailed houses, over a trestle and through several tunnels, all precisely one-quarter the size of the real thing." It carries up to 90 passengers on each ride, and includes four miles of track. A travel writer said that "the whole layout is so cleverly crafted that it's a marvel of dedication to the art of the train buff".

TrainTown features an operating replica of a New York Central Hudson locomotive, but numbered 5212, which no New York Central steam locomotive was ever numbered. This is considered by some to be the "most beautiful steam locomotive of the 1930s".

In 2009, steam locomotive 4-6-4 Hudson, number 6088, arrived at Sonoma TrainTown. It was built in the 1980s and originally ran on the 15 in (381 mm) gauge Goleta Valley Railroad.

== Other attractions ==
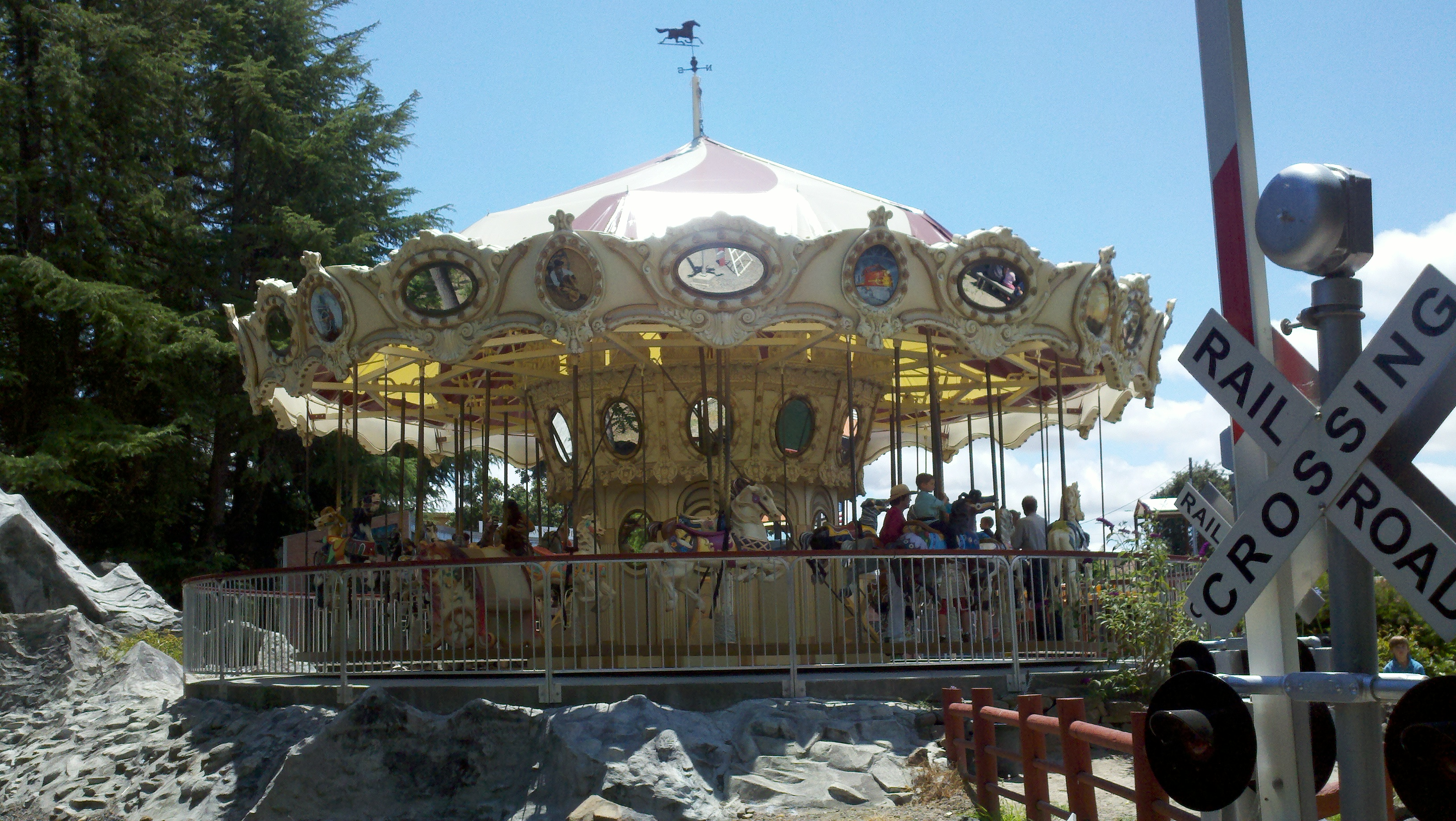
The carousel at TrainTown

The park features a petting zoo and six vintage amusement rides:

- Iron Horse Carousel
- Sonoma TrainTown Airlines
- Locomotion Scrambler
- High Iron Ferris Wheel - a 46-foot Ferris wheel
- Mine Train roller coaster - A new roller coaster that went into service in July, 2015.
