= Niles Depot Museum =

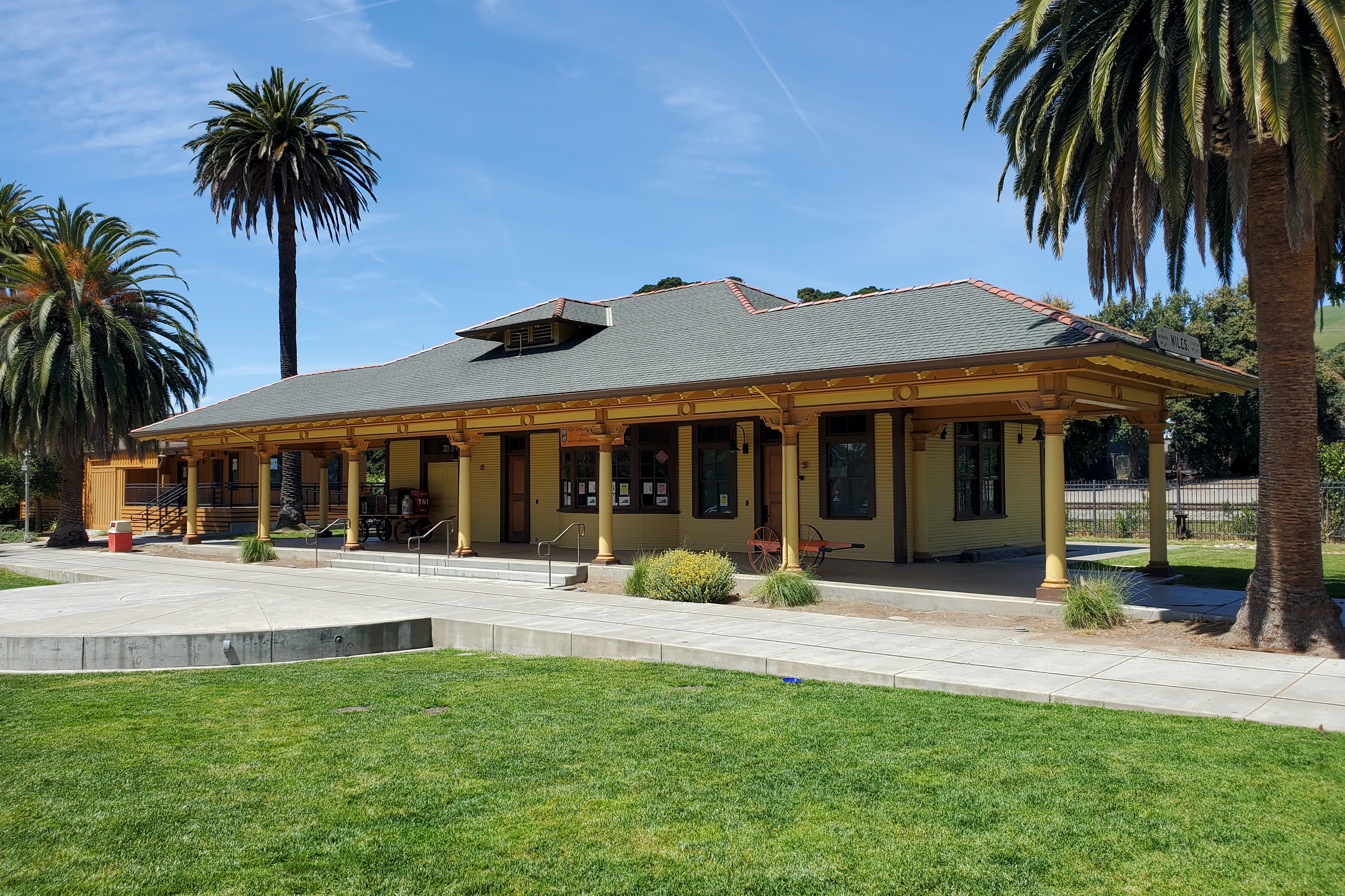
- Niles Depot Museum in April 2024
- Established: May 16, 1982
- Location: 37592 B Niles Boulevard; Niles, California 94536
- Coordinates: 37°34′39″N 121°58′42″W
- Type: Railway museum
- Parking: On site (no charge)
- Website: www.nilesdepotmuseum.org

The Niles Depot Museum is located in the former Southern Pacific Railroad colonnade-style passenger depot built in 1901, and freight depot, located in the Niles District of Fremont, California, United States. The museum is operated by the Niles Depot Historical Foundation and features exhibits and artifacts about area railroads, including the early Southern Pacific Railroad and Western Pacific Railroad, as well as the current Union Pacific Railroad and Amtrak.

The museum is also constructing two model railways of Niles and surrounding areas, which are operated by the Tri-City Society of Model Engineers.

== Southern Pacific station ==
Southern Pacific established rail service to Niles in 1870. The original station building was replaced with a larger depot in 1901. The second station was moved to become a private residence and replaced with the final passenger depot. Passenger service ended in 1941, though the building continued to be used as for freight.

The 1901-built station was restored in 1988 and moved again to Niles Plaza in 2009.

Preceding station	Heritage railroads	Following station
Sunol towards Alford	Niles Canyon Railway	Terminus
Former services
Preceding station	Southern Pacific Railroad	Following station
Pabrico toward Oakland Pier	Oakland – San Jose	Fremont toward San Jose
