= Los Altos History Museum =

Coordinates: 37.381039°N 122.111956°W

The Los Altos History Museum is a museum in Los Altos, California. Opened in 2001, the museum showcases the history of Los Altos and surrounding areas, including the transformation of the agricultural paradise once known as the "Valley of Heart's Delight" into the high-tech Silicon Valley. The Los Altos History Museum is situated in one of the few remaining apricot orchards in the San Francisco Bay area. Admission is free.

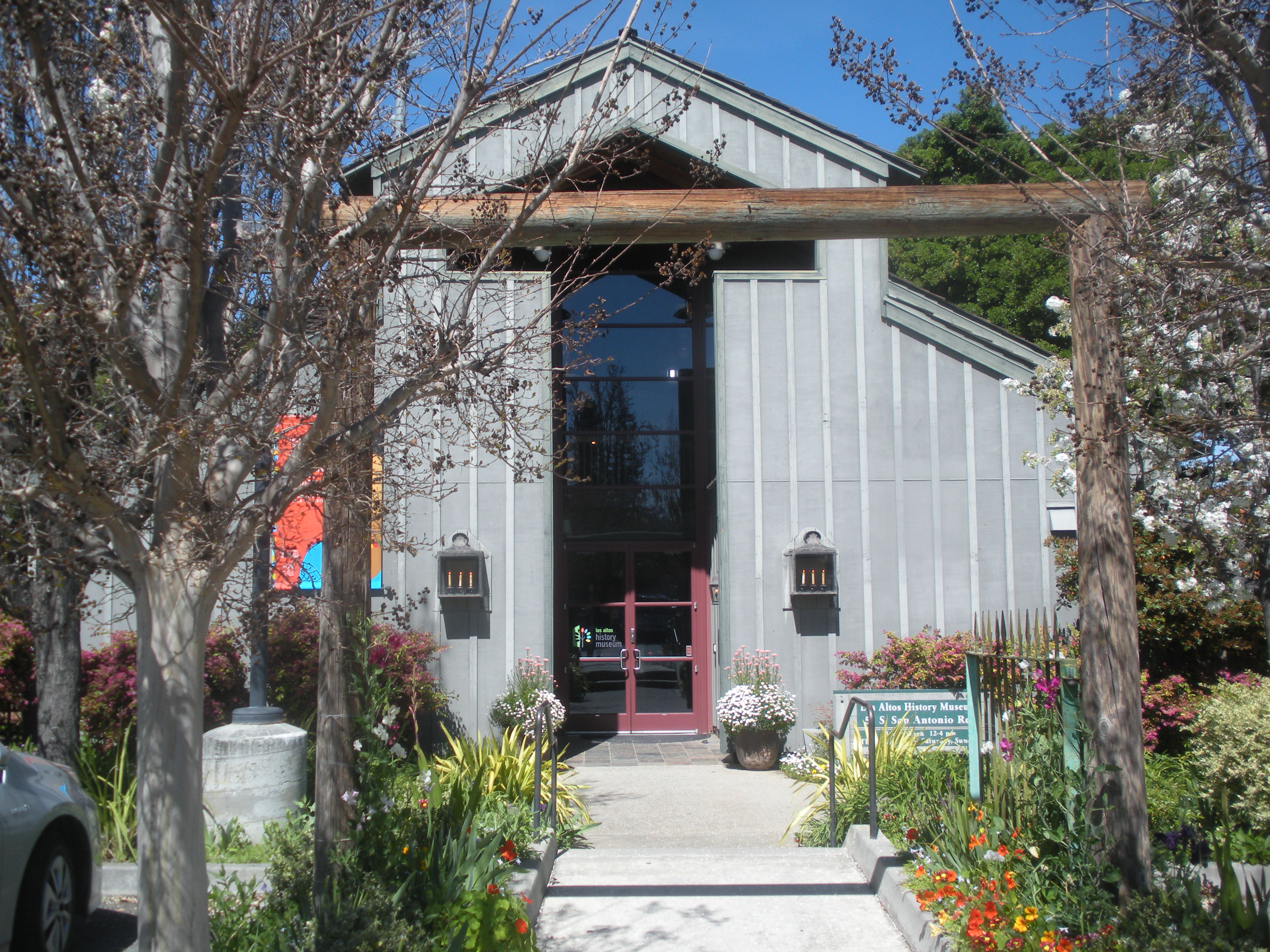
Entrance to the Los Altos History Museum

The museum features both a permanent exhibit as well as changing exhibits. Its permanent/flagship exhibit, titled "Making Connections: Stories from the Land," delivers an immersive, interactive multimedia experience of the events that transformed the landscape and the people who shaped this area, from the Ohlone people, to Spanish and Mexican land grantees, early settlers, apricot orchardists, and today's Silicon Valley residents. One highlight is a diorama of Los Altos as it appeared in 1932 with an operational O-scale model train representing the Southern Pacific rail line through the town that ran from 1907 through 1963 and ceased operating in 1964 to be replaced by Foothill Expressway.

The museum's Changing Exhibits Gallery features two to four original exhibits a year on diverse topics. Social issues and land use are covered in detail, as are the lives of local residents.

Across the courtyard, the J. Gilbert Smith house, built in 1905, was designated a local Historical Landmark and a California State Point of Historical Interest in 1987. The Craftsman-style home is fully furnished, depicting life during the Depression.

An outdoors agricultural exhibit features an historic tank house showing traditional water management techniques, apricot cutting and sulfuring sheds, and a display of farm equipment, including a tractor to climb on. Adjacent to the museum grounds stands one of the last remaining apricot orchards in the community. The museum became stewards of the Los Altos Heritage Orchard in 2023, overseeing the preservation of this historical treasure.

The education committee presents third- and fourth-grade history curriculum tours. Researchers are welcome to schedule an appointment to examine the museum's collection of over 20,000 documents, photographs, and objects relating to the history of the area.

Both the museum and the oak-studded gardens are available for event rentals, including weddings, luncheons, reunions, memorials, or other private gatherings.
