= KraussMaffei =

German manufacturer

- Type: Subsidiary
- Industry: Chemical
- Founded: 1838
- Founder: Joseph Anton von Maffei
- Headquarters: Parsdorf, Germany
- Products: Machinery and systems for producing and processing plastics and rubber
- Number of employees: 4,000
- Parent: Sinochem
- Website: kraussmaffei.com

KraussMaffei is a German manufacturing company. It is a manufacturer of injection molding machines, automation, machines for plastics extrusion technology, and reaction process machinery.

== History ==
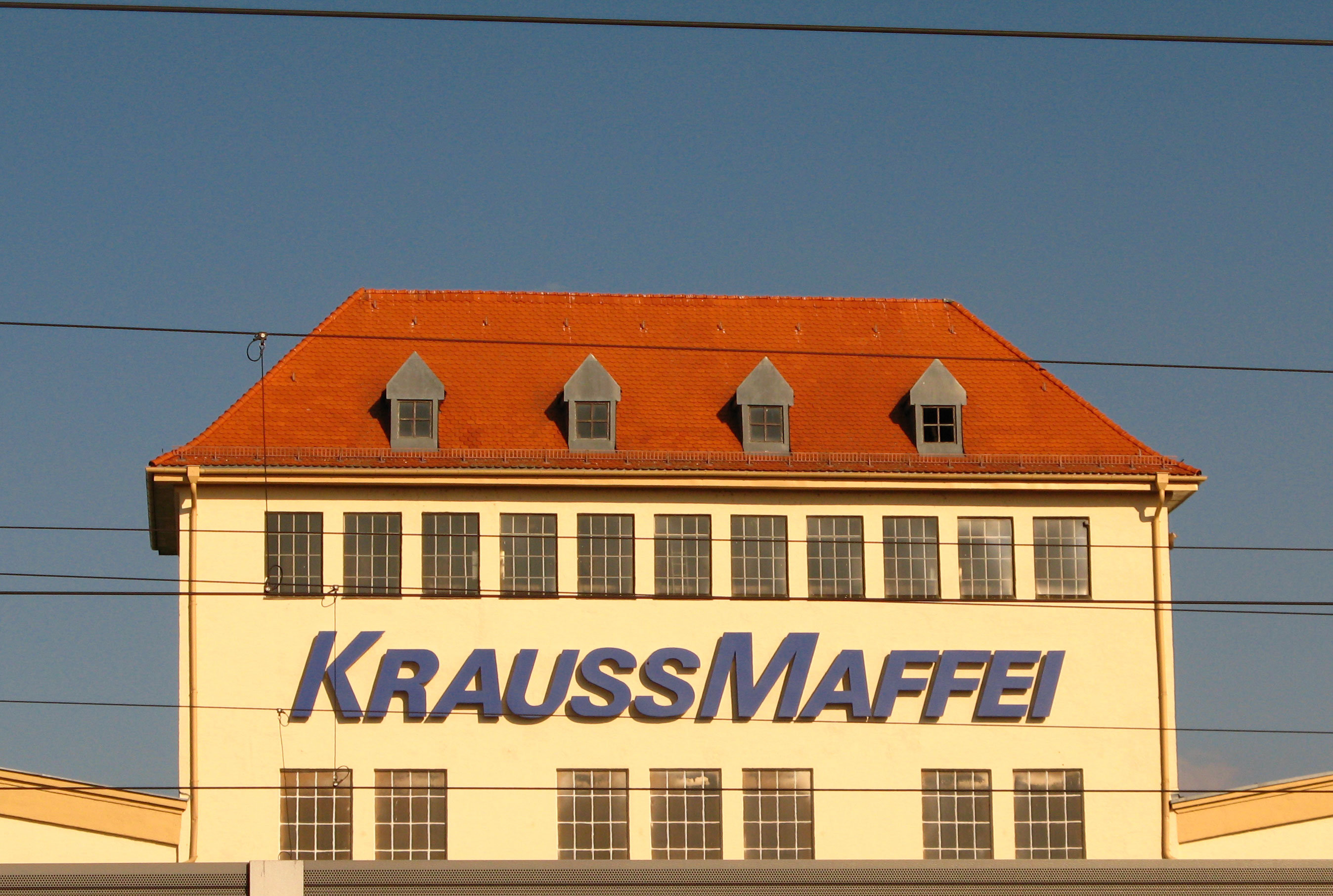
Historical KraussMaffei company building with inscription

KraussMaffei was formed from a merger of the two Munich firms of Maffei (founded 1838) and Krauss & Co. (founded 1860). Both belonged to the leading German makers of locomotives of various types. Maffei also built other steam-operated vehicles and later manufactured vehicles with combustion engines, including locomotives, trolleybuses, and buses through the 1950s. The headquarters of the firm remained in Munich.

During World War II KrausMaffei used thousands of prisoners of war and concentration camp internees as forced labor at its Munich-Allach plant to produce military equipment. Major products made there included the Sd.Kfz. 7, Panzer I Ausf. C and Panzer I Ausf. F.

KrausMaffei had produced injection moulding equipment since 1957. In 1964 the company Eckert & Ziegler GmbH was taken over. In the 1960s, KraussMaffei built several examples of the ML 4000 C′C′ diesel-hydraulic locomotive for demonstration and testing on American railroads. Denver and Rio Grande Western Railroad and Southern Pacific participated in the tests, but both found that the locomotives were unsuitable for service in the rugged Rocky Mountains which both companies required.

KrausMaffei was a major tank manufacturer. In 1963, the company started production of the Leopard tank. Development and production of Leopard 2 tank began in 1972 in cooperation with Wegmann & Co. The "tank family" comprised not only main battle tanks, but also combat engineering vehicles, air defense tank Flakpanzer Gepard, self-propelled howitzer Panzerhaubitze 2000 (PzH 2000), as well as reconnaissance and transportation vehicles. More than 10,000 armored vehicles based on Leopard tanks were produced since the 1960s.

In the 1970s, KraussMaffei were involved in the development of the Transrapid magnetic levitation train. In 1986 the plastics equipment division was separated and became Krauss-Maffei Kunststofftechnik GmbH. Mannesmann acquired majority share of KraussMaffei in 1989, and bought out the remaining shares in 1996. In 1999 KraussMaffei merged with Demag to form the Mannesmann Demag Kraus-Maffei. In 1999 the defence component was spun off and merged with Wegmann & Co to become Krauss-Maffei Wegmann (KMW). Co-operation between companies was already well established, with Wegmann supplying tank turrets, among other things. After the acquisition of Mannesmann's telecommunication business by Vodafone in February 2000, Mannesmann group was dissolved.

KraussMaffei's locomotive production and defense division Krauss-Maffei Wegmann were bought Siemens Mobility. In 1999, Siemens Mobility increased its stake in KraussMaffei from 25% to 75%. In 2000 Krauss-Maffei Kunststofftechnik GmbH took over the KrausMaffei trademarks following dissolution of Mannesmann Group. In 2016, KraussMaffei (by then only a plastics manufacturer) was purchased by ChemChina. In November 2018 KraussMaffei was the victim of a ransomware attack, leading to severe drawdown in the production. After the transaction, ChemChina held a good 60 percent of the shares, another Chinese sovereign wealth fund around 15 percent, and the rest was free float. At the same time, production in China was stepped up: In addition, the ChemChina majority holding Qingdao Tianhua Institute of Chemistry Engineering (THY) took over a ChemChina plant in Sanming, which builds injection molding machines for the Chinese market.

Starting in 2022, the company was to move its headquarters and location in Allach in phases to an industrial estate then under construction in the community of Vaterstetten, which is located north of the village of Parsdorf. KraussMaffei planned to cut 510 jobs worldwide by 2023, most of them in Germany, as the company reported in early 2020.
