= Pier 41 =

Ferry terminal in San Francisco, California

Coordinates: 37°48′33″N 122°24′41″W

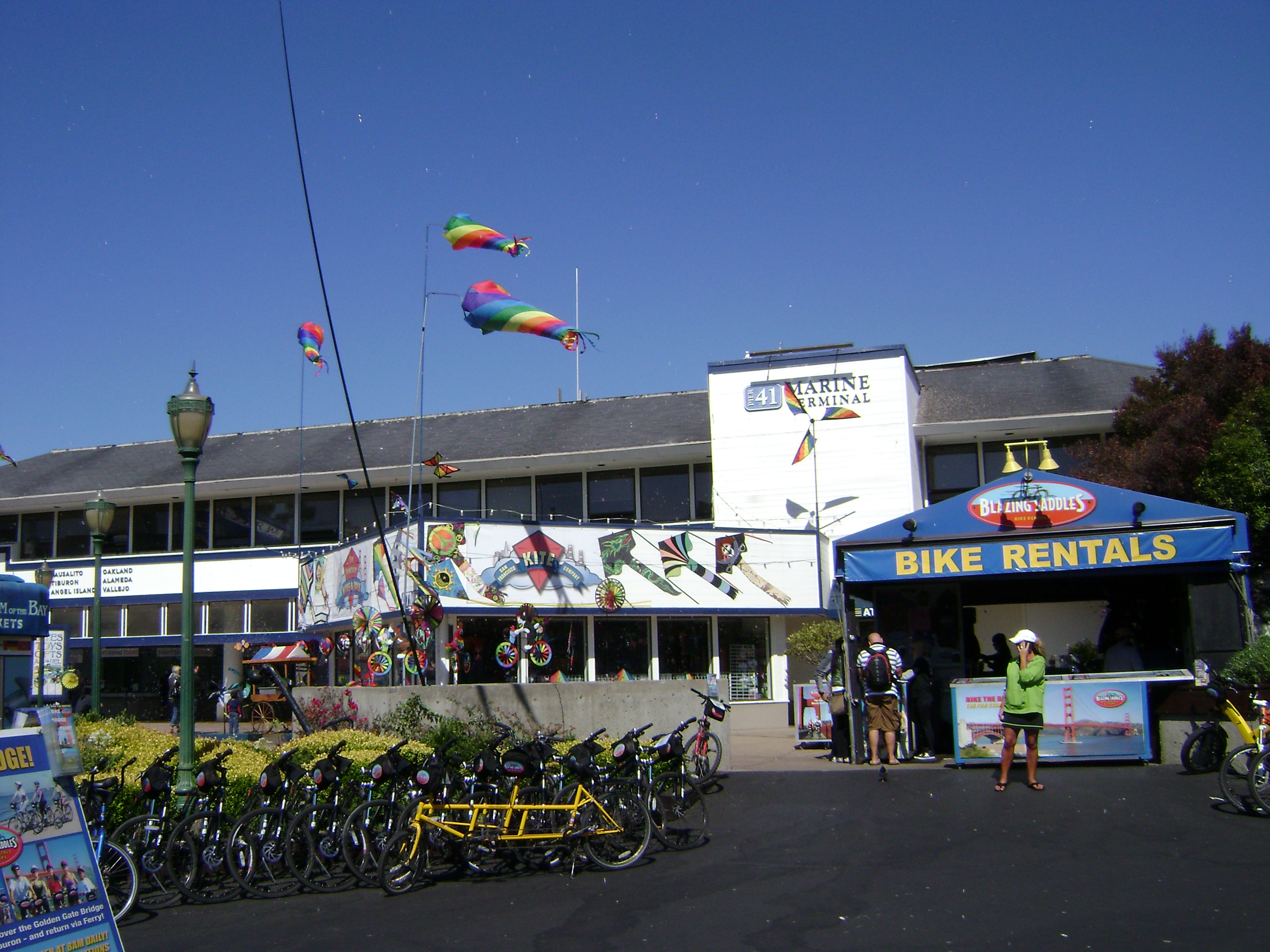
- Pier 41

General information
- Location: San Francisco, California
- System: Ferry terminal
- Owner: Port of San Francisco
- Connections: San Francisco Bay Ferry; Golden Gate Ferry; San Francisco Municipal Railway

Construction
- Parking: Yes (via Pier 39)
- Cycle facilities: Yes

Services
Preceding station	Muni	Following station
Jefferson and Taylor toward Jones and Beach	E Embarcadero Suspended transfer at Jefferson and Powell	Stockton and The Embarcadero One-way operation
Jefferson and Taylor toward Jones and Beach	F Market & Wharves transfer at Jefferson and Powell	Stockton and The Embarcadero One-way operation
Location

Pier 41 is a ferry terminal on Fisherman's Wharf in San Francisco. The former headquarters of Blue & Gold Fleet, their box offices are now located at Pier 39.

The Pier is located east of the Fisherman's Wharf district and to the west of Pier 39. The ferry terminal is close to North Beach, Chinatown, and the Embarcadero. The area is easily accessible via the historic F Market streetcars.

From Pier 41 one can see Angel Island, Alcatraz, Golden Gate Bridge and Pier 39.

Service has been temporarily suspended as of May 2026 to the Oakland Ferry Terminal, Vallejo Station, the Sausalito Ferry Terminal, and the Ayala Cove Ferry Terminal on Angel Island.
