= Beach Station =

Beach Station may refer to:

- Beach Station (Chesterfield, Virginia), a United States national historic district
- Beach Monorail Station, also called Central Beach Monorail Station, in Singapore
- The Beach (radio station), an FM radio station in East Norfolk and North East Suffolk, England
- Beach railway station (England), a former miniature railway station in North Yorkshire, England
- Beach railway station (New Zealand), a former station in Wellington, New Zealand
- Beach Halt railway station, in Wales
- Beach Halt railway station (Ireland), a former station in County Donegal, Ireland

== Similar titles ==
Other stations with the word beach in their names include:

=== Transportation ===
==== Asia ====
- Carmel Beach central bus station, the main bus station in Haifa, Israel
- Chennai Beach railway station, in Chennai, India
- Dadaepo Beach station, a metro station in Busan, South Korea
- Golden Pebble Beach station, a metro station in Dalian, China
- Hirokawa Beach Station in Hirogawa, Arida District, Wakayama Prefecture, Japan

==== Europe ====
===== United Kingdom =====
- Beach Road railway station, a former station in Devon, Cornwall, England
- Ainsdale Beach railway station, a former station in Merseyside, England
- Ardrossan South Beach railway station, in North Ayrshire, Scotland
- Bishopstone Beach Halt railway station, a former station in East Sussex, England
- Blackpool Pleasure Beach railway station, in Blackpool, England
- Cooden Beach railway station, in East Sussex, England
- Cromer Beach railway station, in Norfolk, England
- Felixstowe Beach railway station, a former station in Suffolk, England
- Severn Beach railway station, in South Gloucestershire, England
- Yarmouth Beach railway station, a former station in Norfolk, England

==== North America ====
- Qualicum Beach station, a former station in British Columbia, Canada

===== United States =====
- Beach 25th Street station, a rapid transit station in Queens, New York
- Beach 36th Street station, a rapid transit station in Queens, New York
- Beach 44th Street station, a rapid transit station in Queens, New York
- Beach 60th Street station, a rapid transit station in Queens, New York
- Beach 67th Street station, a rapid transit station in Queens, New York
- Beach 90th Street station, a rapid transit station in Queens, New York
- Beach 98th Street station, a rapid transit station in Queens, New York
- Beach 105th Street station, a rapid transit station in Queens, New York
- Beach Channel station, a former commuter rail station in Queens, New York
- Beach and Mason station, a streetcar stop in San Francisco, California
- Beach and Stockton station, a streetcar stop in San Francisco, California
- Boynton Beach station, a commuter rail station in Florida
- Boynton Beach Boulevard station, a proposed commuter rail station in Florida
- Bradley Beach station, in New Jersey
- Brighton Beach station (BMT Brighton Line), a rapid transit station in Brooklyn, New York
- Chesapeake Beach railway station, a former station in Maryland
- Deerfield Beach station, in Florida
- Delray Beach station, in Florida
- Delray Beach Seaboard Air Line Railway Station, a former depot in Florida
- Downtown Long Beach station, in California
- Grover Beach station, in California
- Hamilton Beach station, a commuter rail station in Queens, New York
- Howard Beach–JFK Airport station, a subway and people mover station in Queens, New York
- Jones and Beach station a streetcar stop in San Francisco, California
- Lake Worth Beach station, in Florida
- Long Beach station (LIRR), a commuter rail station in New York
- Monument Beach station, a former station in Massachusetts
- Myrtle Beach Atlantic Coast Line Railroad Station, a former station in South Carolina
- Old Orchard Beach station, in Maine
- Point Pleasant Beach station, in New Jersey
- Pompano Beach station, a commuter rail station in Florida
- Rainier Beach station, a light rail station located in Seattle, Washington
- Redondo Beach station, a light rail station in Los Angeles County, California
- Revere Beach station, a rapid transit station in Revere, Massachusetts
- Rockaway Park–Beach 116th Street station, a rapid transit station in Queens, New York
- Round Lake Beach station, a commuter rail station in Illinois
- Solana Beach station, in California
- South Beach station, a former rapid transit station in Staten Island, New York
- West Palm Beach station, in Florida
- West Palm Beach station (Brightline), in Florida

==== Oceania ====
===== Australia =====
- Brighton Beach railway station, in Victoria
- Hallett Cove Beach railway station, in Adelaide, South Australia
- Henley Beach railway station, a former station in Adelaide, South Australia
- Main Beach light rail station, in Queensland
- Scarborough Beach bus station, in Scarborough, Western Australia
- South Beach railway station, a former station in Perth, Western Australia
- Williamstown Beach railway station, in Victoria

=== Other uses ===
==== Asia ====
- Cheyne Beach Whaling Station, a defunct whaling station in Australia

==== North America ====
Canada

- Brighton Beach Generating Station, in Windsor, Ontario
- RCAF Station Jericho Beach, originally known as Jericho Beach Air Station, in Vancouver, British Columbia

United States

- Assateague Beach Coast Guard Station, a former United States Coast Guard facility in Virginia
- East Beach Station, a United States Coast Guard station in Georgia
- Gold Beach Ranger Station, in Rogue River-Siskiyou National Forest, Oregon
- Klipsan Beach Life Saving Station, a former United States Life-Saving Service station in Washington
- Manhattan Beach Air Force Station, a former United States Air Force facility in Brooklyn, New York
- Naval Air Station Daytona Beach, the World War II designation of Daytona Beach International Airport, Florida
- Naval Weapons Station Seal Beach, a United States Navy facility in California
- Squan Beach Life-Saving Station, in New Jersey
- Willow Beach Gauging Station, in Nevada

=== See also ===
- Beech Forest railway station, a former station on the Crowes railway line, in Australia
- Beachmont station, a rapid transit station in Boston, Massachusetts, USA
- Carshalton Beeches railway station, on the Sutton & Mole Valley Lines, in England
