= Market and Noe station =

Market and Noe
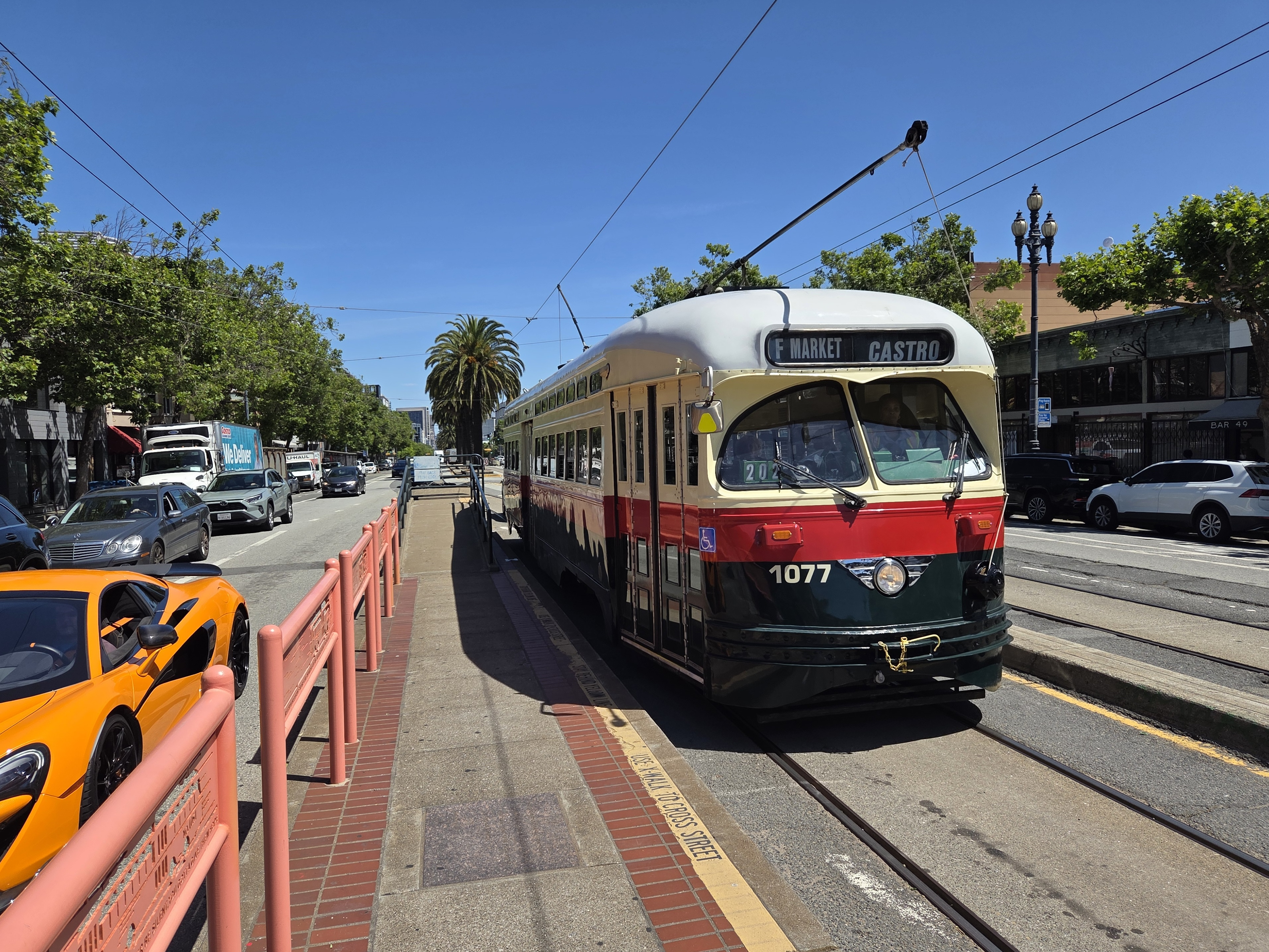
- A westbound streetcar at Market and Noe in 2026

General information
- Location: Market Street at Noe Street; San Francisco, California
- Coordinates: 37°45′51″N 122°25′59″W
- Platforms: 2 side platforms (boarding islands)
- Tracks: 2
- Connections: Muni: 37

Construction
- Accessible: Yes

History
- Rebuilt: September 1, 1995

Services
Preceding station	Muni	Following station
17th Street and Castro Terminus	F Market & Wharves	Market and Sanchez toward Jones and Beach
Location

Market and Noe station is a light rail stop in San Francisco, California, United States, serving the San Francisco Municipal Railway F Market & Wharves heritage railway line. It is located on Market Street at the intersections of 16th Street and Noe Street.

In 2022, new decorative railings were added on both boarding islands as part of the Upper Market Street Safety Project. They feature a quote from Harvey Milk's 1977 "You've Got to Have Hope" speech, as well as an illustration of streetcar #1051, which is dedicated in Milk's honor.
