= Market and Guerrero / Market and Laguna stations =

Pair of one-way light rail stations in California, United States

Market and Guerrero Market and Laguna
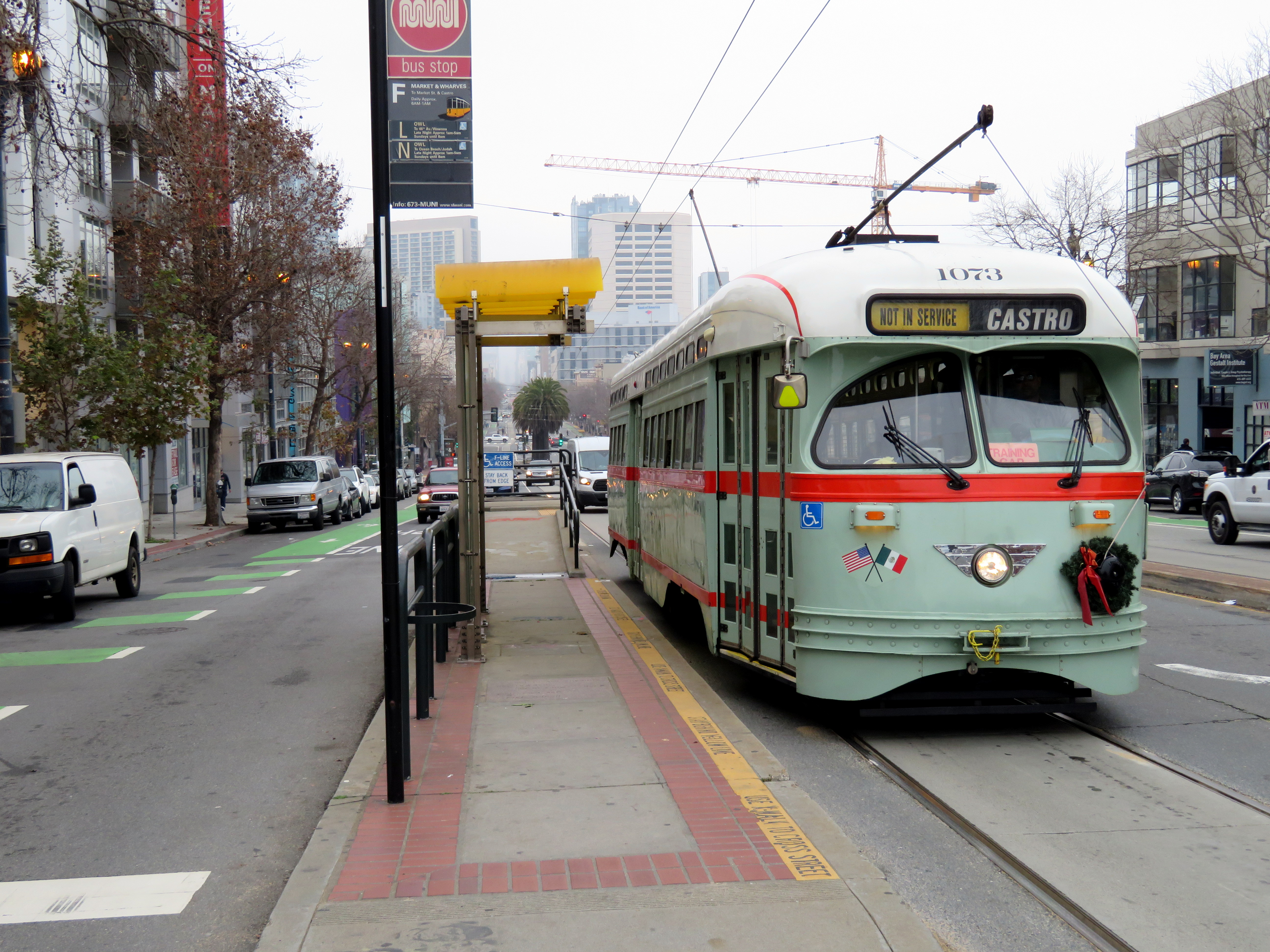
- Streetcar at Market and Laguna in January 2018

General information
- Location: Market Street at Guerrero and Laguna Streets; San Francisco, California
- Coordinates: 37°46′15″N 122°25′29″W
- Platforms: 2 side platforms
- Tracks: 2

Construction
- Accessible: Yes

History
- Rebuilt: September 1, 1995, 2021–22

Services
Preceding station	Muni	Following station
Market and Dolores / Market and Buchanan toward 17th Street and Castro	F Market & Wharves	Market and Gough toward Jones and Beach
Location

Market and Guerrero (eastbound) and Market and Laguna (westbound) are a pair of one-way light rail stations in San Francisco, California, United States, serving the San Francisco Municipal Railway F Market & Wharves heritage railway line. They are located on Market Street at the intersections of Laguna Street and Guerrero Street.

In 2021–22, the SFMTA extended the outbound boarding island as part of the Upper Market Street Safety Project. New decorative railings, which feature a quote from Harvey Milk's 1977 "You've Got to Have Hope" speech as well as an illustration of streetcar #1051 (which is dedicated in Milk's honor) were added to both islands.
