= Jefferson and Powell station =

Light rail station in California, United States

Powell & Jefferson
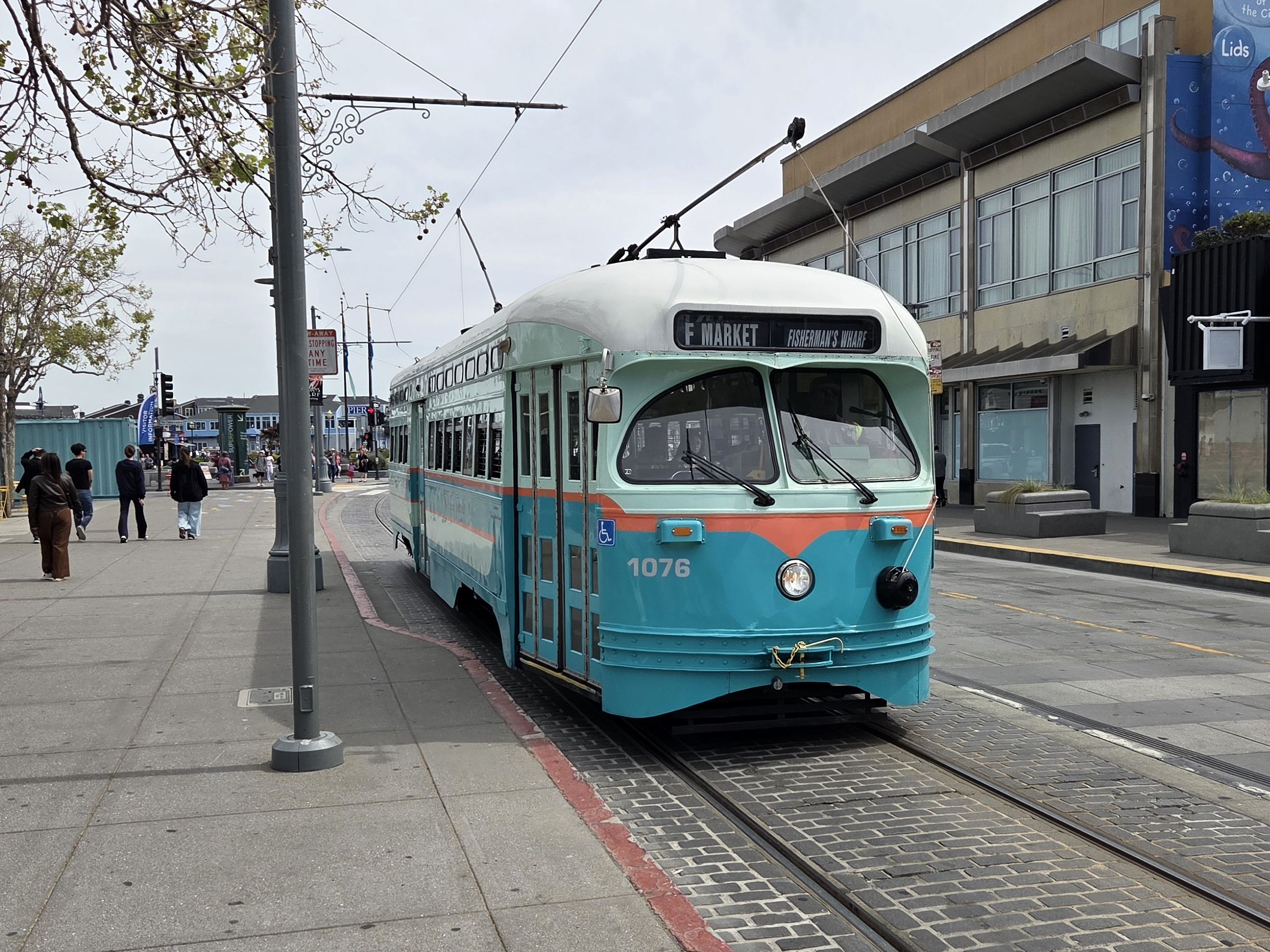
- A streetcar at Jefferson and Powell in 2026

General information
- Location: Jefferson Street at Powell Street; San Francisco, California
- Coordinates: 37°48′31″N 122°24′48″W
- Platforms: 1 side platform
- Tracks: 1
- Connections: Muni: 39 (at Pier 41): Golden Gate Ferry, San Francisco Bay Ferry

Construction
- Accessible: Yes

History
- Opened: March 4, 2000

Services
Preceding station	Muni	Following station
Jefferson and Taylor toward Jones and Beach	F Market & Wharves	The Embarcadero and Stockton One-way operation
Former services
Preceding station	Muni	Following station
Jefferson and Taylor toward Jones and Beach	E Embarcadero	The Embarcadero and Stockton One-way operation
Location

Jefferson and Powell station is a streetcar station in the Fisherman's Wharf district of San Francisco, California, serving the San Francisco Municipal Railway's F Market & Wharves historic streetcar line. It is located on Jefferson Street at Powell Street. The station opened on March 4, 2000, with the streetcar's extension to Fisherman's Wharf.

The stop is located within walking distance of Pier 41, which has ferry service from Golden Gate Ferry, San Francisco Bay Ferry, as well as services targeted at tourists sightseeing and making trips out to Alcatraz Island. The stop is also served by the route 39 bus, plus the L Owl bus route, which provides service along the F Market & Wharves and L Taraval lines during the late night hours when trains do not operate.
