= E Embarcadero =

San Francisco heritage streetcar line

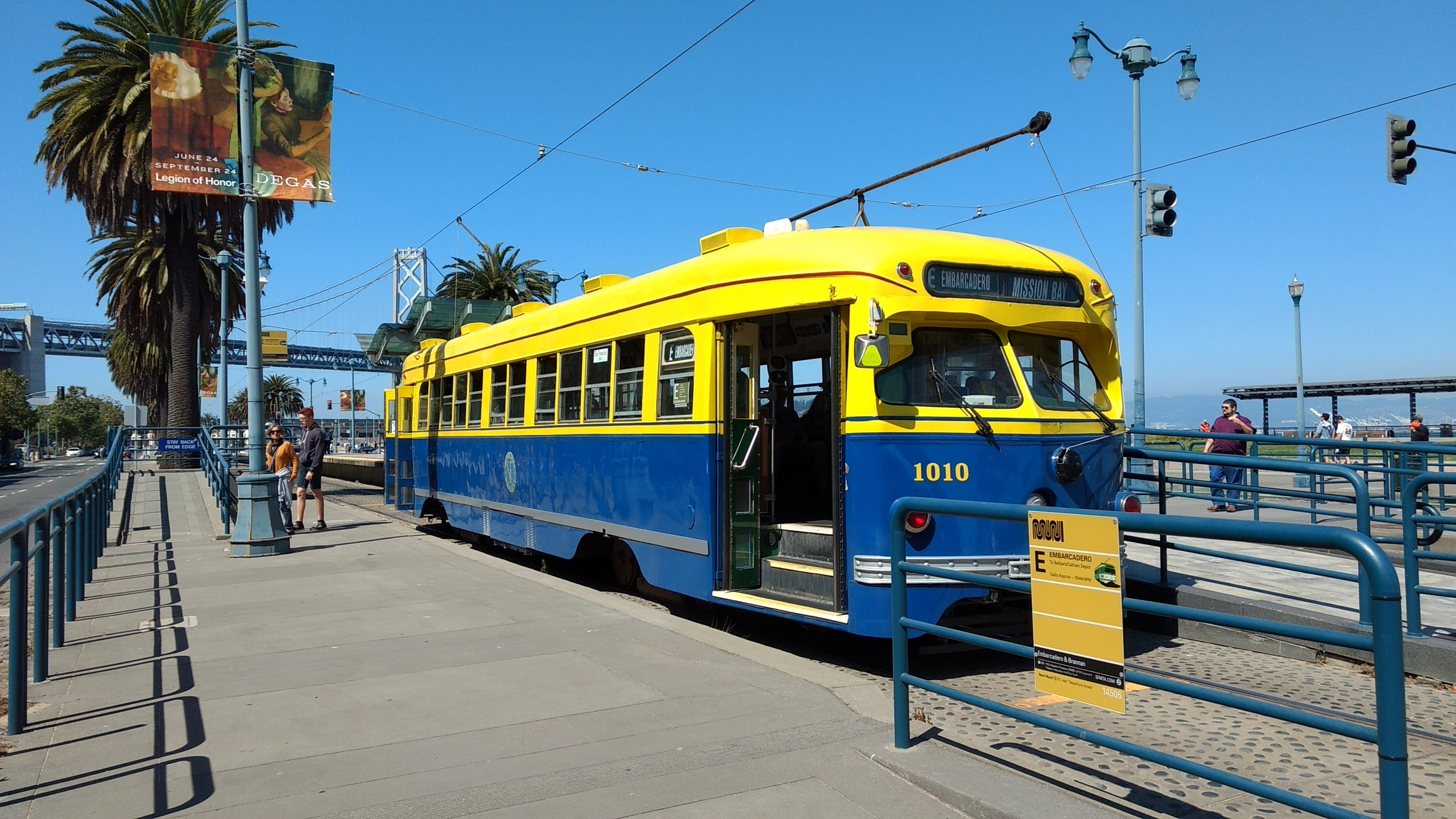
- Streetcar 1010 at Brannan station in 2017

Overview
- Status: No longer operating
- Owner: San Francisco Municipal Transportation Agency (SFMTA)
- Locale: San Francisco, California
- Termini: Jones and Beach; 4th and King
- Stations: 18

Service
- Type: Heritage streetcar
- System: San Francisco Municipal Railway
- Operator: San Francisco Municipal Railway
- Rolling stock: Double-ended historic Muni streetcars

History
- Opened: January 10, 1998 (shuttle service); August 31, 2008 (trial service); August 1, 2015 (weekend service); April 23, 2016 (full service)
- Closed: March 17, 2020

Technical
- Line length: 3.3 miles (5.3 km)
- Character: Mostly in dedicated median; some shared lanes
- Track gauge: 4 ft 8 1/2 in (1,435 mm) standard gauge
- Electrification: Overhead line, 600 V DC

The E Embarcadero is a historic streetcar line that is the San Francisco Municipal Railway's second heritage streetcar line in San Francisco, California. Trial service first ran during the Sunday Streets events on The Embarcadero in 2008. The line initially ran on weekends only, but expanded to weeklong service in late April 2016. In March 2020, service on the line was suspended as part of service reductions during the COVID-19 pandemic.

== Route ==
The initial routing of the line is nearly identical to the defunct 32 Embarcadero bus line, which was discontinued after the F Market & Wharves line began operating along the Embarcadero in 2000. It runs the length of the Embarcadero and San Francisco's segment of the Bay Trail, along pre-existing track used by the F Market & Wharves historic streetcar as well as the N Judah and T Third Street Muni Metro lines and previously unused track bypassing Market Street subway's Embarcadero portal. Service runs from Jones Street and Jefferson Street in Fisherman's Wharf to near the N Judah's platform at Caltrain's King Street and 4th Street Station in the Mission Bay neighborhood – the last trains of the day run to near the adjacent T Third platform at 4th and Berry. Since there is no loop at the Caltrain station, only double-ended streetcars are able to operate on the line until a loop track is built.

=== Proposed extension ===
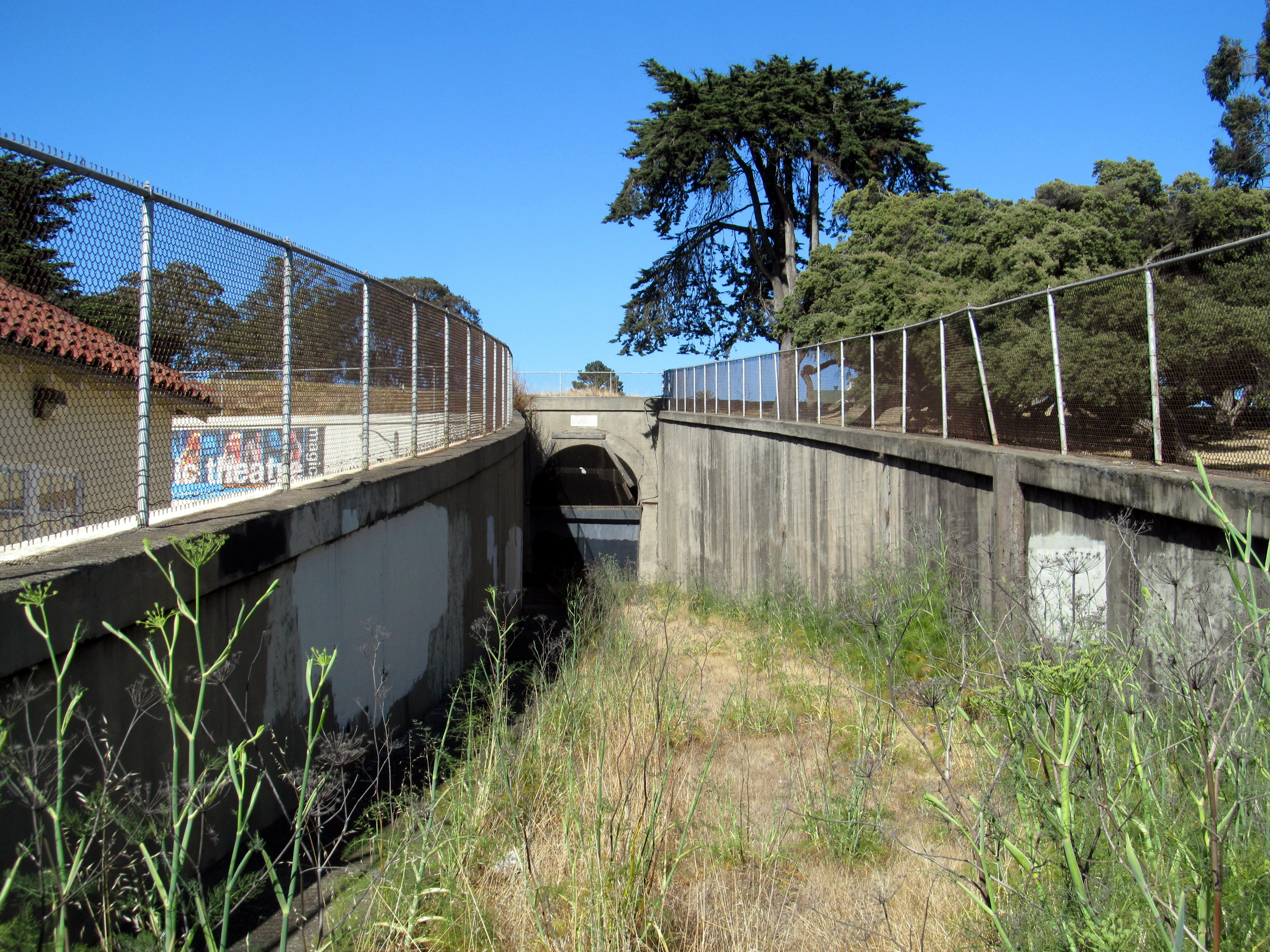
The disused Fort Mason Tunnel in 2017

An extension of the E Embarcadero to Aquatic Park is planned but is currently not fully funded. The extension would relocate the terminus from Jones and Beach station to a new station on Beach street adjacent to Aquatic Park.

The line could be extended past Aquatic Park in the future by the National Park Service's proposal to extend the route through the existing Fort Mason Tunnel and into Fort Mason Center. As of 2018, the SFMTA was attempting to secure funding for engineering studies in order to advance the project. The extension would serve Fort Mason Center and the Marina district, identified by the NPS as areas with "inadequate regional transit access" and "limited transportation options for transit-dependent residents," and providing those areas with a rail connection to regional transportation networks via the Market Street subway and the 4th and King Caltrain station.

== History ==
Muni's original E streetcar line was the E Union line, running north from the Ferry Building via The Embarcadero to Washington/Jackson streets, where it turned west to eventually reach the Presidio. This line was discontinued in 1947.

=== Streetcar demonstration ===
Proposals for historic streetcar service along The Embarcadero were first put forward in 1974, and the first mention of separate E Embarcadero and F Market lines was in 1981. In 1987, a temporary, demonstration streetcar service was operated along part of the Embarcadero as part of the 1987 San Francisco Historic Trolley Festival, to gauge public interest in, and the practicality of, a regular streetcar service. It ran along then-existing, but disused, San Francisco Belt Railroad tracks and operated two days a week for a little over five weeks, using two streetcars powered by electricity from portable diesel generators.

=== Previous E Embarcadero service ===
Light rail service on the section of The Embarcadero south of Folsom Street and on King Street to the Caltrain depot began on January 10, 1998, using a Muni Metro shuttle line between Embarcadero Station and the Caltrain station. This temporary line was designated E Embarcadero, and it was discontinued when it was replaced in August 1998 by an extension of the N Judah line. In 2007 the new T Third Street line also began operating on this extension.

=== Historic streetcar service ===
Historic streetcar service on The Embarcadero north of Don Chee Way began in March 2000 when the F Market & Wharves line was extended to Fisherman's Wharf. That extension and the 1998 light rail extension to the Caltrain Depot make up almost the entirety of the E line route; they were connected by unused tracks on The Embarcadero between Don Chee Way and Folsom Street.

=== Later changes ===
The new E Embarcadero line operated on a temporary basis during the 2013 America's Cup yacht races.

On March 28, 2014, the San Francisco Municipal Transportation Agency (SFMTA) officially approved plans for weekend-only service of the E Embarcadero heritage streetcar line starting in summer 2015, with weeklong service starting the next year. Weekend operation officially began on August 1, 2015, and weeklong service began on April 23, 2016.

=== Discontinuation ===
Service was suspended on March 17, 2020, due to the COVID-19 pandemic.

In 2025, the president and CEO of Market Street Railway said that restoration of E Embarcadero service was "not in the near-term", citing slower-than-anticipated development along the southern Embarcadero, particularly around Piers 30–32, and the existing service provided by light rail vehicles along the corridor. He also cited Muni's budgetary situation as a factor in any future revival of the line.

== Station/Stop listing ==
Though the right-of-way is shared with the two Muni Metro lines on the South of Market (SoMa) segment, the stations themselves are not shared with Muni Metro because historic cars cannot access elevated median boarding platforms. For this reason, existing sidewalk-level stops adjacent to each raised light-rail stop are utilized for the E line. For stops north of Market, the line uses those of the existing F Market & Wharves line. All stations on the line are accessible.

Station/Stop		Neighborhood	Connections and Notes
Inbound	Outbound	Neighborhood	Connections and Notes
Jones and Beach		Fisherman's Wharf	Market & Wharves; Powell–Hyde
Jefferson and Taylor	Beach and Mason	Fisherman's Wharf	Market & Wharves; Powell–Mason; Blue & Gold Fleet, San Francisco Bay Ferry (at Pier 41); Muni: 39, 47; Golden Gate Transit: 132, 154, 172
Jefferson and Powell	Beach and Mason	Fisherman's Wharf	Market & Wharves; Powell–Mason; Blue & Gold Fleet, San Francisco Bay Ferry (at Pier 41); Muni: 39, 47; Golden Gate Transit: 132, 154, 172
The Embarcadero and Stockton	Beach and Stockton	Fisherman's Wharf	Market & Wharves; Muni: 39; Serves Pier 39
Inbound splits from The Embarcadero towards Jefferson Street; outbound joins The Embarcadero from Beach Street
The Embarcadero and Bay			Market & Wharves; Alcatraz Cruises (at Pier 33); Muni: 8, 8BX; Golden Gate Transit: 132, 154, 172; Serves Pier 35
The Embarcadero and Sansome			Market & Wharves
The Embarcadero and Greenwich			Market & Wharves; Muni: 82X
The Embarcadero and Green			Market & Wharves; Serves Exploratorium
The Embarcadero and Broadway			Market & Wharves
The Embarcadero and Washington			Market & Wharves
Ferry Building		Financial District	BART: (at Embarcadero); (at Embarcadero); Market & Wharves; Golden Gate Ferry, San Francisco Bay Ferry, Treasure Island Ferry (at Ferry Building); Muni: 6, 7X, 9, 14, 14X, 21, 31; Golden Gate Transit, Presidio Go Shuttle, SamTrans
The Embarcadero and Folsom		SoMa	N Judah
The Embarcadero and Brannan		SoMa	N Judah
2nd and King		SoMa	Serves Oracle Park
4th and King		SoMa	Caltrain; Muni: 10, 30, 45, 47, 81X, 82X, 83X; Flixbus
