= The Embarcadero and Bay station =

Streetcar station in San Francisco, California, USA

Bay & The Embarcadero
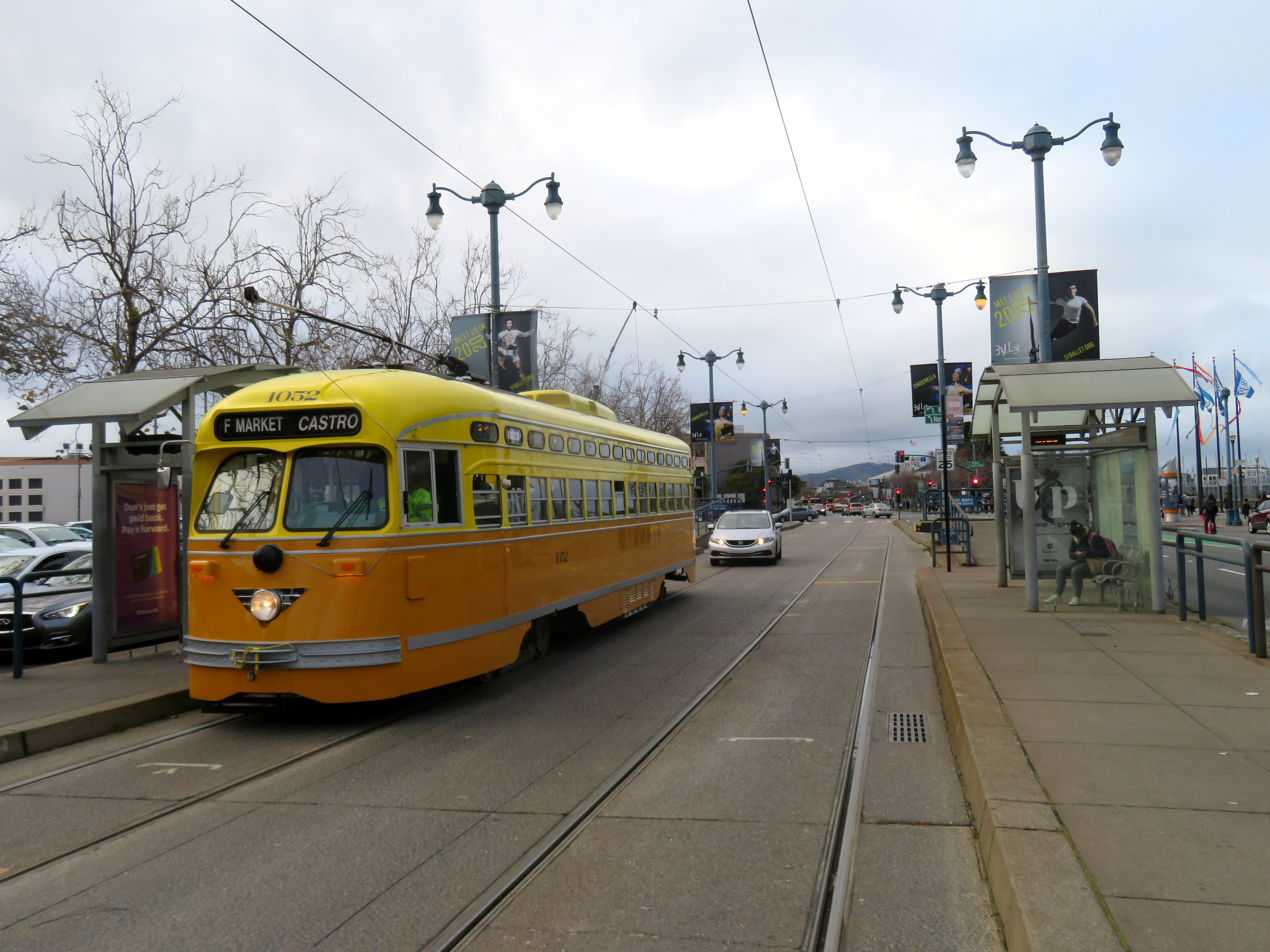
- Streetcar at The Embarcadero and Bay in January 2020

General information
- Location: The Embarcadero at Bay Street; San Francisco, California
- Coordinates: 37°48′25″N 122°24′23″W
- Platforms: 2 side platforms
- Tracks: 2
- Connections: Muni: 8, 8BX

Construction
- Accessible: Yes

History
- Opened: March 4, 2000

Services
Preceding station	Muni	Following station
The Embarcadero and Stockton toward Jones and Beach	F Market & Wharves	The Embarcadero and Sansome toward 17th Street and Castro
Beach and Stockton One-way operation	F Market & Wharves	The Embarcadero and Sansome toward 17th Street and Castro
Former services
Preceding station	Muni	Following station
The Embarcadero and Stockton toward Jones and Beach	E Embarcadero	The Embarcadero and Sansome toward 4th and King
Beach and Stockton One-way operation	E Embarcadero	The Embarcadero and Sansome toward 4th and King
Location

The Embarcadero and Bay station is a streetcar station in San Francisco, California, serving the San Francisco Municipal Railway's F Market & Wharves historic streetcar line. It is located on The Embarcadero at Bay Street. The station opened on March 4, 2000, with the streetcar's extension to Fisherman's Wharf.

The stop is also served by routes 8 and 8BX (a weekday peak hours express service), plus the L Owl bus route, which provides service along the F Market & Wharves and L Taraval lines during the late night hours when trains do not operate.
