= The Embarcadero and Sansome station =

Sansome & The Embarcadero
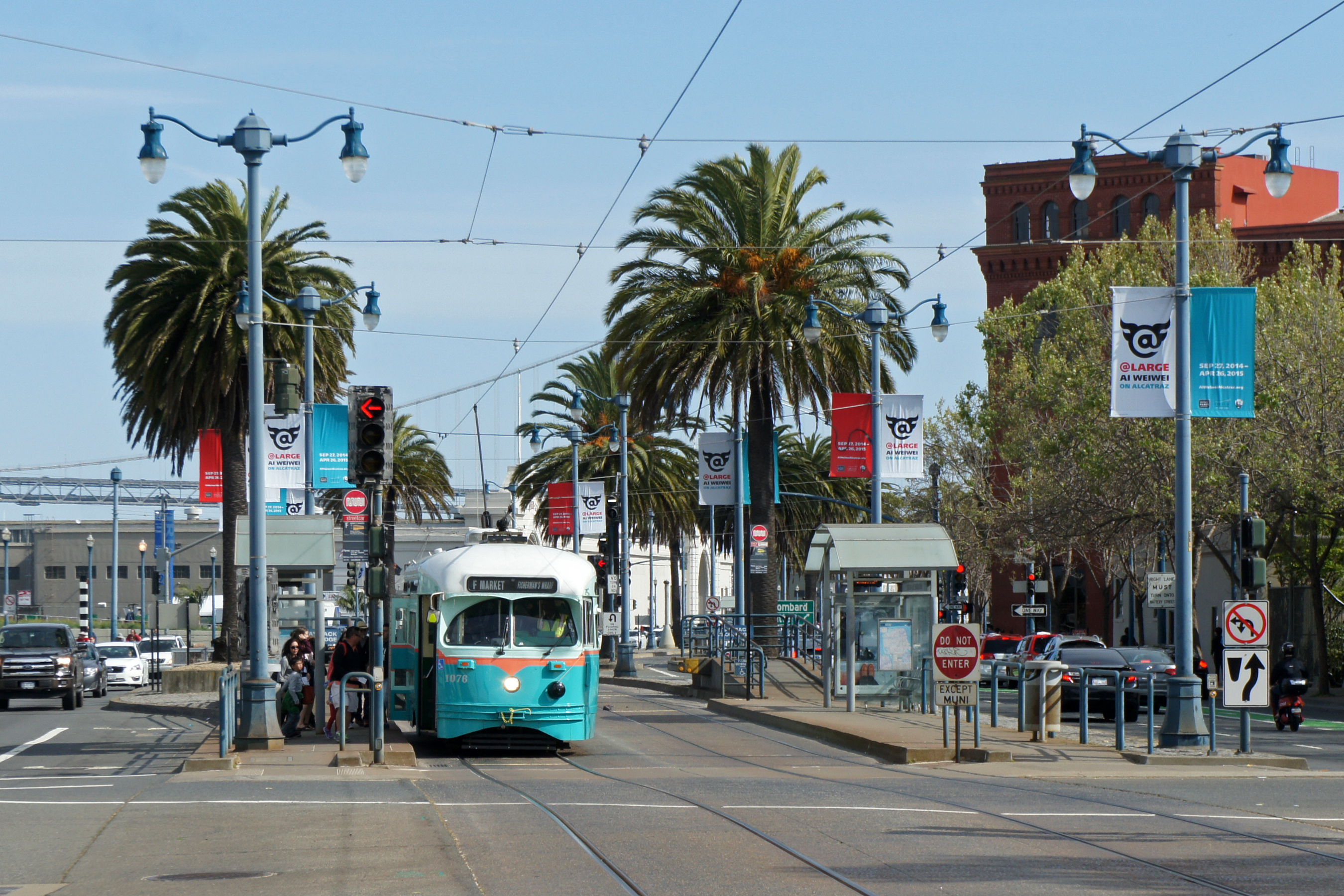
- Sansome and The Embarcadero station in 2015

General information
- Location: The Embarcadero at Sansome Street; San Francisco, California
- Coordinates: 37°48′18″N 122°24′12″W
- Platforms: 2 side platforms
- Tracks: 2

Construction
- Accessible: Yes

History
- Opened: March 4, 2000

Services
Preceding station	Muni	Following station
The Embarcadero and Bay toward Jones and Beach	F Market & Wharves	The Embarcadero and Greenwich toward 17th Street and Castro
Former services
Preceding station	Muni	Following station
The Embarcadero and Bay toward Jones and Beach	E Embarcadero	The Embarcadero and Greenwich toward 4th and King
Location

The Embarcadero and Sansome station is a streetcar station in San Francisco, California, serving the San Francisco Municipal Railway's F Market & Wharves historic streetcar line. It is located on The Embarcadero at Chestnut and Sansome Streets. The station opened on March 4, 2000, with the streetcar's extension to Fisherman's Wharf.

The stop is served by the L Owl bus route, which provides service along the F Market & Wharves and L Taraval lines during the late night hours when trains do not operate.
