= Market and Dolores / Market and Buchanan stations =

Market and Dolores Market and Buchanan
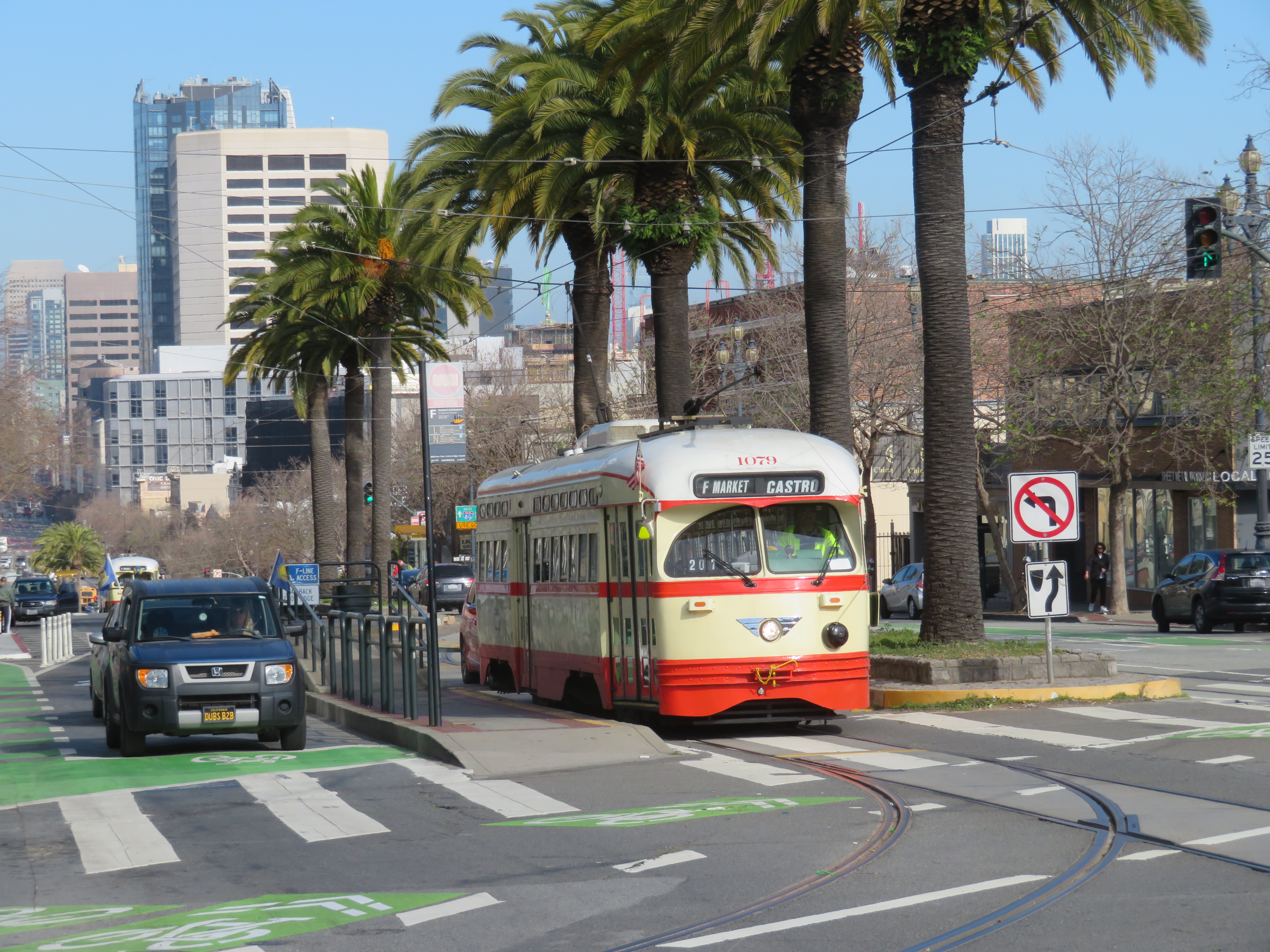
- An westbound streetcar at Market and Buchanan in January 2019

General information
- Location: Market Street at Dolores and Buchanan Streets; San Francisco, California
- Coordinates: 37°46′10″N 122°25′35″W
- Platforms: 2 side platforms
- Tracks: 2
- Connections: Muni: xxx

Construction
- Accessible: Yes

History
- Rebuilt: September 1, 1995

Services
Preceding station	Muni	Following station
Market and Church toward 17th Street and Castro	F Market & Wharves	Market and Guerrero / Market and Laguna toward Jones and Beach
Location

Market and Dolores (eastbound) and Market and Buchanan (westbound) are a pair of one-way light rail stations in San Francisco, California, United States, serving the San Francisco Municipal Railway F Market & Wharves heritage railway line. They are located on Market Street at the intersections with Dolores Street and Buchanan Street.

In 2021–22, new decorative railings were added on both boarding islands as part of the Upper Market Street Safety Project. They feature a quote from Harvey Milk's 1977 "You've Got to Have Hope" speech, as well as an illustration of streetcar #1051, which is dedicated in Milk's honor.
