= Market and Gough station =

Market and Gough
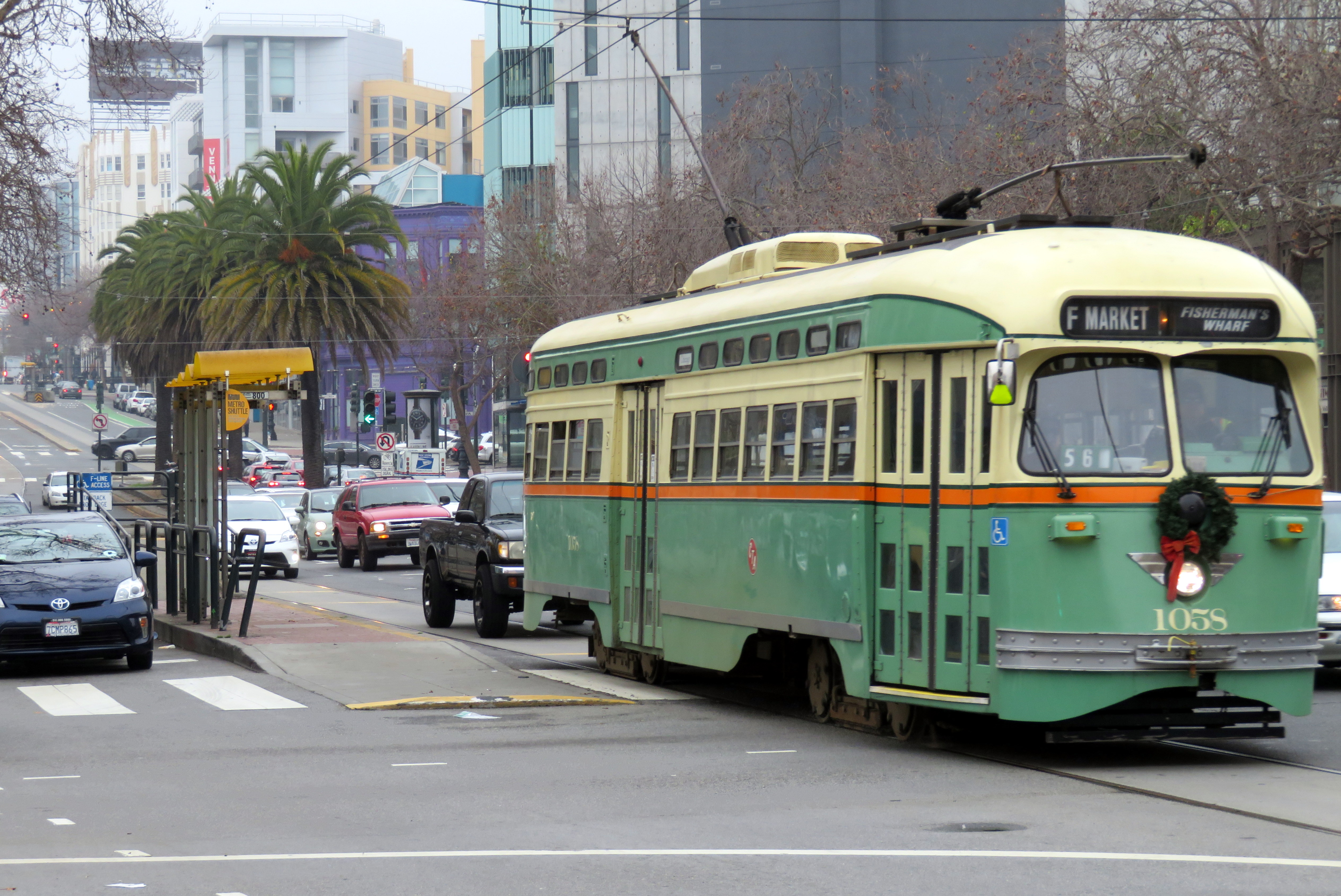
- Streetcar at Market and Gough in January 2018

General information
- Location: Market Street at Gough Street; San Francisco, California
- Coordinates: 37°46′23″N 122°25′22″W
- Platforms: 2 side platforms
- Tracks: 2

Construction
- Accessible: Yes

History
- Rebuilt: September 1, 1995

Services
Preceding station	Muni	Following station
Market and Guerrero / Market and Laguna toward 17th Street and Castro	F Market & Wharves	Van Ness toward Jones and Beach
Location

Market and Gough is a light rail station in San Francisco, California, serving the San Francisco Municipal Railway F Market & Wharves heritage railway line. It is located on Market Street at the intersections of Haight Street and Gough Street.

Under the proposed Western Variant of the planned Better Market Street project, the inbound stop would be moved across the intersection.
