= Market and Sanchez station =

Market and Sanchez
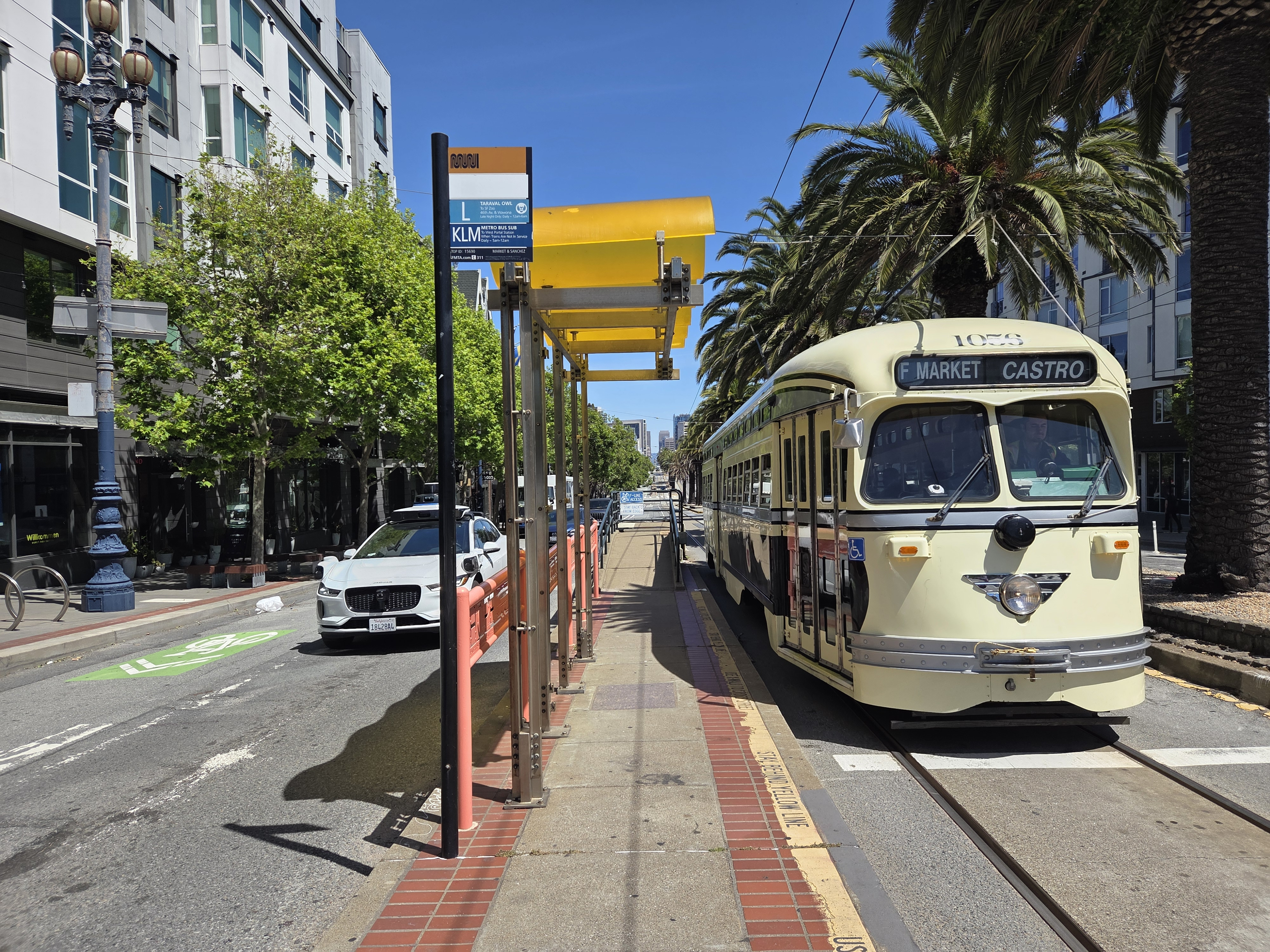
- A westbound streetcar at Market and Sanchez in 2026

General information
- Location: Market Street at Sanchez Street; San Francisco, California
- Coordinates: 37°45′58″N 122°25′52″W
- Platforms: 2 side platforms (boarding islands)
- Tracks: 2

Construction
- Accessible: Yes

History
- Rebuilt: September 1, 1995

Services
| Preceding station | Muni | Following station |
|---|---|---|
| Market and Noe toward 17th Street and Castro | F Market & Wharves | Market and Church toward Jones and Beach |
Location

Market and Sanchez station is a light rail station in San Francisco, California, United States, serving the San Francisco Municipal Railway F Market & Wharves heritage railway line. It is located on Market Street at the intersections of 15th Street and Sanchez Street.

In 2022, new decorative railings were added on both boarding islands as part of the Upper Market Street Safety Project. They feature a quote from Harvey Milk's 1977 "You've Got to Have Hope" speech, as well as an illustration of streetcar #1051, which is dedicated in Milk's honor.
