= The Embarcadero and Stockton station =

Stockton & The Embarcadero
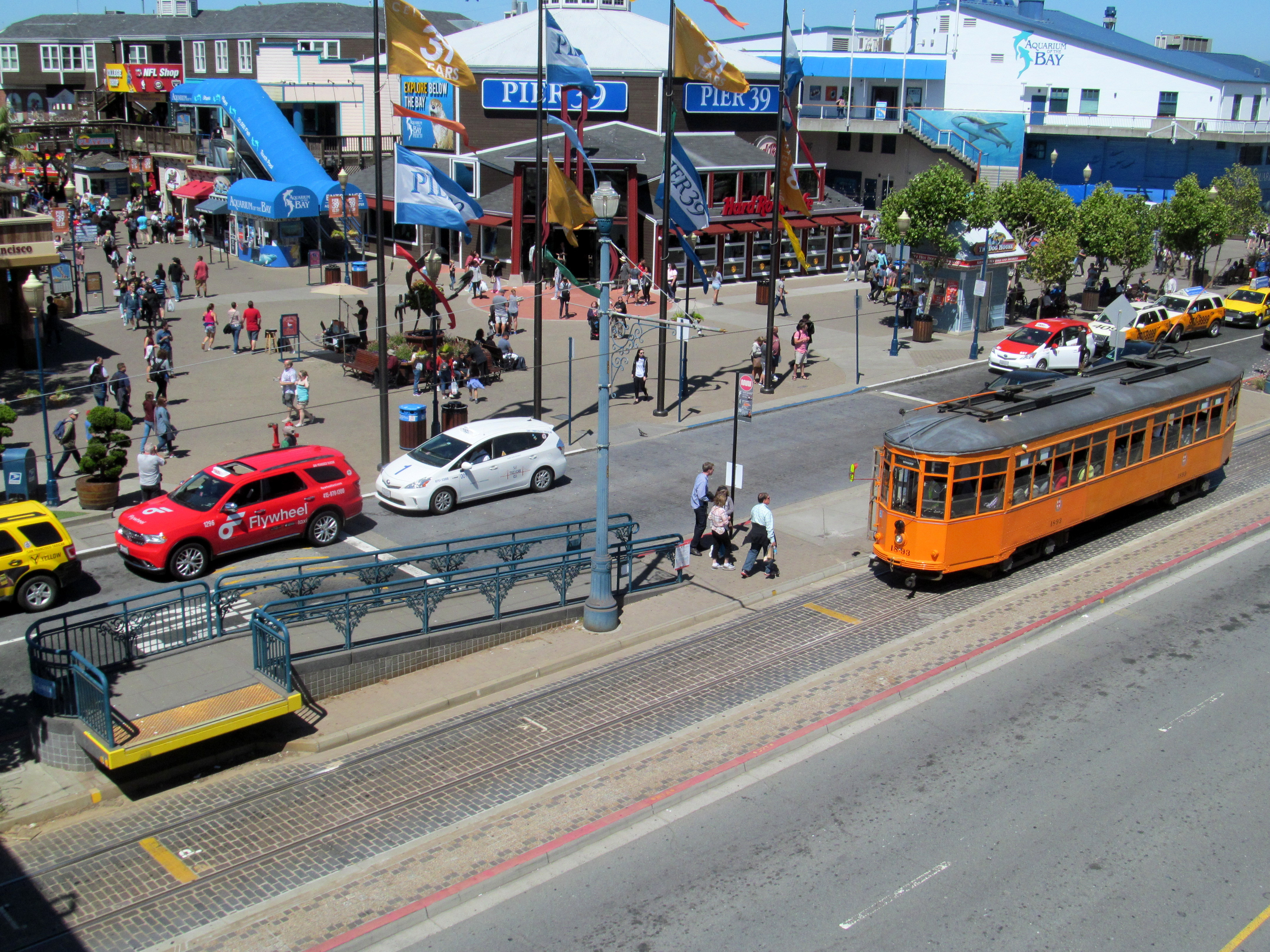
- A streetcar at the station in June 2017

General information
- Location: The Embarcadero at Stockton Street (Pier 39); San Francisco, California
- Coordinates: 37°48′30″N 122°24′37″W
- Platforms: 1 side platform
- Tracks: 2
- Connections: Muni: 39

Construction
- Accessible: Yes

History
- Opened: March 4, 2000

Services
Preceding station	Muni	Following station
Jefferson and Powell toward Jones and Beach	F Market & Wharves	The Embarcadero and Bay One-way operation
Former services
Preceding station	Muni	Following station
Jefferson and Powell toward Jones and Beach	E Embarcadero	The Embarcadero and Bay One-way operation
Location

The Embarcadero and Stockton station (also signed as Pier 39 station) is a streetcar station in the Fisherman's Wharf district of San Francisco, California, serving the San Francisco Municipal Railway's F Market & Wharves historic streetcar line. It is located on The Embarcadero at Stockton Street, in front of Pier 39. The station opened on March 4, 2000, with the streetcar's extension to Fisherman's Wharf.

The stop is also served by the route 39 bus, plus the L Owl bus route, which provides service along the F Market & Wharves and L Taraval lines during the late night hours when trains do not operate.
