= F Market & Wharves =

San Francisco heritage streetcar line

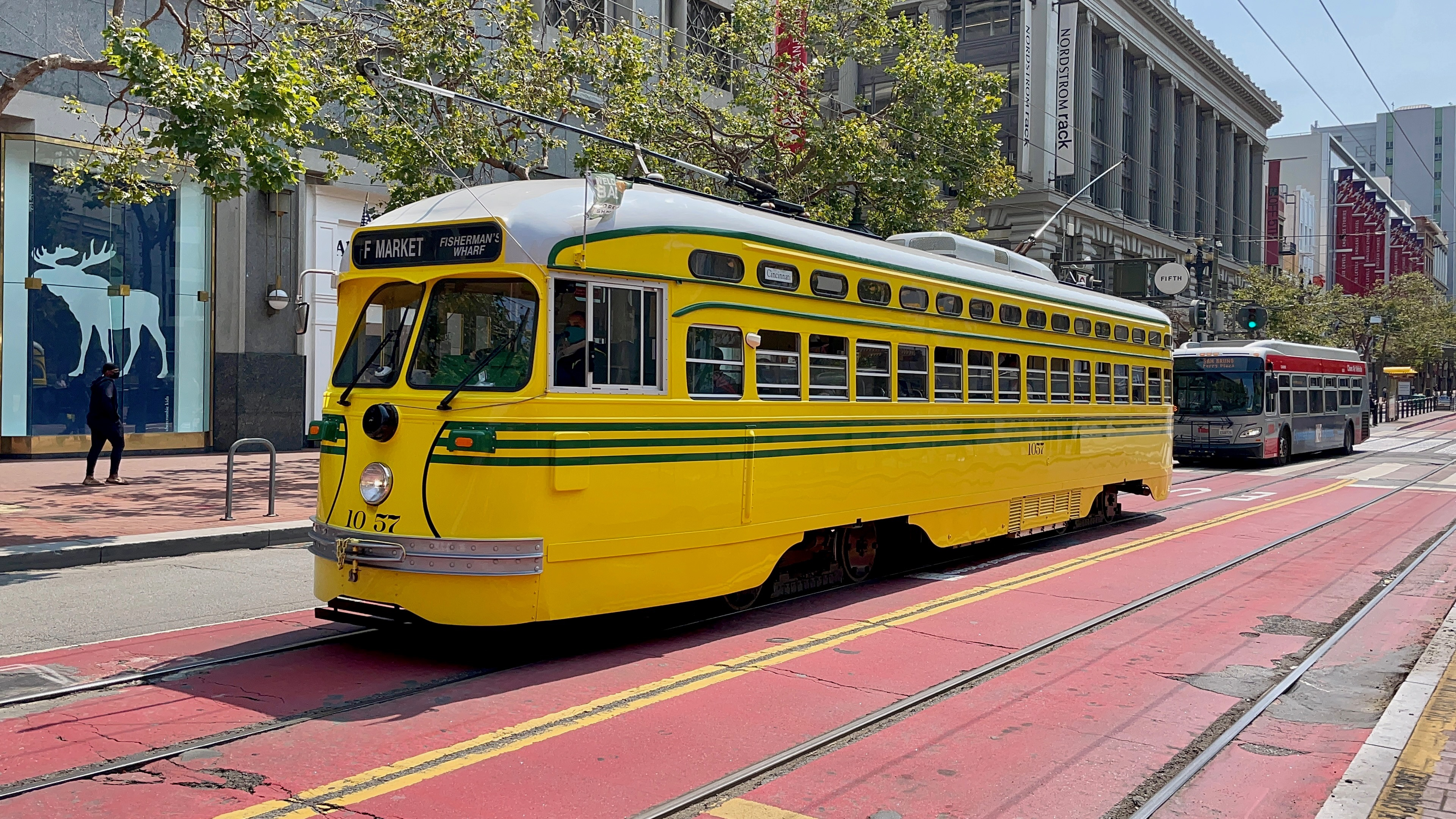
- Car 1057 painted in the colors of the Cincinnati Street Railway Company

Overview
- Owner: San Francisco Municipal Transportation Agency
- Locale: San Francisco, California
- Termini: Jones and Beach; 17th Street and Castro
- Stations: 32

Service
- Type: Heritage streetcar
- System: San Francisco Municipal Railway
- Operator: San Francisco Municipal Railway
- Rolling stock: PCC streetcars; other historic streetcars
- Daily ridership: 19,700 (2019)

History
- Opened: 1982–1987 (special summer service); September 1, 1995 (revenue service)

Technical
- Line length: 6 mi (9.7 km)
- Character: At grade, street running
- Track gauge: 4 ft 8 1/2 in (1,435 mm) standard gauge
- Electrification: Overhead line, 600 V DC
Route map
F Market & Wharves highlighted in brown

The F Market & Wharves line is one of several light rail lines in San Francisco, California. Unlike most other lines in the system, the F line runs as a heritage streetcar service, almost exclusively using historic equipment from San Francisco's retired fleet and from cities around the world (although buses are added during peak commute hours). While the F line is operated by the San Francisco Municipal Railway (Muni), its operation is supported by Market Street Railway, a nonprofit organization of streetcar enthusiasts which raises funds and helps to restore vintage streetcars.

Introduced as the F Market in 1983, in the first San Francisco Historic Trolley Festival, the service originally operated between the Castro District and the Transbay Terminal, continuing to do so after being launched as a full-time, year-round service in 1995. In March 2000, it was extended at its eastern end to the Embarcadero and northwards along that street to Fisherman's Wharf, and a short section of the route between Market Street and the Transbay Terminal was discontinued.

Despite its heritage status, the F Market & Wharves line is an integral part of Muni's intermodal urban transport network, operating at frequent intervals for 20 hours a day, seven days a week. It carries local commuters and tourists alike, linking residential, business and leisure oriented areas of the city. Unlike the San Francisco cable car system, the cheaper standard Muni fare system applies.

== History ==
=== Previous F-Line ===
Cable car operations along Market Street began in 1888. Service was electrified in 1906.

In 1915, the San Francisco Municipal Railway started the F-Stockton route, which ran from Laguna (later Scott) and Chestnut Streets in the Marina down Stockton Street to 4th and Market Streets near Union Square, later extended to the Southern Pacific Depot (currently the Caltrain Depot) in 1947. The streetcar line was discontinued in 1951 and was replaced by the 30 Stockton trolleybus route, which still runs today.

The F-line designation was therefore available for use by the current line, although that service is over a completely different route from the F-line of 1915 to 1951.

=== Previous lines on Market Street ===
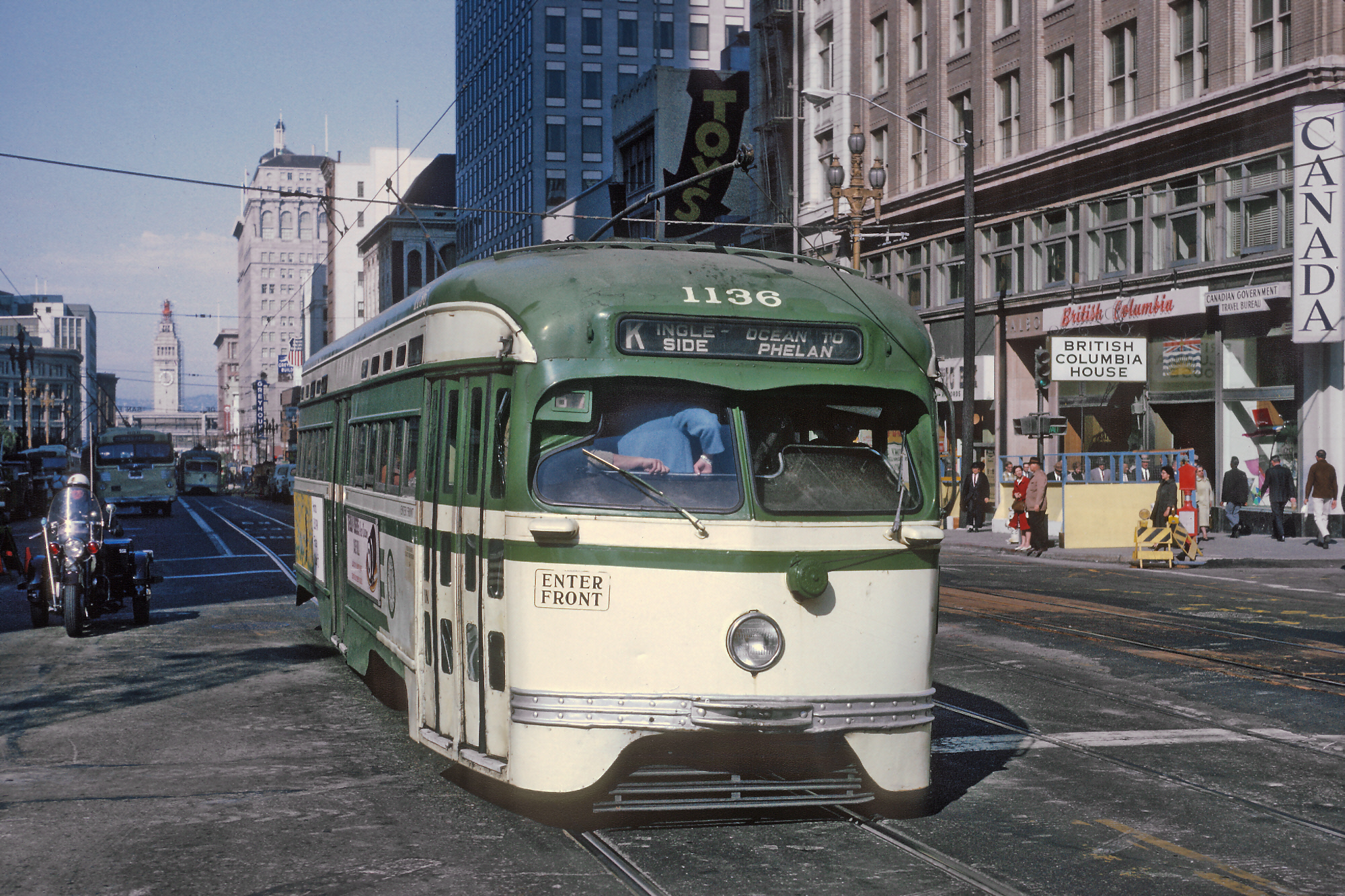
A PCC streetcar on the K Ingleside route on Market Street in 1967

Market Street is a major transit artery for the city of San Francisco, and has carried in turn horse-drawn streetcars, cable cars and electric streetcars. In the 1960s construction began on the Market Street subway, which would carry BART's trains on its lower level. All streetcar lines currently operating in the subway previously ran on the surface of Market Street, and were eventually diverted into the upper level of the tunnel. This diversion, together with the provision of new light rail cars, resulted in today's Muni Metro system.

The diversion of the Market Street streetcar lines into tunnel and the replacement of the existing streetcars with new light rail cars was completed by November 1982. However, the street trackage on Market Street was retained, and many of the old streetcars were still in storage.

=== Historic trolley festivals ===
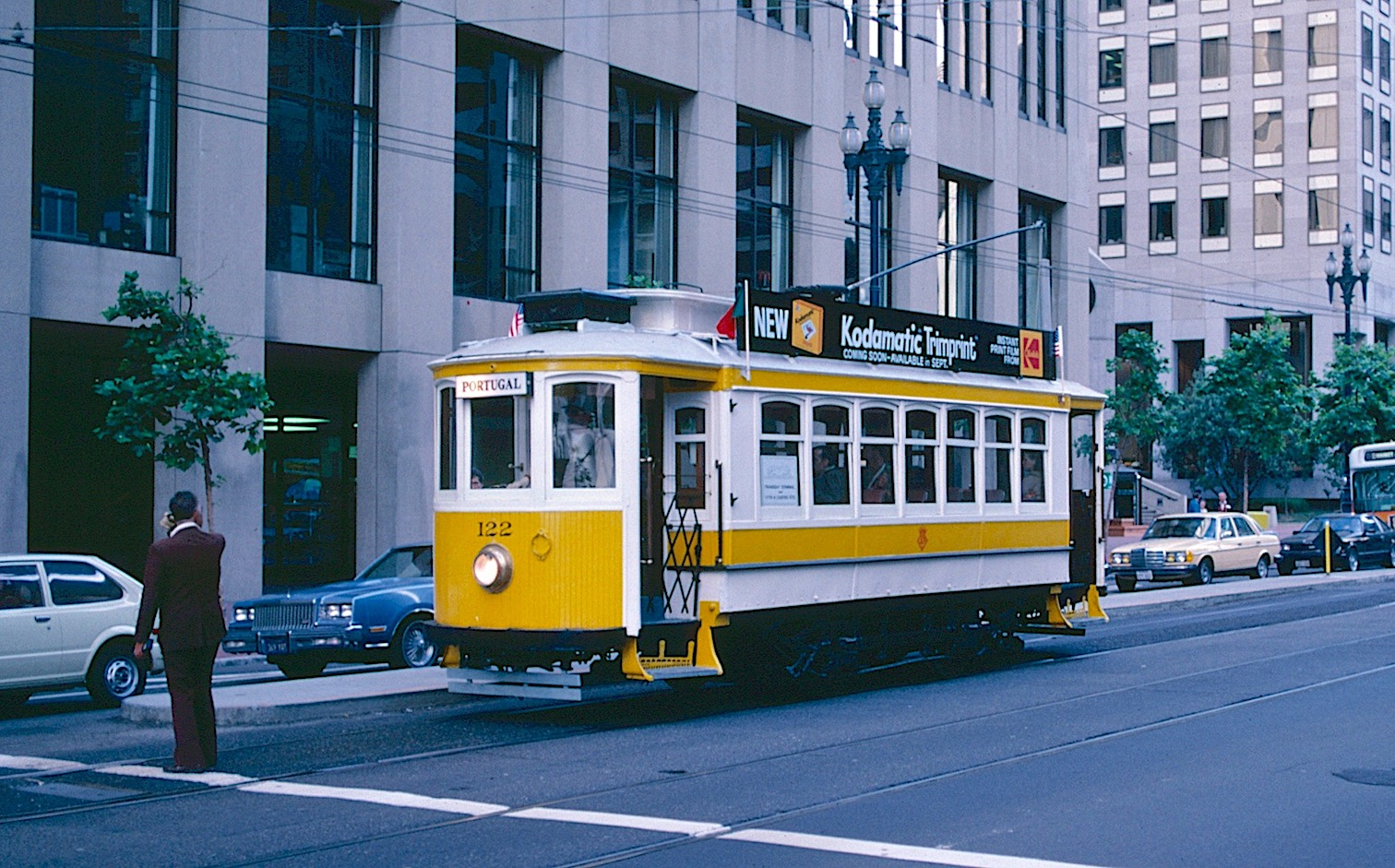
Porto car 122 on Market Street in 1983, during the first Historic Trolley Festival

In 1982, San Francisco's cable car lines were shut down for almost two years to allow for a major rebuild. Temporary weekend historic streetcar service started on July 3, 1982 as part of 4th of July celebrations and ran until September of that year. To provide a more regular alternative tourist attraction during this period, the San Francisco Historic Trolley Festivals began in 1983. These summertime operations of vintage streetcars on Market Street were a joint project of the San Francisco Chamber of Commerce and Muni.

The trolley festival route went from the Transbay Terminal at First and Mission Streets to Market, then up the retained Market Street tracks to Duboce Avenue. From there, it followed a 'temporary' streetcar detour built in the 1970s to bypass subway construction under Market: Duboce, Church Street, and 17th Street to Castro.

=== F-Market Line ===
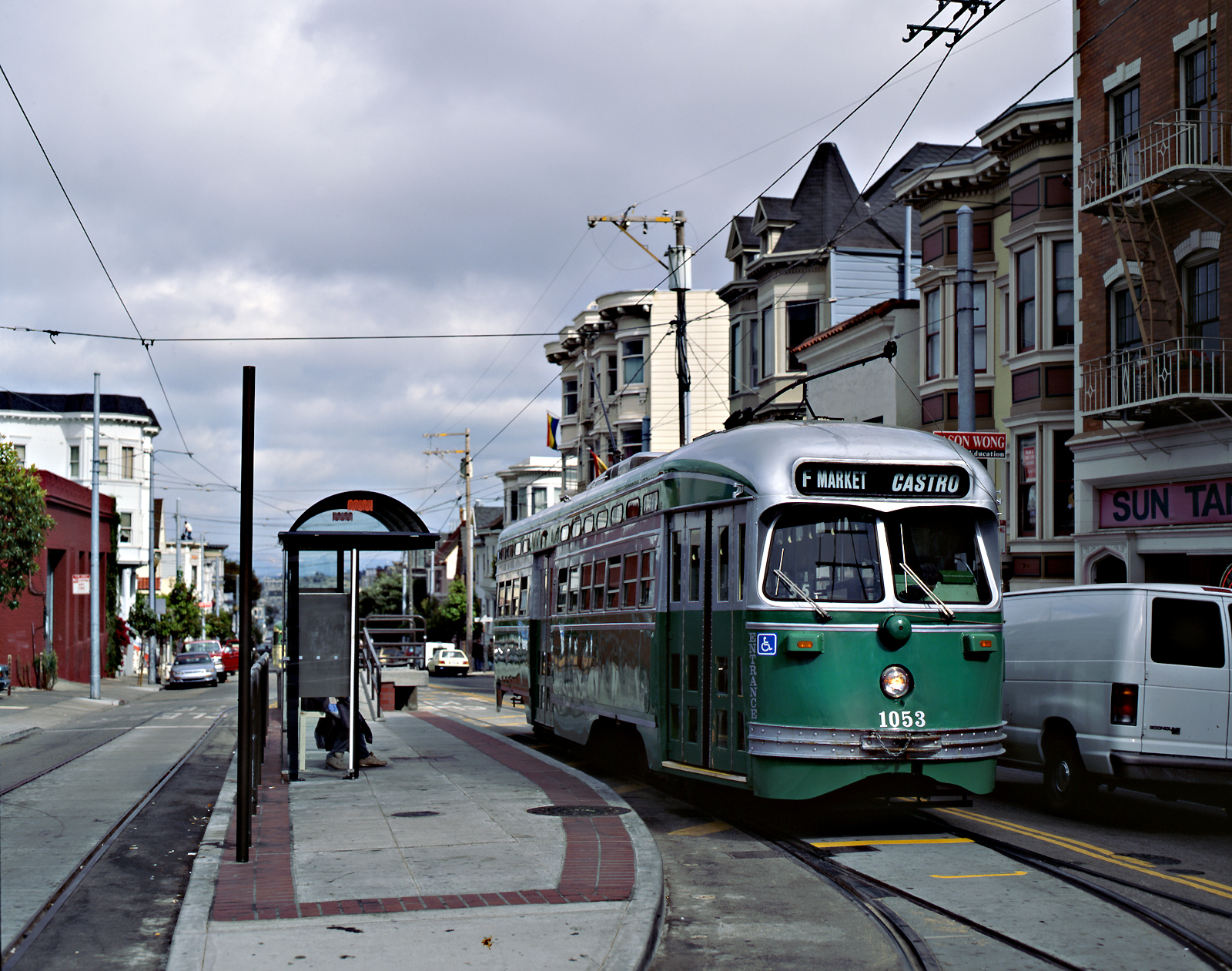
Streetcar #1053 at 17th and Castro in 1999

The Trolley Festival proved so successful it was repeated every year until 1987. In that year, preparation began for the introduction of a permanent F line. After that year's festival finished, Muni replaced the old Market Street tracks with new ones, restoring tracks to upper Market Street and recreating a line to Castro. Different types of vintage streetcars were evaluated to provide the backbone of the F-line fleet, resulting in the decision to use the PCC car, due in part to its historic San Francisco transit use. Fourteen such cars were acquired second-hand from Philadelphia to add to three of Muni's own retired double-ended PCCs.

On September 1, 1995, the F line opened with a parade of PCC cars, painted to represent some of the two dozen North American cities that this type of streetcar once served. Ridership exceeded expectations and the 8-Market trolleybus route that it had mostly replaced was completely discontinued on December 29, 1995. At that point in history, this was a rare instance in which a streetcar replaced a bus line in operation, rather than the other way around. The need for extra cars resulted in the acquisition of ten Peter Witt-style cars that were just being retired in the city of Milan, Italy. These cars were built in the 1920s to a design once common in North American cities, and their sister cars are still widely used on the Milan tramway network.

=== Extension on the Embarcadero ===
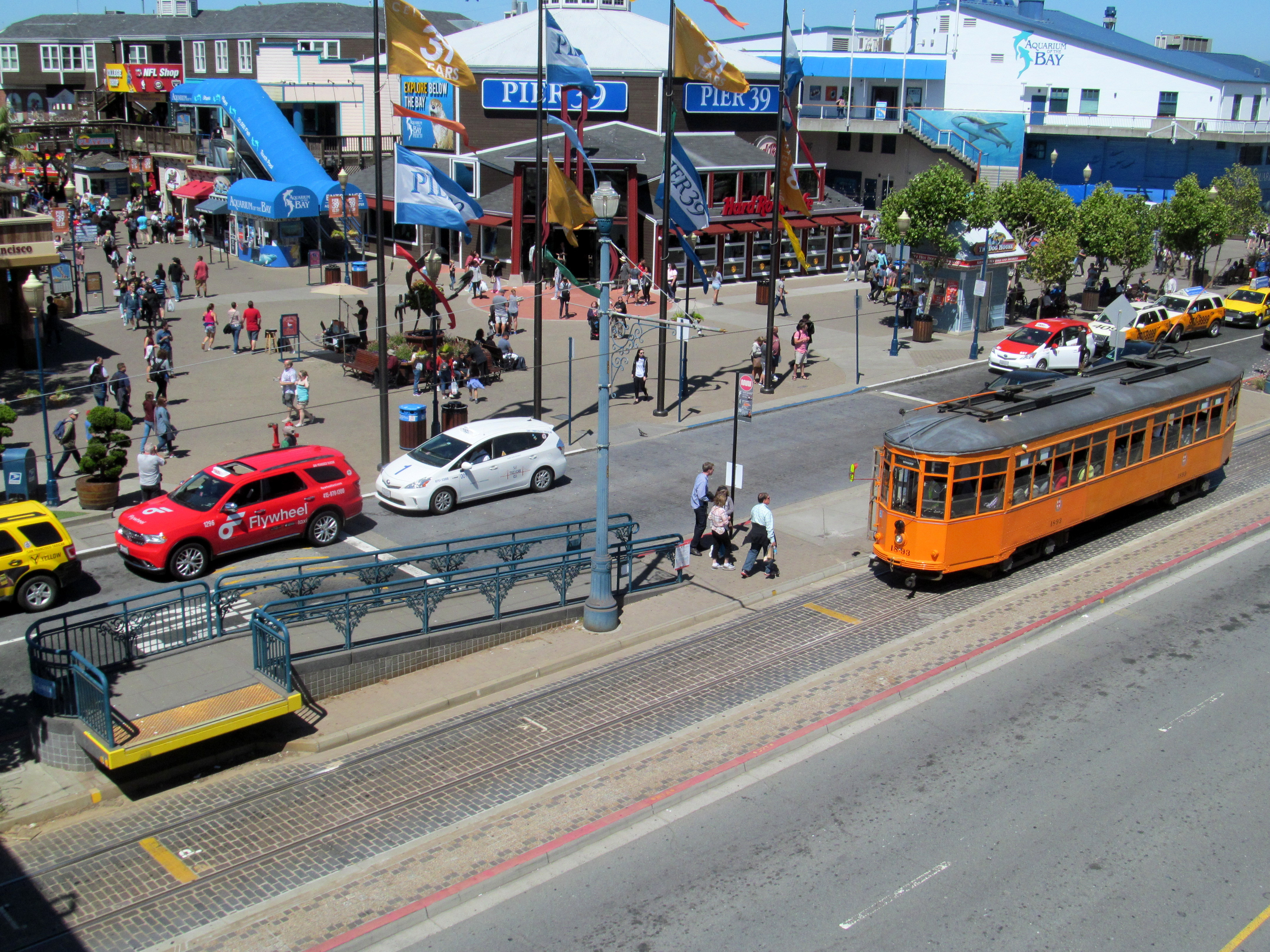
An F Market & Wharves streetcar at Pier 39

The Embarcadero is the eastern waterfront roadway of San Francisco, along San Francisco Bay. At one time busy with port and ferry related traffic, it fell into decline as freight transferred to the container terminals of Oakland and the Bay Bridge replaced the ferries. In the 1960s the elevated Embarcadero Freeway was built above, dividing the city from the bay, but was condemned and demolished after the 1989 Loma Prieta earthquake. Proposals for streetcar service along The Embarcadero were put forward as early as 1974, and historic streetcar service along The Embarcadero was first provided during the 1987 Trolley Festival, using existing Belt Railroad tracks on The Embarcadero and towed diesel generators to provide power.

With the freeway demolished, the waterfront started to be redeveloped for leisure and tourist activities, similar to Fisherman's Wharf and Pier 39 at the northern end of the waterfront. To support this redevelopment, it was decided to rebuild the Embarcadero as a tree-lined boulevard with streetcar tracks in the median. The section north of Market Street was to be served by an extension of the F line. Tracks were extended on the northern end of Market to connect with the Embarcadero tracks. On March 4, 2000, service on the F line began operating along the new extension to Fisherman's Wharf, replacing bus route 32. Service on the short section of the F line between Market Street and the Transbay Terminal was discontinued at that time. The last F-line trip departed from the Transbay Terminal at 12:55 a.m. on the night of March 3, and the track was abandoned in August 2000, the final use being a "farewell" trip by 1916-built work car C1 on August 18, with track removal beginning soon afterwards.

A month after the opening of the extension, Muni dedicated a car to Herb Caen, the noted columnist for the San Francisco Chronicle perhaps most famous for coining the phrase Baghdad by the Bay to describe The City. The car, Streetcar No. 130, which was originally delivered in 1914, contains wood paneling and is decorated with many quotes from Caen.

Service was suspended in March 2020 during the COVID-19 pandemic. It resumed on May 15, 2021, with limited hours; full hours resumed on June 26. Additional weekend afternoon short turn service between Fisherman's Wharf and the Ferry Building, operated by buses rather than streetcars, was added effective June 10, 2023.

=== Better Market Street ===
The Better Market Street project, a streetscape project launched in the late 2000s to improve Market Street, has a transit component that aims to improve the operations of the F Line. The project would consolidate and eliminate some stops on Market Street and would also construct a new turn-around loop for the F Line at McAllister and 7th Streets. The loop would allow increased service between Fisherman's Wharf and the Civic Center area, which is the section of the line with the highest ridership. Average headways under the service improvement would be 5 minutes instead of the current 7.5-minute scheduled headways.

In 2022, the city was forced to return a $15-million federal grant when it was revealed that they did not expect any construction of the loop to begin before the federally-mandated deadline of September 2025. Construction was shelved indefinitely.

=== Proposed extension ===
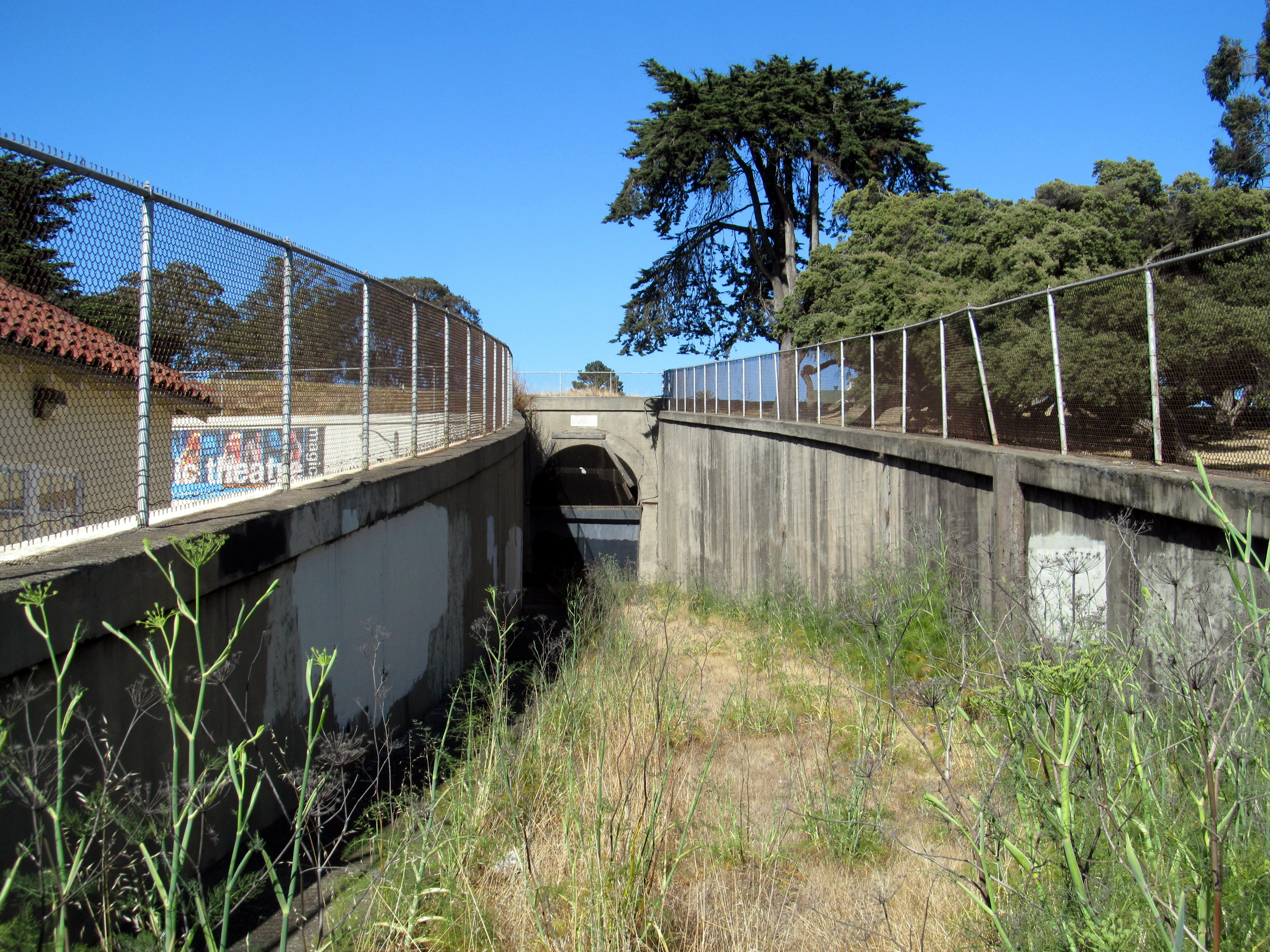
The abandoned railway tunnel under Fort Mason would be part of a planned extension

Muni completed a technical feasibility study to extend the F-Line from the vicinity of the existing Jones Street terminal with the assistance of the National Park Service in December 2004. The extended line would extend westward alongside the San Francisco Maritime Museum and Aquatic Park and then through the historic (1914) but disused single-track Fort Mason Tunnel, formerly owned by the State Belt Railroad.

An Environmental Impact Statement (EIS) for the extension, again led by the National Park Service, commenced in May 2006, resulting in:

- a draft conceptual engineering report, issued in January 2009
- a proposed transit operations plan, issued in July 2009
- a draft EIS, issued in March 2011
- the Final EIS, issued in February 2012

The final document classified areas west of the Fort Mason Tunnel as having "inadequate regional transit access...limited transportation options for transit-dependent residents...[and] infrastructure constraints impacting effectiveness and operations of Fort Mason Center." The Final EIS named a double-tracked extension along Beach Street, a jog north to Aquatic Park, then across Van Ness Avenue to single-tracked service through a retrofitted Fort Mason Tunnel and to a terminus in the Fort Mason Center parking lot as the "preferred alternative".

== Car fleet ==
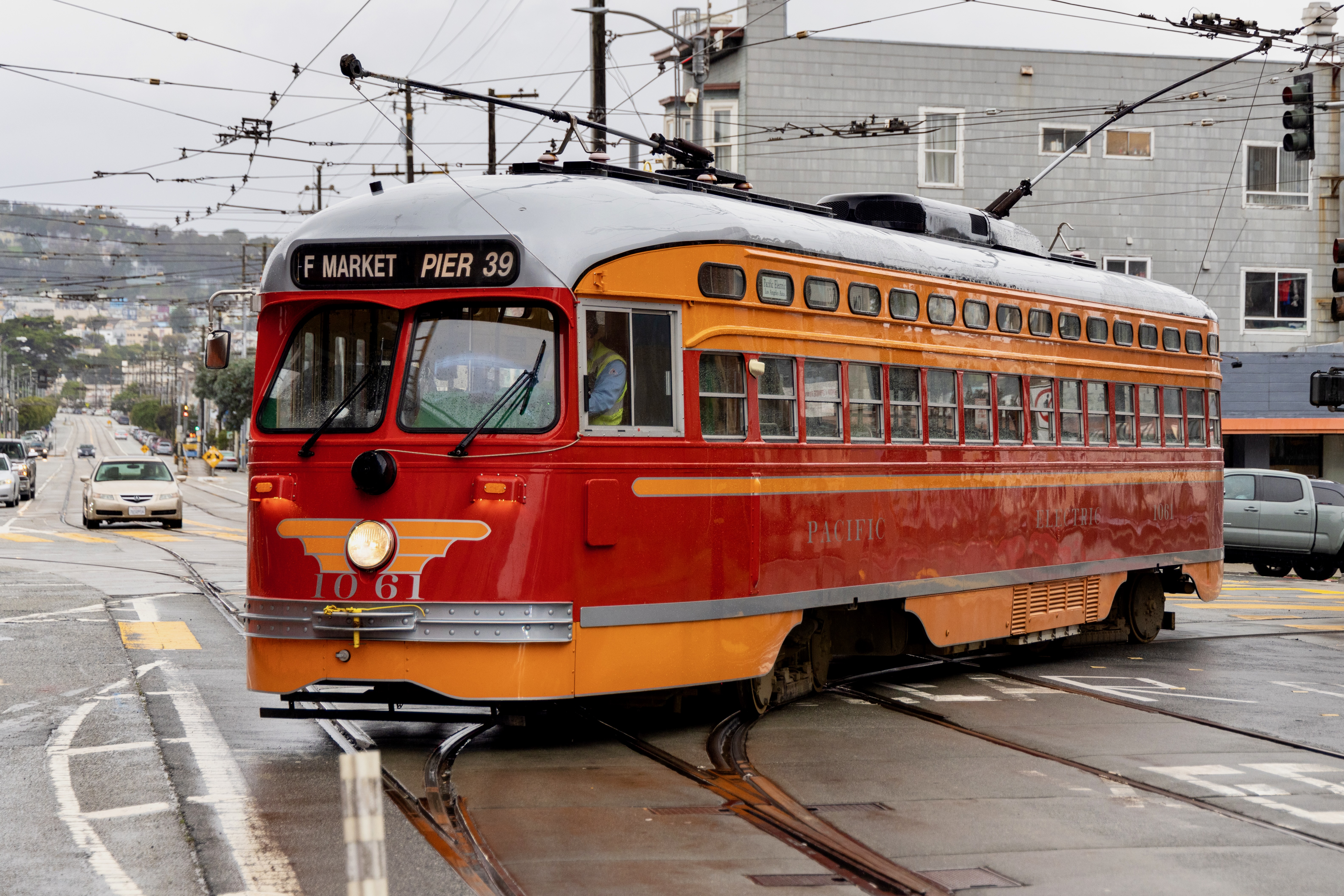
PCC Car #1061 with the Pacific Electric livery at the Cameron Beach Yard.

Muni owns a large selection of equipment for use on the F line, although not all of them are in service at the same time. The car fleet includes four sub-fleets: PCC streetcars, Peter Witt streetcars, pre-PCC veteran streetcars from San Francisco, and a diverse collection of 10 streetcars and trams from various overseas operators.

The line is principally operated by a mixture of the PCC and Peter Witt cars, although other more unusual or historic cars are often in service (including the 913 and 952, iconic streetcars named Desire since they are from New Orleans). The modern LRVs used by Muni Metro cannot be used on F Market & Wharves tracks because the overhead line is not compatible with pantograph operation (though the older streetcars can operate on most surface sections of the Muni Metro system).

=== PCC fleet ===
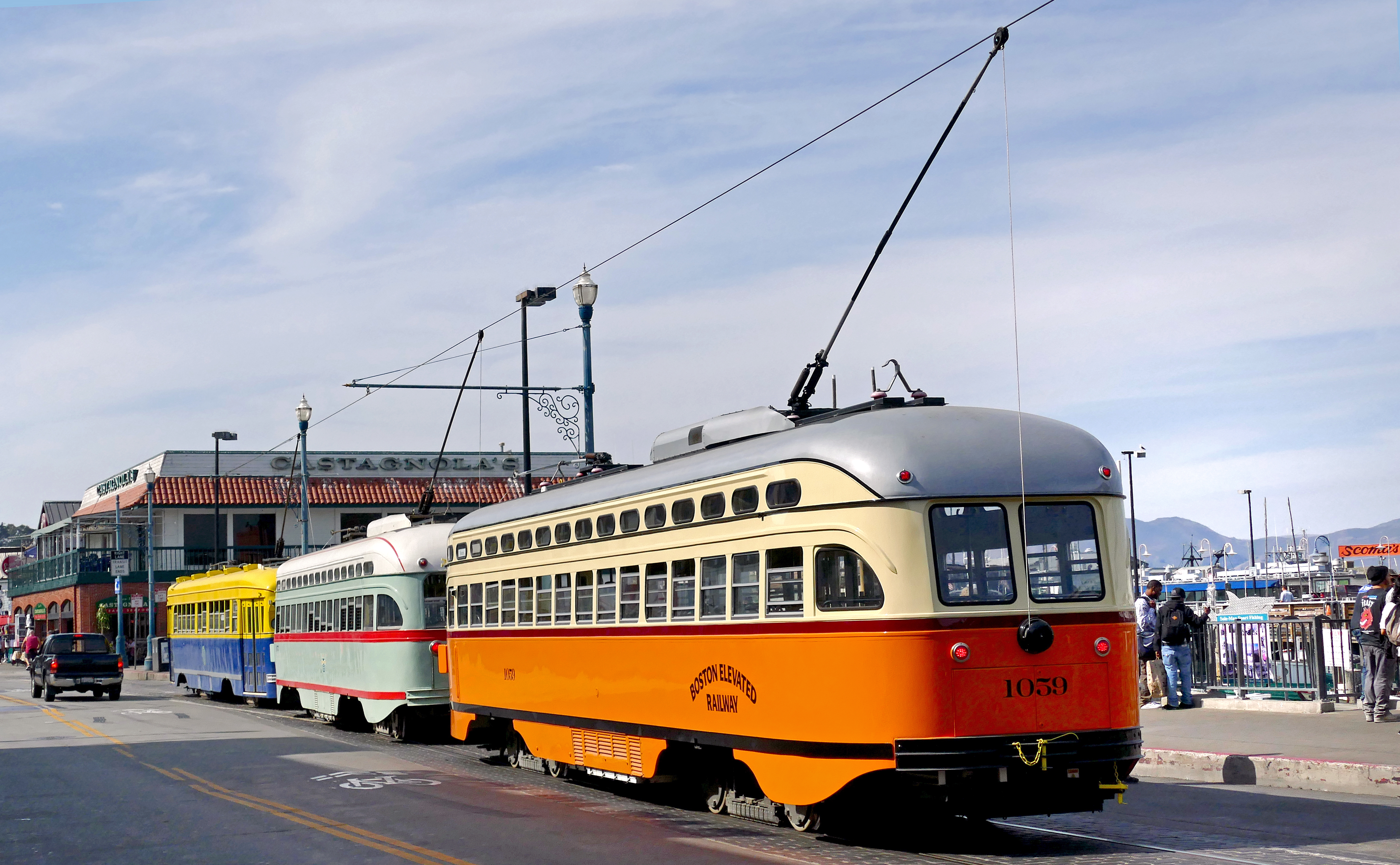
Three streetcars – original Muni #1010, ex-Newark #1073, and ex-SEPTA #1059 – on Jefferson Street

A fleet of PCC streetcars from San Francisco, Philadelphia, and Newark, built between 1946 and 1948, operate on the line. As of August 2007, MUNI was operating 27 of these cars, restored to various states of service. Among the restored cars in service, three are original San Francisco double-ended PCC cars. Another 16 cars are single-ended cars acquired from SEPTA in Philadelphia in 1992 (which continues to operate another 18 cars today, retrofitted for ADA compliance), while the remaining 11 cars are single-ended cars acquired from New Jersey Transit in Newark in 2002 (built originally for Minneapolis-St. Paul and acquired from that system in 1953).

MUNI has another 30 unrestored PCC cars in long-term storage. The unrestored cars include five additional San Francisco double-ended cars, 10 San Francisco single-ended cars, 12 single-ended cars acquired from St. Louis in 1957, two single-ended cars from Philadelphia, and two single-ended cars from Pittsburgh. A further previously restored car from Philadelphia was written off after a traffic accident in 2003.

Many of the restored cars are painted in the color schemes of prominent past and present PCC streetcar operators, including Muni itself and other transit systems.

=== Peter Witt fleet ===
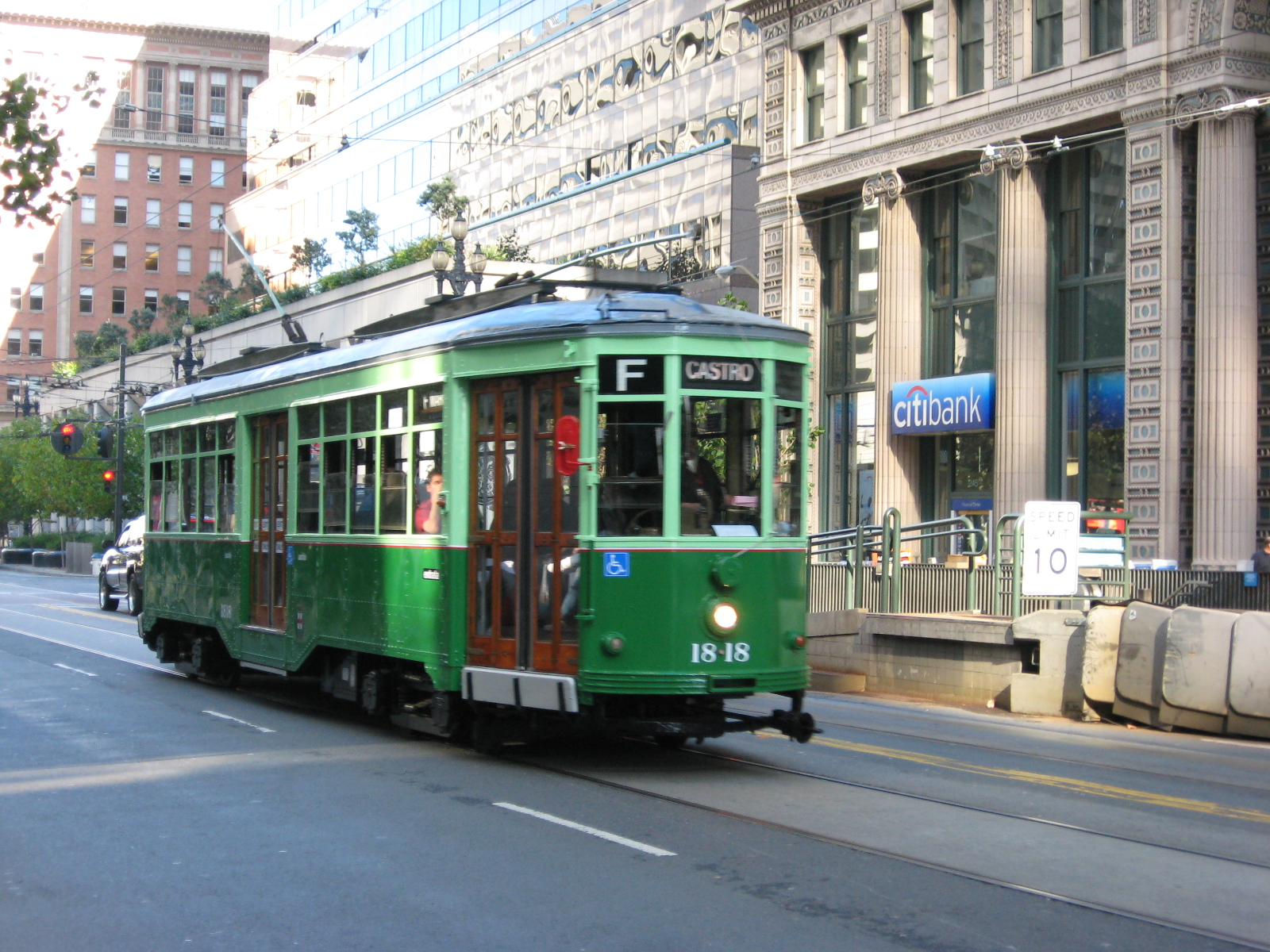
Former Milan Peter Witt car carrying the two-tone green color scheme used by Milan between 1926 and the 1970s.

Muni operates a fleet of Peter Witt streetcars on the line, acquired from Milan, Italy. There are 11 of these cars, all built in 1928 to an Italian derivative of a common streetcar design that operated in many US cities, although never previously in San Francisco.

Most of San Francisco's Peter Witt cars are currently painted in the overall orange color scheme that they carried in Milan, although one has been repainted into its original livery of yellow and white with black trim, while another is in the two-tone green livery that the cars carried from the 1930s to the 1970s.

=== San Francisco vintage fleet ===
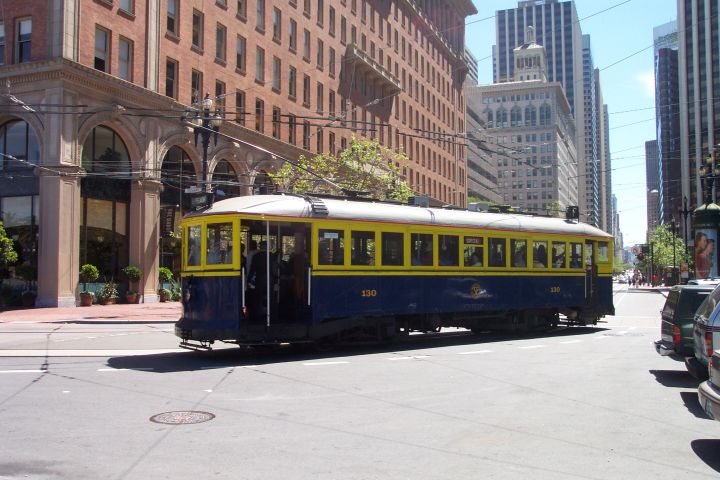
Veteran San Francisco streetcar 130 was built for Muni in 1914, and operates in the livery it carried in 1939.

The F-Line fleet also includes a fleet of pre-PCC vintage cars built between 1895 and 1924 for use in San Francisco. Three passenger cars were built for Muni itself, and a further two for the independent Market Street Railway Company that ran competing streetcar services in San Francisco until acquired by Muni in 1944. The final car is a works flat car, built for Muni in 1916 and used for hauling rails, ties, and other materials needed to maintain a streetcar system.

The cars carry a variety of former San Francisco streetcar color schemes.

=== Worldwide fleet ===
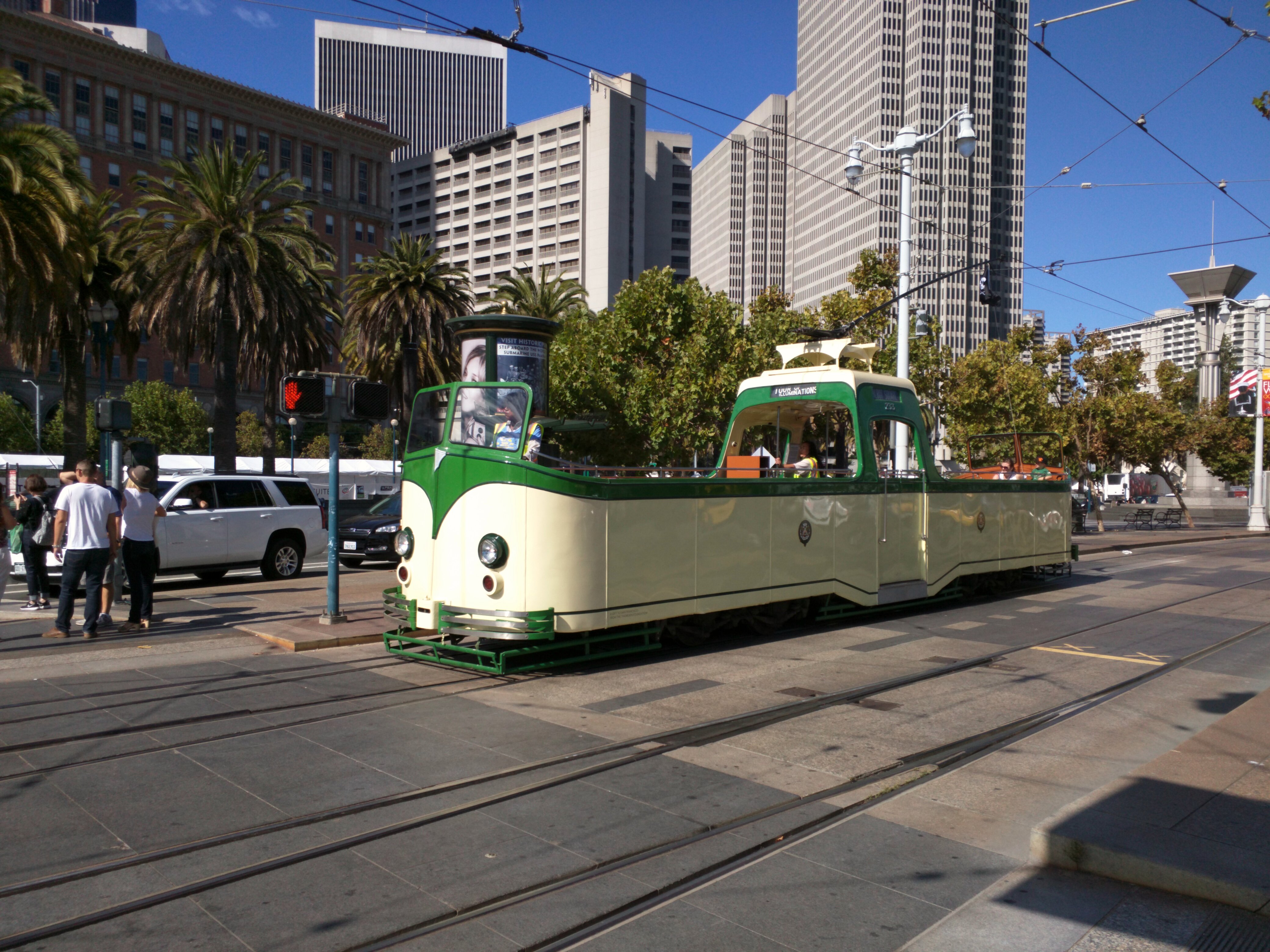
"Boat tram" #233 from Blackpool

The Muni's international fleet on the F-Line includes a diverse collection of 10 cars from various operators worldwide:

- Blackpool tramway, in Blackpool, England (including two distinctive open-air boat cars)
- The former Hamburg tram system, in Hamburg, Germany
- Hankai Tramway, in Osaka, Japan
- Kobe Municipal Transportation Bureau & Hiroshima Electric Railway, in Kobe & Hiroshima, Japan
- Melbourne & Metropolitan Tramways Board, in Melbourne, Australia
- Moscow tram system, in Moscow, Russia (5 ft or 1,524 mm system)
- Porto tram system, in Porto, Portugal
- STIB/MIVB, in Brussels, Belgium.

All the cars carry the color schemes of their original operators, except for the Brussels car, which currently carries a color scheme paying tribute to San Francisco's twin city of Zürich in Switzerland (the streetcars actually in use in Zürich use meter-gauge and therefore cannot be moved to San Francisco). The Moscow trams had to be equipped with 4 ft 8 1/2 in (1,435 mm) trucks.

== Stop listing ==
Stop		Neighborhood	Connections and Notes
Inbound	Outbound	Neighborhood	Connections and Notes
Jones and Beach		Fisherman's Wharf	Powell-Hyde
Jefferson and Taylor	Beach and Mason	Fisherman's Wharf	Powell-Mason; Blue and Gold Fleet, San Francisco Bay Ferry (at Pier 41); Muni: 28, 39; Golden Gate Transit: 132, 154, 172
Jefferson and Powell	Beach and Mason	Fisherman's Wharf	Powell-Mason; Blue and Gold Fleet, San Francisco Bay Ferry (at Pier 41); Muni: 28, 39; Golden Gate Transit: 132, 154, 172
The Embarcadero and Stockton	Beach and Stockton	Fisherman's Wharf	Muni: 39; Serves Pier 39
Inbound splits from The Embarcadero towards Jefferson Street; outbound joins The Embarcadero from Beach Street
The Embarcadero and Bay			Alcatraz Cruises (at Pier 33); Muni: 8, 8BX; Golden Gate Transit: 132, 154, 172; Serves Pier 35
The Embarcadero and Sansome			
The Embarcadero and Greenwich			Muni: 82X
The Embarcadero and Green			Serves Exploratorium
The Embarcadero and Broadway			
The Embarcadero and Washington			
Ferry Building		Financial District	Golden Gate Ferry, San Francisco Bay Ferry, Treasure Island Ferry (at Ferry Building); SamTrans; SolTrans: 82
Don Chee Way and Steuart		Financial District	Serves the San Francisco Railway Museum.; Muni: 2, 6, 7X, 9, 14, 14X, 21, 31
Market and Main	Market and Drumm	Financial District	Bay Area Rapid Transit at Embarcadero; at Embarcadero; California St.; Muni: 12, 41, 82X; Amtrak Thruway, Golden Gate Transit, Presidio Go Shuttle, SamTrans
Market and 1st Street	Market and Battery	Financial District	AC Transit, Golden Gate Transit, Muni, SamTrans
Market and 2nd Street	Market and New Montgomery	Financial District	Bay Area Rapid Transit at Montgomery Street; at Montgomery Street; AC Transit, Golden Gate Transit, Muni, SamTrans
Market and 3rd Street	Market and Kearny	Financial District	AC Transit, Golden Gate Transit, Muni, SamTrans
Market and 4th Street	Market and Stockton	Financial District	Bay Area Rapid Transit at Powell Street; at Powell Street; at Union Square/Market Street; Powell-Hyde, Powell-Mason; AC Transit, Golden Gate Transit, Muni, SamTrans
Market and 5th Street		Financial District	Bay Area Rapid Transit at Powell Street; at Powell Street; at Union Square/Market Street; Powell-Hyde, Powell-Mason; AC Transit, Golden Gate Transit, Muni, SamTrans
Market and 6th Street	Market and Taylor	Civic Center, Tenderloin	AC Transit, Golden Gate Transit, Muni, SamTrans
Market and 7th Street	Market and 7th Street	Civic Center, Tenderloin	Bay Area Rapid Transit at Civic Center; at Civic Center/UN Plaza; AC Transit, Golden Gate Transit, Muni, SamTrans
Market and 8th Street	Market and Hyde	Civic Center, Tenderloin	Bay Area Rapid Transit at Civic Center; at Civic Center/UN Plaza; AC Transit, Golden Gate Transit, Muni, SamTrans
Market and 9th Street	Market and Larkin	Civic Center, Tenderloin	Muni: 6, 7, 9, 9R, 19, 21, 83X, AC Transit, SamTrams
Market and Van Ness		Civic Center, Tenderloin	at Van Ness; Muni: 6, 7, 9, 9R, Van Ness BRT (47, 49, 79X); Regional bus services: AC Transit, SamTrans
Market and Gough		Hayes Valley	AC Transit: 800; Muni: 6, 7
Market and Guerrero	Market and Laguna	Hayes Valley	
Market and Dolores	Market and Buchanan	Duboce Triangle	
Market and Church		Duboce Triangle	(surface) at Church; Muni: 22, 37
Market and Sanchez		The Castro	Muni: 37
Market and Noe		The Castro	Muni: 37
17th Street and Castro		The Castro	at Castro; Muni: 24, 35, 37

== See also ==
- List of heritage railroads in California
- San Francisco Municipal Railway fleet
