= Beach and Mason station =

Streetcar stop in San Francisco, California

Mason & Beach
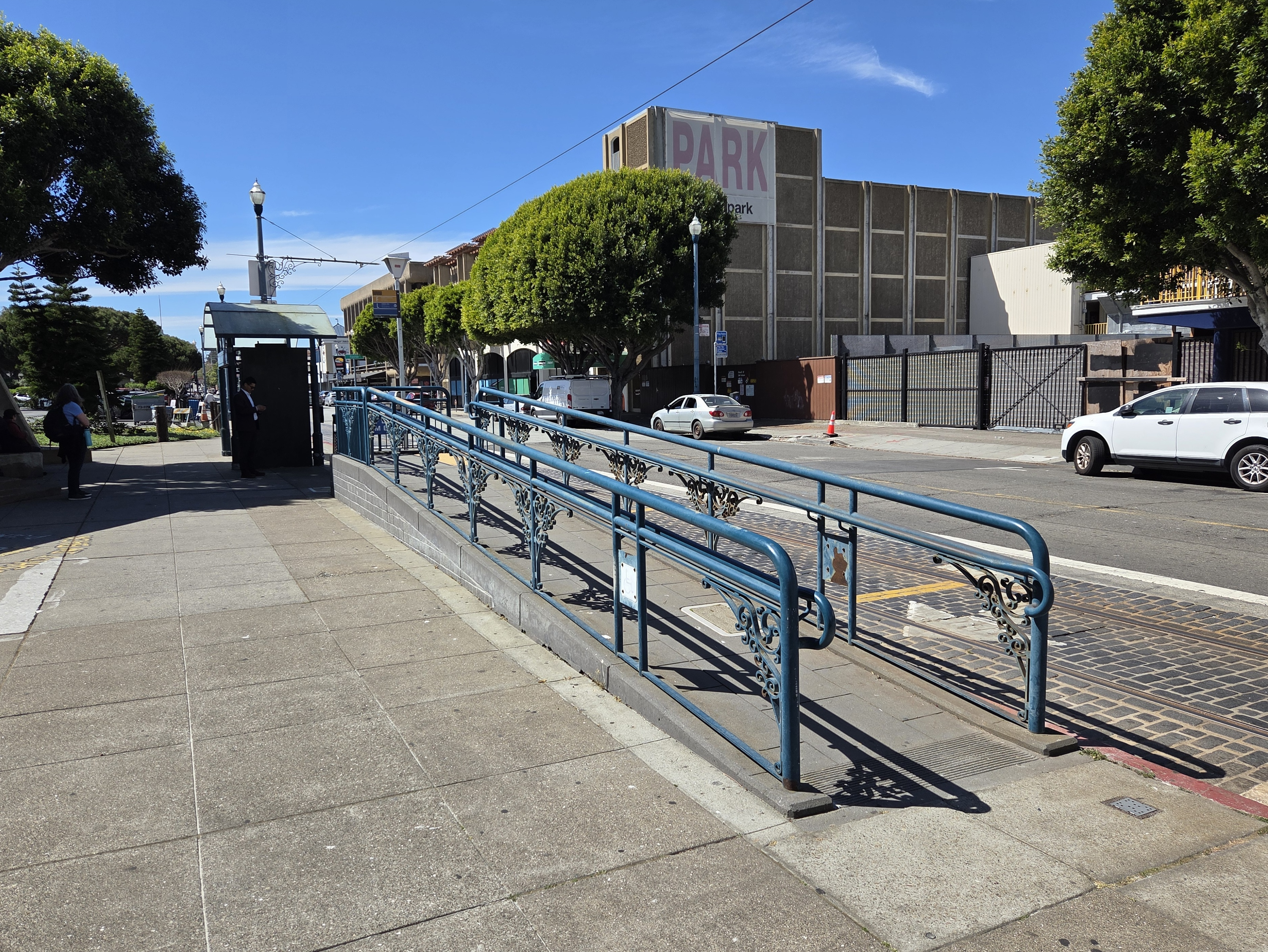
- The station platform in 2026

General information
- Location: Beach Street at Mason Street; San Francisco, California
- Coordinates: 37°48′27″N 122°24′52″W
- Platforms: 1 side platform
- Tracks: 1
- Connections: Muni: 39, 47; Powell–Mason

Construction
- Accessible: Yes

History
- Opened: March 4, 2000

Services
Preceding station	Muni	Following station
Jones and Beach One-way operation	F Market & Wharves	Beach and Stockton toward 17th Street and Castro
Former services
Preceding station	Muni	Following station
Jones and Beach One-way operation	E Embarcadero	Beach and Stockton toward 4th and King
Location

Beach and Mason station is a streetcar station in San Francisco, California, serving the San Francisco Municipal Railway's F Market & Wharves historic streetcar line. It is located on Beach Street at Mason Street. The station opened on March 4, 2000, with the streetcar's extension to Fisherman's Wharf.

Beach and Mason station is about 0.2 miles (0.32 km) from the terminus of the Powell–Mason cable car. The stop is also served by the route 47 bus, plus the L Owl bus route, which provides service along the F Market & Wharves and L Taraval lines during the late night hours when trains do not operate.
