= Jefferson and Taylor station =

Jefferson & Taylor
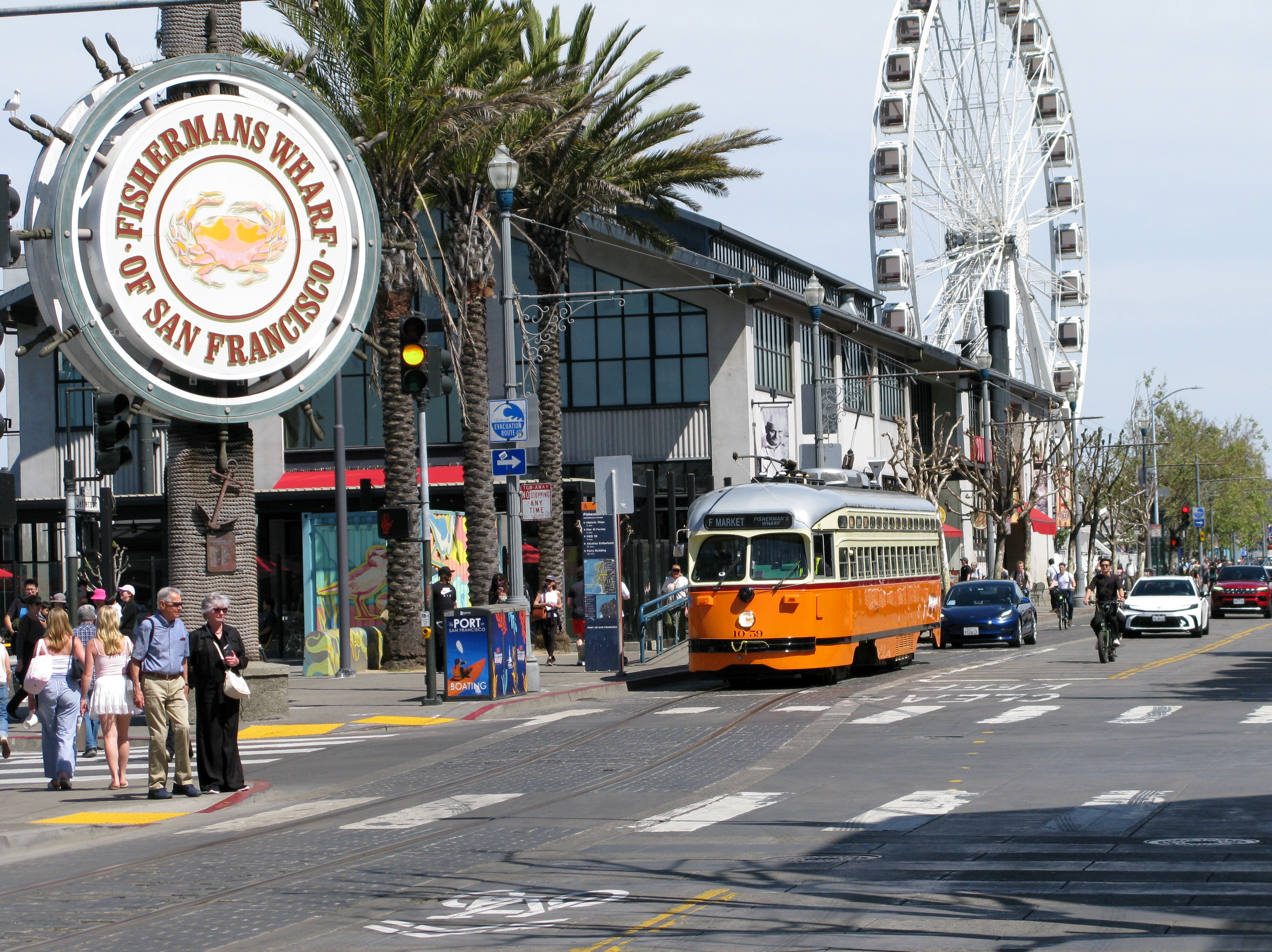
- A streetcar at Jefferson and Taylor in 2026

General information
- Location: Jefferson Street at Taylor Street; San Francisco, California
- Coordinates: 37°48′30″N 122°24′56″W
- Platforms: 1 side platform
- Tracks: 1
- Connections: Muni: 39

Construction
- Accessible: Yes

History
- Opened: March 4, 2000

Services
Preceding station	Muni	Following station
Jones and Beach Terminus	F Market & Wharves	Jefferson and Powell One-way operation
Former services
Preceding station	Muni	Following station
Jones and Beach Terminus	E Embarcadero	Jefferson and Powell One-way operation
Location

Jefferson and Taylor station is a streetcar station in the Fisherman's Wharf district of San Francisco, California, serving the San Francisco Municipal Railway's F Market & Wharves historic streetcar line. It is located on Jefferson Street at Taylor Street. The station opened on March 4, 2000, with the streetcar's extension to Fisherman's Wharf.

The stop is served by the L Owl bus route, which provides service along the F Market & Wharves and L Taraval lines during the late night hours when trains do not operate.
