= Beach and Stockton station =

Streetcar station in San Francisco

Stockton & Beach
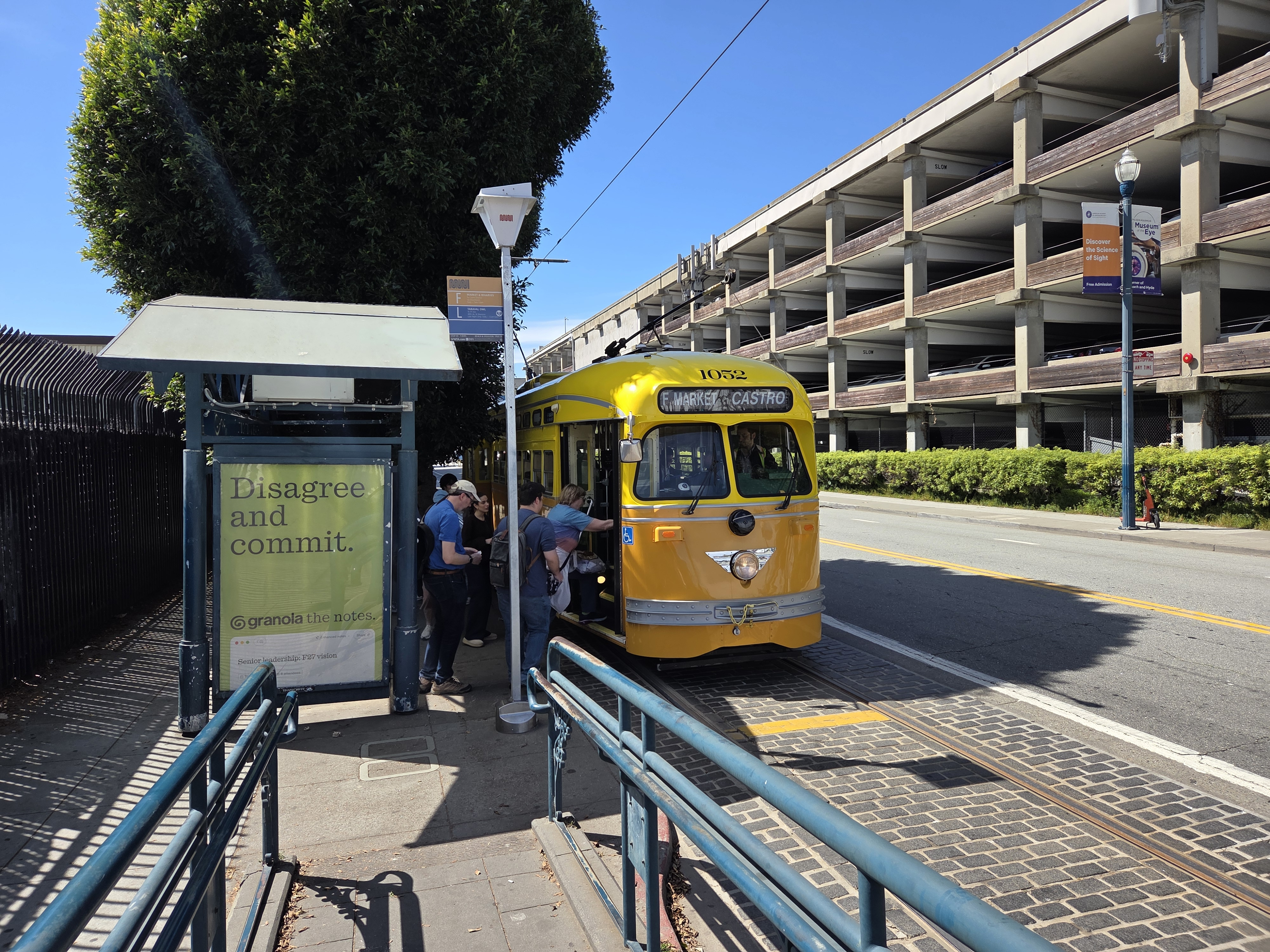
- A streetcar at Beach and Stockton in 2026

General information
- Location: Beach Street at Stockton Street; San Francisco, California
- Coordinates: 37°48′28″N 122°24′40″W
- Platforms: 1 side platform
- Tracks: 1
- Connections: Muni: 39

Construction
- Accessible: Yes

History
- Opened: March 4, 2000

Services
Preceding station	Muni	Following station
Beach and Mason One-way operation	F Market & Wharves	The Embarcadero and Bay toward 17th Street and Castro
Former services
Preceding station	Muni	Following station
Beach and Mason One-way operation	E Embarcadero	The Embarcadero and Bay toward 4th and King
Location

Beach and Stockton station is a streetcar station in San Francisco, California, serving the San Francisco Municipal Railway's F Market & Wharves historic streetcar line. It is located on Beach Street at Stockton Street, near the Pier 39 shopping center and tourist attraction. The station opened on March 4, 2000, with the streetcar's extension to Fisherman's Wharf.

The stop is served by the L Owl bus route, which provides service along the F Market & Wharves and L Taraval lines during the late night hours when trains do not operate.
