= Jones and Beach station =

Streetcar stop in San Francisco, California

Beach & Jones
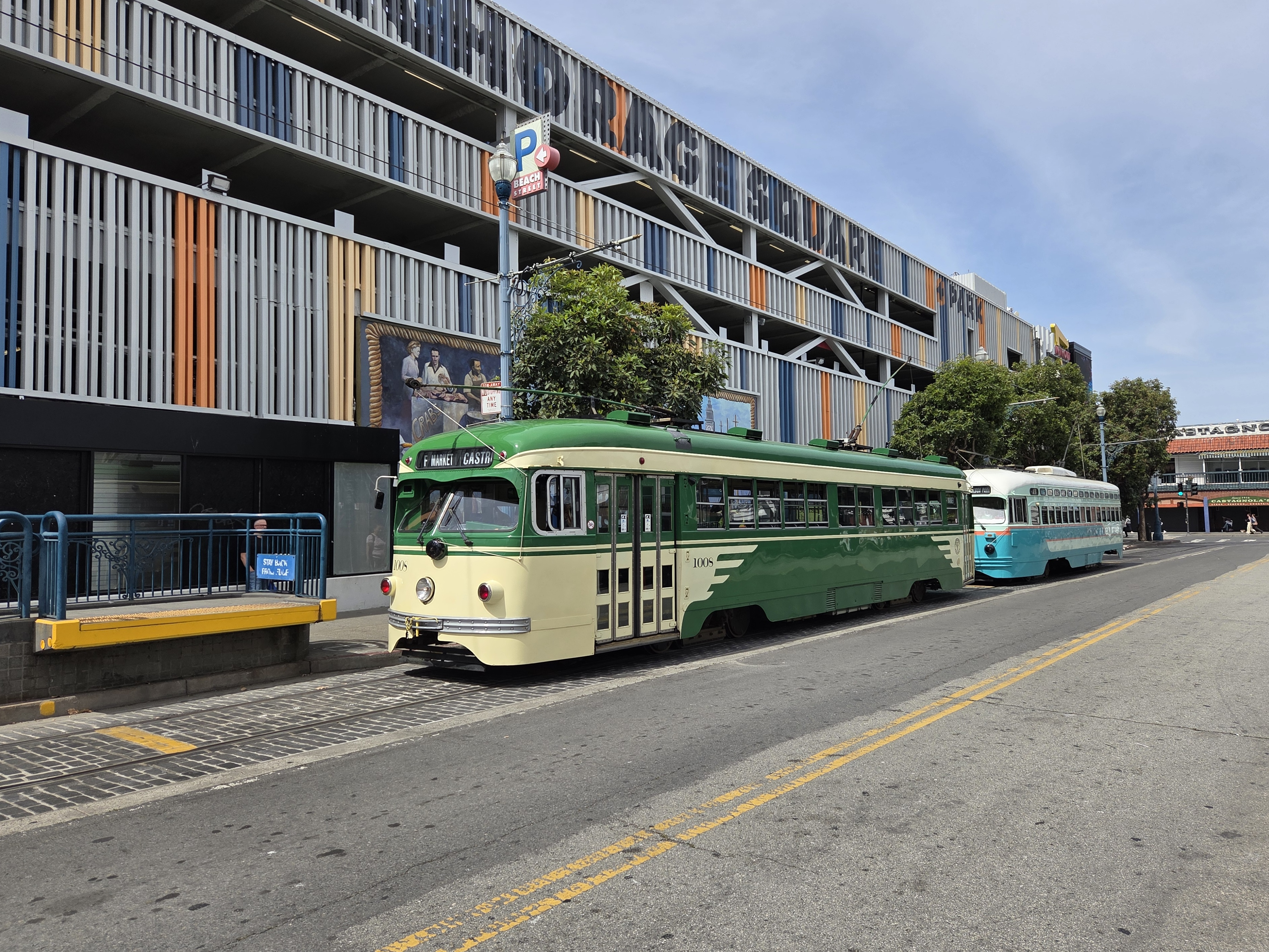
- Streetcars at Jones and Beach in 2026

General information
- Location: Jones Street at Beach Street; San Francisco, California
- Coordinates: 37°48′26.07″N 122°25′2.5″W
- Platforms: 1 side platform
- Tracks: 1
- Connections: Powell–Hyde

Construction
- Accessible: Yes

History
- Opened: March 4, 2000

Services
| Preceding station | Muni | Following station |
|---|---|---|
| Jefferson and Taylor One-way operation | F Market & Wharves | Beach and Mason toward 17th Street and Castro |
Former services
| Preceding station | Muni | Following station |
|---|---|---|
| Jefferson and Taylor One-way operation | E Embarcadero Suspended | Beach and Mason toward 4th and King |
Location

Jones and Beach station is a streetcar station in the Fisherman's Wharf district of San Francisco, California, serving as the terminus of the San Francisco Municipal Railway's F Market & Wharves historic streetcar line. It is located on Jones Street between Beach and Jefferson Streets. The station opened on March 4, 2000, with the streetcar's extension to Fisherman's Wharf.

Jones and Beach station is about 0.2 miles (0.3 km) from the terminus of the Powell–Hyde cable car. The stop is served by the L Owl bus route, which provides service along the F Market & Wharves and L Taraval lines during the late night hours when trains do not operate.
