= San Francisco Ferry Building =

Ferry terminal in San Francisco, California

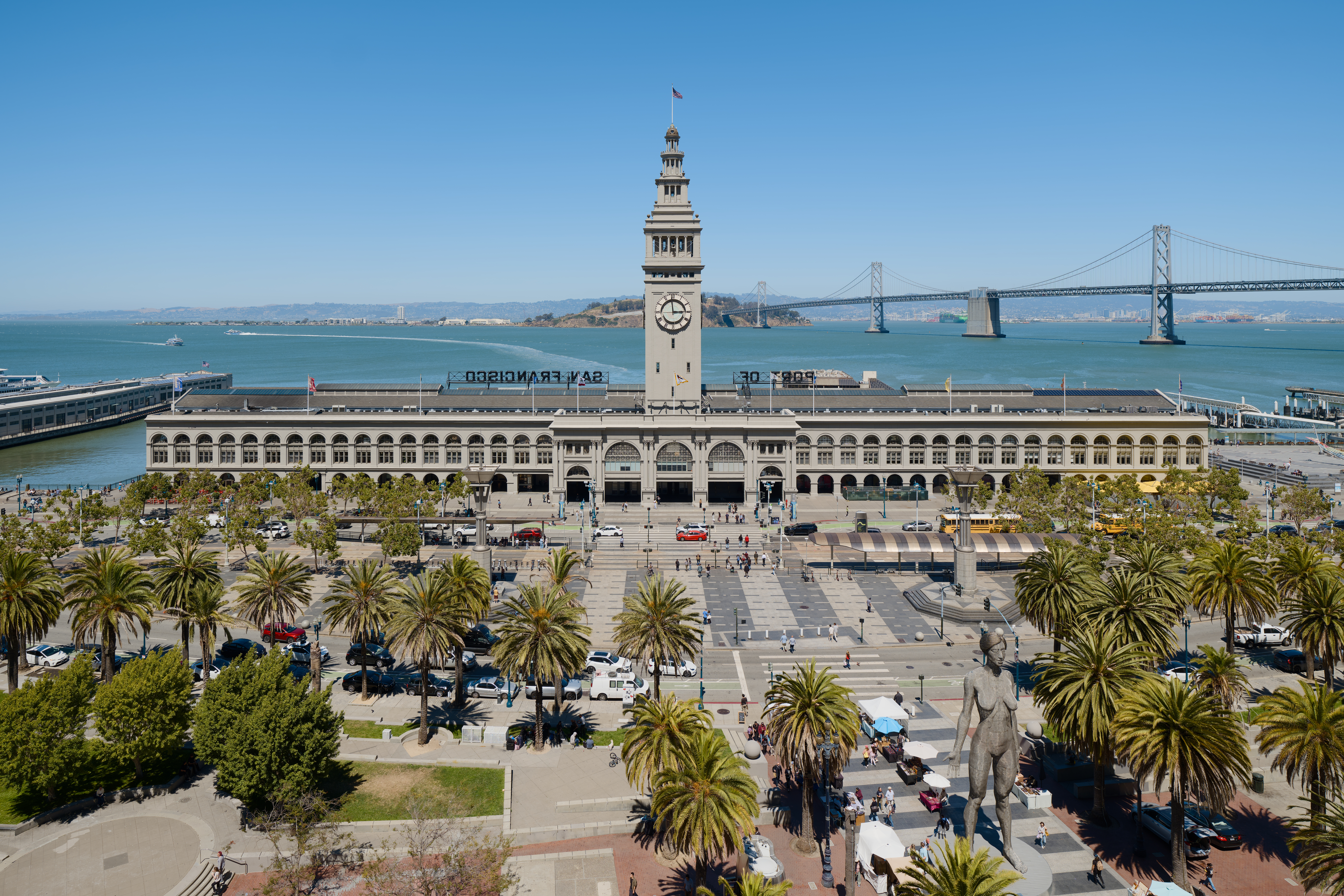
- The Ferry Building, along the Embarcadero. Treasure Island, Yerba Buena Island, and the Bay Bridge can be seen in the background, with Embarcadero Plaza and the foot of Market Street in the foreground.

General information
- Location: 1 Ferry Building; San Francisco, California
- Coordinates: 37.7955°N 122.3937°W
- Owner: Port of San Francisco
- Lines: Golden Gate Ferry; San Francisco Bay Ferry; Treasure Island Ferry
- Connections: Muni: 6, 7X, 9, 14, 14X, 21, 31; SolTrans: 82; SamTrans: EPX

Construction
- Cycle facilities: Yes
- Accessible: Yes

History
- Opened: July 13, 1898

Services
Preceding station	Muni	Following station
The Embarcadero and Washington toward Jones and Beach	F Market & Wharves	Don Chee Way and Steuart toward 17th Street and Castro
Former services
Preceding station	Muni	Following station
The Embarcadero and Washington toward Jones and Beach	E Embarcadero (2015–2020)	Brannan toward 4th and King
Market and Main toward Church and 30th Street	J Church (until 1949)	Terminus
Market and Main toward Brighton and Grafton	K Ingleside (until 1941)	Terminus
Market and Main toward SF Zoo	L Taraval (until 1948)	Terminus
Market and Main toward Broad and Plymouth	M Ocean View (until 1948)	Terminus
Market and Main toward Ocean Beach	N Judah (until 1941)	Terminus
Preceding station	Southern Pacific Railroad	Following station
Terminus	Connection to San Francisco via Ferry	Oakland Pier Terminus
Terminus	Connection to San Francisco via Ferry	Alameda Mole Terminus
Preceding station	Key System	Following station
Terminus	Connection to San Francisco via Ferry	Key System Mole Terminus
Preceding station	Northwestern Pacific Railroad	Following station
Terminus	Connection to San Francisco via Ferry	Sausalito Terminus
Preceding station	Atchison, Topeka and Santa Fe Railway	Following station
Terminus	Connection to San Francisco via Ferry	Ferry Point Terminus
- Union Ferry Depot
- U.S. National Register of Historic Places
- San Francisco Designated Landmark
- Area: 2.8 acres (1.1 ha)
- Architect: A. Page Brown
- Architectural style: Eclectic, Beaux-Arts, Classical Revival
- NRHP reference No.: 78000760
- SFDL No.: 90

Significant dates
- Added to NRHP: December 1, 1978
- Designated SFDL: 1977
Location

The San Francisco Ferry Building is a terminal for ferries that travel across San Francisco Bay, a food hall and an office building. It is located on The Embarcadero in San Francisco, California, and is served by Golden Gate Ferry and San Francisco Bay Ferry routes.

On top of the building is a 245-foot-tall (75 m) clock tower with four clock dials, each 22 feet (6.7 m) in diameter, which can be seen from Market Street, a main thoroughfare of the city.

Designed in 1892 by American architect A. Page Brown in the Beaux-Arts style, the ferry building was completed in 1898. At its opening, it was the largest project undertaken in the city up to that time. One of Brown's design inspirations for the clock tower may have been the current 16th-century iteration of the 12th-century Giralda bell tower in Seville, Spain. The entire length of the building on both frontages is based on an arched arcade.

With decreased use since the 1950s, after bridges were constructed to carry transbay traffic and most streetcar routes were converted to buses, the building was adapted to office use and its public spaces broken up. In 2002, a restoration and renovation were undertaken to redevelop the entire complex. The 660-foot-long (200 m) Great Nave was restored, together with its height and materials. A marketplace was created on the ground floor, the former baggage handling area. The second and third floors were adapted for office and Port Commission use. On every hour during daylight, the clock bell chimes portions of the Westminster Quarters. The ferry terminal is a designated San Francisco landmark and is listed on the National Register of Historic Places.

== History ==
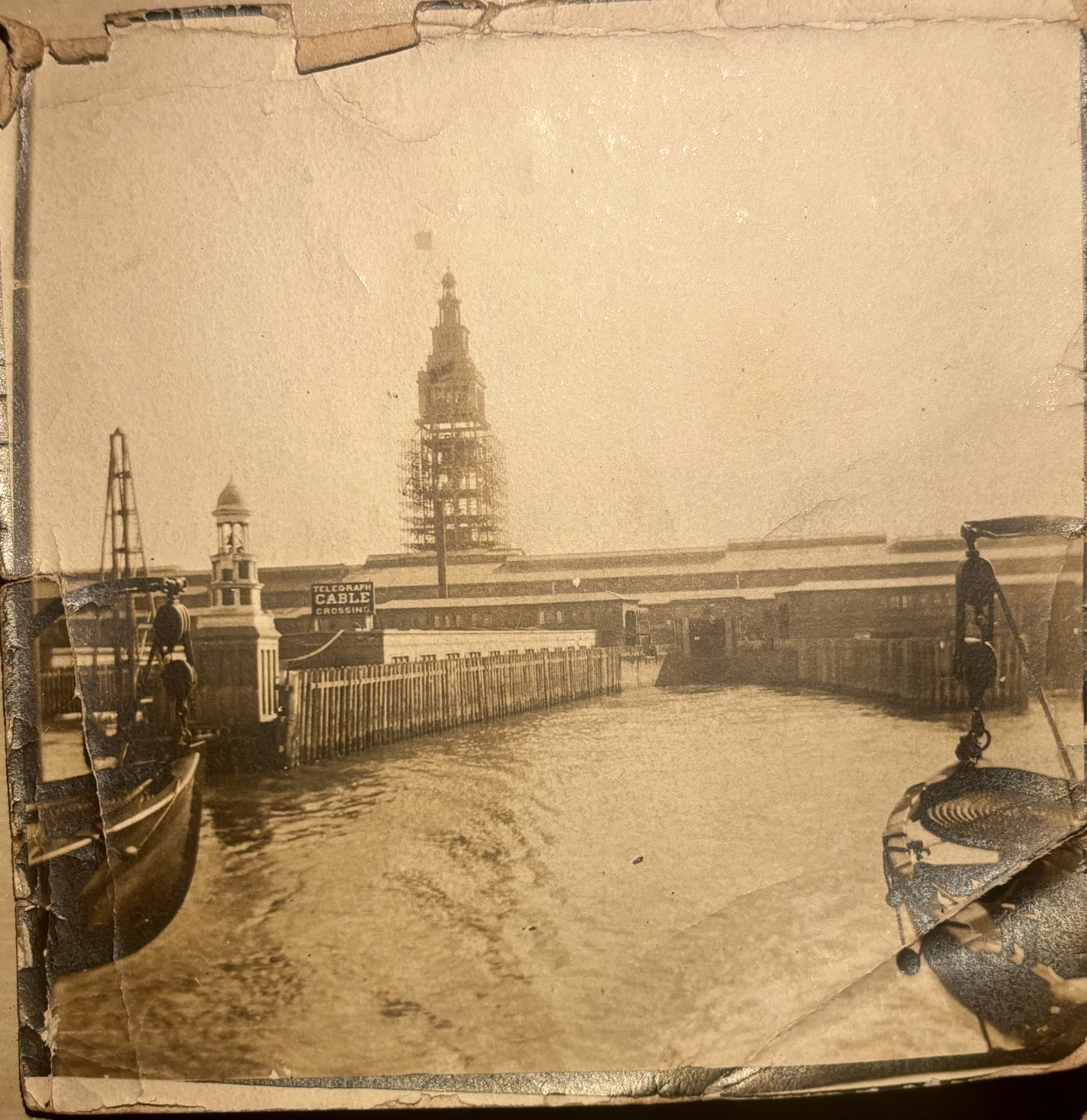
Ferry Building still under construction c. 1897.

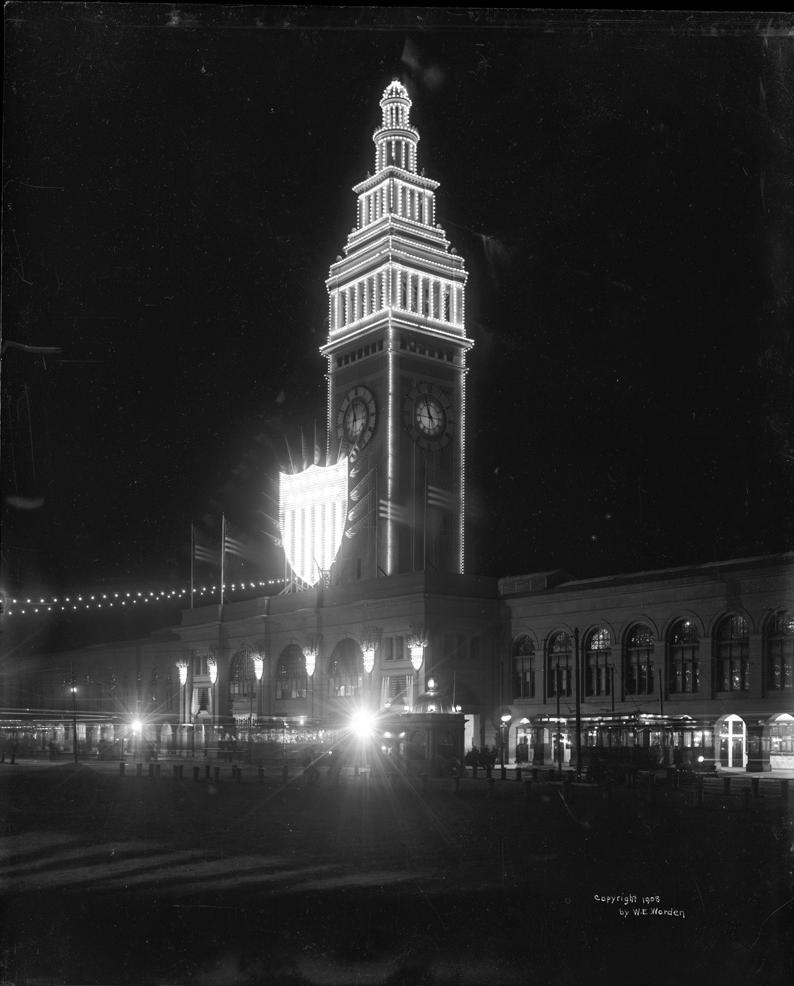
Willard Worden, Ferry Building by night, gelatin silver print, 1908.

The Ferry Building is in the center of this film from 1906.

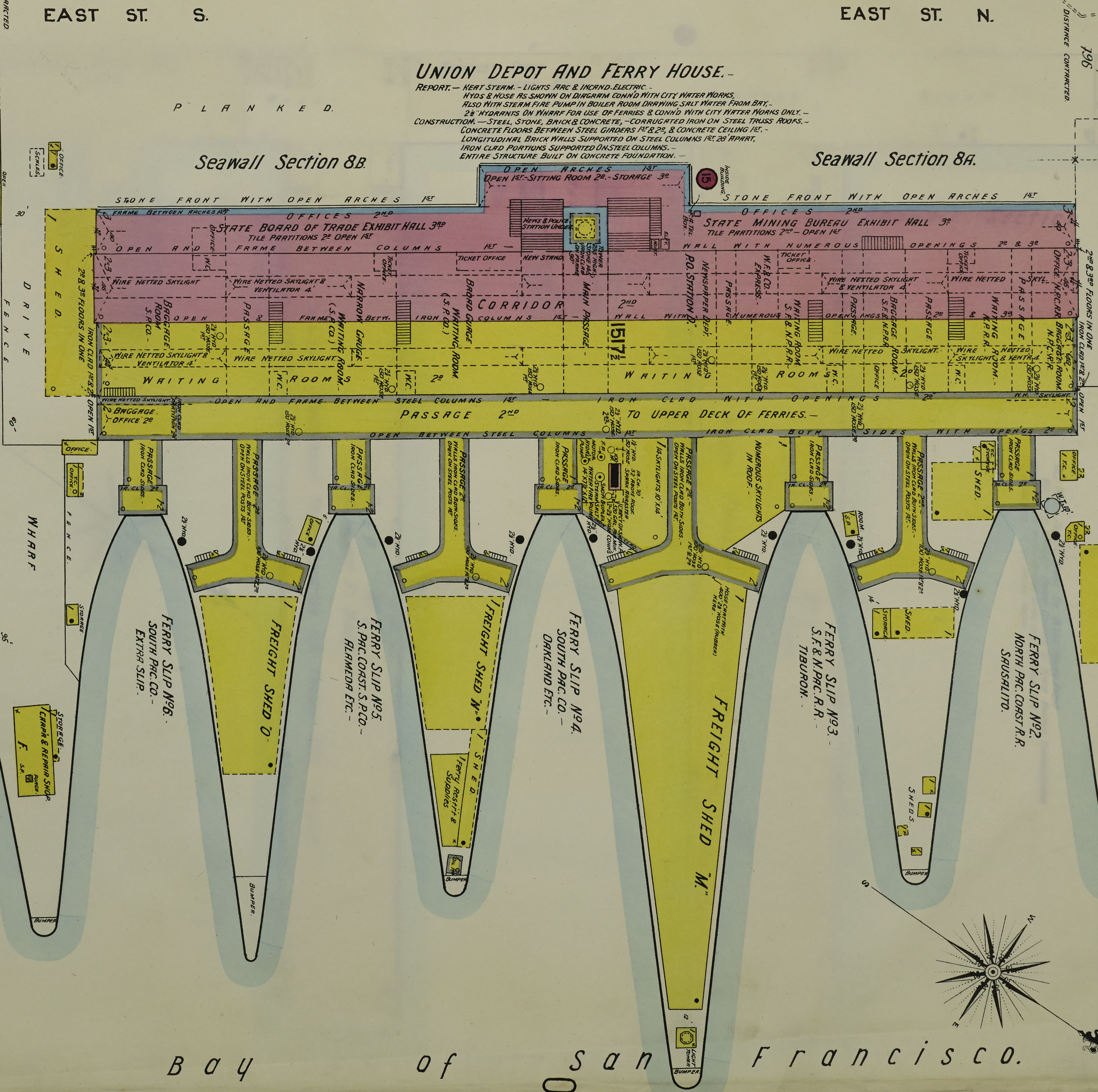
"UNION DEPOT AND FERRY HOUSE" map from 1899 Sanborn Fire Insurance map

Opened on July 13, 1898, the building replaced a wooden predecessor constructed on the same site in 1875. The well built reinforced building with its arched arcades survived both the 1906 and the 1989 earthquakes with little damage. It served as the destination for commuters to San Francisco from the East Bay, who rode the ferry fleets of the Southern Pacific and the Key System. It also served as the connection to San Francisco for the transcontinental rail lines of the Southern Pacific, Santa Fe and Western Pacific which terminated in Oakland, and for the Northwestern Pacific running north from Marin County. The ferry piers north of the clock tower served the Key System, Santa Fe, and Northwestern Pacific, while the piers south of the tower served the Southern Pacific and Western Pacific. Streetcars were initially served on Market Street with a turntable used for reversing cars. Following the 1906 earthquake, a two-track balloon loop was installed in front of the building to enable convenient transfers to streetcars. When the Twin Peaks Tunnel began carrying streetcars in 1918, a third loop was added. This layout was capable of handling up to 295 cars per hour. A large pedestrian bridge spanned the Embarcadero in front of the Ferry building to facilitate safe crossing of the busy plaza and transit hub. In the 1940s, the bridge was dismantled to supply scrap metal for the Second World War.

Until the completion of the Bay Bridge (which began to carry railroad traffic) and Golden Gate Bridge in the 1930s, the Ferry Building was the second busiest transit terminal in the world, second only to London's Charing Cross Station. After the bridges opened, and the new Key System and Southern Pacific (Interurban Electric/IER) trains began running to the East Bay from the Transbay Terminal in 1939, passenger ferry use fell sharply. In the second half of the 20th century, although the Ferry Building and its clock tower remained a part of the San Francisco skyline, the condition of the building interior declined with changes. Beginning in the 1950s, unsympathetic renovations installed a mezzanine level, broke up the grand space of the Great Nave, and partitioned the ticketing counters and waiting room areas into office space. The formerly grand public space was reduced to a narrow and dark corridor, through which travelers passed en route to the piers. Passengers were made to wait for ferries on outdoor benches, and the ticketing booths were moved to the pier.

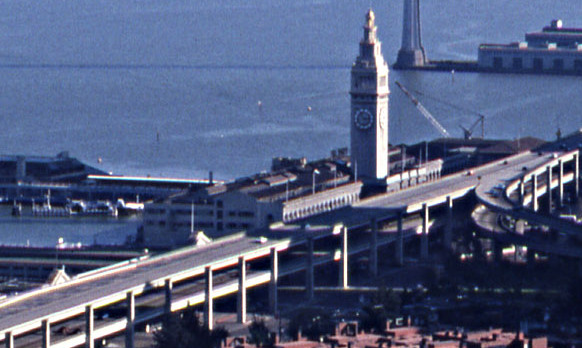
Embarcadero Freeway limiting access to the Ferry Building, February 1982

In the late 1950s, the Embarcadero Freeway was built, which passed right in front of the Ferry Building, and views of the once-prominent landmark were greatly obscured from Market Street. Pedestrian access was treated as an afterthought, and the public was cut off from the waterfront.

Market Street Railway services terminated at a loop in front of the building prior to the construction of the Transbay Terminal. The last streetcars ran on July 2, 1949.

With the structural failure of the Embarcadero Freeway during the October 1989 Loma Prieta earthquake, San Francisco was offered the choice of whether to rebuild it or remove the freeway and reconnect the city with the eastern waterfront and the historic Ferry Building. As part of the larger rejection of the 1950s comprehensive freeway plan as unsympathetic to the city's character, and the general unpopularity of the freeway, Mayor Art Agnos led the charge to remove the Embarcadero freeway entirely. It was replaced with a ground-level boulevard, which reconnected a significant portion of San Francisco's waterfront and the rest of the city. Access was restored to Embarcadero Plaza (previously Justin Herman Plaza) and the foot of Market Street, of which the Ferry Building had been an integral part for so many decades.

=== Renovations ===
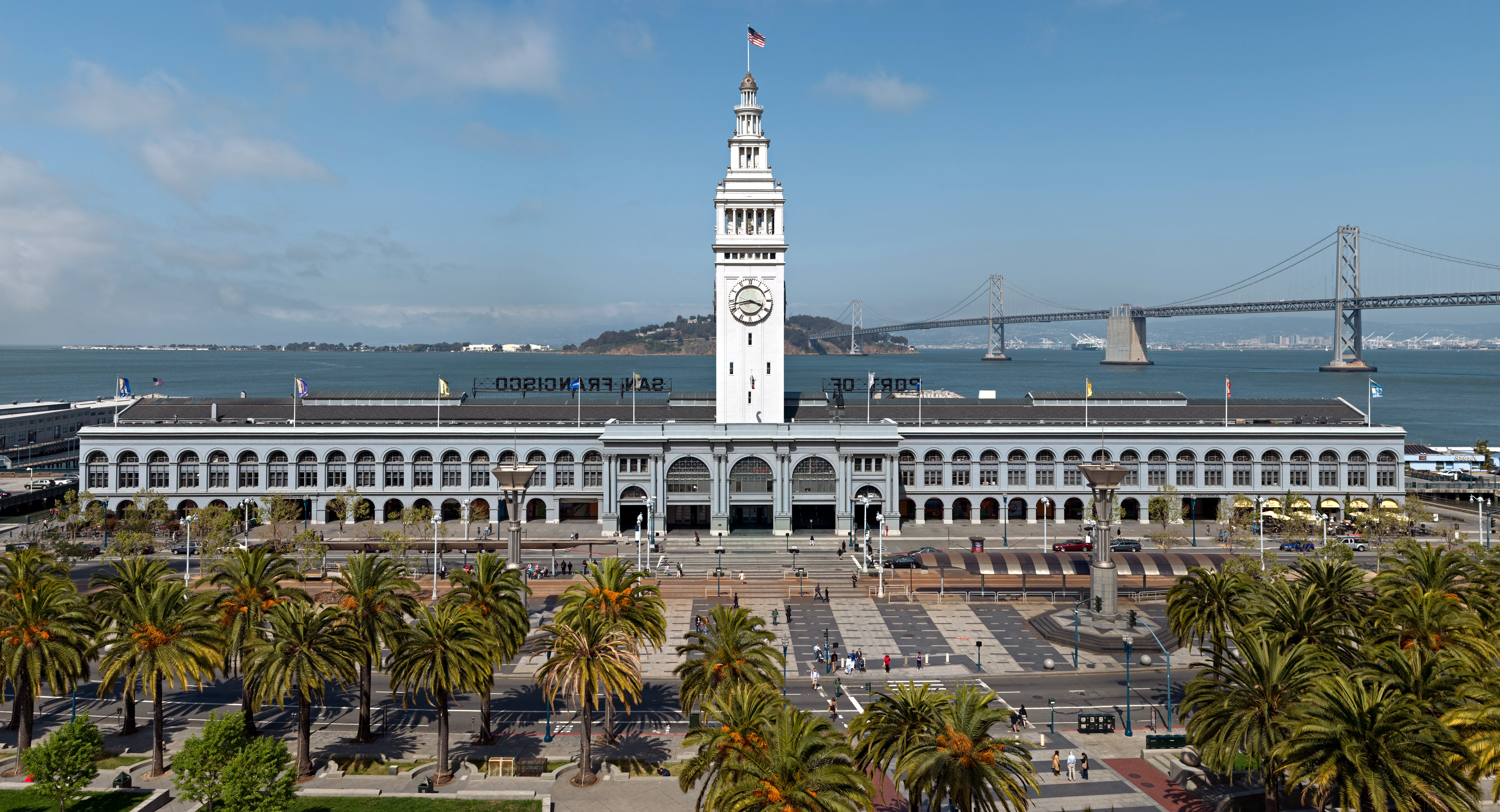
The Ferry Building in 2008

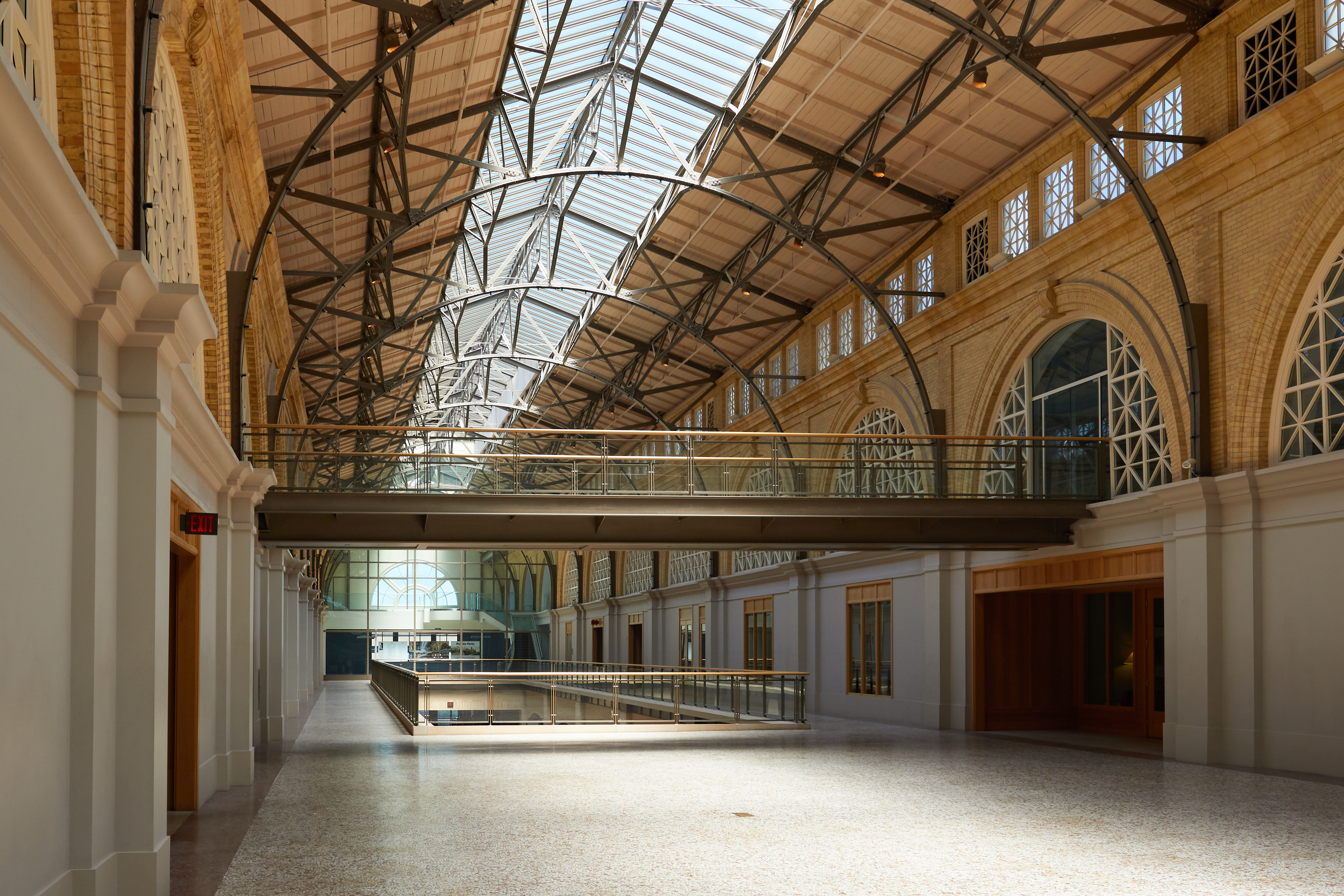
"Great Nave" of the Ferry Building after its renovations

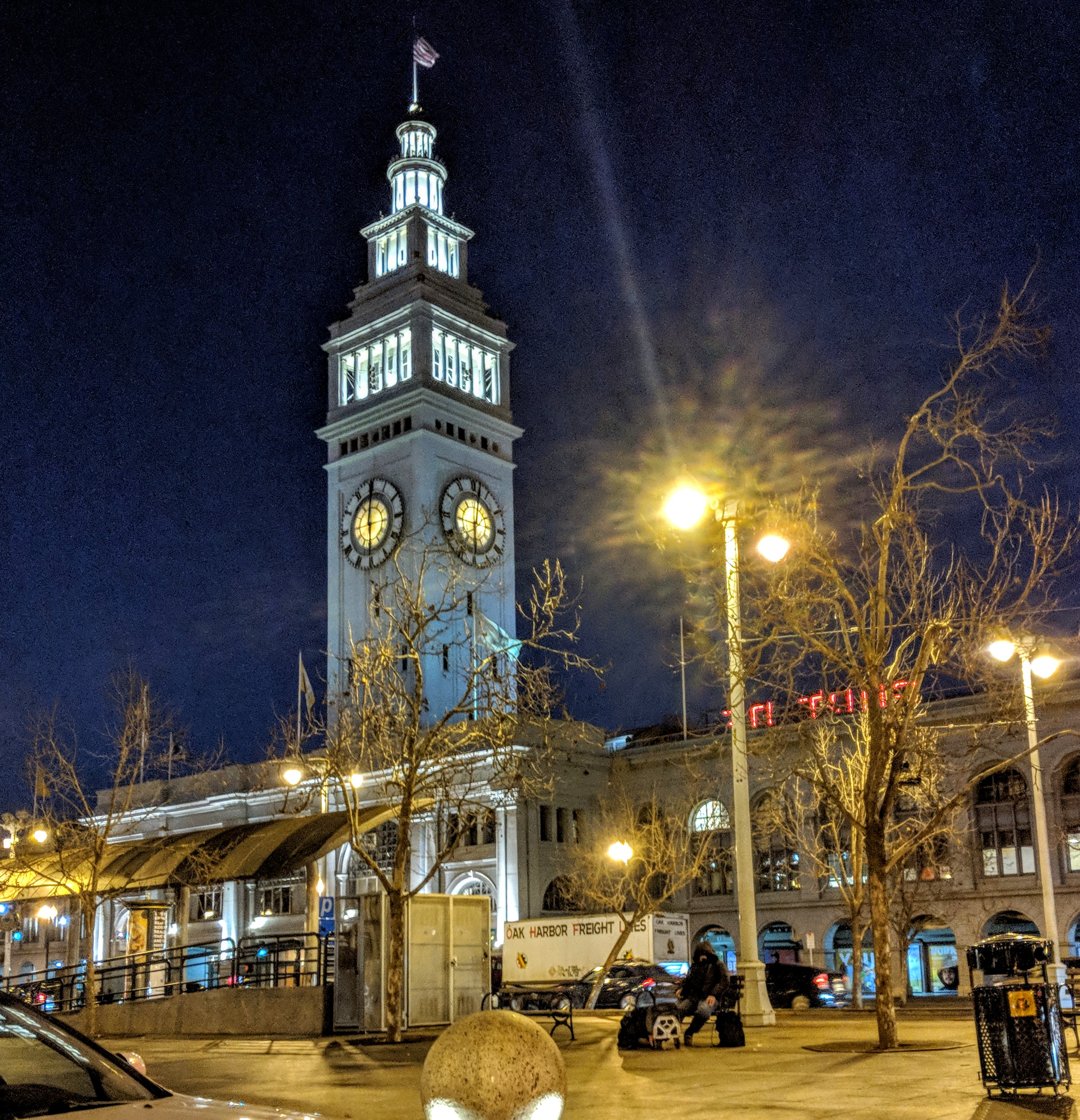
The Ferry Building at night in 2019

By 1992, the freeway had been removed and San Francisco began to create a comprehensive port development plan that would revitalize the newly cleared space, create public access, and reintroduce the ferry service. As the most iconic element of the waterfront, the Ferry Building was central to the aesthetic and the overall success of the development plan, and its status as a historic landmark for both architecture and engineering made a sympathetic restoration essential. The 1898 Ferry Building was a symbol of San Francisco's history as a bustling port city, but with the redevelopment plan, the city was choosing to also make the structure a symbol of San Francisco's future.

The vastness of the project resulted in the selection of a group of firms that could each focus on a key aspect of the redevelopment plan. ROMA Design Group—site design architects—designed the bayside and cityside promenades and plazas and reoriented the public spaces of the area to the building and to the bay. ROMA Design Group also designed new ferry terminals and the main historic streetcar stop that re-established the area as a multi-modal transit hub and gateway into the city. Simon Martin-Vegue Winkelstein Moris Architects (SMWM), founded by Cathy Simon, created an overall plan for the building; Baldauf Catton Von Eckartsberg Architects (BCVE) examined and planned for the needs of new retail spaces; Page & Turnbull, specialists in historic preservation, dealt with the restoration, replacement, and recreation of the historic elements of the structure.

Although the project was a restoration project, the structure would not be returned to its pure historic use as a nexus of bay transit. While the demand for ferry transit has experienced increasing demand in recent years by cross-bay commuters, the ferry service will never again reach historic levels. Therefore, in order to draw visitors, the Ferry Building has been transformed into a retail and restaurant space on the ground floor that focuses on local, sustainable products. The Port and the project developers believed that the combination of transit, office use, and unique retail would make the Ferry Building a destination for locals and tourists alike that would drive the greater goal of stimulating the waterfront.

The focus on creating a viable economic use for the Ferry Building was fundamental in developing the final restoration plan and while important historic features that are key to the structure's integrity were largely restored, some adaptations were allowed more license to meet the needs of the reuse proposal. The restored Ferry Building was opened in 2003. The lead developer was EQ Office. EQ Office was acquired by The Blackstone Group in 2007.

The ground floor of the building is occupied by a marketplace featuring about 50 restaurants, retail shops and food purveyors, most of which are open seven days a week. An outdoor farmers' market operates on the surrounding plaza. As of October 9, 2020, the San Francisco online, community radio station BFF.fm broadcasts live from the Ferry Building.

== Architecture and design ==
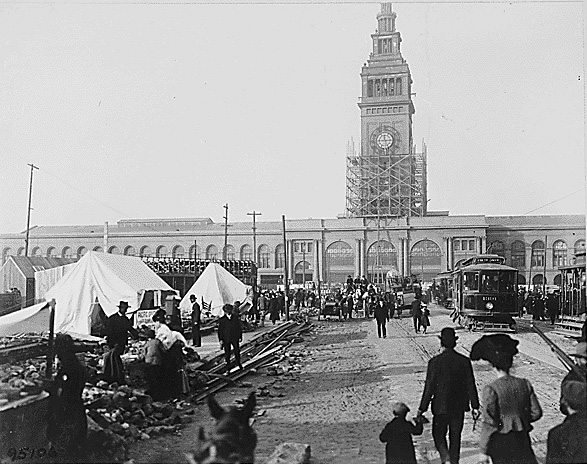
The Ferry Building after the 1906 earthquake

The present structure was designed in 1892 by A. Page Brown, a New York architect who had started with McKim, Mead & White, was influenced by studies at the École des Beaux-Arts in Paris, and later moved to California.

Brown designed the building to satisfy needs of an industrial society but in the high style associated with traditional buildings. The entire base is an arched arcade reminiscent of European buildings. The highest quality materials were used, such as marble and mosaics for the state seal. The 660-foot-long (200 m) Great Nave on the second floor was the major public space for arriving and departing ferry passengers.

It long has been asserted that Brown based his design of the clock tower on the current 16th-century iteration of the 12th-century Giralda bell tower in Seville, Spain. Although there are certain echoes of the Giralda in the Ferry tower, there appears to be no evidence to substantiate the claim that Brown used the Giralda as his prototype.

=== Grand Nave ===
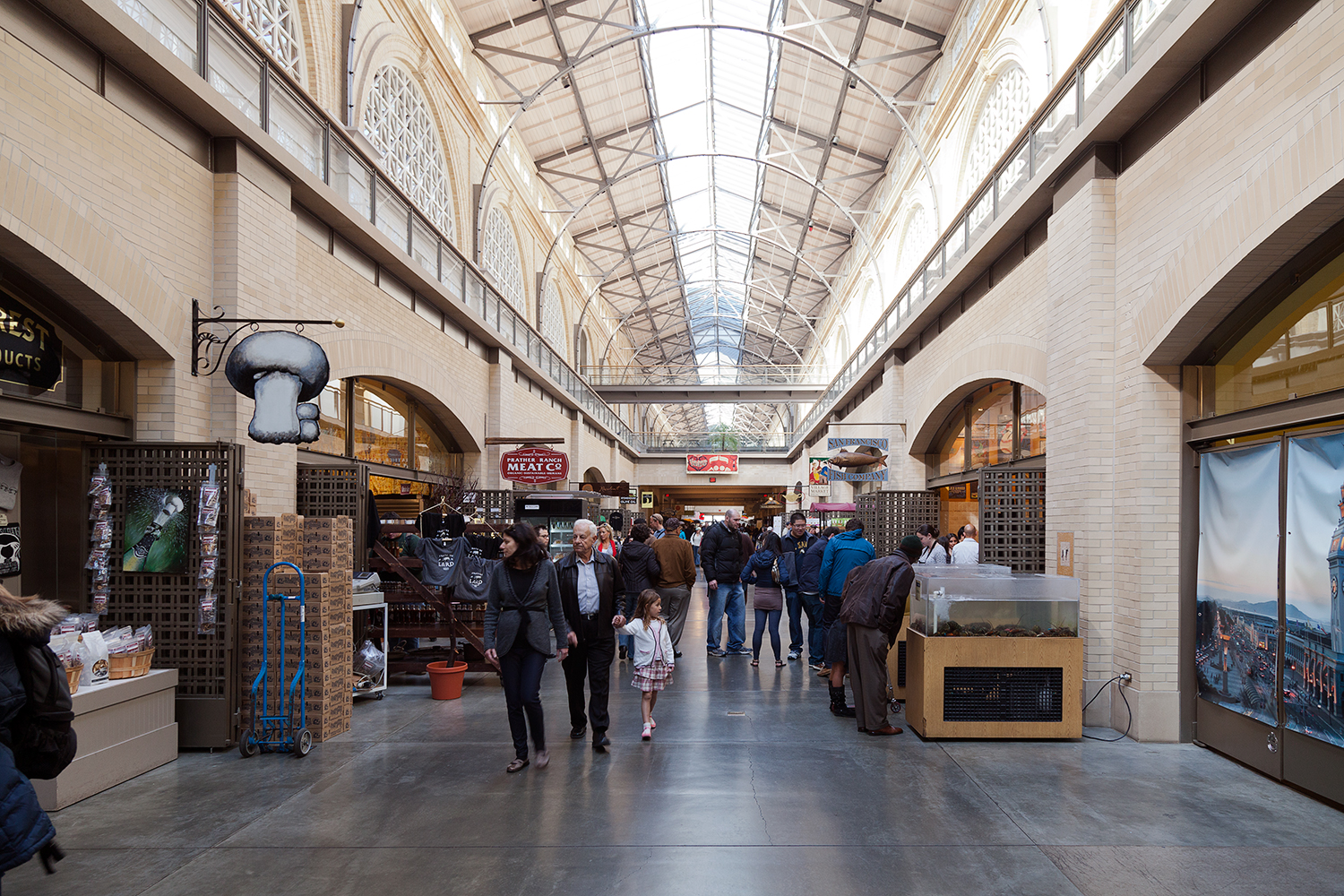
Ferry Building Marketplace

The original description of the Ferry Building as published in the Board of Harbor Commissioners' Biennial Report (1888) specified that "Passengers should pass from the upper decks of the ferries through the second story, with a bridge over the crowded and dangerous portion of East [now Embarcadero] Street." The first floor was not intended for public viewing or access and was filled with the movement of baggage, mail, and freight. Instead, the public was meant to enter the structure from an elevated walkway and move through the more refined spaces of the second floor lit by the nave. By 1992, the nave had been turned into private offices and the loss of the foot bridge meant that all public approach to the building would be at street level, altering the way in which the building was understood and experienced.

With the restoration however, the developers argued that the public's historic interaction with the space was defined by the natural light cascading from the nave, not by the elevated entry way. With the movement of the primary public space to the first floor, it became essential to their proposal that this historic experience would be recreated. Beyond removing an added third floor and restoring the 660-foot-long (200 m) nave to its two-story height, the proposal included cutting two openings, each at 33 by 150 feet (10 by 46 m), into the floor of the second level. These openings would allow for this historic feature to be extended to the visitor's experience of the first floor. This was a controversial choice, and due to the building's historic status, the proposal had to be approved by the State Historic Preservation Office (SHPO); this was the subject of multiple hearings.

=== Marble mosaics ===
The greatest debate raised by the opening of the second floor cuts, however, surrounded the treatment of the historic mosaic tiling of the second floor. The second floor Grand Nave was tiled with a mosaic marble floor of white and gray tesserae with a border of red and purple. In the center of the space at the top of the main stairway is a reproduction of the Great Seal of the State of California worked entirely in mosaics. At the time of the restoration, this surface was primarily covered with linoleum, and some small sections had been lost to prior alterations. This feature was considered integral to the historic character of the building, and as a primary public space, the tiling was a key component of community memory.

In allowing the amplification of one feature (the nave), the loss of another (the mosaics) was inherently tied. The final agreement reached between the SHPO and the development team found that as long as the important decorative portions of the flooring were restored and extra tesserae would be used to repair damaged sections, the cuts would be approved.

In order to restore the mosaic, the applied linoleum surface had to be carefully peeled away and a mixture of crushed walnut shells was then used to clean the marble surface without damaging the material.

=== Arch reproduction and patinization ===
In the process of removing of the 1947 and 1950 third-floor additions, Page & Turnbull discovered the extent of the damage to the brick and terra cotta arches of the nave. Twenty-two arches span the length of the nave on each side, and of the 44 total, 11 had been destroyed. Over 25 percent of the original material had been removed in the first remodel, including terra cotta scroll-work, the arches themselves, and sections of the surrounding brickwork. In order to restore the highly significant nave, Page & Turnbull had to design and create replacements for these 11 arches that would be accurate enough not to detract from the sight line of the second story that these arches flank.

The prohibitive cost and effort of replacing these materials in kind led to the choice of a cast-stone with fiberglass support that mimics the buff brick in both color and finish. Through the use of a cast material, Page & Turnbull was able to create a fiberglass mold to be used for casting each arch as a unit that could then be inserted into sections where original fabric had been lost. The addition of fiberglass as a support material—that allows for both flexibility and compressive strength—was seen as an added benefit in meeting concerns over the building's continued seismic safety.

Creating visual continuity between the new and the old was critical in this instance due to the significance of the long stretch of the nave; here an obvious alteration in material or color would detract from the pattern of springing arches that continues through the length of the structure. Page & Turnbull invited faux-finishing specialist Jacquelyn Giuffre to disguise the new sections and recreate the continuity of pattern and color. Guiffre's job was made more difficult by the fact that the structure had not been completely sealed against the elements during the restoration and the salts of the bay air triggered a staining process that created green marks in the yellow and buff brick. In order to match the texture and patina of the old brick, Guiffre used six different pigments applied by hand, and then applied green shading to mimic the new staining process. Once the pieces were installed, a final stage of blending was completed on site to ensure the greatest possible accuracy.

=== Clocks ===
The original clock mechanism was refurbished in 2000; it is complete and intact, despite two previous modifications. The Ferry Building has its original Special #4 clock made in 1898 by the Boston clock maker E. Howard. It was the largest wind-up, mechanical dial clock in the world but is now powered by an electric motor. The four dials are each 22 feet (6.7 m) in diameter, and a portion of the dial appears to be back-lit at night. This is the effect of two concentric dials on each clock face, in which the inner dial is lit and visible at night.

Although the hands and a small portion of the works are now powered by an electric motor, the entire clock mechanism is still there. The huge weight hangs in its 48-foot (15 m) shaft; once wound, it formerly kept the clock running for eight days. The 16-foot (4.9 m) pendulum also remains, but it is motionless, replaced by electric power.

There was a set of electronic loudspeakers above the clock that played Westminster Chimes on the hour and made a loud siren noise every Tuesday at noon on the hour until their removal in 2024 due to issues with the city's siren system. These speakers replaced a 30-horsepower "Instant Blast" mechanical siren built by local company Heath Engineering Laboratories which was installed in 1918. The siren saw daily use at noon until it was shut off in 1972 due to noise complaints and mechanical failure. The siren was destroyed during restoration of the building in 2001; its remains were preserved at the San Francisco National Maritime Museum.

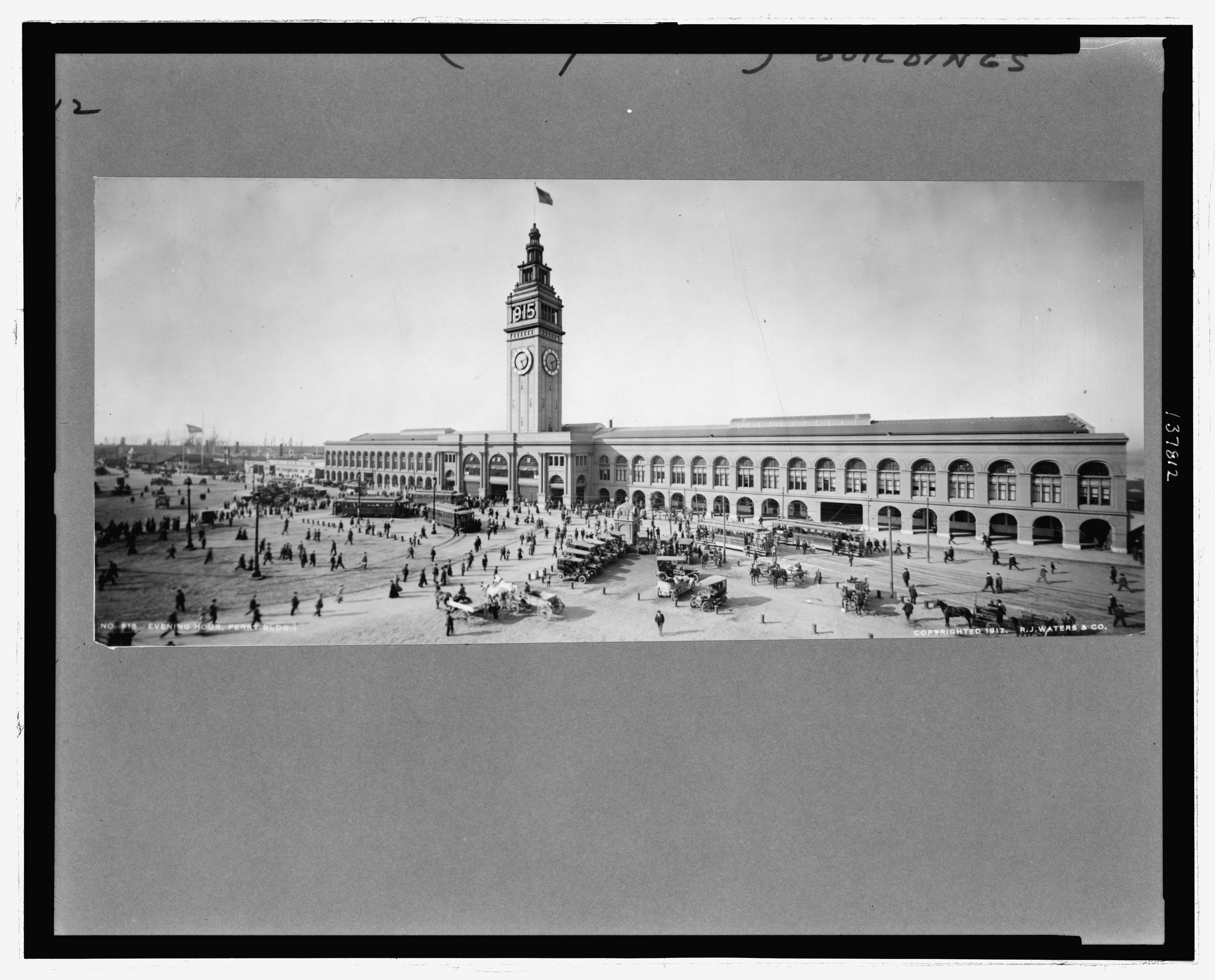
Ferry Building in 1915 from R. J. Waters & Company

== Ferry service ==
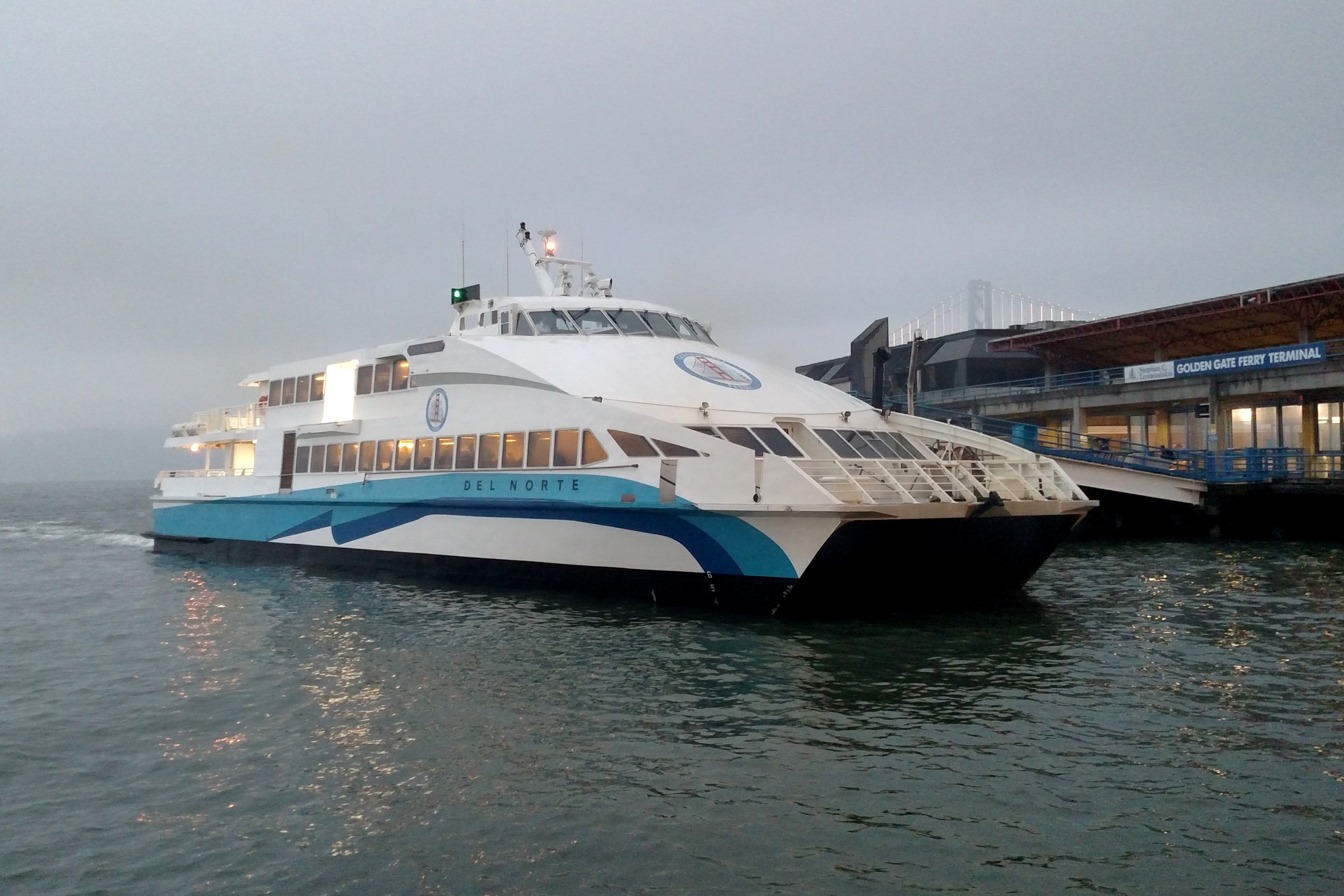
MV Del Norte at the Golden Gate Ferry Terminal in 2018

The Ferry Building is the primary San Francisco terminal for commuter ferry service (Pier 41 is used primarily for excursions). The facility has six ferry piers lettered Gate B through Gate G. Gate B, used by the San Francisco Bay Ferry Vallejo/Mare Island route and the Treasure Island Ferry is adjacent to the north end of the building. Gates C and D are the Golden Gate Ferry Terminal, located on a larger wharf near the center of the Ferry Building. They are used by Golden Gate Ferry service on the Sausalito, Tiburon, and Larkspur routes. Gates E through G are located south of the south end of the building; they are used by San Francisco Bay Ferry services on the Oakland/Alameda, Alameda Harbor Bay, and Richmond routes. Privately run service to Berkeley docks at Pier 1 1/2 to the north.

The Golden Gate Ferry Terminal, which is located on a wharf built in the late 1960s as part of the Transbay Tube, opened with the introduction of Golden Gate Ferry in 1976. Vallejo service was added in September 1986. When emergency ferry service was added after the 1989 earthquake, Alameda service docked between Pier 7 and Pier 9, Berkeley service docked at Pier 1 1/2, and all other service used the existing Ferry Building piers. Berkeley and Richmond service ended in March 1990, but Oakland/Alameda service continued, with Harbor Bay service added in March 1992. These services used a new pier constructed north of the Ferry Building at Pier 1/2 (adjacent to Pier 1). The modern Gate B and Gate E opened in October 2001 as part of the larger renovation of the Ferry Building.

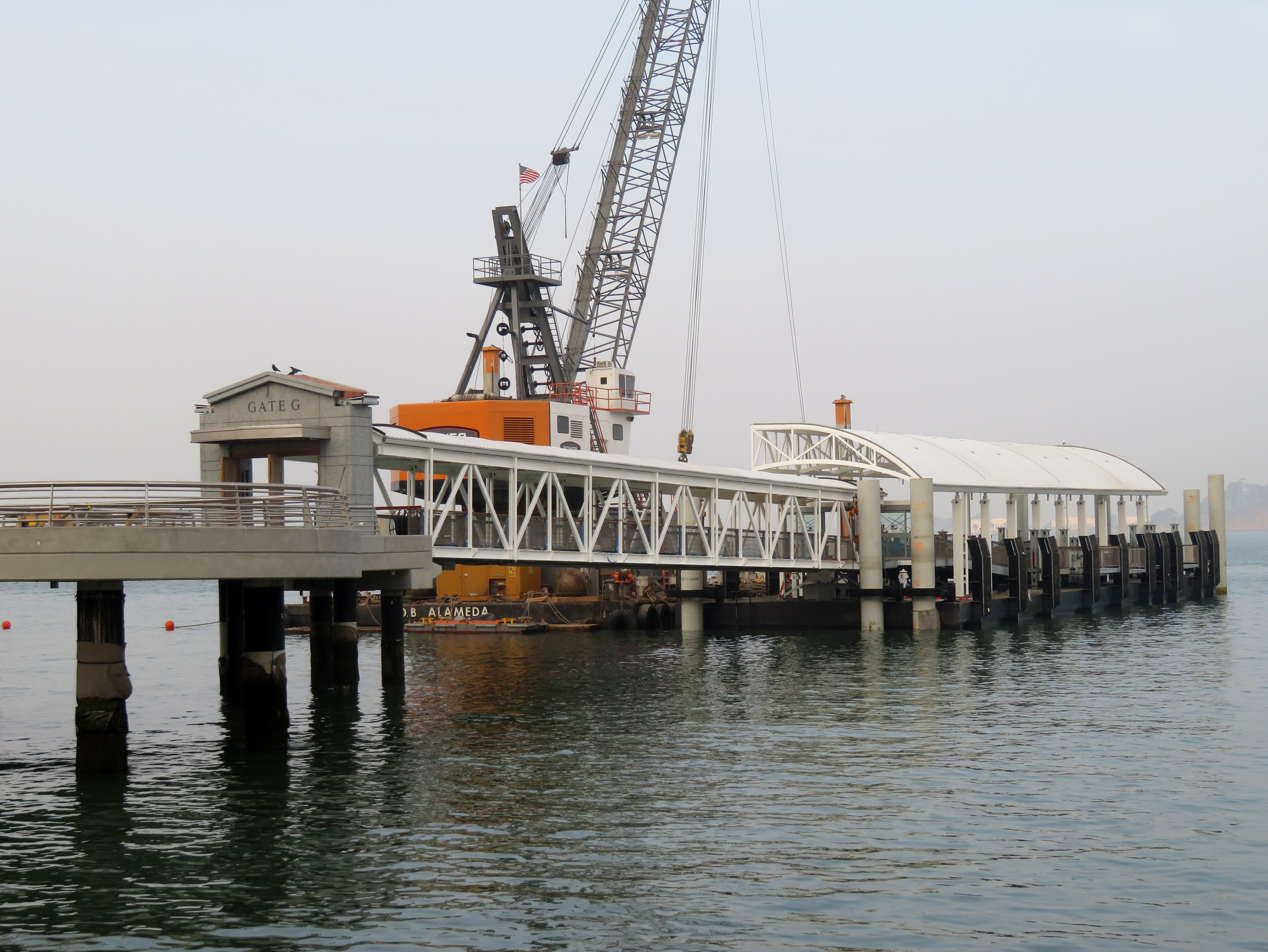
Construction of Gate G in November 2018

The 2001–2003 renovation anticipated a future phase to add additional capacity. Around 2008, WETA and the Port of San Francisco began planning the construction of three new ferry piers to support increased frequencies and new routes. Environmental planning for the Downtown San Francisco Ferry Terminal Expansion Project began in 2011, with an Environmental Impact Statement released in 2014. Construction of Gate A in the North Basin was deferred, with focus shifted to the South Basin improvements. These include the addition of Gates F and G behind the Agriculture Building, reconstruction of Gate E, and the creation of a new public plaza between Gate E and The Embarcadero. A groundbreaking ceremony was held for the then-$79 million project on May 11, 2017. Gate G opened in December 2018, followed by Gate F on February 14, 2019, allowing Gate E to close for reconstruction. Gate E reopened in February 2020, and the $98 million project was completed in August 2020.

== Transit connections ==
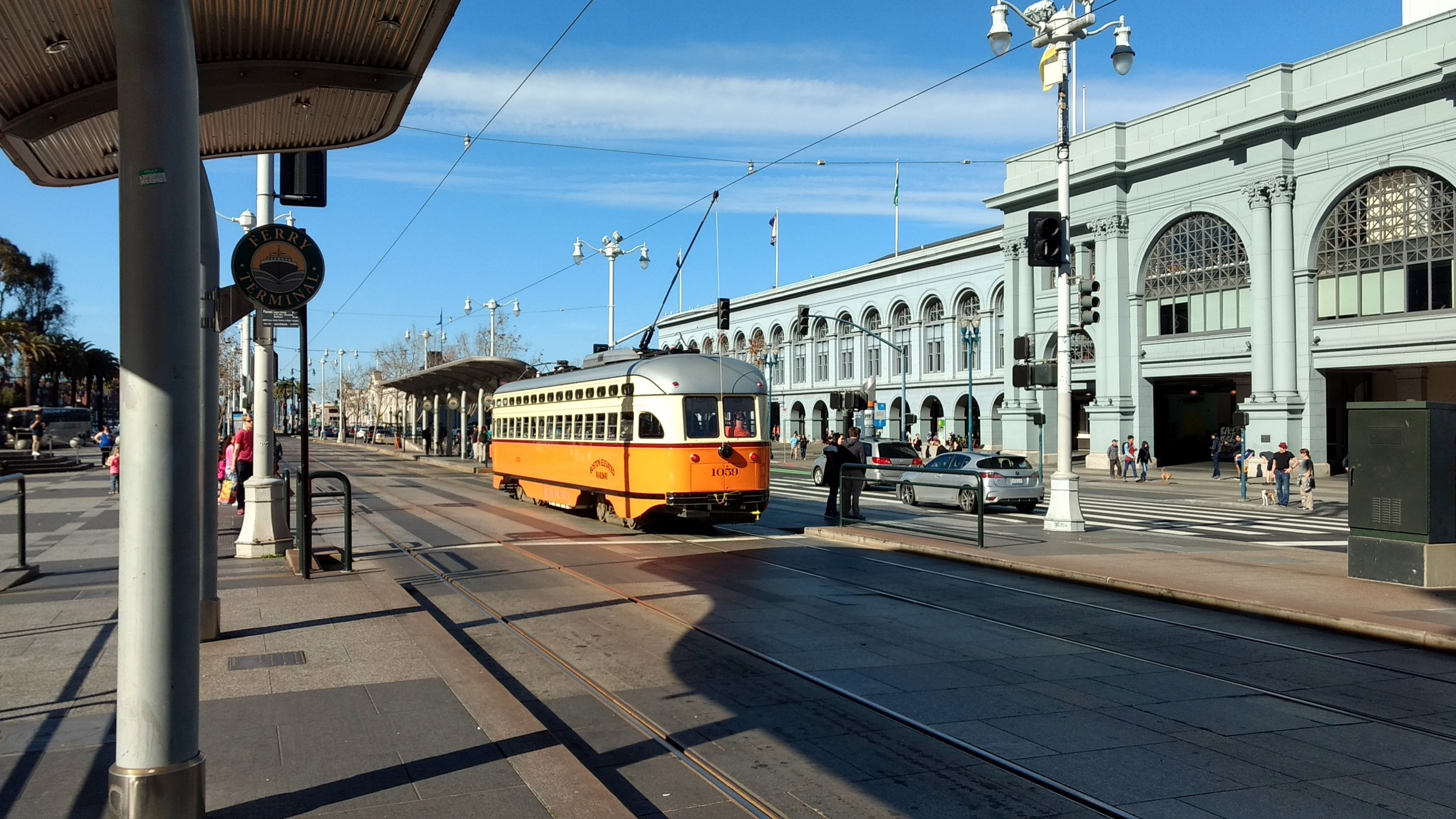
F Market & Wharves streetcar at the Ferry Building in 2018

The F Market & Wharves, a Muni historic streetcar line stops at a surface station located on the pedestrian plaza in front of the Ferry Building. The station (which is signed as Ferry Building, but also known as The Embarcadero/Ferry Building) opened with the extension of F Market service to Fisherman's Wharf on March 4, 2000.

No Muni bus routes run directly to the Ferry Building, but many stop in the surrounding area near Embarcadero station, the closest Muni Metro and BART station. The terminal is also served by a single northbound SolTrans route 82 bus trip in the late evening, intended for passengers who miss the last ferry to Vallejo.

== See also ==
- 49-Mile Scenic Drive
- Central Embarcadero Piers Historic District
- Ferries of San Francisco Bay
- List of San Francisco Designated Landmarks
