= Cort Theatre (San Francisco) =

Demolished theatre in California, US

- Curran Theatre, Century Theatre, Morosco Theatre, Capitol Theatre
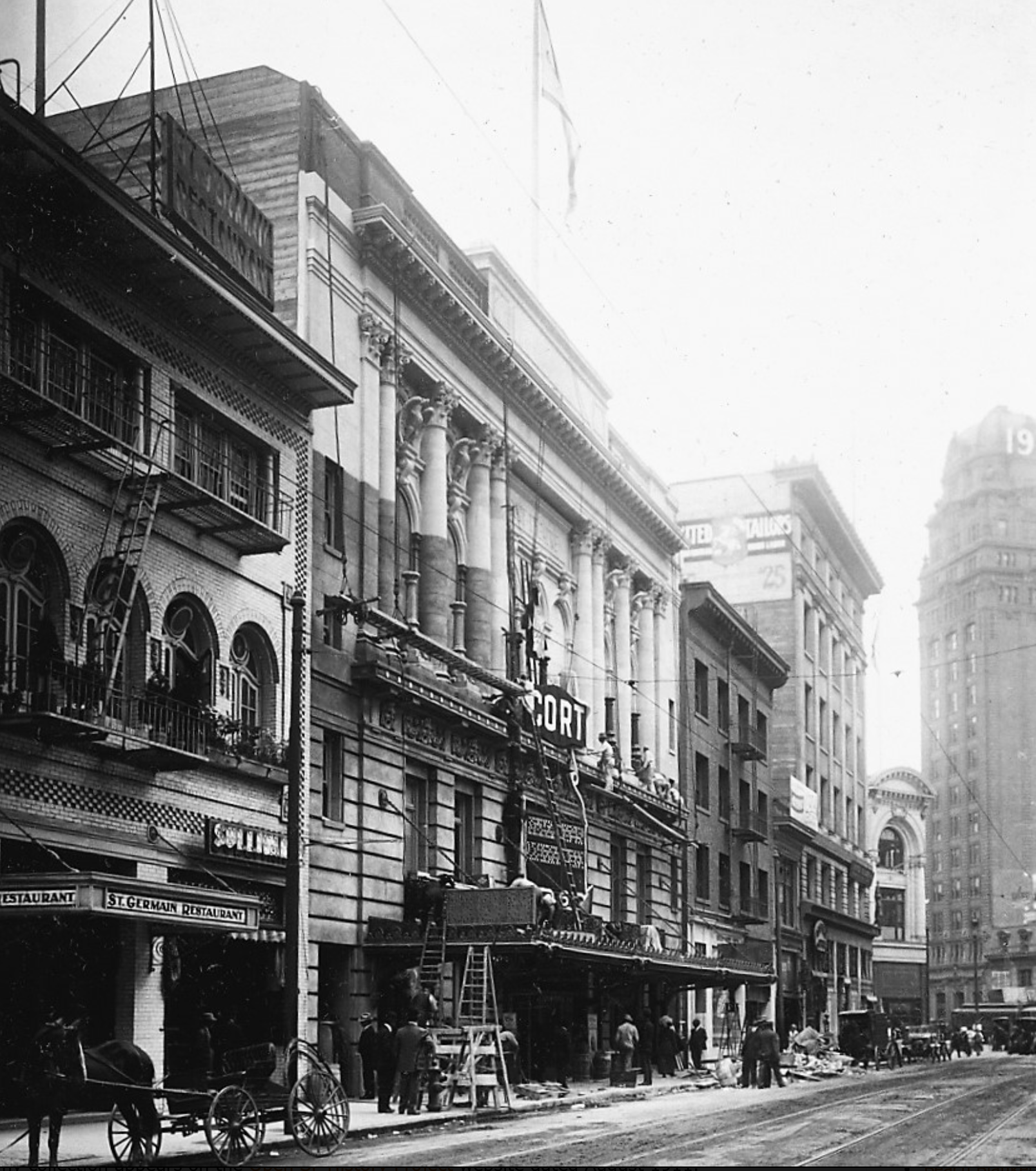
- Exterior of Cort Theatre while under construction in 1910
- Interactive map of Cort Theatre
- Address: 64 Ellis St. San Francisco, California; United States
- Coordinates: 37.7858°N 122.4072°W
- Owner: Multiple investors managed by the Madison Realty company
- Capacity: 1,845

Construction
- Opened: September 2, 1911 (114 years ago)
- Closed: 1941
- Architect: Henry Ives Cobb

The Cort Theatre, sometimes spelled Cort Theater, was a theatre in San Francisco, California, United States. Located at 64 Ellis Street in the Tenderloin neighborhood, it was designed by architect Henry Ives Cobb. One of the larger venues in San Francisco during its existence, the theater had a seating capacity of 1,845 people. The theatre was built under the leadership of impresario John Cort, and opened in 1911. The newly created San Francisco Symphony began performing at the theatre during its inaugural season in 1911, and continued to perform there until 1922.

Homer Curran had served as manager of the Cort Theatre under John Cort since it opened in September 1911. He bought out Cort's interest in the theatre in 1918, and the Cort Theatre was renamed the Curran Theatre in September of that year. Curran remained a financial investor in the theatre until selling his interest in December 1920 to raise capital to build his own theatre. That other theatre was also named the Curran Theatre and opened in 1922.

The old Curran Theatre was re-named the Century Theatre in September 1921. The theatre became the Morosco Theatre in April 1922 when the theatre was leased by theatrical producer Oliver Morosco, only to have its name changed back to the Century Theatre again the following November when the firm of Ackerman & Harris took over the lease. In June 1923 the theatre was rebranded a final time to the Capitol Theatre. It remained the Capitol Theatre until 1941 when the theatre closed permanently and was demolished. In the 1910s and 1920s the theatre was used as a venue for a variety of plays, musicals, operas, concerts, and silent film screenings, but in the 1930s it became a burlesque theatre establishment.

== Cort Theatre ==
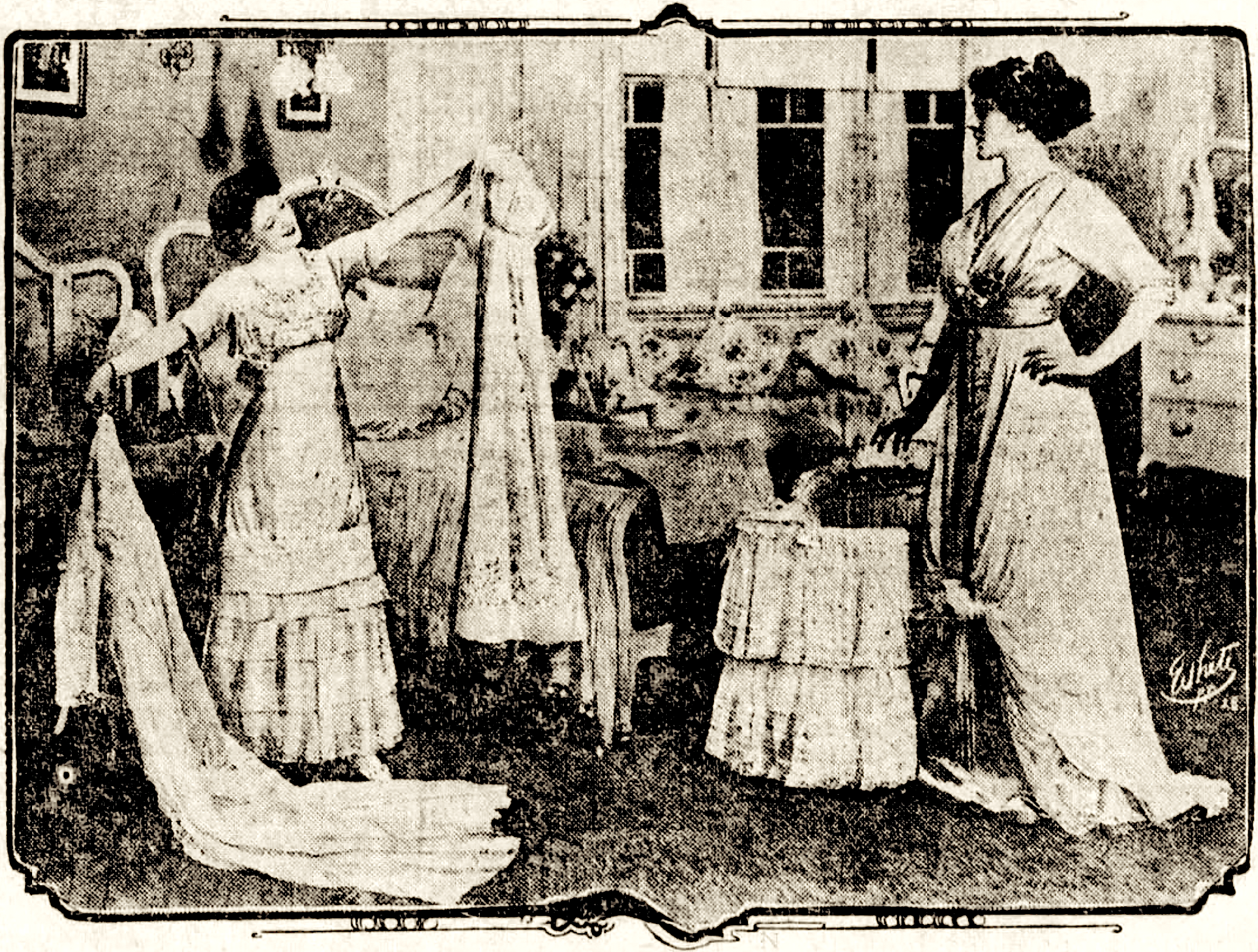
Actresses Marjorie Cortland and Agnes De Lane performing in Baby Mine for the opening of the Cort Theatre on September 2, 1911

The Cort Theatre (CT) was built at a cost of approximately one million dollars by the Madison Realty company which had been contracted to build the theatre by investors organized by the William Morris Agency under the leadership of Walter Hoff Seely. Originally the theatre was conceived as a concert hall venue for San Francisco, but its plans were altered to that of a proscenium theatre after impresario John Cort succeeded Seely as the guiding force behind the project. Owned by its investment group under the auspices of Madison Realty, Cort became the theatre's first lessee and it was named for him.

The CT was design by architect Henry Ives Cobb who employed Spanish Renaissance architecture into his design. It opened on September 2, 1911 with a performance of Margaret Mayo's Baby Mine. Several prominent California citizens were in the audience, including California's governor, Hiram Johnson. The theatre was also utilized in 1911-1912 by the newly created San Francisco Symphony (SFS) who performed their first season at the theatre. This included the symphony's first concert which occurred on December 8, 1911 with a "crowded house" in attendance.

The SFS was still in residence at the theatre when Paul Whiteman joined the violin section of the orchestra for its 1915–1916 season. The soprano Maude Fay performed with the orchestra at the CT that season. The world premiere of Frederick Jacobi's A California Suite was performed by the SFS at the CT on December 6, 1917.

In 1912 the CT was leased by William A. Brady and the Shubert brothers whose Gilbert and Sullivan all star opera company was bringing in profits of $25,000.00 a week. The same year the theatre presented the first performance in the Western United States of Puccini's La fanciulla del West with Giorgio Polacco leading the musical forces. In April 1914 Al Jolson starred in a production of The Honeymoon Express at the theatre, and the following December the magician Servais Le Roy was a featured performer at the CT.

The CT was also used as a silent film cinema and was one of several theatres that played the film The Fall of a Nation in 1916 with a live 16-piece orchestra performing a score by Victor Herbert to accompany the film. The following year a 25-piece orchestra accompanied the film Joan the Woman which starred opera singer Geraldine Farrar as Joan of Arc.

In the Fall of 1916 the CT was host to the California based La Scala Opera Company which performed a production of Donizetti's Lucia di Lammermoor with Nina Morgana in the title role. In 1917 Eva Tanguay gave a performance of her popular A Vision of Salome at the CT, and soprano Blanche Duffield starred in the title role of a production of The Princess Pat at the theatre. The original Broadway cast of the musical The Blue Paradise came to theatre in March 1917 following the close of its New York production at the Casino Theatre. In April 1918 the musical Oh, Boy! was staged at the theatre with a cast led by Lavinia Winn and Joseph Santley.

== Curran Theatre ==
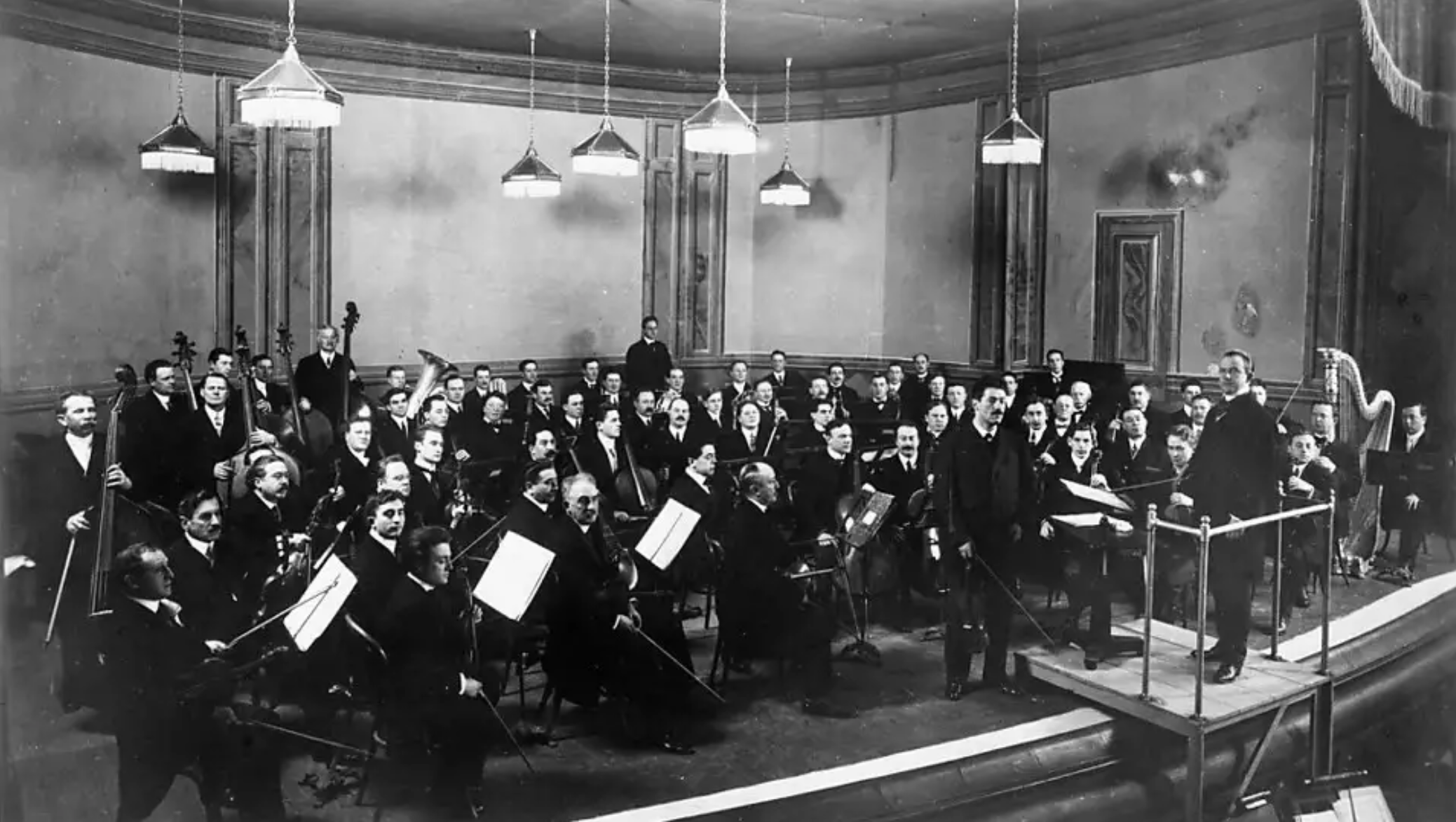
San Francisco Symphony (SFS) at the Cort Theatre for its inaugural concert on December 8, 1911. The SFS continued to perform at the theatre through 1922.

Theatrical producer Homer Curran had served as manager of the Cort Theatre since it opened in 1911. In September 1918 it was announced that Curran had taken over the theatre, and it was re-named the Curran Theatre on September 22, 1918. Some sources state Curran purchased the Cort Theatre prior to its re-naming, and sold it in 1922. However, a December 1920 report in Variety reports he divested of his financial interests in the theatre, indicating he was only one of several financial investors in the theatre at the time of that sale. He sold his shares in the Curran Theatre with the intention of building a new theatre with funds raised through that sale. The sale was prompted by an agreement he had made with the Shuberts in which they agreed to lease the new theatre from Curran for a period of ten years.

Although Curran sold his financial interests in the old Curran Theatre in December 1920, he remained the theatre's lessee and manager through September 1, 1921. During his three year tenure at the theatre he worked closely with the Shubert family's theatrical enterprise, and the theatre was booked with productions the Shuberts brought into the Curran. Some of the productions performed at the theatre during the time included Thompson Buchanan's Civilian Clothes (1919), the Fanchon and Marco Revue (1919), and The Girl in the Limousine (1920). In 1921 Fortune Gallo's San Carlo Opera Company performed for three weeks at the theatre, performing a total of 18 different operas.

The SFS orchestra remained committed to performing at the Curran Theatre, and opened its 1918-1919 season at the newly renamed theatre with Tchaikovsky's Symphony No. 5 on December 1, 1918. The SFS maintained their relationship with Homer Curran after the new Curran Theatre was built, and switched to performing at that new theatre in 1922.

== Century, Morosco, and Capitol Theatres ==
=== Final years as a playhouse and concert hall ===
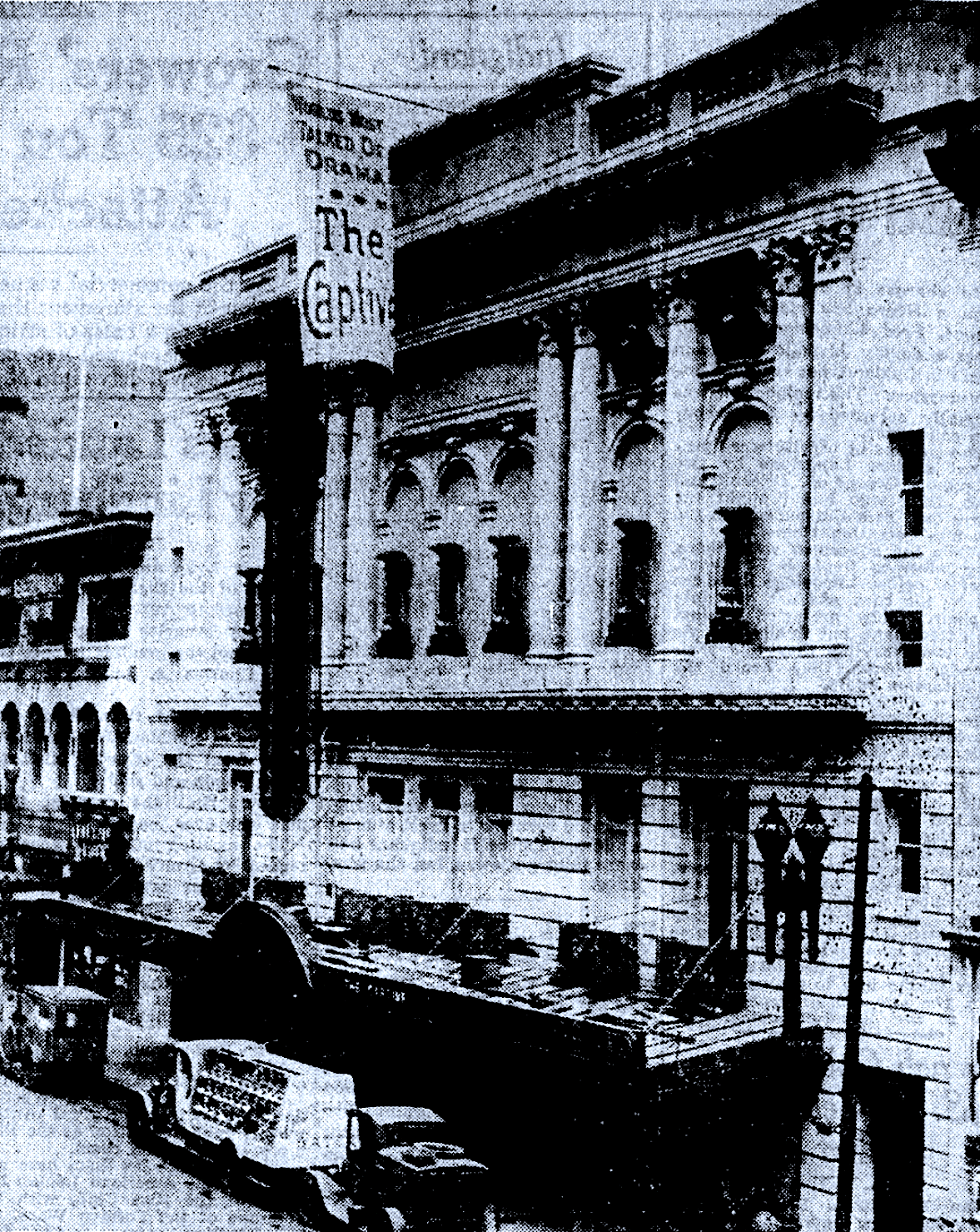
Exterior of the Capitol Theatre in 1928

After the departure of Curran, the theatre was renamed multiple times. In September 1921 Herbert A. Harris and Charles H. Brown took over the lease of the theatre, and it was rebranded the Century Theatre beginning with a screening of William Fox's silent film The Queen of Sheba. In April 1922 it was renamed the Morosco Theatre when theatrical producer Oliver Morosco bought out the lease from Harris and Brown. It continued to operate under that name until November 1922 when it reverted once again to the Century Theatre after the firm of Ackerman & Harris took over the lease from Morosco.

The theatre was re-named one final time in 1923 when it was rebranded the Capitol Theatre. This name change occurred in June 1923 when Louis Lurie took over the lease of the theatre. Lurie soon after formed a partnership with fellow Broadway producer Thomas Wilkes, and the two men planned a season of plays brought into San Francisco from the New York stage. The theatre went under renovations, and re-opened with a production of Gladys Buchanan Unger's The Goldfish on July 15, 1923. Its cast was led by Marjorie Rambeau in the role of Jenny, and the production had just completed their run at Broadway's Maxine Elliott's Theatre before arriving in San Francisco. This production was immediately followed by the world premiere of the play The Valley of Content by Blanche Upright, a work adapted by the writer from her earlier novel of the same name. It too starred Rambeau.

In August 1923 the actress Nance O'Neil and her theatre troupe were engaged at the Capitol Theatre with actress starring in performances of Jacinto Benavente's The Passion Flower and George Bernard Shaw's Man and Superman. In September 1923 soprano Mabel Riegelman starred in a production of The Firefly at the theatre. Later that month Lurie sold his lease to Herbert L. Rothschild Entertainment, Inc.

In 1928 the theatre was extensively renovated by the R.A. McLean & Co., including brand new flooring installed throughout the building, while it was being leased by Jack Brehany. The newly remodeled theatre re-opened on July 14, 1928 with a production of Édouard Bourdet's The Captive. Arturo Casiglia and his newly created Pacific Coast Opera Company performed a season of grand opera at the theatre in 1929, including performances of Norma, La traviata, and a double bill of Pagliacci and Cavalleria rusticana.

=== Burlesque venue ===
The Capitol Theatre suffered financially during the Great Depression, and not long after the Wall Street crash of 1929 it became San Francisco's main burlesque theatre. The theatre's transformation from a higher-class theatre into an American burlesque venue was done by the theatrical producer Warren Irons, who began staging burlesque at the Capitol with the show Bare Facts in June 1930. The resident burlesque company of performers as originally envisioned by Irons contained an all-female cast with a large chorus of 60 young women.

The Capitol's burlesque entertainments enjoyed popularity into the late 1930s before closing its doors permanently in 1941. The 1938 show The Capitol Follies included a midnight screening of the anti-cannabis exploitation film Assassin of Youth which warned of the "wild orgies" marijuana consumption could lead to. It was presented alongside multiple strip tease numbers and dancing, comedic, and singing acts. On January 13, 1939 one the Capitol's dancers, Vicky Darrin, made headlines in The San Francisco Examiner after she was arrested for allegedly not wearing a bra during her strip tease number; the dancer claimed that she had worn one but it was made to look like an optical illusion of nudity. The paper reported that it was one of several similar arrests of dancers at the Capitol made by San Francisco police.

== Fate ==
The Capitol Theatre was bought by the Flood family of "Bonanza Kings" fame in May 1941 with the intent of turning it into a parking lot. It was demolished later that year. Currently, the SFMTA Ellis-O'Farrell multi-story parking garage stands on the site of the former theatre.

== Gallery ==
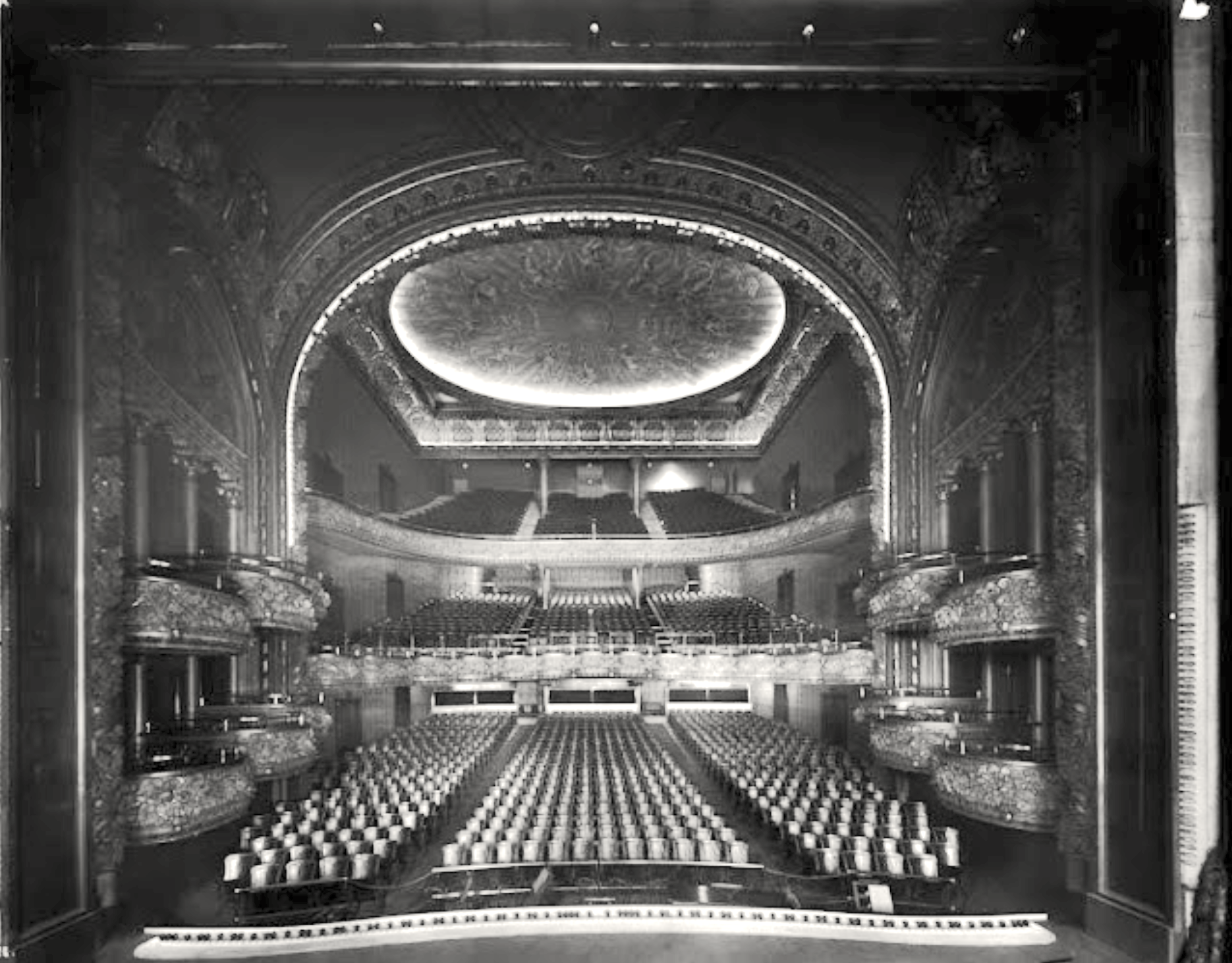
Interior of Cort Theatre by R. J. Waters

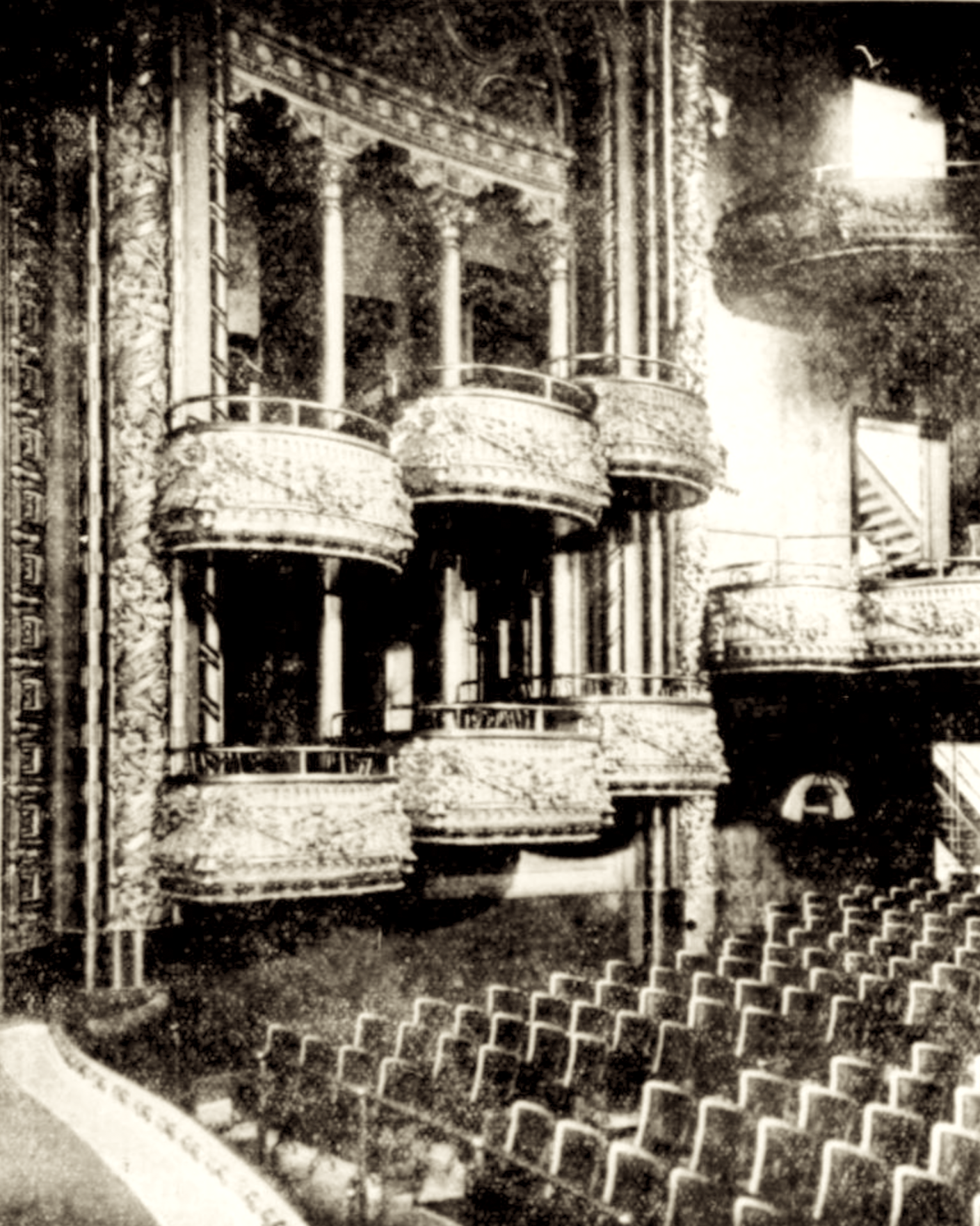
Interior of Cort Theatre, 1911

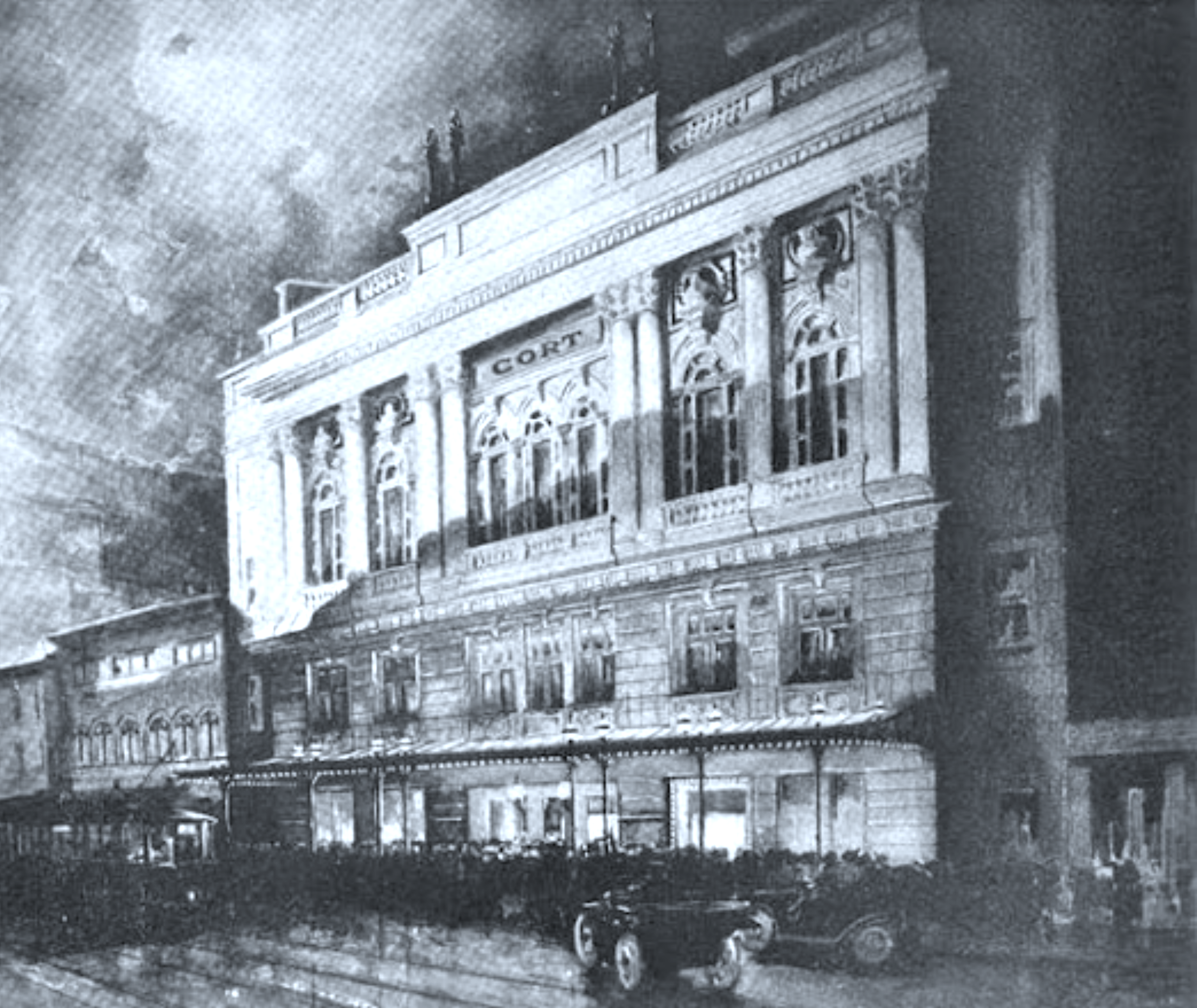
1912 illustration of the Cort Theatre
