= Treasure Island Ferry =

Public transit passenger ferry

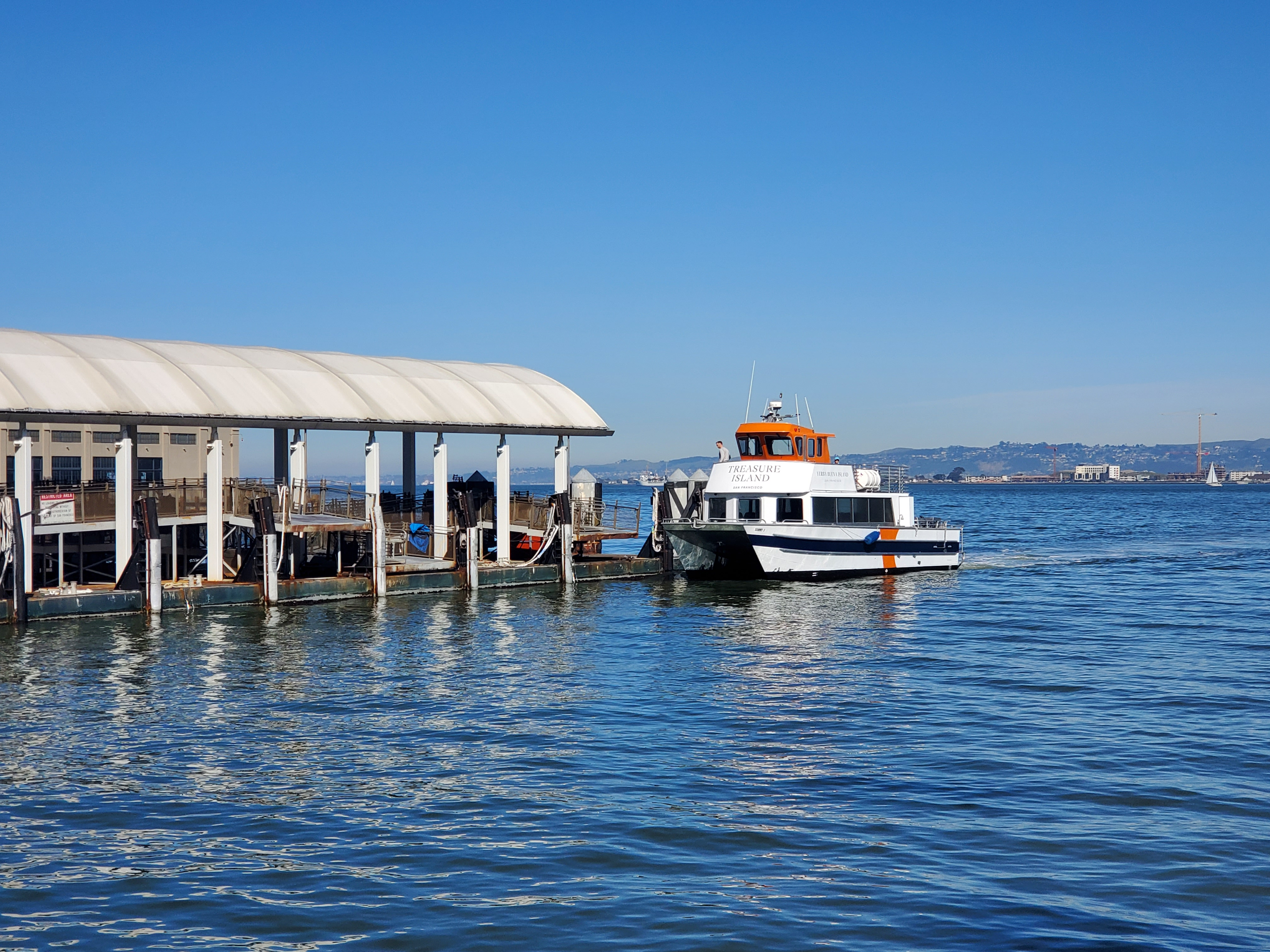
- Treasure Island Ferry arriving at the Ferry Building in 2023
- Locale: Treasure Island, San Francisco
- Waterway: San Francisco Bay
- Transit type: Passenger ferry
- Owner: Treasure Island Development Authority
- Operator: Prop SF, under contract with Treasure Island Community Development
- Began operation: March 1, 2022
- No. of lines: 1
- No. of vessels: 1
- No. of terminals: 2
- Website: tisf.com

Treasure Island Ferry is a public transit passenger ferry service between the Treasure Island Ferry Terminal on Treasure Island, part of the city of San Francisco, and the San Francisco Ferry Building on the mainland. Ferries operate daily with financial support from Treasure Island Community Development, a group of property developers building new apartments on the island, and are operated by a contractor, Prop SF using a 48-passenger boat.

Service started on March 1, 2022. Eventually, the city of San Francisco's Treasure Island Development Authority plans to transfer operation of the route to the San Francisco Bay Ferry system which will operate the route with 100-passenger ferries.
