= The Embarcadero and Washington station =

Washington & The Embarcadero
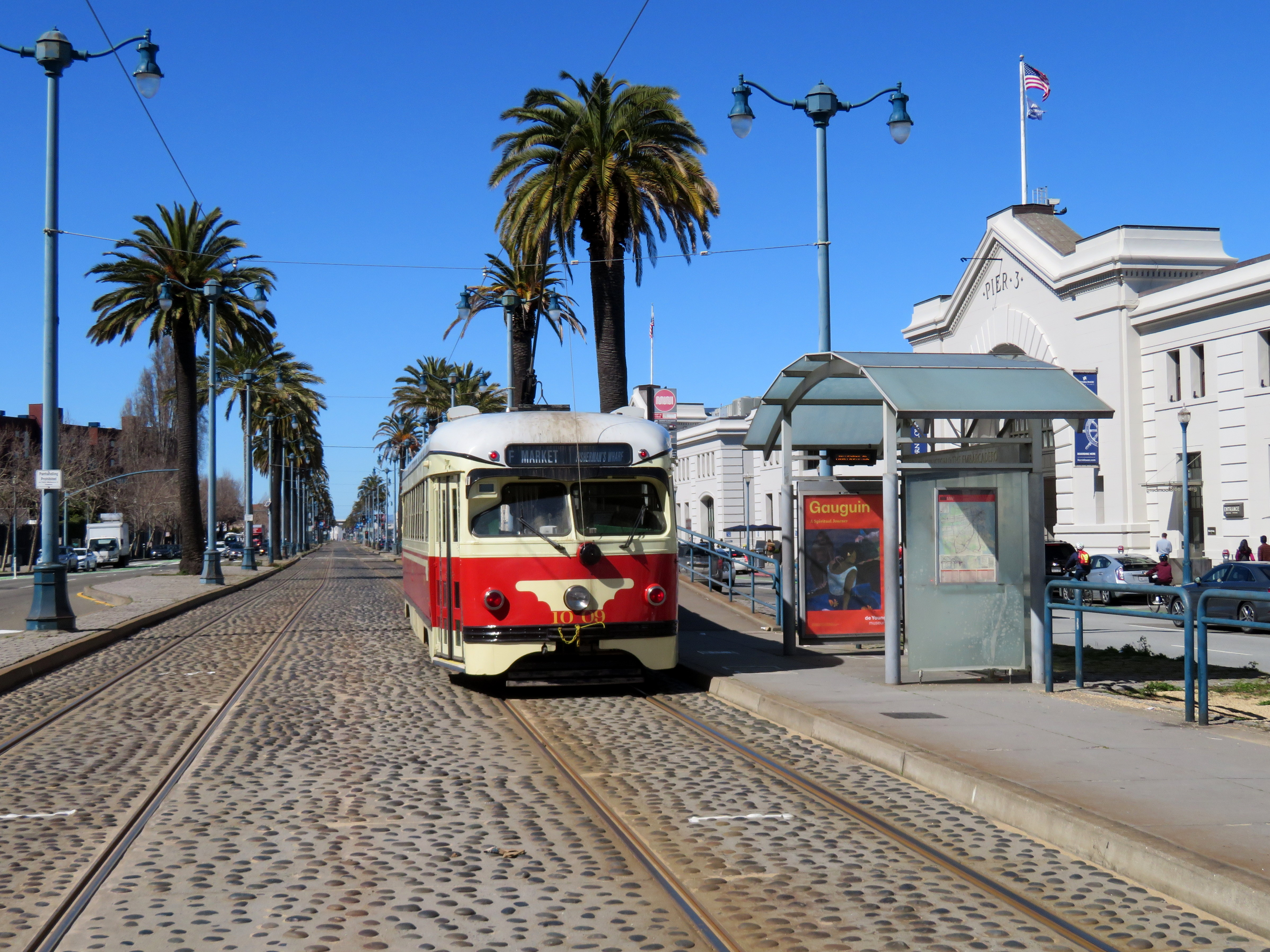
- A northbound streetcar at the station in March 2019

General information
- Location: The Embarcadero at Washington Street; San Francisco, California
- Coordinates: 37.797069°N 122.395711°W
- Platforms: 2 side platforms
- Tracks: 2

Construction
- Accessible: Yes

History
- Opened: March 4, 2020

Services
Preceding station	Muni	Following station
The Embarcadero and Broadway toward Jones and Beach	F Market & Wharves	Ferry Building toward 17th Street and Castro
Former services
Preceding station	Muni	Following station
The Embarcadero and Broadway toward Jones and Beach	E Embarcadero Suspended	Ferry Building toward 4th and King
Location

The Embarcadero and Washington station is a streetcar station in San Francisco, California, serving the San Francisco Municipal Railway's F Market & Wharves historic streetcar line. It is located on The Embarcadero at Washington Street. The station opened on March 4, 2000, with the streetcar's extension to Fisherman's Wharf.

The stop is served by the L Owl bus route, which provides service along the F Market & Wharves and L Taraval lines during the late night hours when trains do not operate.
