= The Embarcadero and Greenwich station =

Greenwich & The Embarcadero
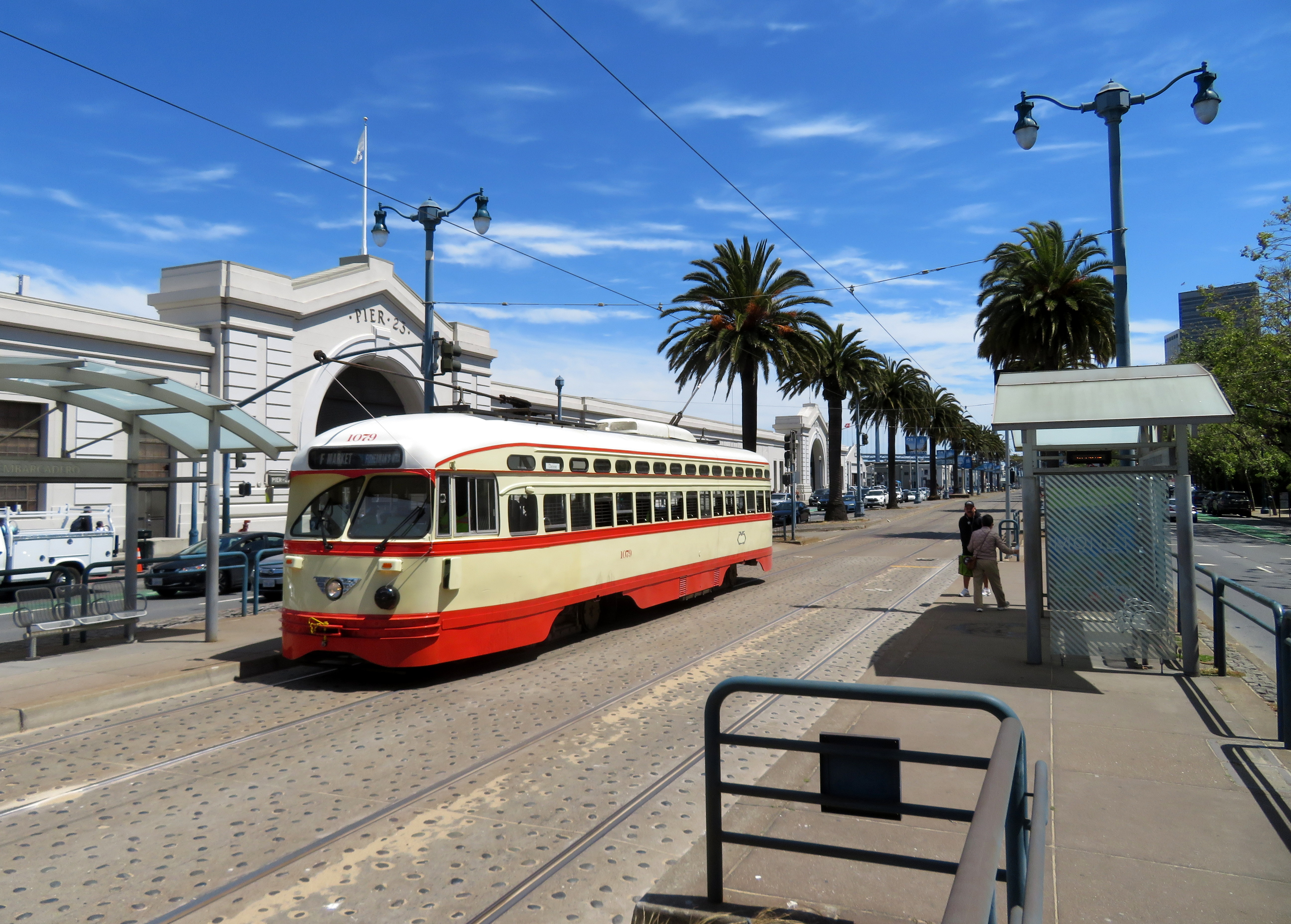
- A northbound streetcar at The Embarcadero and Greenwich in May 2019

General information
- Location: The Embarcadero at Greenwich Street; San Francisco, California
- Coordinates: 37°48′11″N 122°24′04″W
- Platforms: 2 side platforms
- Tracks: 2

Construction
- Accessible: Yes

History
- Opened: March 4, 2000

Services
Preceding station	Muni	Following station
The Embarcadero and Sansome toward Jones and Beach	F Market & Wharves	The Embarcadero and Green toward 17th Street and Castro
Former services
Preceding station	Muni	Following station
The Embarcadero and Sansome toward Jones and Beach	E Embarcadero	The Embarcadero and Green toward 4th and King
Location

The Embarcadero and Greenwich station is a streetcar station in San Francisco, California, serving the San Francisco Municipal Railway's F Market & Wharves historic streetcar line. It is located on The Embarcadero at Greenwich Street. The station opened on March 4, 2000, with the streetcar's extension to Fisherman's Wharf.

The stop is served by the L Owl bus route, which provides service along the F Market & Wharves and L Taraval lines during the late night hours when trains do not operate.
