= The Embarcadero and Broadway station =

Broadway & The Embarcadero
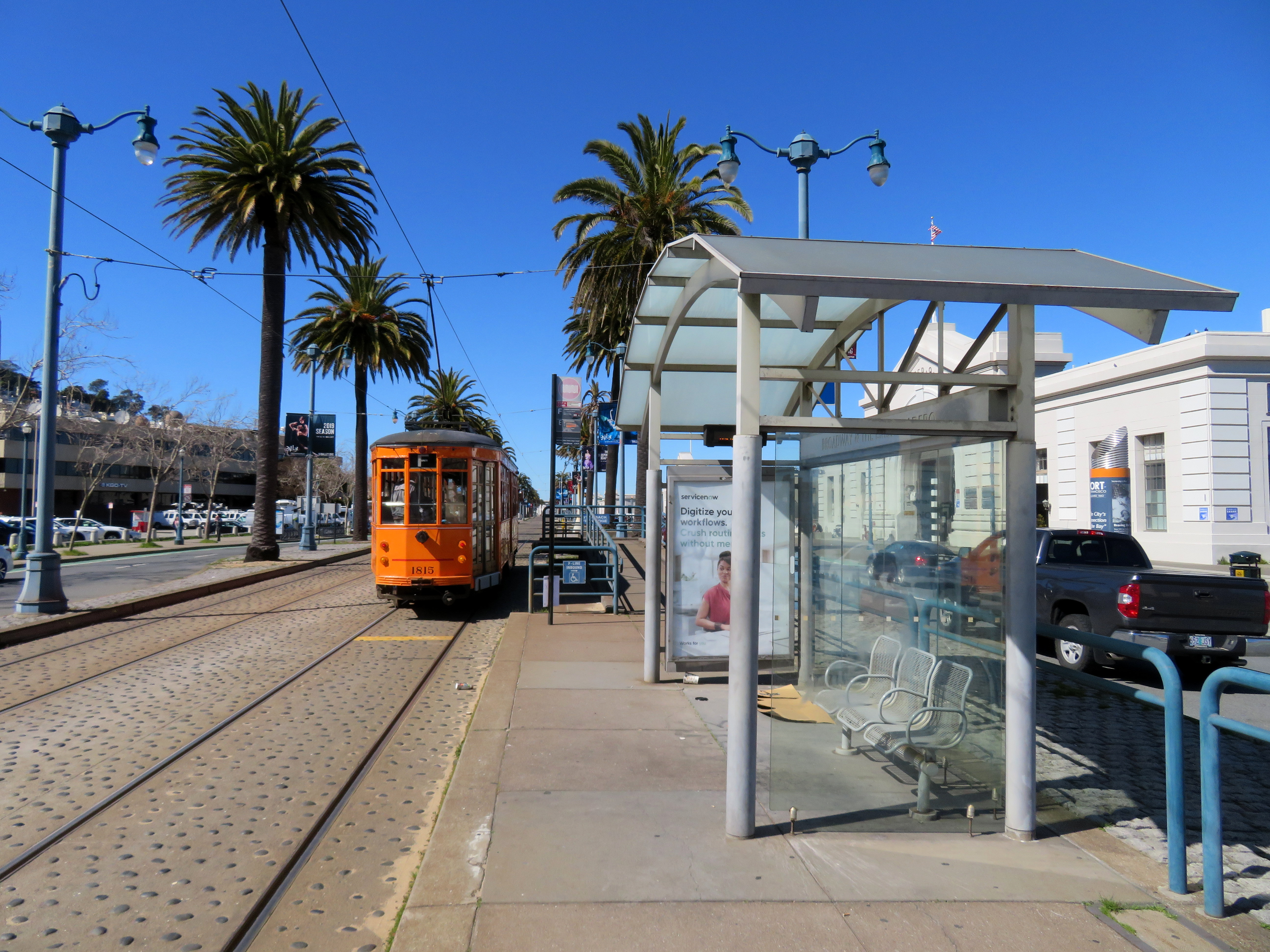
- A northbound streetcar at the station in March 2019

General information
- Location: The Embarcadero at Broadway; San Francisco, California
- Coordinates: 37°47′57″N 122°23′52″W
- Platforms: 2 side platforms
- Tracks: 2

Construction
- Accessible: Yes

History
- Opened: March 4, 2000

Services
Preceding station	Muni	Following station
The Embarcadero and Green toward Jones and Beach	F Market & Wharves	The Embarcadero and Washington toward 17th Street and Castro
Former services
Preceding station	Muni	Following station
The Embarcadero and Green toward Jones and Beach	E Embarcadero	The Embarcadero and Washington toward 4th and King
Location

The Embarcadero and Broadway station is a streetcar station in San Francisco, California, serving the San Francisco Municipal Railway's F Market & Wharves historic streetcar line. It is located on The Embarcadero at Broadway. The station opened on March 4, 2000, with the streetcar's extension to Fisherman's Wharf.

The stop is served by the L Owl bus route, which provides service along the F Market & Wharves and L Taraval lines during the late night hours when trains do not operate.
