= The Embarcadero and Green station =

Green & The Embarcadero
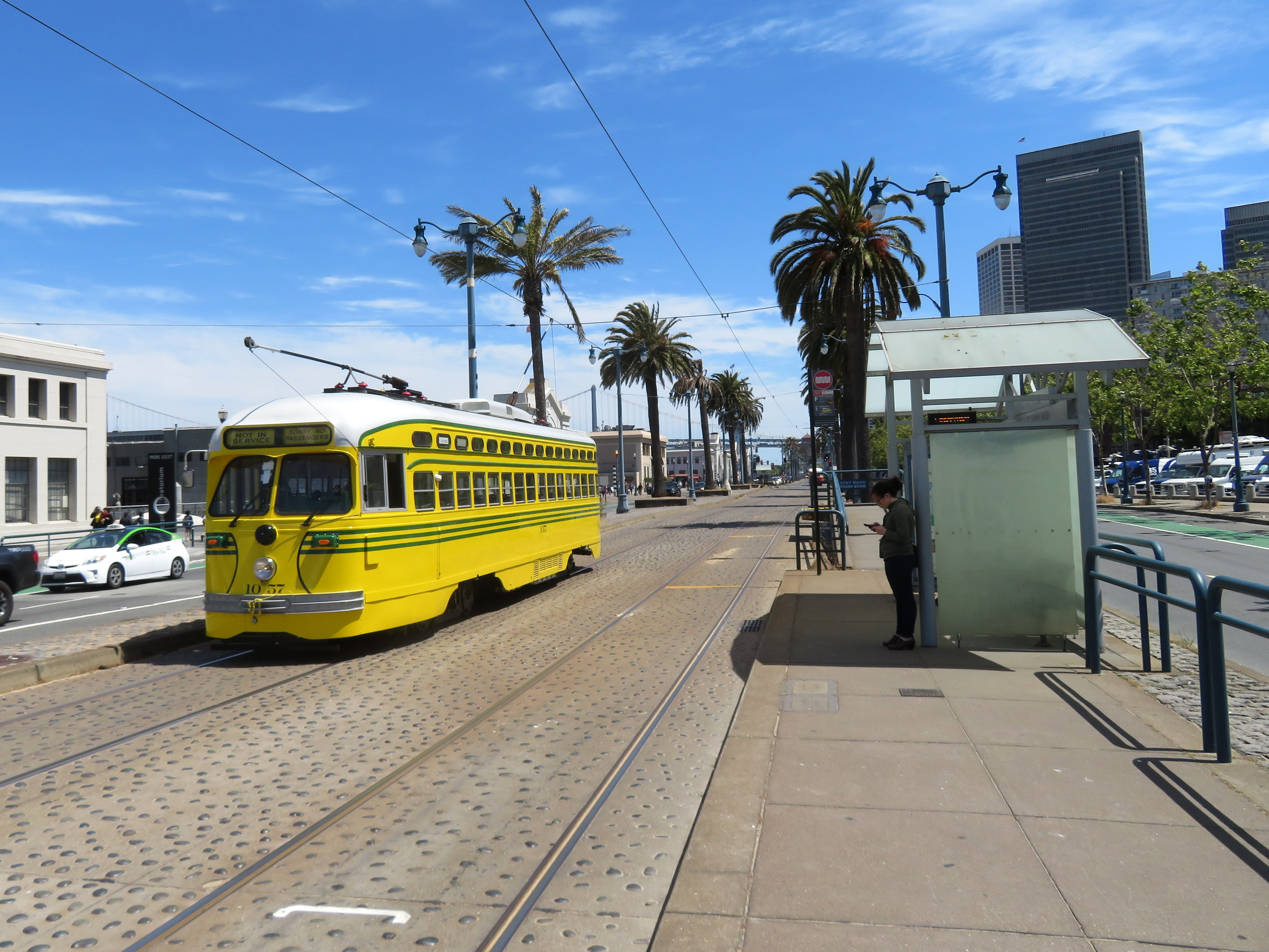
- A northbound streetcar at The Embarcadero and Green in May 2019

General information
- Other names: Exploratorium
- Location: The Embarcadero at Green Street; San Francisco, California
- Coordinates: 37°48′04″N 122°23′58″W
- Platforms: 2 side platforms
- Tracks: 2

Construction
- Accessible: Yes

History
- Opened: March 4, 2000

Services
| Preceding station | Muni | Following station |
|---|---|---|
| The Embarcadero and Greenwich toward Jones and Beach | F Market & Wharves | The Embarcadero and Broadway toward 17th Street and Castro |
Former services
| Preceding station | Muni | Following station |
|---|---|---|
| The Embarcadero and Greenwich toward Jones and Beach | E Embarcadero | The Embarcadero and Broadway toward 4th and King |
Location

The Embarcadero and Green station (also signed as Exploratorium) is a streetcar station in San Francisco, California, serving the San Francisco Municipal Railway's F Market & Wharves historic streetcar line. It is located on The Embarcadero at Green and Davis Streets, adjacent to the Exploratorium. The station opened on March 4, 2000, with the streetcar's extension to Fisherman's Wharf.

The stop is served by the L Owl bus route, which provides service along the F Market & Wharves and L Taraval lines during the late night hours when trains do not operate.
