= R. J. Waters =

American photographer

- Born: Raper James Waters; September 24, 1856; Sacramento, California, US
- Died: November 5, 1937 (aged 81); French Camp, US
- Known for: Photography
- Style: Monochrome photography

Raper James Waters (September 24, 1856 – November 5, 1937) was an American commercial photographer in California and Nevada.

== Early life ==
Raper James Waters was born on September 24, 1856, in Sacramento, California. His father was George Gilbert Waters (1822-) and his mother was Lydia Mary Milner (1817-1881). He had two sons with Anna M. Waters between 1892 and 1895.

== Career ==
In 1892, Waters opened, R. J. Waters & Co., a commercial photography studio at 110 Sutter Street, in San Francisco. Photographs by Waters are held at the J. Paul Getty Museum, the Metropolitan Museum of Art, the Library of Congress, the Online Archive of California, and the University of Nevada, Reno library.

The Library of Congress has two of his panoramic photographs from 1909, three years after the 1906 San Francisco Earthquake.

From 1910 to 1917, R. J. Waters & Co., photographed plays for the Forest Theater in Carmel-by-the-Sea, California.

== Death ==
Waters died on November 5, 1937, in French Camp, San Joaquin County, California, at the age of 81. According to the California Department of Public Health death certificate, he was cremated on November 8, at the Casa Bonita Funeral Home in Stockton, California. Private services were held from the chapel of Frisbie & Warren, Miner Avenue at American Street, Stockton on November 8.

== Gallery ==
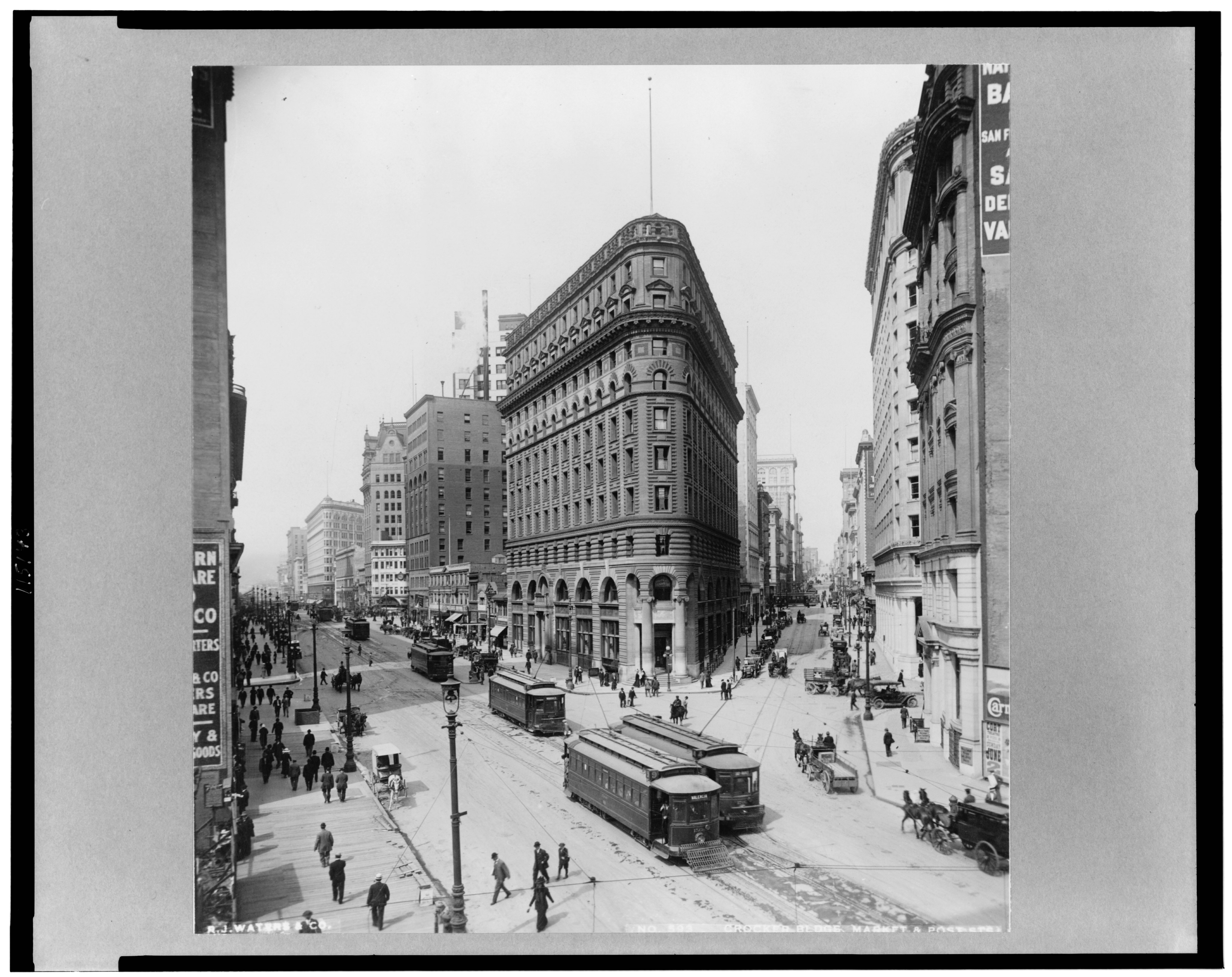
View of the Charles Crocker's Crocker Building in San Francisco (1912)

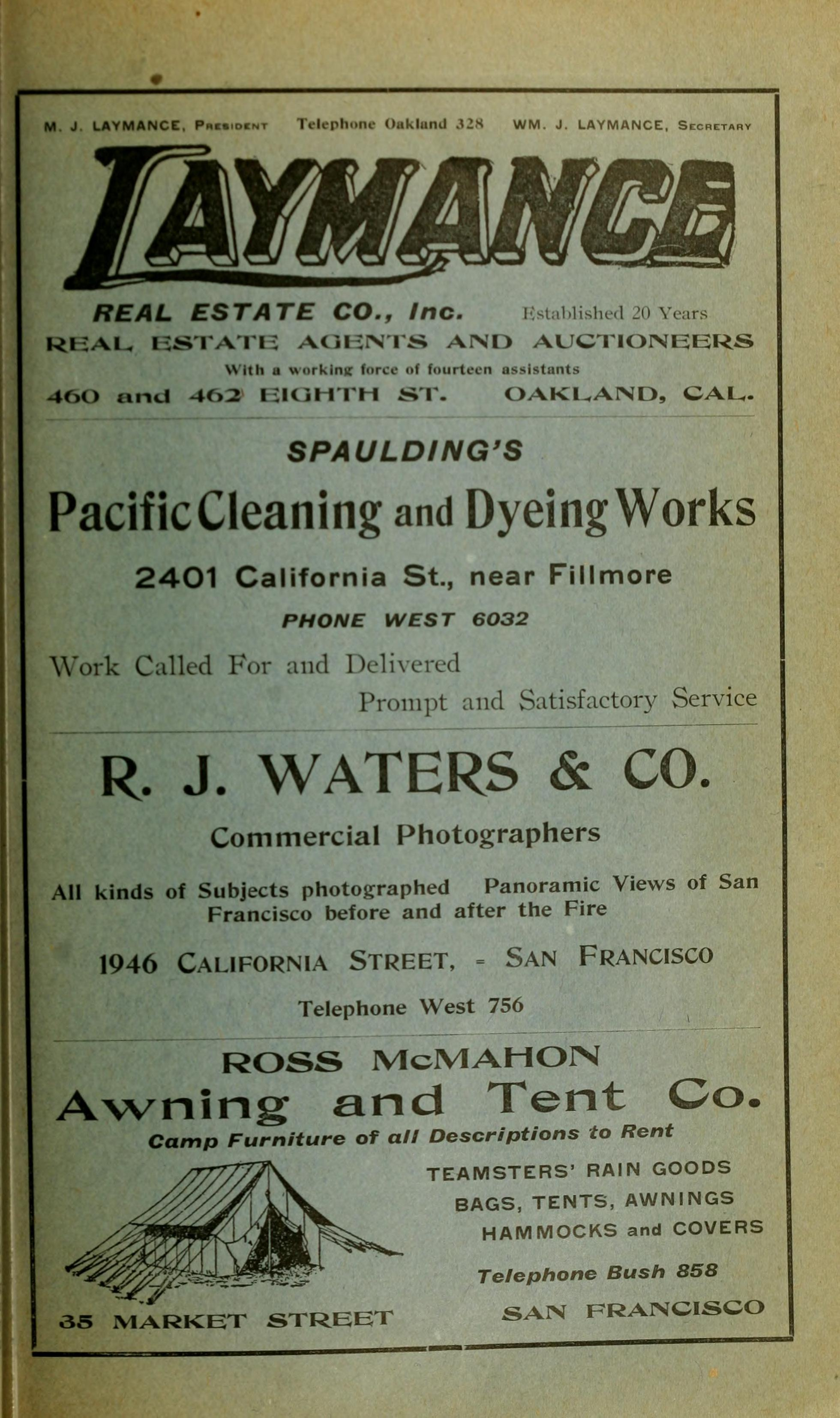
Ad

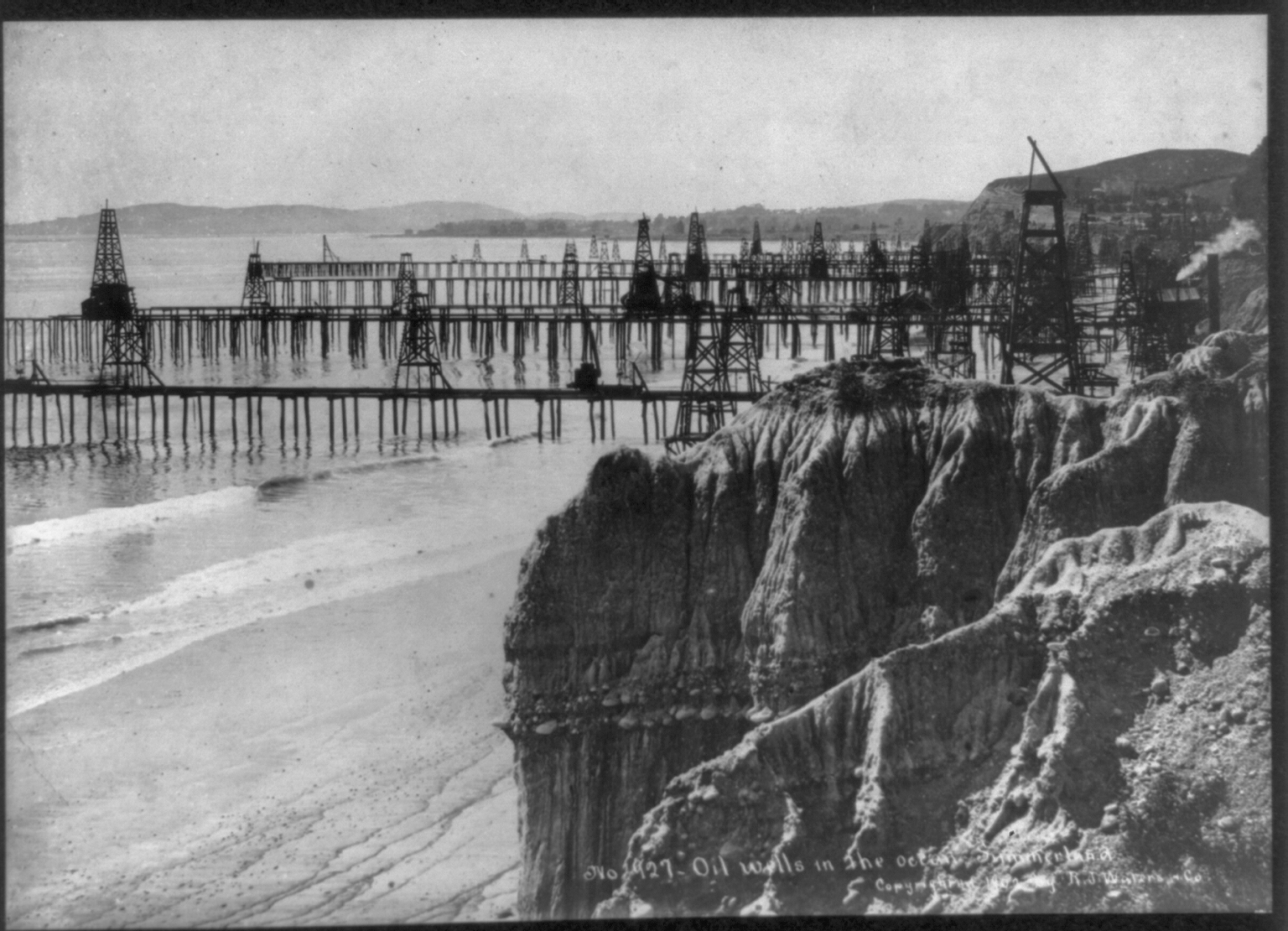
Shoreline oil wells in Summerland, California (1902)

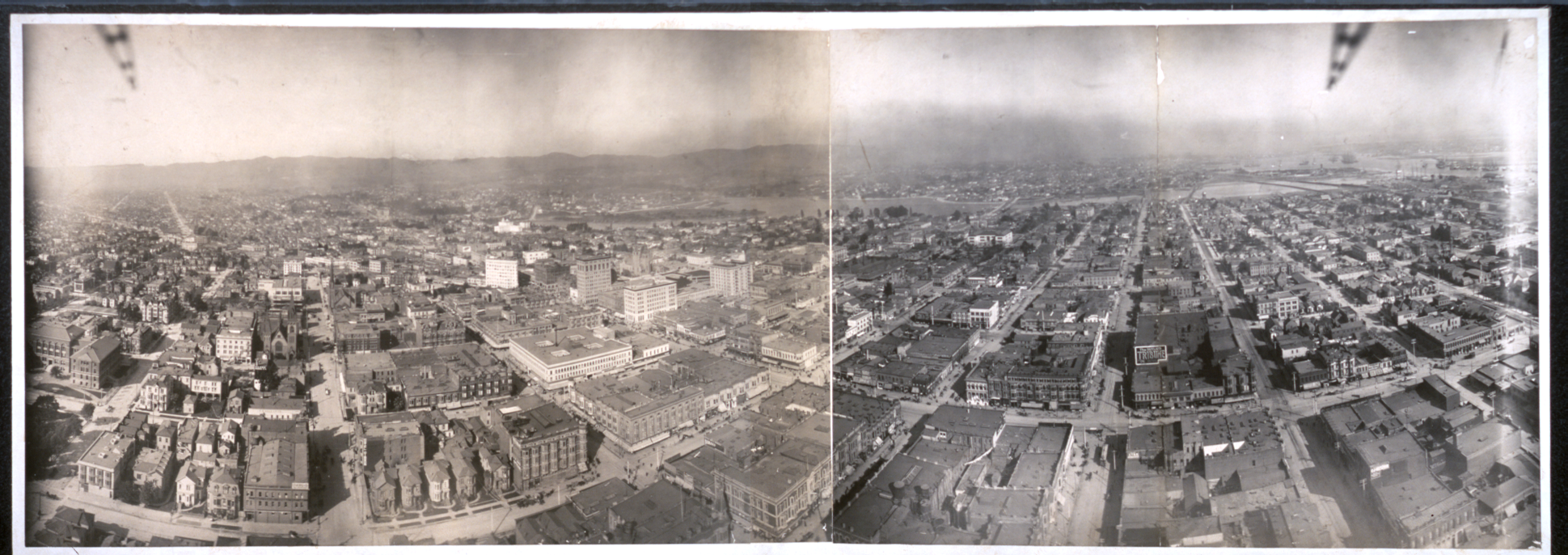
Aerial view gelatin silver print of Oakland from 1,000 feet
