= Kwak =

Kwak or KWAK may refer to:

== Radio Callsigns ==
- KWAK (AM), a radio station (1240 AM) licensed to serve Stuttgart, Arkansas, United States
- KWAK-FM, a radio station (105.5 FM), licensed to serve Stuttgart, Arkansas
- KWAK-LP, a low-power radio station (102.5 FM) licensed to serve San Xavier, Arizona, United States

== Surnames ==
- James Kwak, an American law professor
- Geesje Kwak, a Dutch art model
- Nang Kwak, a Thai Bodhisattva
- Pauwel Kwak, a Belgian ale named after an 18th-century innkeeper and brewer
- Alfred J. Kwak, a cartoon television series
- Kwak (surname), a Korean surname (郭, 霍) alternatively spelled Gwak

== Other ==
- Kwak, an alternative spelling of couac, a manioc flour.
- Kwak (store), a store in San Francisco that only sells rubber ducks

== See also ==
- Guo, a Chinese surname (郭) alternatively Romanized as Kwok
- Quack (disambiguation)
