= Lefty's =

Store in California

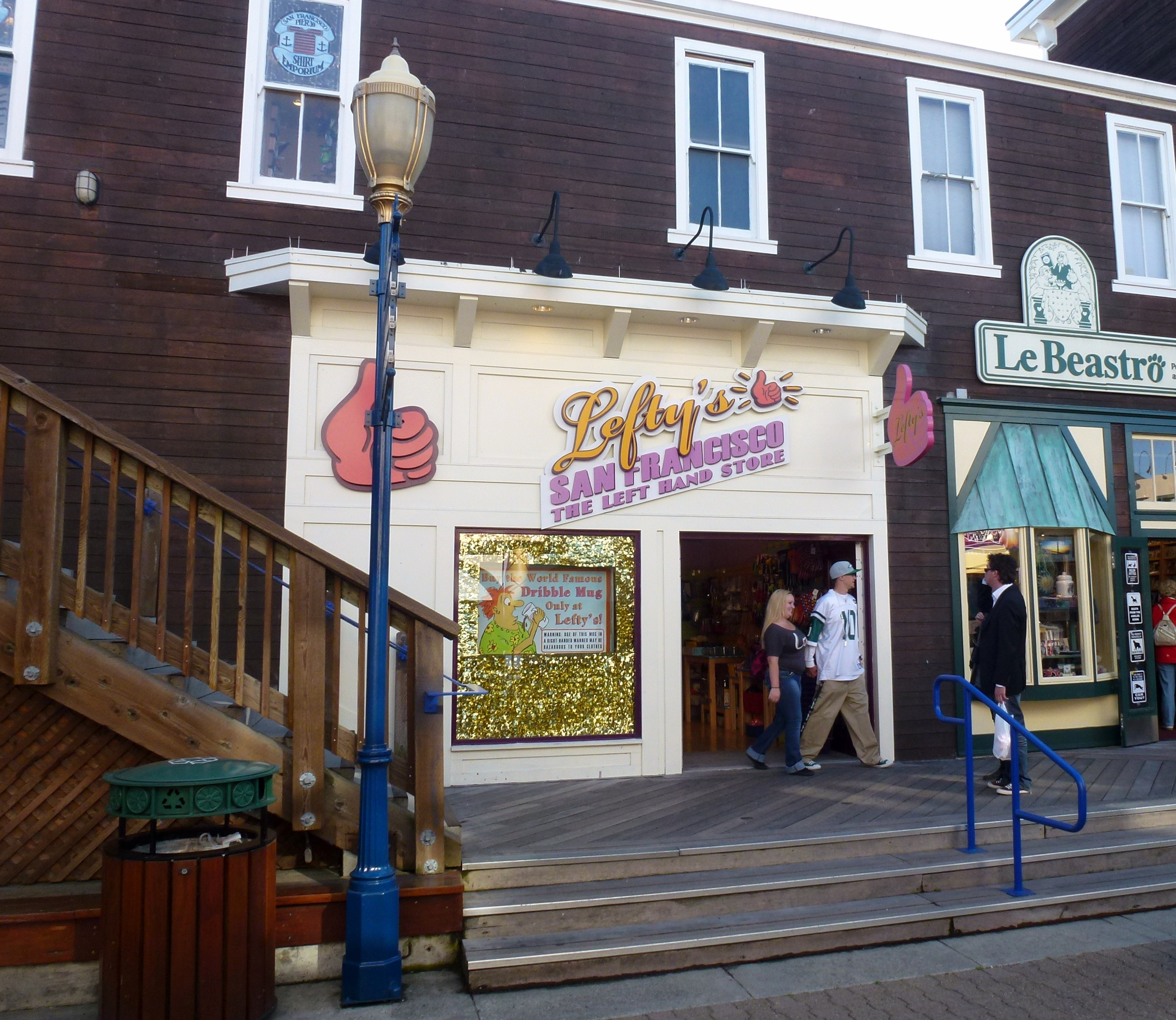

Lefty's is a retail store on Pier 39 in San Francisco, specializing in products for left-handed people. It was opened in 2008 by Margaret Majua. However, the history of a left-handed store on Pier 39 dates back to 1975, with the opening of Left-Hand World, which closed ten years later. The product line, all designed by Majua, include stationery products, such as notebooks with the binding on the right side, and a pen which allows left-handed writers to see what they had just written without smearing it; cooking utensils for the left hand; and clothing with slogans for left-handers. Lefty's, which sells its products both in-store and online, is one of just a few stores for left-handed people worldwide, and currently the oldest.
