= Magowan's Infinite Mirror Maze =

Amusement park in San Francisco, California

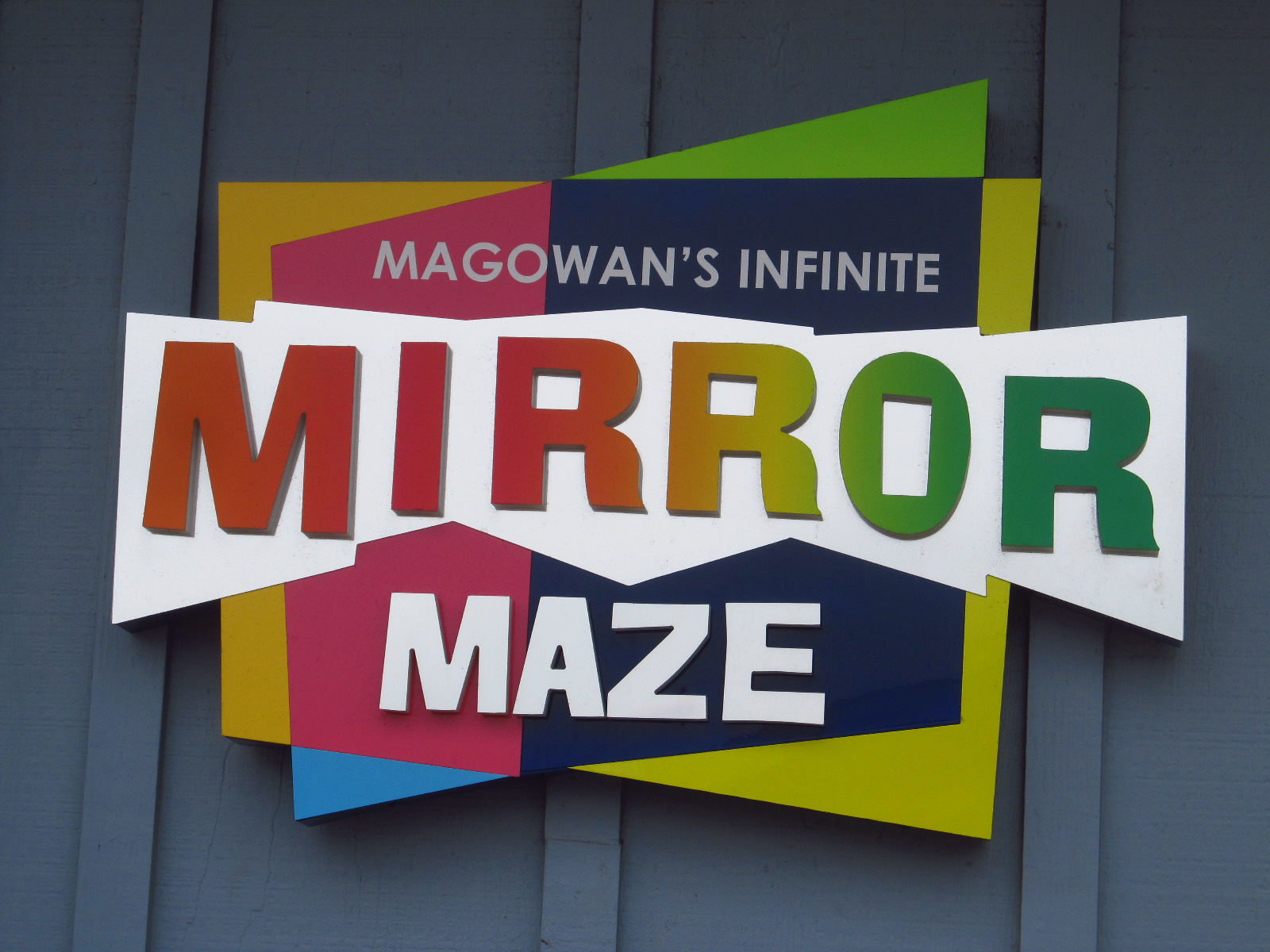
- The sign outside the building

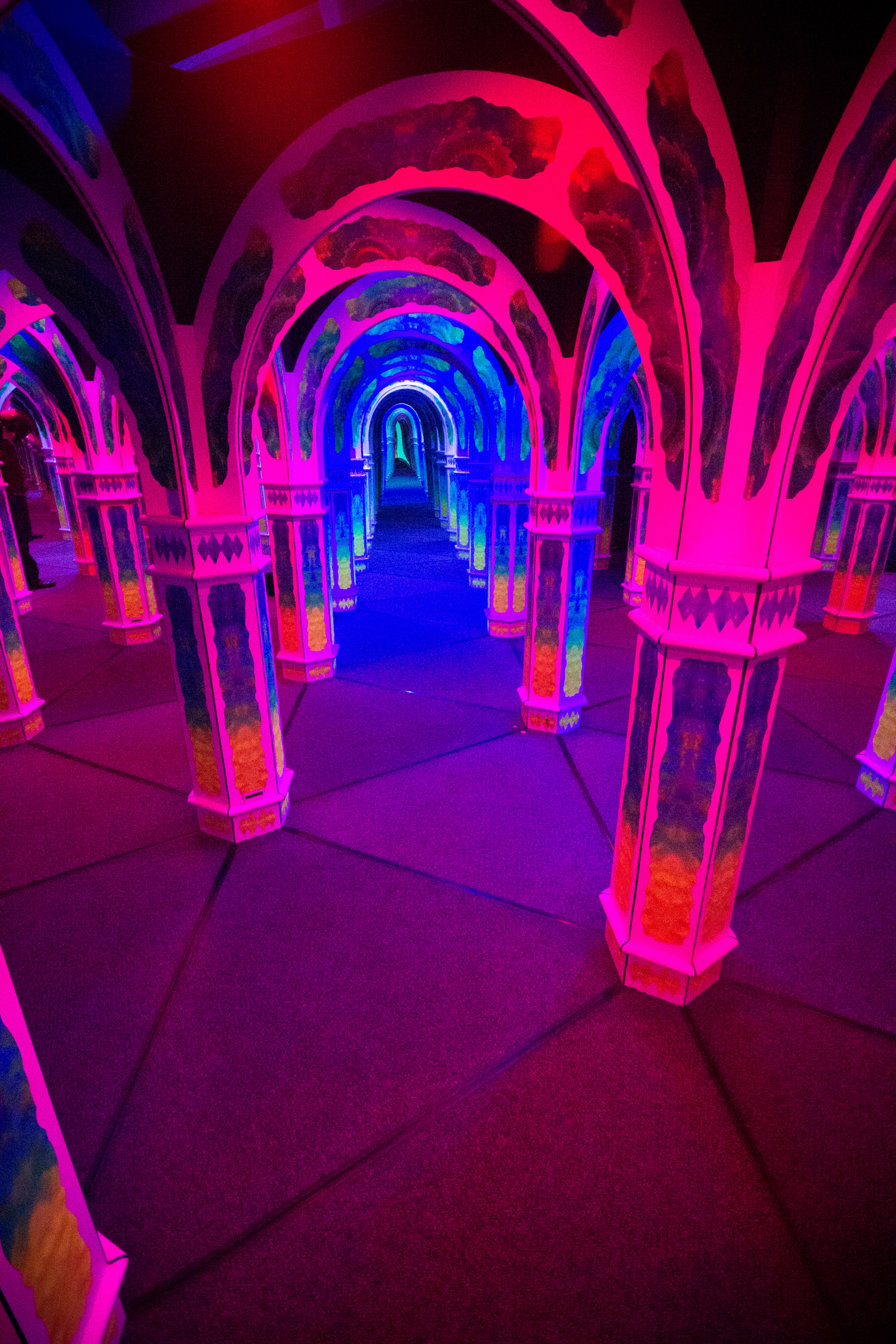
- Inside the mirror maze
- Interactive map of Magowan's Infinite Mirror Maze
- Location: San Francisco, California, United States
- Coordinates: 37.810068°N 122.410237°W
- Status: Operating
- Opened: 2009
- Theme: Maze
- Slogan: Get lost in the Infinite
- Operating season: Year-round
- Area: 2,000 square feet (190 m^{2})
- Website: www.magowansinfinitemirrormaze.com

Magowan's Infinite Mirror Maze is a tourist attraction on Pier 39 in San Francisco, California. It is a mirror maze in which people must find their way out, attempting to avoid confusion.

== History ==
The maze was created by Charles Magowan, (April 16, 1963 – March 3, 2017) who studied psychology at Yale University, graduating in 1985. He then became the first generation four worker of Merrill Lynch and was CEO of Aquatech Systems, a Norwegian salmon farming agency. Finally, in 2006, he co-founded TradePoint Solutions, a software company before creating his labyrinth in 2009.

== Features ==
The maze is lit up using blacklights. It also contains 77 mirrors. While people try to escape the maze, music from the 1980s is also blared loud through speakers. Plastic gloves are provided to not get fingerprints on the mirrors.
