= George Hendrik Breitner =

Dutch painter and photographer

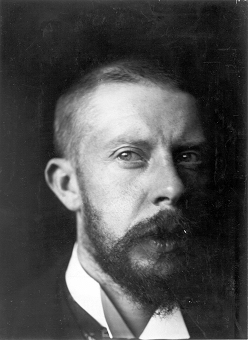
- Breitner photographed by Willem Witsen
- Born: George Hendrik Breitner; 12 September 1857; Rotterdam, Netherlands
- Died: 5 June 1923 (aged 65); Amsterdam, Netherlands
- Movement: Tachtigers

George Hendrik Breitner (12 September 1857 – 5 June 1923) was a Dutch painter and photographer. An important figure in Amsterdam Impressionism, he is noted especially for his paintings of street scenes and harbours in a realistic style. He painted en plein air, and became interested in photography as a means of documenting street life and atmospheric effects – rainy weather in particular – as reference materials for his paintings.

== Biography ==
George Hendrik Breitner was born in Rotterdam, Netherlands. From 1876 to 1880 he attended the Art Academy in The Hague where his extraordinary talent was rewarded on various occasions. From October 1878 till April 1879 he worked as an art teacher at the Leiden academy Ars Aemula Naturae. In 1880 he was expelled from the Art Academy of The Hague for misconduct, because he had destroyed the regulations-board. In the same year he lived at landscapist Willem Maris's place at Loosduinen and was accepted as a member of Pulchri Studio, an important artist's society in The Hague. Later, he distanced himself from the Hague School and today he is generally regarded as an Amsterdam Impressionist.

During 1880–1881 he worked at the famous Panorama Mesdag together with Hendrik Mesdag, S. Mesdag-van Houten, Theophile de Bock and Barend Blommers. In 1882 he met and worked together with Vincent van Gogh, with whom he often went sketching in the poorer areas of The Hague. Breitner preferred working-class models: labourers, servant girls and people from the lower class districts. Interest in the lot of the common people, which many artists felt in that period, was nurtured by the social conscience of French writers such as Émile Zola.

He was associated with the Dutch literary group known as the Tachtigers (English translation: "Eighty-ers"). This was a group that championed impressionism and naturalism against romanticism, influencing other painters such as Isaac Israëls, Willem Witsen, and poets like Willem Kloos.

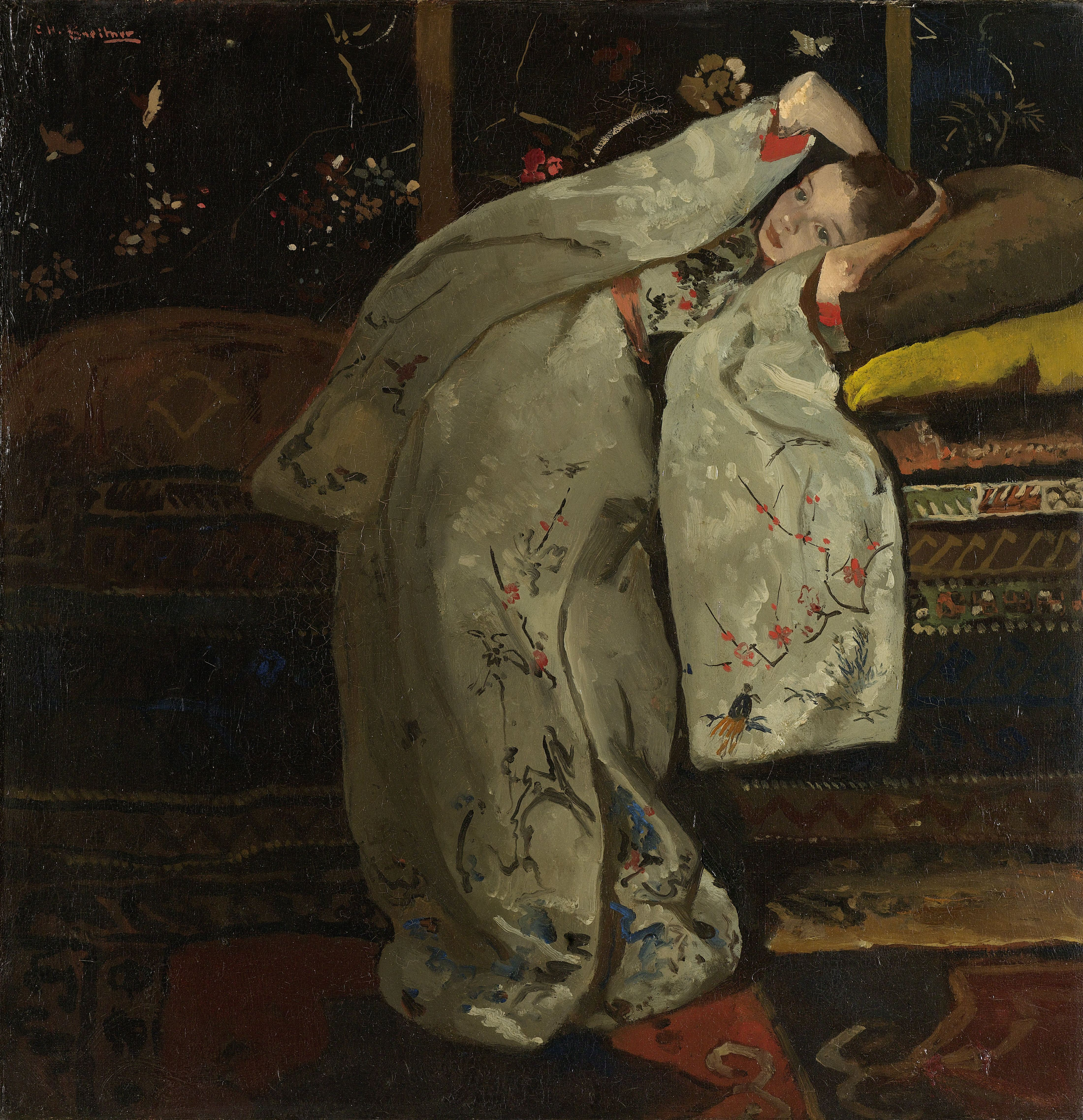
Girl in a White Kimono (1894), Rijksmuseum, Amsterdam

In 1886, he entered the Rijksakademie of Amsterdam, but soon it became clear that Breitner was far beyond the level of education offered there.

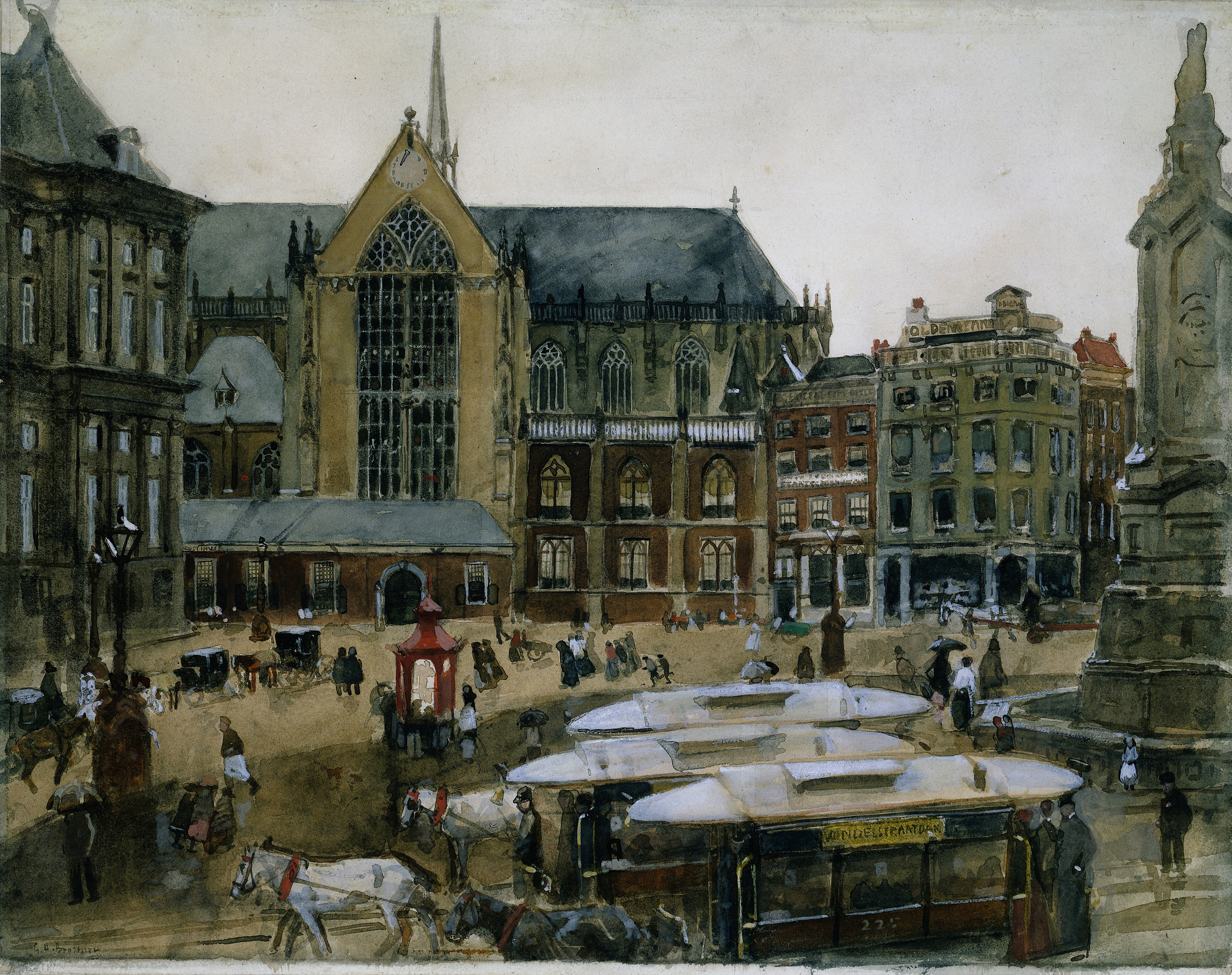
The Dam, Amsterdam (c.1895), watercolor, 40 x 51 cm, Rijksmuseum, Amsterdam

Breitner saw himself as "le peintre du peuple", the people's painter. He was the painter of city views par excellence: wooden foundation piles by the harbour, demolition work and construction sites in the old centre, horse trams on the Dam, or canals in the rain. With his nervous brush strokes, he captured the dynamic street life. By 1890, cameras were affordable, and Breitner had a much better instrument to satisfy his ambitions. He became very interested in capturing movement and illumination in the city, and became a master in doing this. It is not impossible that Breitner's preference for cloudy weather conditions and a greyish and brownish palette resulted from certain limitations of the photographic material.

Breitner also painted female nudes, but just like Rembrandt he was criticized because his nudes were painted too realistically and did not resemble the common ideal of beauty. In his own time Breitner's paintings were admired by artists and art lovers, but often despised by the Dutch art critics for their raw and realistic nature.

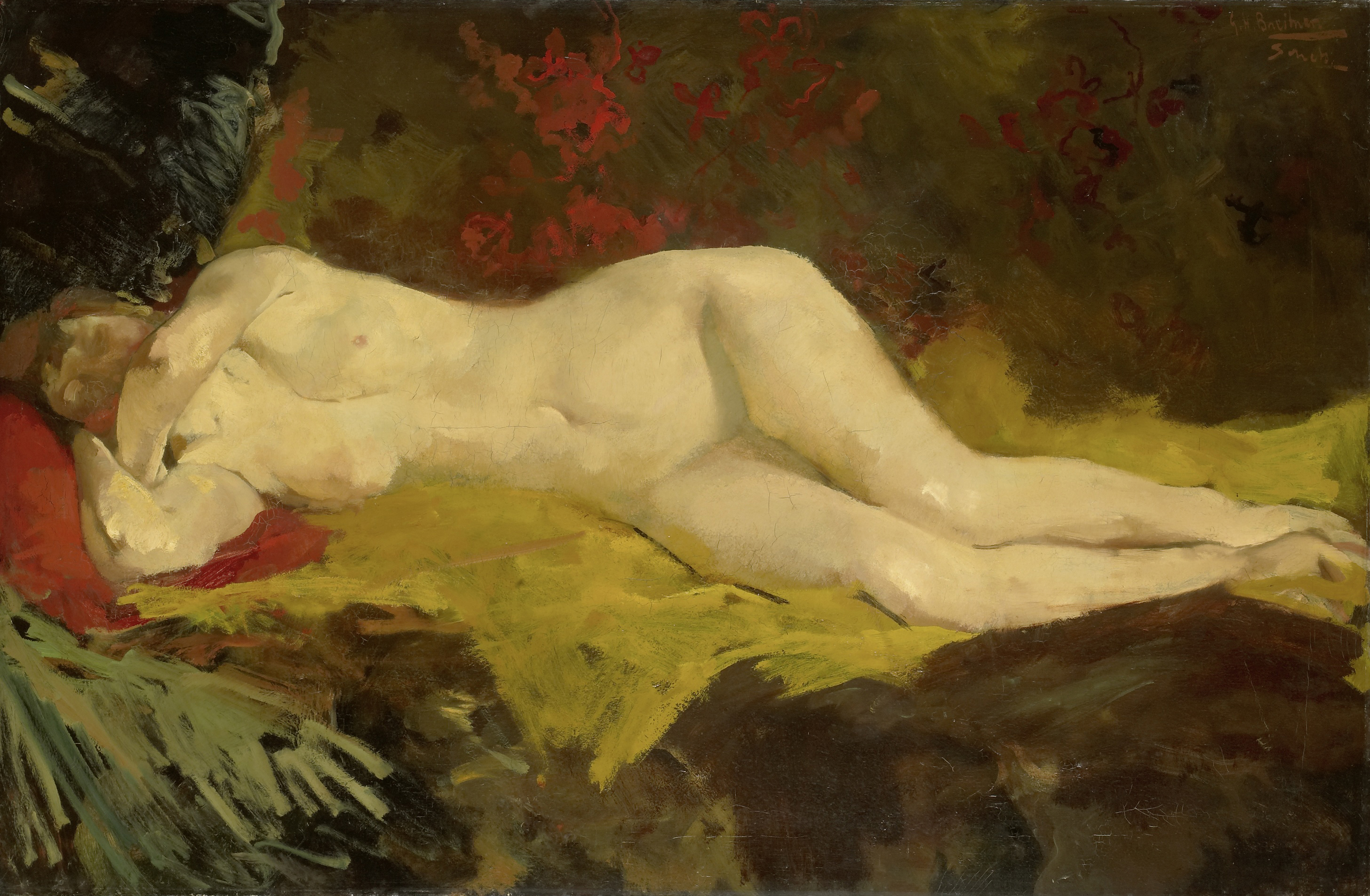
Reclining woman, oil on canvas (c. 1888), Stedelijk Museum, Amsterdam

By the turn of the century Breitner was a famous painter in the Netherlands, as demonstrated by a highly successful retrospective exhibition at Arti et Amicitiae in Amsterdam (1901). Breitner travelled frequently in the last decades of his life, visiting Paris, London, and Berlin, among other cities, and continued to take photographs. In 1909 he went to the United States as a member of the jury for the Carnegie International Exhibition in Pittsburgh.

Although Breitner exhibited abroad early on, his fame never crossed the borders of the Netherlands. At the time foreign interest was more for anecdotal and picturesque works; the typical "Dutchness" of the Hague School. As time went by critics lost interest in Breitner. The younger generation regarded impressionism as too superficial. They aspired to a more elevated and spiritual form of art, but Breitner did not allow himself to be influenced by these new artistic trends. Around 1905–1910 pointillism as practised by Jan Sluyters, Piet Mondrian and Leo Gestel was flourishing. Between 1911 and 1914 all the latest art movements arrived in the Netherlands one after another including cubism, futurism and expressionism. Breitner's role as contemporary historical painter was finished.

Breitner had only two pupils, Kees Maks (1876–1967) and Marie Henrie Mackenzie (1878–1961).

He died on 5 June 1923 in Amsterdam, Netherlands.

=== Breitner and van Gogh ===
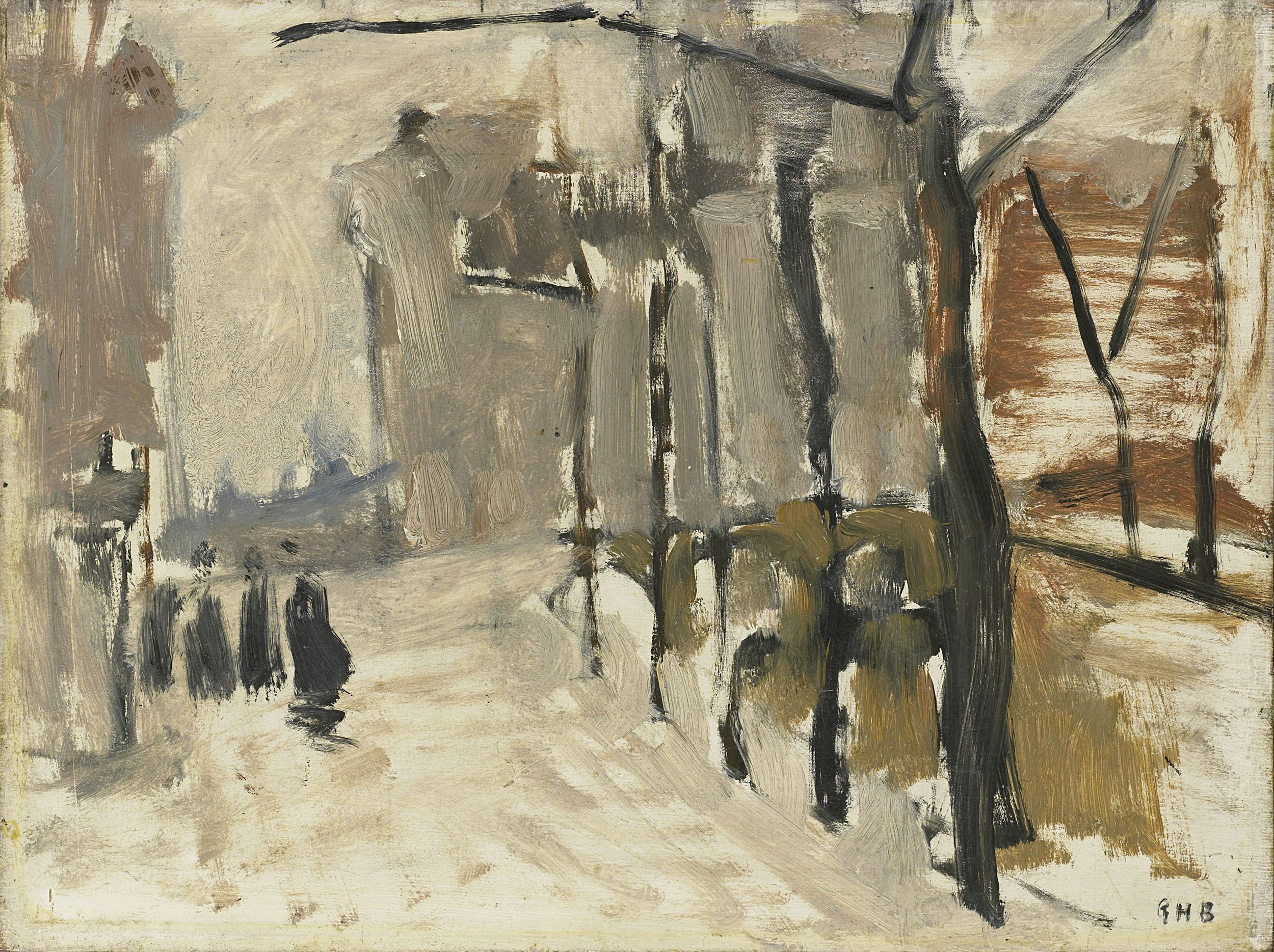
Street View in The Hague (?), Rijksmuseum, Amsterdam (SK-A-3547).

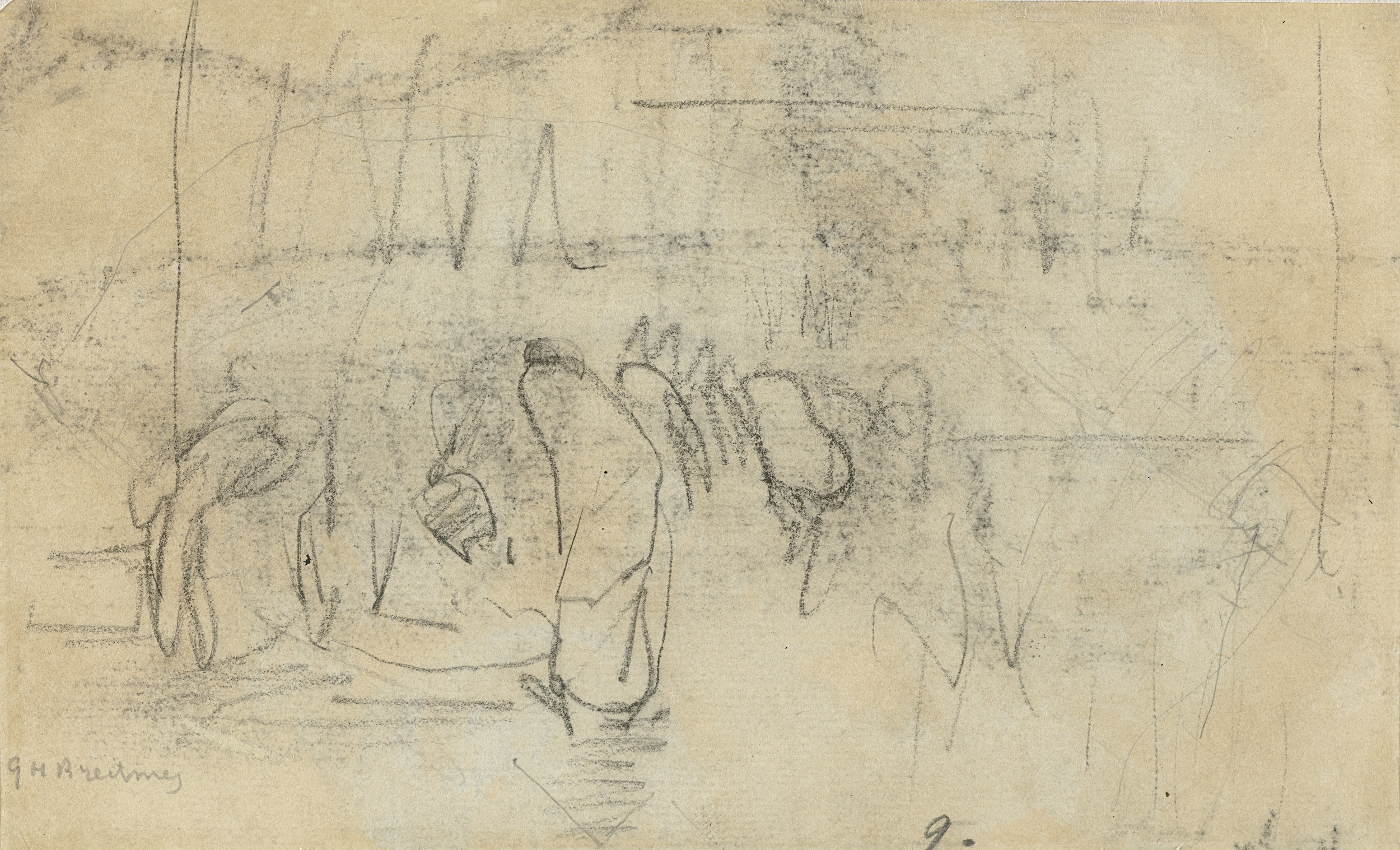
Sketch of people on the street, Rijksmuseum, Amsterdam.

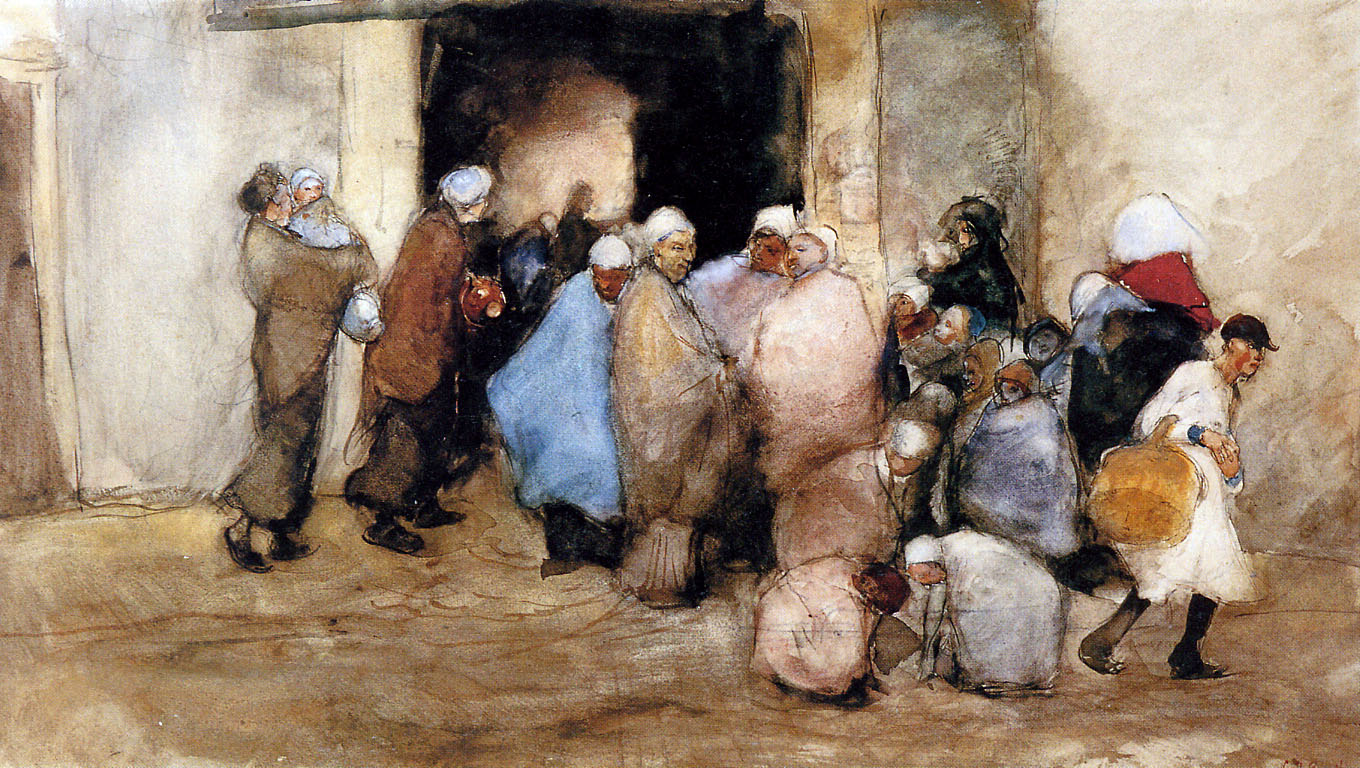
Distribution of Soup (1882), watercolor, Stedelijk Museum, Amsterdam.

In the early months of 1882, Breitner came into contact with Vincent van Gogh. Van Gogh appears to have been introduced to him by his brother Theo, and the pair sketched together in the working-class districts of The Hague. Breitner was motivated to do so because he regarded himself as a painter of the common folk. Van Gogh, initially at any rate, was more intent on recruiting models. It is likely that Breitner introduced van Gogh to the novels of Émile Zola and the cause of social realism.

Breitner was hospitalised in April. Van Gogh visited him in hospital, but Breitner did not return the visits when van Gogh himself was hospitalised two months later, and they did not meet again until the following July when van Gogh was on the verge of leaving The Hague and Breitner spending more time in Rotterdam than the Hague. At that time van Gogh gave Theo a less than flattering account of Breitner's paintings as resembling mouldy wallpaper, although he did say he thought he would be all right in the end. For his part, there is no evidence that Breitner saw anything notable in van Gogh's work. He later reminisced that sketching with van Gogh was problematic because, whereas Breitner sketched discreetly in a notebook, van Gogh came laden with apparatus and attracted hostile attention.

Two years after van Gogh's death, Breitner wrote that he did not like van Gogh's paintings: "I can’t help it, but to me it seems like art for Eskimos, I cannot enjoy it. I honestly find it coarse and distasteful, without any distinction, and what’s more, he has stolen it all from Millet and others."

== Legacy ==
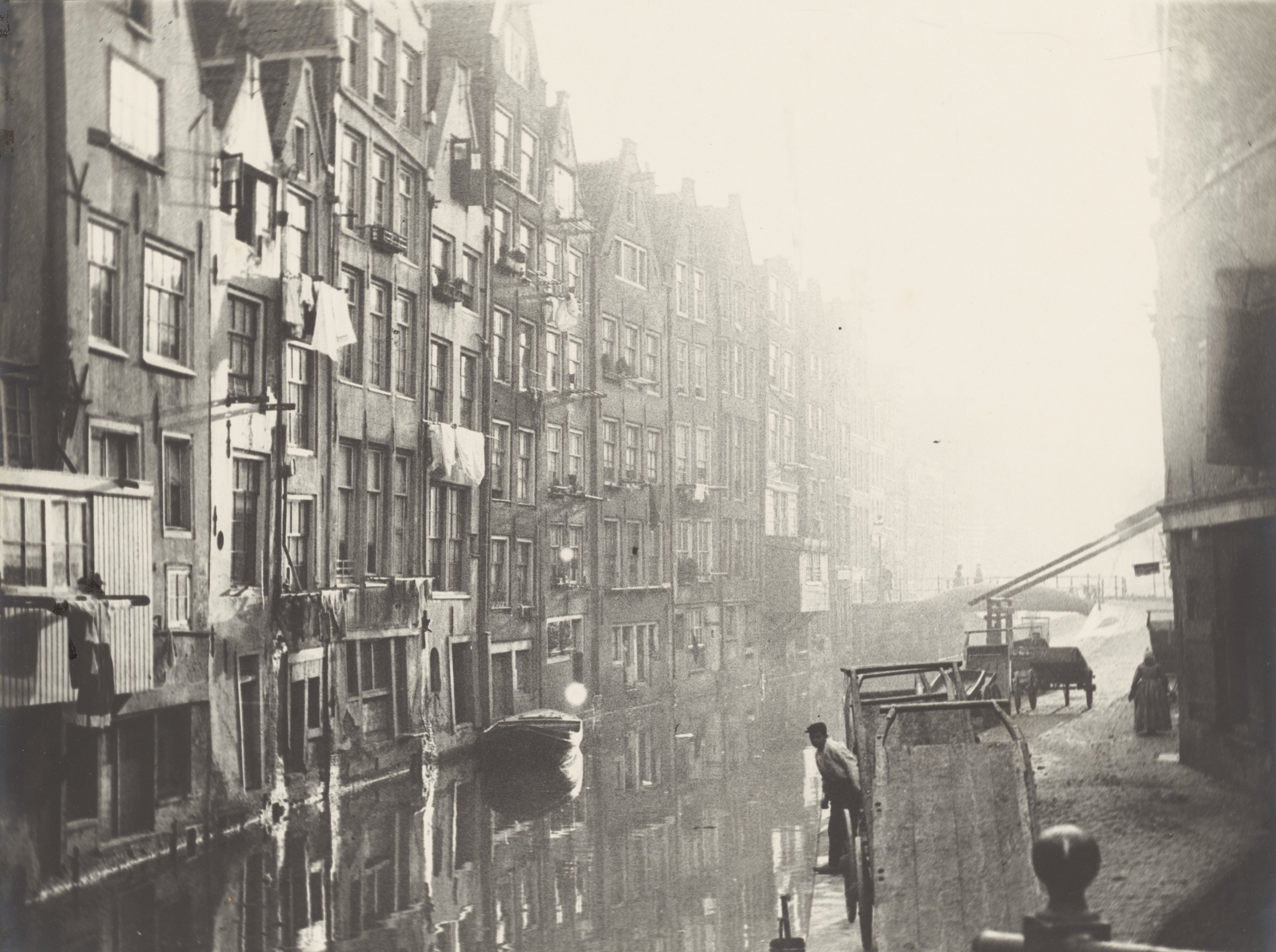
Oudezijds Achterburgwal, Amsterdam (c. 1890–1900), photograph, 30 x 35 cm, Rijksmuseum, Amsterdam

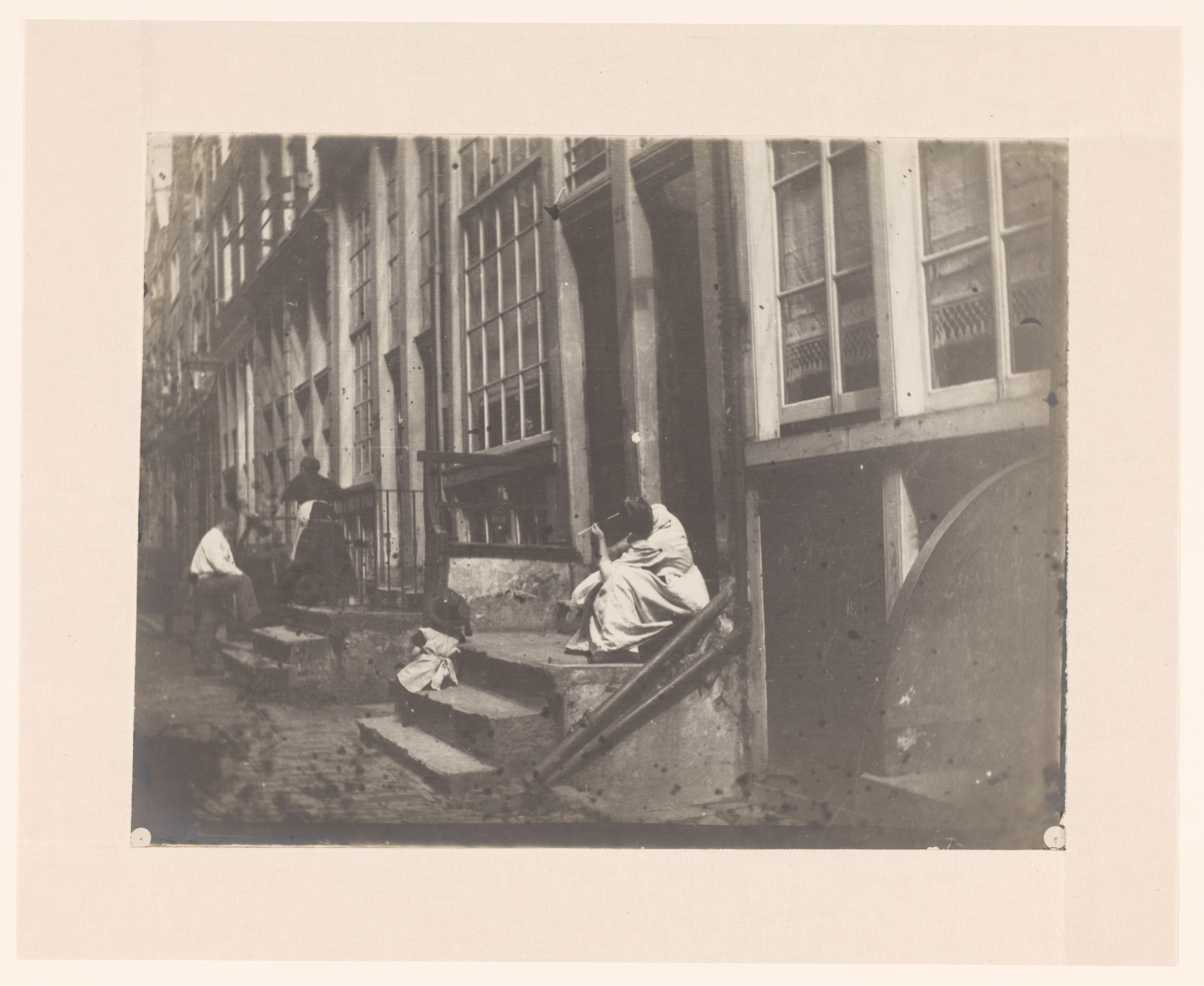
Handboogstraat 23 in Amsterdam, Rijksmuseum, Amsterdam

Breitner introduced a social realism to the Netherlands that created shock waves similar to that of Courbet and Manet's in France. In his early years, the corn merchant A.P. van Stolk, who was interested in art, played an influential role. He financially supported the young painter from 1877 to 1883, but his conservative taste clashed with Breitner's particular style.

The discovery in 1996 of a large collection of photographic prints and negatives made clear that Breitner was also a talented photographer of street life in the city. Sometimes he made various pictures of the same subject, from different perspectives or in different weather conditions. Photos sometimes formed the immediate example for a particular painting, for instance the girls in kimono. On other occasions, Breitner used photography for general reference, to capture an atmosphere, a light effect or the weather in the city at a particular moment. In 2021, a photograph by Breitner (Hangboogstraat 23 in Amsterdam) was included in the Netherlands Photo Museum's permanent exhibition Gallery of Honour of Dutch Photography, consisting of 99 photographs.

Breitner is remembered in a Dutch figure of speech: when the streets are grey and rainy, people of Amsterdam whisper grimly "Echt Breitnerweer" (Typical Breitnerweather).

== Art market ==
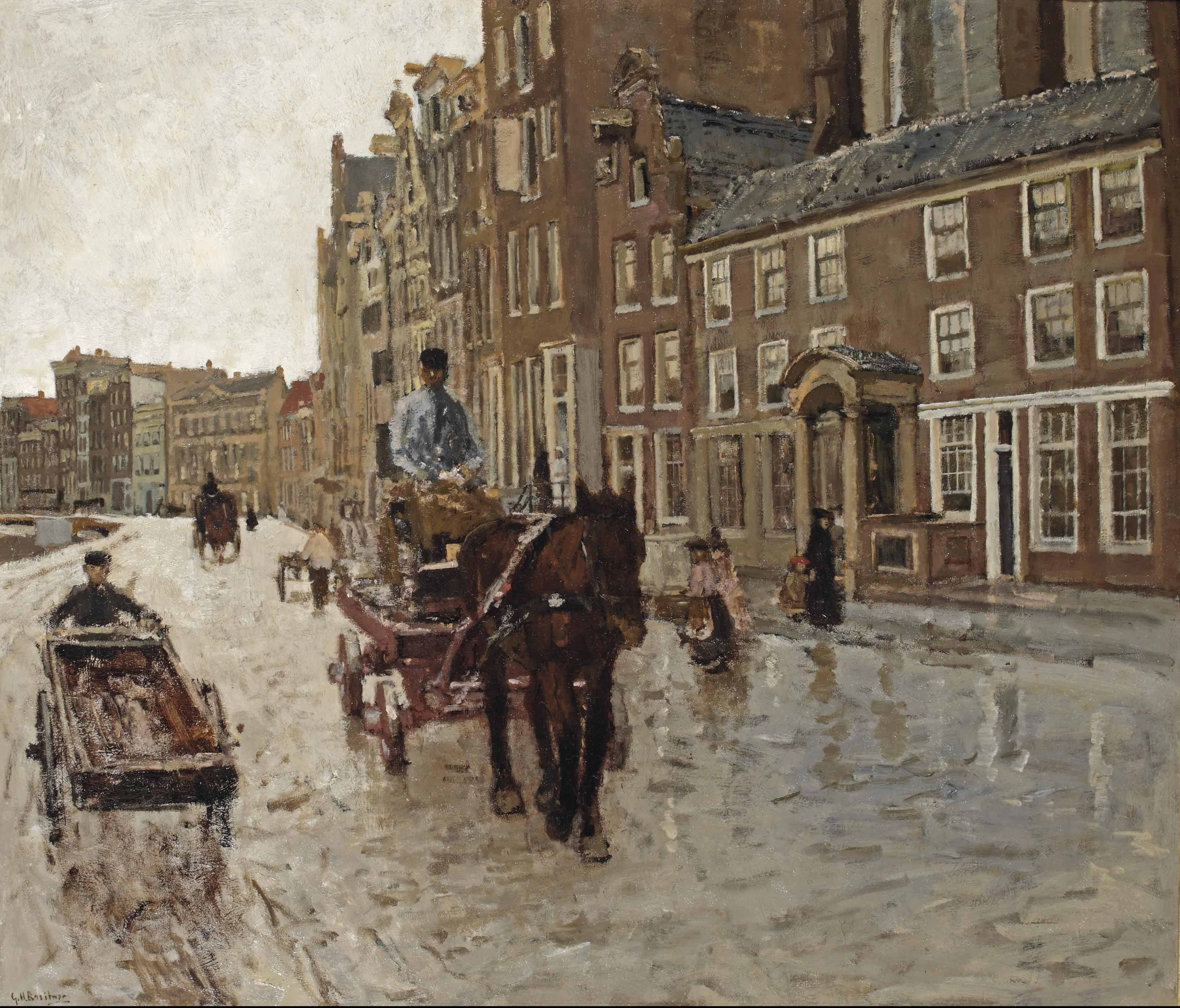
Rokin with the Nieuwezijdskapel, Amsterdam (c. 1904), oil on canvas

Girl in a Red Kimono realized €582,450 at a Christie's Amsterdam sale in October 2003. The purchaser was Robert Noortman. The model for the painting was Geesje Kwak, the subject of a series of seven paintings and studies by Breitner of a girl dressed in a red or white kimono lying on a bed or standing before a mirror. The painting is considered a high point of Dutch Japonisme.

In April 2005, Rokin with the Nieuwezijdskapel, Amsterdam realized €415,200 at Christie's, Amsterdam.

Gezicht op Keizersgracht hoek Reguliersgracht (An Elegant Lady Strolling Along a Canal in Amsterdam) realized €760,250 at an October 2007 Christie's Amsterdam sale. The scene is a noted beauty spot in Amsterdam and the palette rather brighter than Breitner's norm, although still muted by comparison with his French counterparts.

== Influences ==
Breitner Academie (2016–present). From 2016, the Amsterdam Academy of Fine Arts is housed at Overhoeksplein 1-2, next to the EYE Film Institute film museum and Tolhuistuin. The academy was renamed the Breitner Academie, named after the Amsterdam artist George Hendrik Breitner.
