= Quack =

Quack, The Quack or Quacks may refer to:

== People ==
- Quack Davis, American baseball player
- Hendrick Peter Godfried Quack (1834–1917), Dutch economist and historian
- Joachim Friedrich Quack (born 1966), German Egyptologist
- Johannes Quack (born 1959), German ethnologist
- Martin Quack (born 1948), German physical chemist
- Niels Quack (born 1980), Swiss and German engineer
- Sigrid Quack (born 1958), German social scientist

== Film and television ==
- Quacks (TV series), a British comedy series about quackery
- O. K. Quack, a character in the Scrooge McDuck universe
- Quack, a duck in Peep and the Big Wide World, a children's TV series
- Quack, a character in Zack & Quack, an animated television series

== Music ==
- KWAX, a classical FM radio service of the University of Oregon
- Quack (album), an album by the American-Canadian group Duck Sauce
- The Quack (EP), a 2013 album by Australian electronic music project What So Not

== Sport and games ==
- Quack (horse) (1969–1995), an American Thoroughbred racehorse
- The Quack (horse), a 19th-century Australian Thoroughbred racehorse
- The Quacks of Quedlinburg, a bag-building, push-your-luck board game, affectionately known as "Quacks" for short, designed by Wolfgang Warsch.
- Quack, a portmanteau of queen and jack; see Glossary of contract bridge terms § Q

== Other uses ==
- Quack (medicine), a person who practices quackery, the promotion of unproven or fraudulent medical practices
- Quack (sound), onomatopoeia for the sound made by ducks
- Quack grass (Elymus repens), a species of grass
- Quack.com, a company based in Silicon Valley
