= Pier 39 =

Shopping center and popular tourist attraction on a pier in San Francisco, California

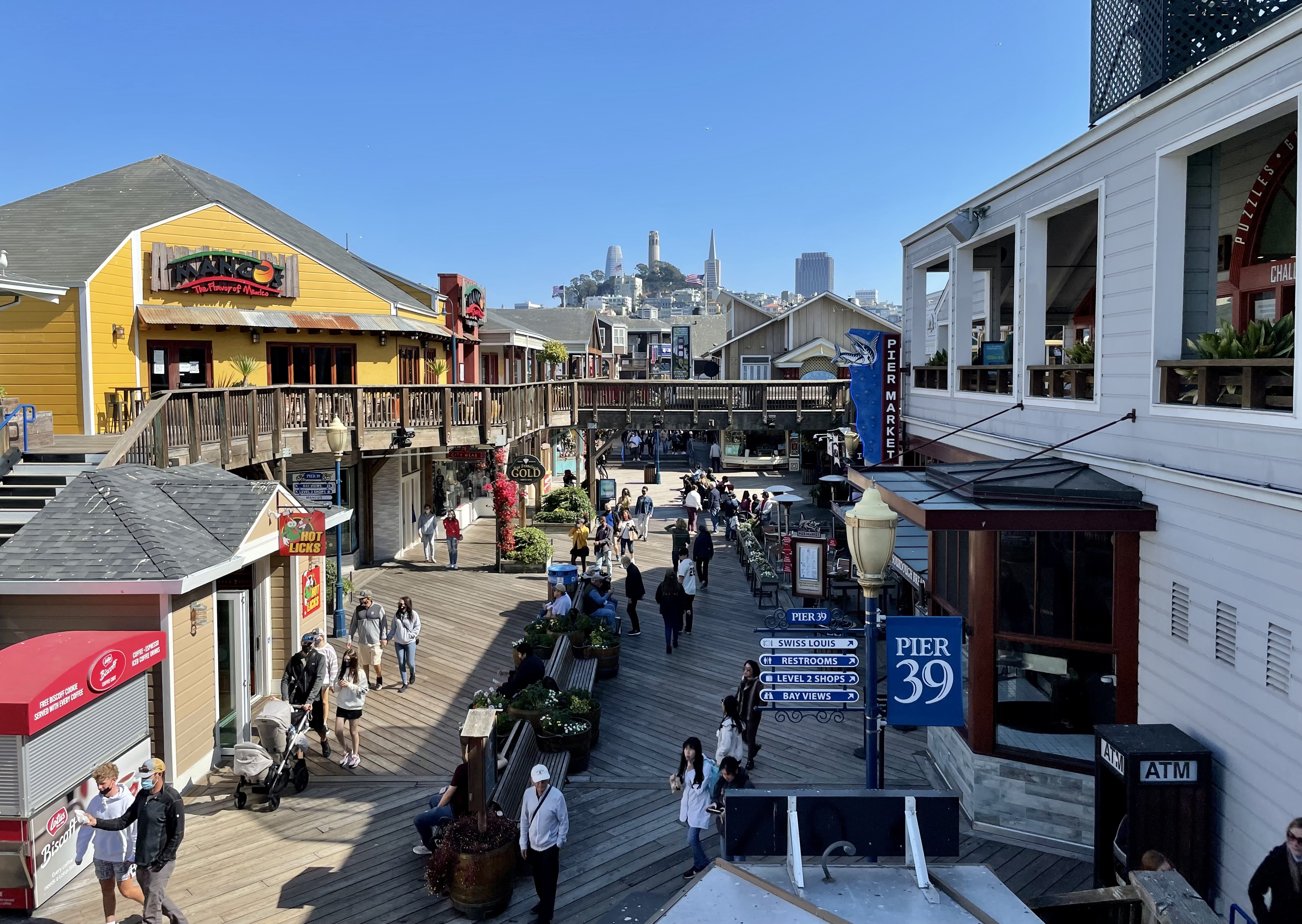
- View of Pier 39

- Location within San Francisco

General information
- Type: Shopping center
- Location: San Francisco
- Coordinates: 37.8100°N 122.4104°W

Other information
- Public transit: The Embarcadero and Stockton station

Pier 39 is a shopping center and popular tourist attraction built on a pier in San Francisco, California. At Pier 39, there are shops, restaurants, a video arcade, street performances, the Aquarium of the Bay, virtual 3D rides, and views of California sea lions hauled out on docks on Pier 39's marina. A two-story carousel is one of the pier's more dominant features, although it is not directly visible from the street and sits towards the end of the pier. The family-oriented entertainment and presence of marine mammals make this a popular tourist location for families with kids.

The pier is located at the edge of the Fisherman's Wharf district and is close to North Beach, Chinatown, and the Embarcadero. The area is easily accessible with the historic F Market streetcars. Attractions include Kwak, a store selling only rubber ducks, and Magowan's Infinite Mirror Maze.

From the pier one can see Angel Island, Alcatraz Island, the Golden Gate Bridge, and the Bay Bridge. Blue & Gold Fleet's bay cruises leave from Pier 39.

== History ==
Pier 39 was first developed by entrepreneur Warren Simmons and opened October 4, 1978.

=== Sea lions ===
A colony of California sea lions first began hauling-out on Pier 39 in September 1989. Before that they mostly used Seal Rock for that purpose. Ever since September 1989 the number of sea lions on Seal Rock has been steadily decreasing, while their number on Pier 39 has generally increased. Some people speculate that sea lions moved to docks because of the 1989 Loma Prieta earthquake, but the earthquake happened after the first sea lions arrived at Pier 39. It is likely that the sea lions feel safer inside the Bay.

The Bay Ecotarium/Bay.org (501c-3) non-profit watershed conservation group in the Bay Area, operates the Sea Lion Center as an extended education arm of the Aquarium of the Bay on Pier #39. Naturalists and education staff interact with visitors and school groups with programs and demonstration activities.

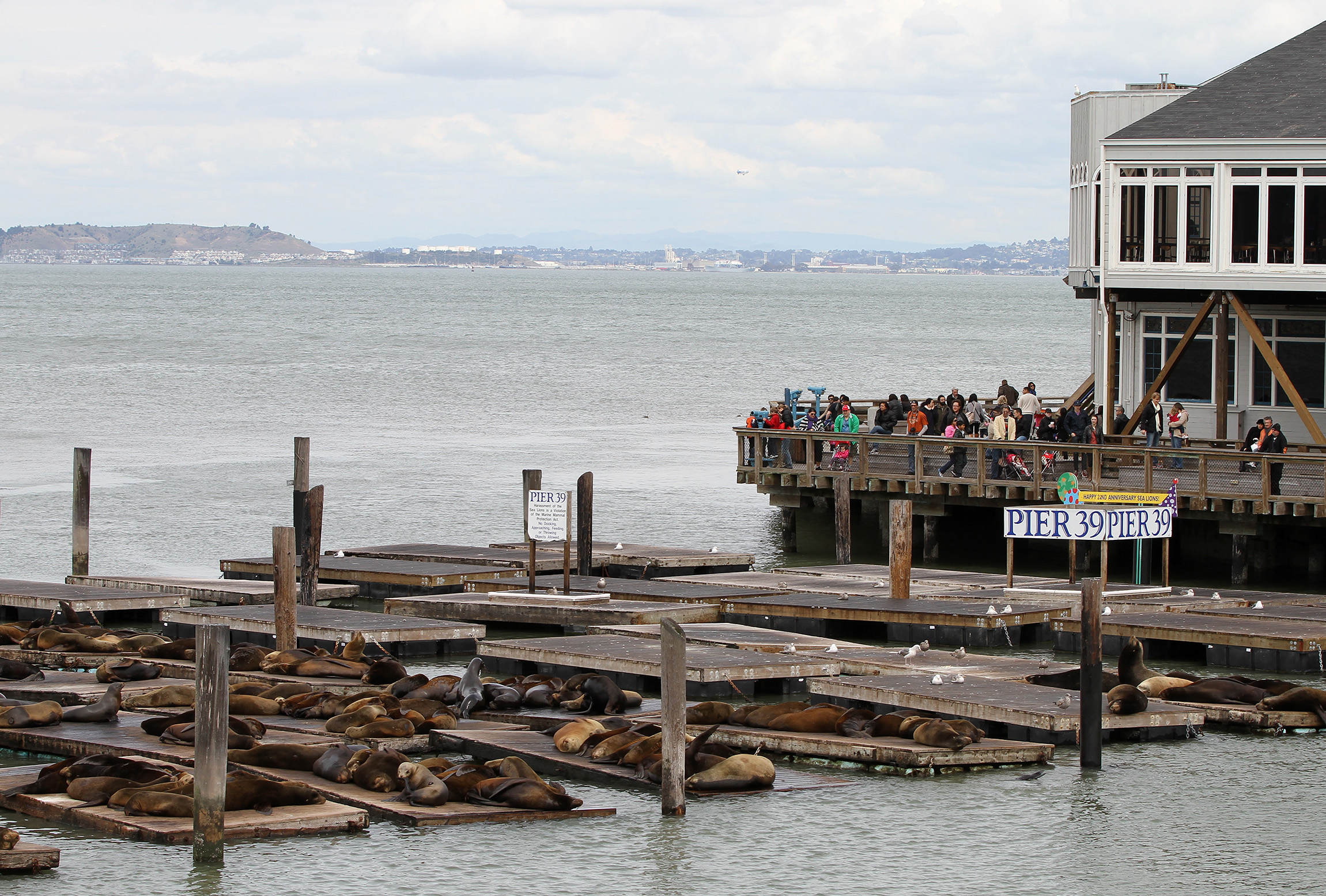
The sea lions at Pier 39 have become a tourist attraction in their own right

Although the reason for their migration to the pier is unclear, the refurbishing of the docks in September 1989 required the removal of all boats from that area, leaving large open spaces for the sea lions to move into. Once the project was completed, boat owners returned, but did their best to navigate around the sea lions; no efforts were made to encourage the new guests to leave. By the end of that year, fewer than a dozen sea lions frequented the docks at Pier 39. By January 1990, their numbers had increased to 150 animals. Owners of the 11 boats docked there began to complain about having to avoid the animals who can weigh up to half a ton, and odor and noise complaints began to pour in. News coverage caught national attention, and the sea lions began to attract tourists. Advice from The Marine Mammal Center was to abandon the docks to the animals, and to relocate the boats elsewhere.

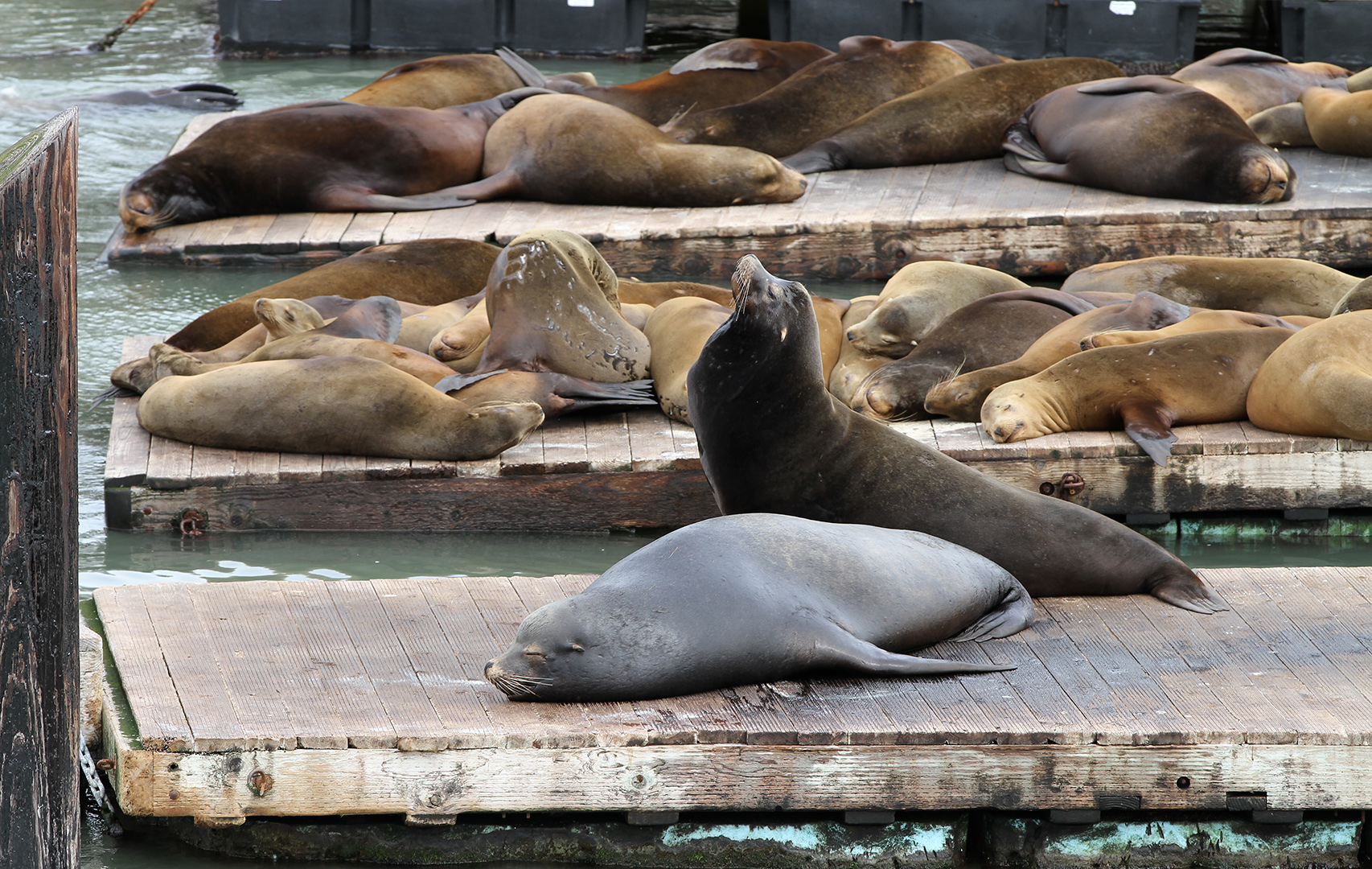
Sea lions on Pier 39

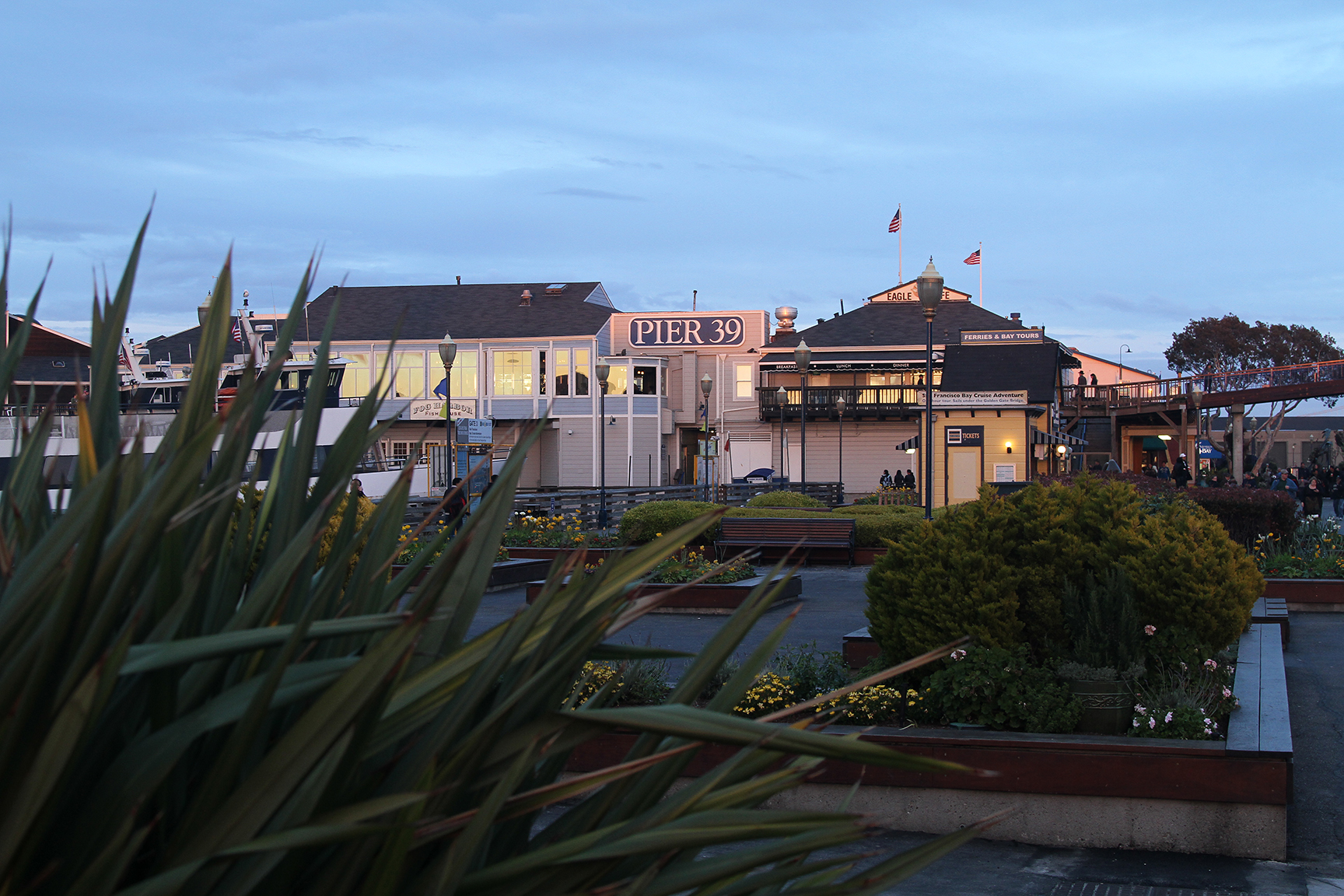
Pier 39 and the Pier 39 sign

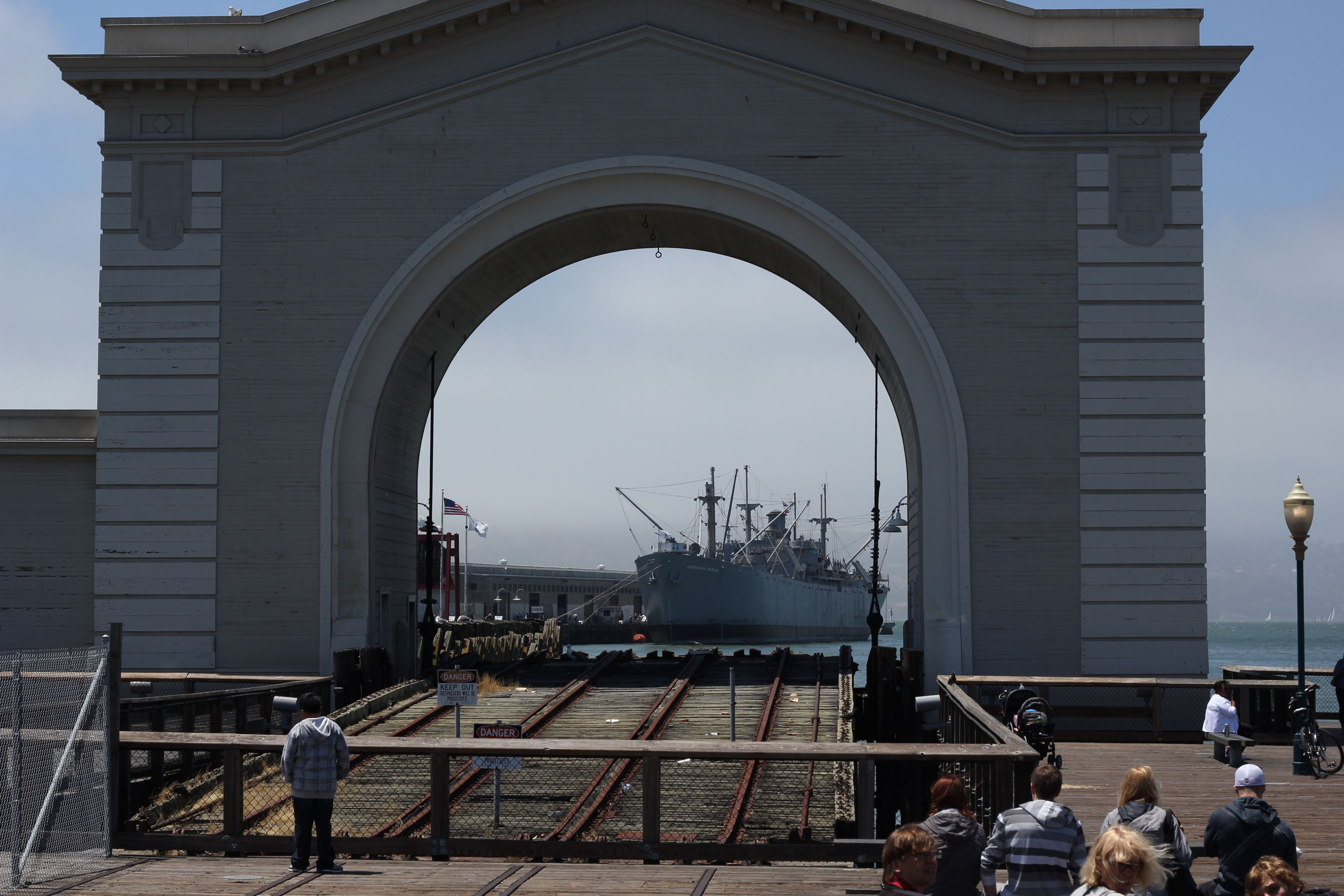
Old Port Gate

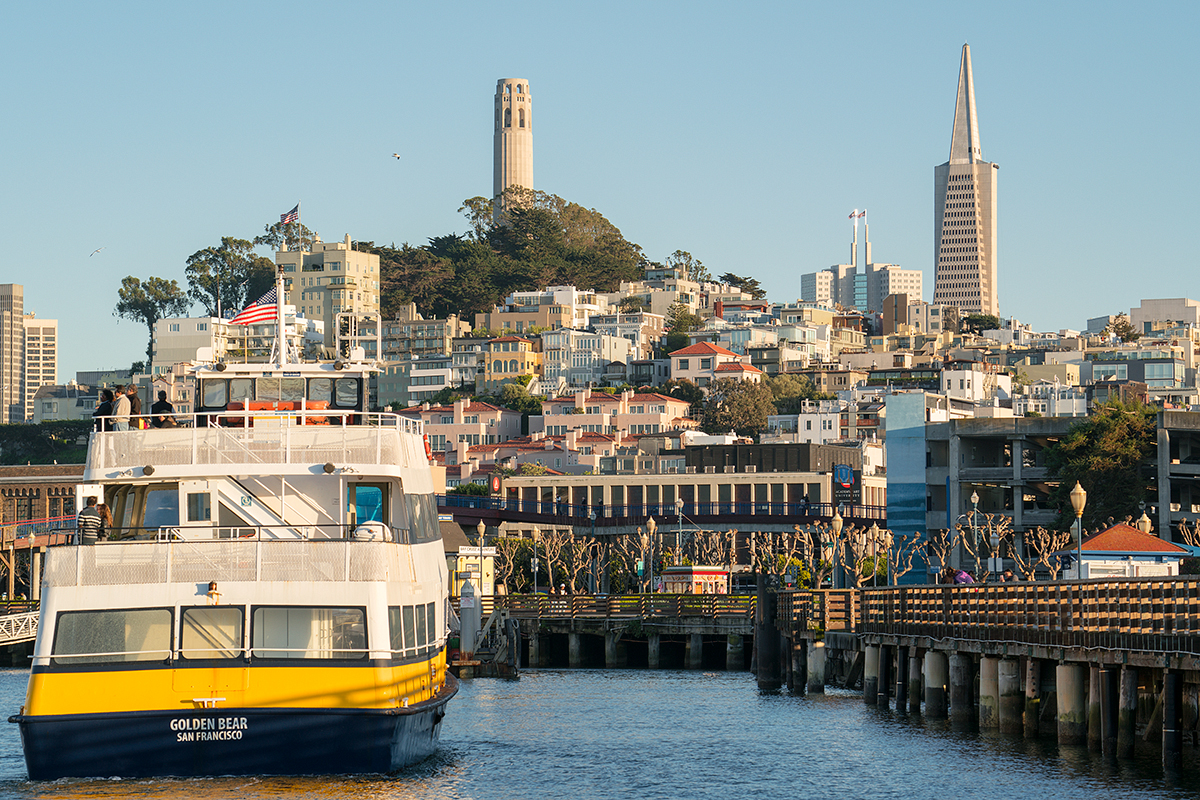
San Francisco from Forbes Island, pier 39

Although fluctuations in the number of sea lions at Pier 39 are dramatic, as many as 1,700 have been officially reported at one time (Thanksgiving week in 2009), many of whom are recognizable to researchers and others, and some of whom have been unofficially named. Volunteers and staff at The Marine Mammal Store and Interpretive Center monitor the sea lion population each day, and educational information is provided to tourists who visit from around the world. Scientists continue to collect information there, adding to knowledge about sea lion health, dietary habits, and behavior. In November 2009, the more than 1,700 sea lions that had lived at the pier began to leave, and by late December 2009 nearly all were gone; a similar flux in population occurs annually, with the animals returning in the spring. Although the reason for their seasonal appearance and departure is not known for certain, according to Jeff Boehm, executive director of the Marine Mammal Center in Sausalito, "Most likely, they left chasing a food source," anchovies and sardines. A handful of sea lions did return in February, and by late May several hundred could once again be seen on Pier 39. It remains unknown exactly where they went and why. However, in December 2009, nearly 4,000 sea lions that were identified as members of the California sub-species were seen outside Oregon's Sea Lion Caves, suggesting that they were likely the sea lions from Pier 39.

In early 2017, the estimated number of seals ranged from 150 to 600 around the pier. In June and July however, most were expected to leave temporarily for their breeding grounds near the Channel Islands. That number has rapidly increased since the pandemic, with a maximum of 1,100 to 1,200 sea lions being reported on the pier as of May 2024.

=== Notable events ===
On December 22, 2017, the Federal Bureau of Investigation arrested Everitt Aaron Jameson, a 25-year-old former Marine, on suspicion of planning a terrorist attack in the Pier 39 area over Christmas.

== See also ==
- 49-Mile Scenic Drive
- The World Famous Bushman
- Chonkers
