= Niels Quack =

Swiss and German engineer

Professor Niels Quack
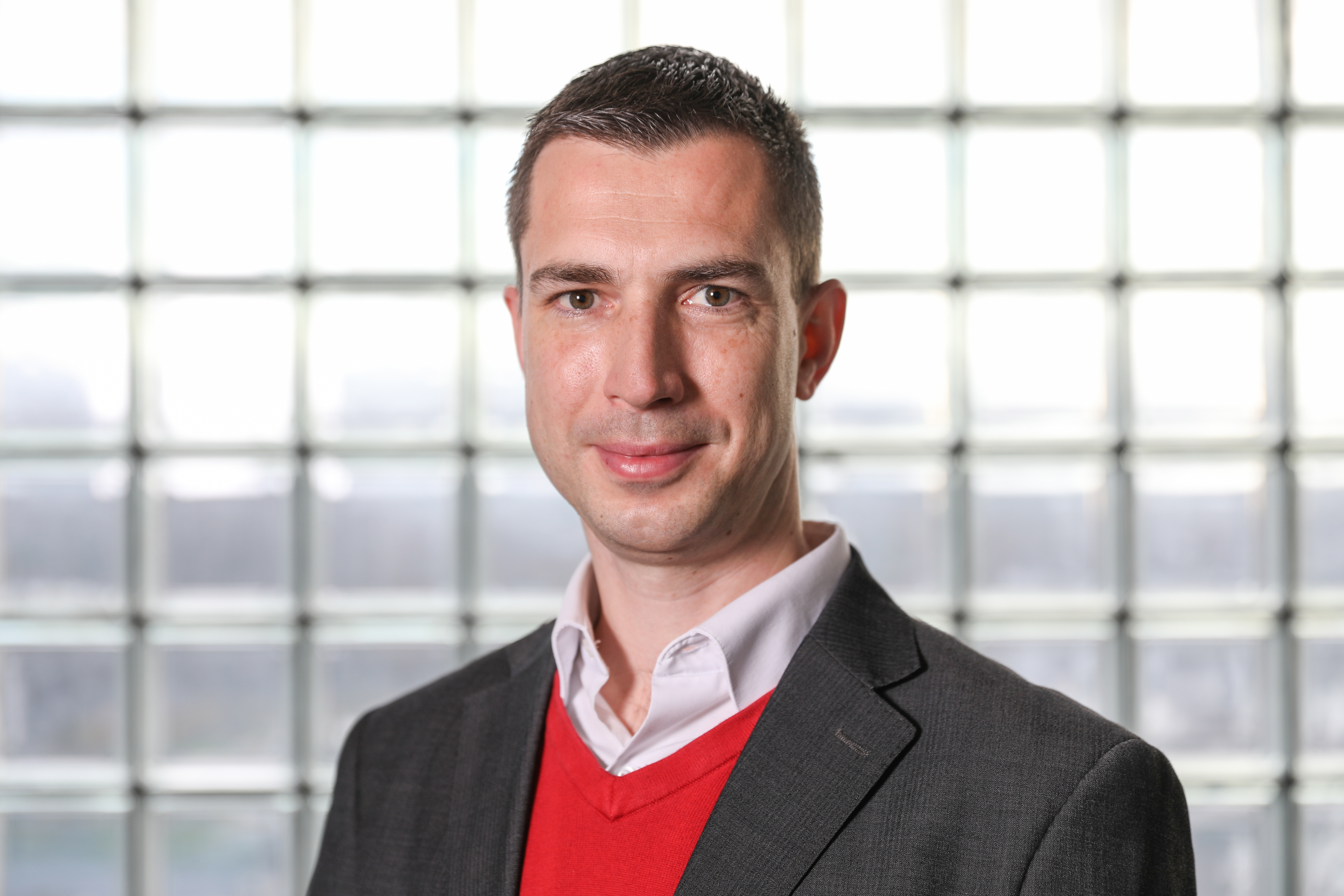
- Niels Quack in 2020
- Born: 1980 (age 45–46)
- Known for: Photonic MEMS; Diamond photonics
- Parent: Martin Quack

Academic background
- Education: Engineering
- Alma mater: EPFL; ETH Zurich
- Thesis: Micromirrors for integrated tunable mid-infrared detectors and emitters (2010) (2010)
- Doctoral advisor: Jürg Dual
- Other advisor: Ming C. Wu

Academic work
- Discipline: Engineering
- Sub-discipline: Microengineering
- Institutions: IMS CHIPS, University of Stuttgart and The University of Sydney
- Main interests: Micro- and Nanosystems; Micro- and Nanofabrication; Photonic MEMS; Diamond Photonics
- Website: https://www.ims-chips.com/

Niels Quack (born 1980 in Göttingen) is a Swiss and German engineer specialized in micro- and nanosystems engineering. He is the Managing Director at the Institut für Mikroelektronik Stuttgart (IMS CHIPS) as well as Professor at the University of Stuttgart.

== Career ==
Quack studied engineering at EPFL and received his master's degree in 2005. He then joined Jürg Dual's Institute for Mechanical Systems at ETH Zurich as a PhD student and graduated in 2010 with a thesis on "Micromirrors for integrated tunable mid-infrared detectors and emitters." In 2011, he went to work as a postdoctoral researcher at Ming C. Wu's Integrated Photonics Laboratory at University of California, Berkeley. From 2014 to 2015, he was senior microelectromechanical systems engineer with Sercalo Microtechnology Inc.

From 2015 to 2022, he has been an SNSF Assistant Professor with the EPFL, and head of the Photonic Micro- and Nanosystems Laboratory at its school of engineering.

In addition to his work in Switzerland, Quack has also held several academic leadership positions at the University of Sydney. From 2022 to 2025, he has served as Associate Professor in Micro- and Nanosystems at the School of Aerospace, Mechanical and Mechatronic Engineering within the Faculty of Engineering. Between 2024 and 2025, he was also Director of the Research & Prototype Foundry, part of the university's Core Research Facilities within the Research Portfolio. Since 2025, he holds an Honorary Professor Position at the Faculty of Engineering.

Since April 2025, he is professor at the University of Stuttgart and serves as the Managing Director of IMS CHIPS.

== Research ==
The research interests of Quack include Micro- and Nanosystems Engineering for integrated transducers with a focus on diamond photonics and silicon photonic microelectromechanical systems (MEMS), photonic switches and tunable optical microsystems. They find application in information and communication technologies, and emerging fields such as quantum information and artificial intelligence.

Quack's research has been featured in several international news outlet's such as Swissinfo, Phys.org, Bilan, and Laser Focus World. His research is also introduced in online videos such as the OSA stories and the H2020 Morphic Project.

In November 2024, Quack received a grant to research "Hybrid Integration: Advancing Semiconductors, Quantum and Photonics" from the Australian Research Council under the Linkage Infrastructure, Equipment and Facilities (LIEF) scheme.

== Distinctions ==
Quack has been an associate editor Journal of Optical Microsystems, Journal of Micro/Nanolithography, MEMS, and MOEMS (JM^{3}), and Journal of Microelectromechanical Systems. He has been a steering committee member of the IEEE International Conference on Optical MEMS and Nanophotonics (OMN), and served as general chair of the IEEE OMN 2018 and the Latsis Symposium 2019 on Diamond Photonics.

He is a senior member of IEEE, a senior member of Optica, and a Fellow of SPIE.

He is the recipient of the Outstanding Paper Award by Nature Microsystems & Nanoengineering 2020.

In 2023, he was named Supervisor of the Year by the Sydney University Postgraduate Representative Association. In 2024, he was honored as one of the Top 100 Innovators in Photonics by ElectroOptics.

== Most cited papers ==
- Quack, Niels; Takabayashi, Alain Yuji; Sattari, Hamed; Edinger, Pierre; Jo, Gaehun; Bleiker, Simon J.; Errando-Herranz, Carlos; Gylfason, Kristinn B.; Niklaus, Frank; Khan, Umar; Verheyen, Peter; Mallik, Arun Kumar; Lee, Jun Su; Jezzini, Moises; Zand, Iman; Morrissey, Padraic; Antony, Cleitus; O'Brien, Peter; Bogaerts, Wim (2023). Microsystems & Nanoengineering.
- Mi, Sichen; Kiss, Marcell; Graziosi, Teodoro; Quack, Niels (2020). "Integrated photonic devices in single crystal diamond". Journal of Physics: Photonics. 2 (4): 042001. Bibcode:2020JPhP....2d2001M. doi:10.1088/2515-7647/aba171. S2CID 225374811.
- Mi, Sichen; Toros, Adrien; Graziosi, Teodoro; Quack, Niels (2019). "Non-contact polishing of single crystal diamond by ion beam etching". Diamond and Related Materials. 92: 248–252. Bibcode:2019DRM....92..248M. doi:10.1016/j.diamond.2019.01.007. S2CID 139239450.
- Kiss, Marcell; Graziosi, Teodoro; Toros, Adrien; Scharf, Toralf; Santschi, Christian; Martin, Olivier J. F.; Quack, Niels (2019). "High-quality single crystal diamond diffraction gratings fabricated by crystallographic etching" (PDF). Optics Express. 27 (21): 30371–30379. Bibcode:2019OExpr..2730371K. doi:10.1364/OE.27.030371. PMID 31684285. S2CID 207899402.
- Errando-Herranz, Carlos; Takabayashi, Alain Yuji; Edinger, Pierre; Sattari, Hamed; Gylfason, Kristinn B.; Quack, Niels (2020). "MEMS for Photonic Integrated Circuits". IEEE Journal of Selected Topics in Quantum Electronics. 26 (2): 1–16. arXiv:2212.05169. Bibcode:2020IJSTQ..2643384E. doi:10.1109/JSTQE.2019.2943384. S2CID 204201509.
- Quack, Niels; Sattari, Hamed; Takabayashi, Alain Yuji; Zhang, Yu; Verheyen, Peter; Bogaerts, Wim; Edinger, Pierre; Errando-Herranz, Carlos; Gylfason, Kristinn B. (2020). "MEMS-Enabled Silicon Photonic Integrated Devices and Circuits". IEEE Journal of Quantum Electronics. 56 (1): 1–10. Bibcode:2020IJQE...5646841Q. doi:10.1109/JQE.2019.2946841. hdl:1854/LU-8652980. S2CID 204923614.
- Seok, Tae Joon; Quack, Niels; Han, Sangyoon; Muller, Richard S.; Wu, Ming C. (2016). "Large-scale broadband digital silicon photonic switches with vertical adiabatic couplers". Optica. 3 (1): 64. Bibcode:2016Optic...3...64S. doi:10.1364/OPTICA.3.000064.
- Quack, Niels; Seok, Tae Joon; Han, Sangyoon; Muller, Richard S.; Wu, Ming C. (2016). "Scalable Row/Column Addressing of Silicon Photonic MEMS Switches". IEEE Photonics Technology Letters. 28 (5): 561–564. Bibcode:2016IPTL...28..561Q. doi:10.1109/LPT.2016.2515106. S2CID 20993686.
- Behroozpour, Behnam; Sandborn, Phillip A. M.; Quack, Niels; Seok, Tae-Joon; Matsui, Yasuhiro; Wu, Ming C.; Boser, Bernhard E. (2017). "Electronic-Photonic Integrated Circuit for 3D Microimaging". IEEE Journal of Solid-State Circuits. 52 (1): 161–172. Bibcode:2017IJSSC..52..161B. doi:10.1109/JSSC.2016.2621755. S2CID 12322886.
- Quack, Niels; Blunier, Stefan; Dual, Jurg; Arnold, Martin; Felder, Ferdinand; Ebneter, Christian; Rahim, Mohamed; Zogg, Hans (2008). "Tunable resonant cavity enhanced detectors using vertically actuated MEMS mirrors". Journal of Optics A: Pure and Applied Optics. 10 (4) 044015. Bibcode:2008JOptA..10d4015Q. doi:10.1088/1464-4258/10/4/044015.
- Boero, G.; Utke, I.; Bret, T.; Quack, N.; Todorova, M.; Mouaziz, S.; Kejik, P.; Brugger, J.; Popovic, R. S.; Hoffmann, P. (2005). "Submicrometer Hall devices fabricated by focused electron-beam-induced deposition". Applied Physics Letters. 86 (4): 042503. Bibcode:2005ApPhL..86d2503B. doi:10.1063/1.1856134.
