= Geesje Kwak =

Dutch art model (1877–1899)

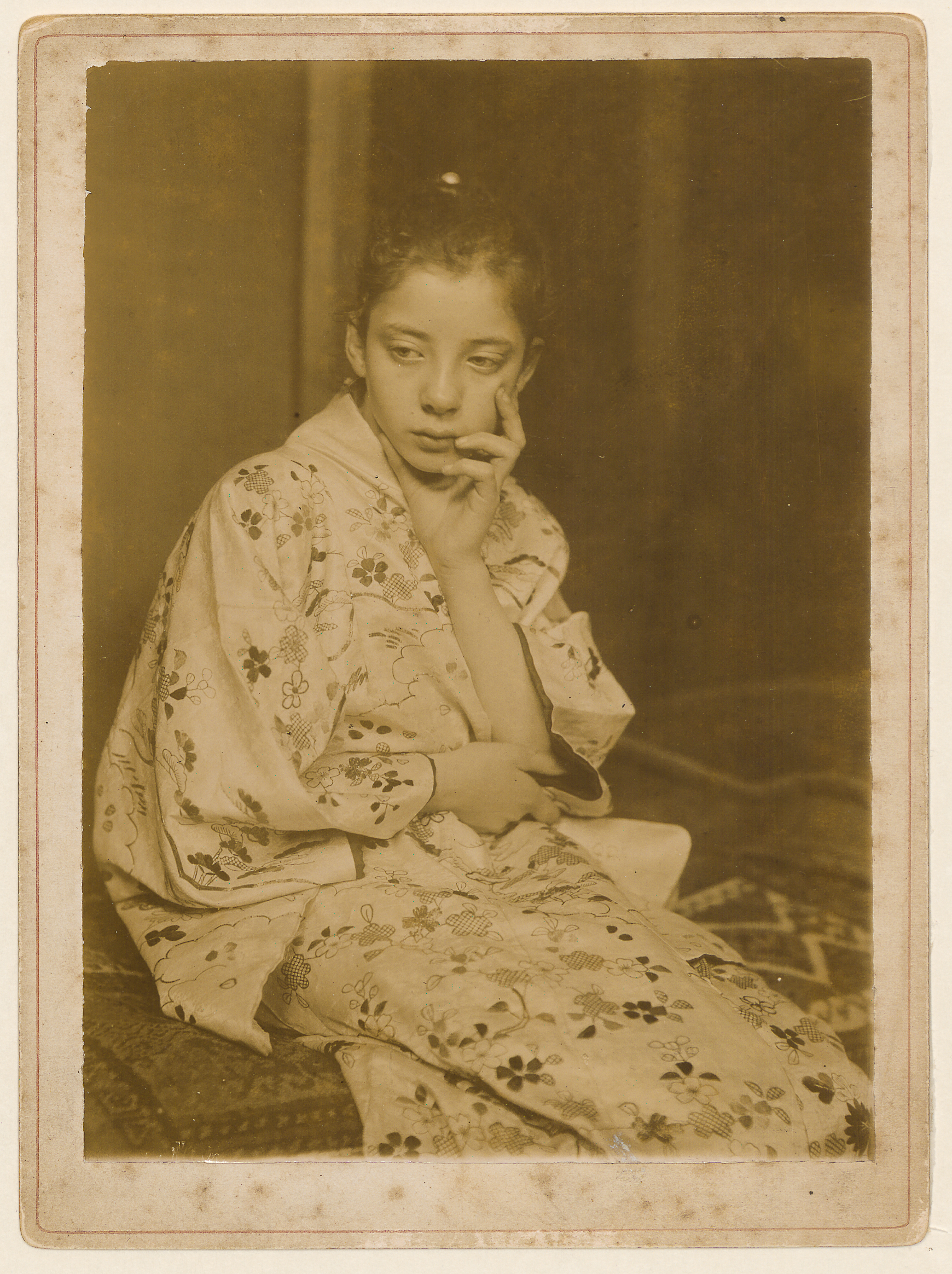
- Famous photograph of Geesje Kwak by George Hendrik Breitner (1894)
- Born: 17 April 1877; Zaandam, North Holland, Netherlands
- Died: 1899 (aged 22); South Africa
- Known for: Girl in a White Kimono

Geesje Kwak (born Gezina Kwak; 17 April 1877 – 1899) was a Dutch model for the painter and photographer George Breitner. She became known for the series of seven paintings (and accompanying photo studies) that Breitner made of her in 1893 and 1894 as the girl in red and white kimonos, lying on a sofa and standing in front of a mirror in an oriental interior.

== Life ==
Gezina Kwak was born on 17 April 1877, in Zaandam, North-Holland, Netherlands. Kwak moved to Amsterdam in 1893 at the age of sixteen with her elder sister Anna. Kwak became a seamstress and a hat seller. She and her sister first lived in the Govert Flinckstraat, and then in the Tweede van Swindenstraat in Dapperbuurt. The two sisters came into contact with the painter Breitner when he had just recovered from an eye infection and had moved into a studio at Lauriergracht. Breitner had visited an exhibition of Japanese prints in The Hague in 1892, and subsequently purchased several Japanese kimonos and a few folding screens. He had the two sisters pose in this setting in 1893.

Kwak soon became his main model. She walked around the studio and Breitner took pictures and sketches of her. This is how the series of paintings of Kwak in kimono was created, of which Girl in a White Kimono and Girl in Red Kimono are the best known. However, Kwak did not pose for Breitner for very long. In 1895 she emigrated to South Africa with her younger sister Niesje. There she died of tuberculosis in 1899 aged 22. Kwak was paid for her work, and the relationship between her and Breitner appears to have been strictly businesslike. Breitner kept a meticulous note in a preserved notebook about when and how long she had posed for him, and what amount of money he had given her for it.

== Literature ==
- Heteren, Marjan van; Jansen, Guido; Leeuw, Ronald de (2000). The poetry of reality : Dutch painters of the nineteenth Century. Amsterdam: Waanders Publishers. ISBN 90-400-9417-9. OCLC 45804799.

== Paintings & photographs ==
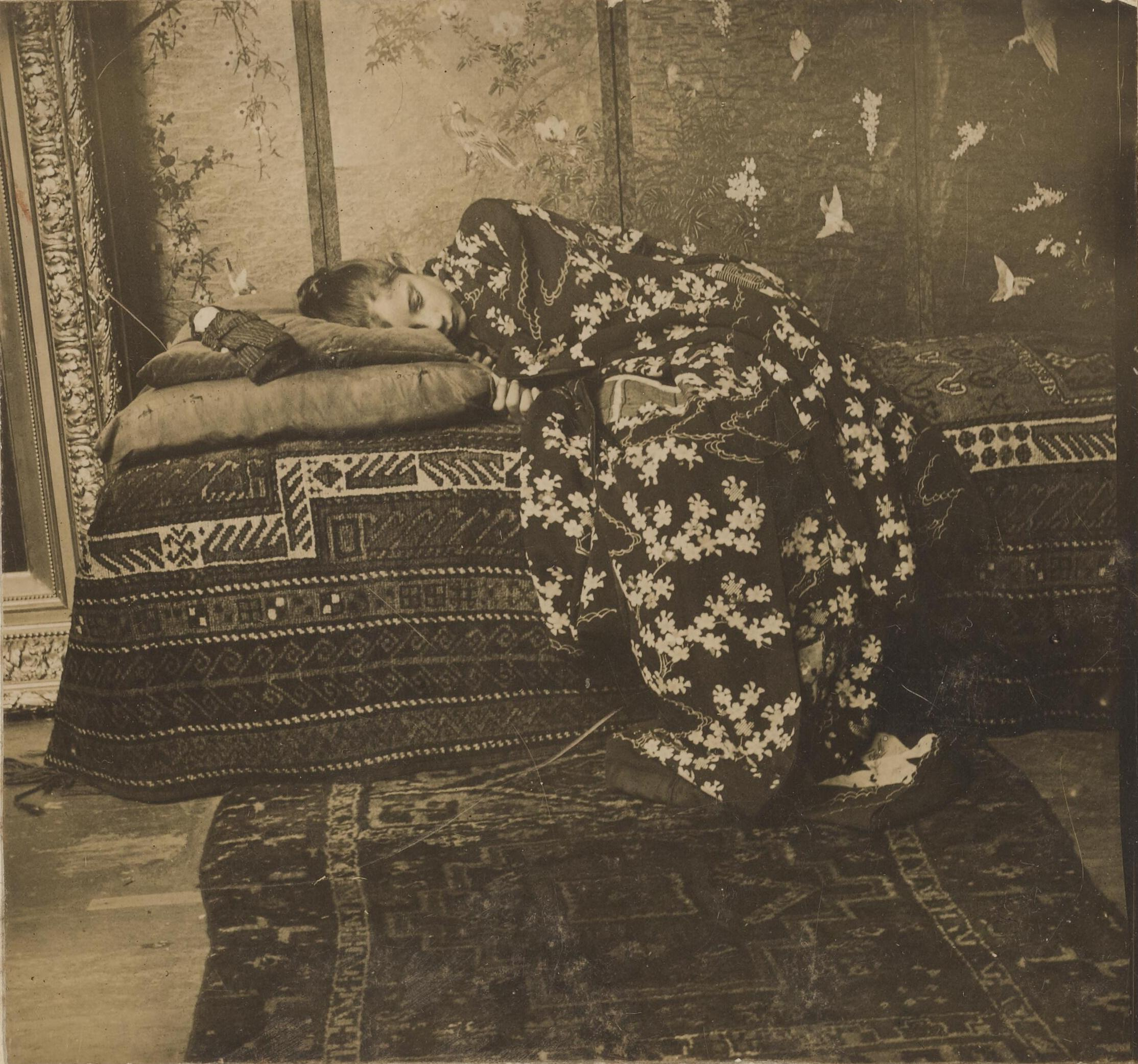

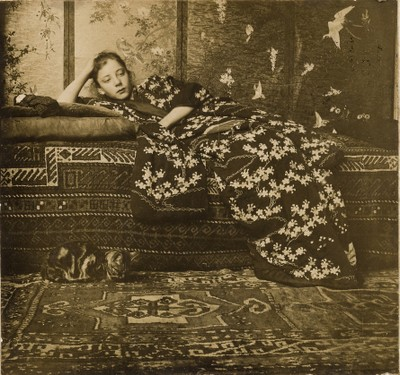

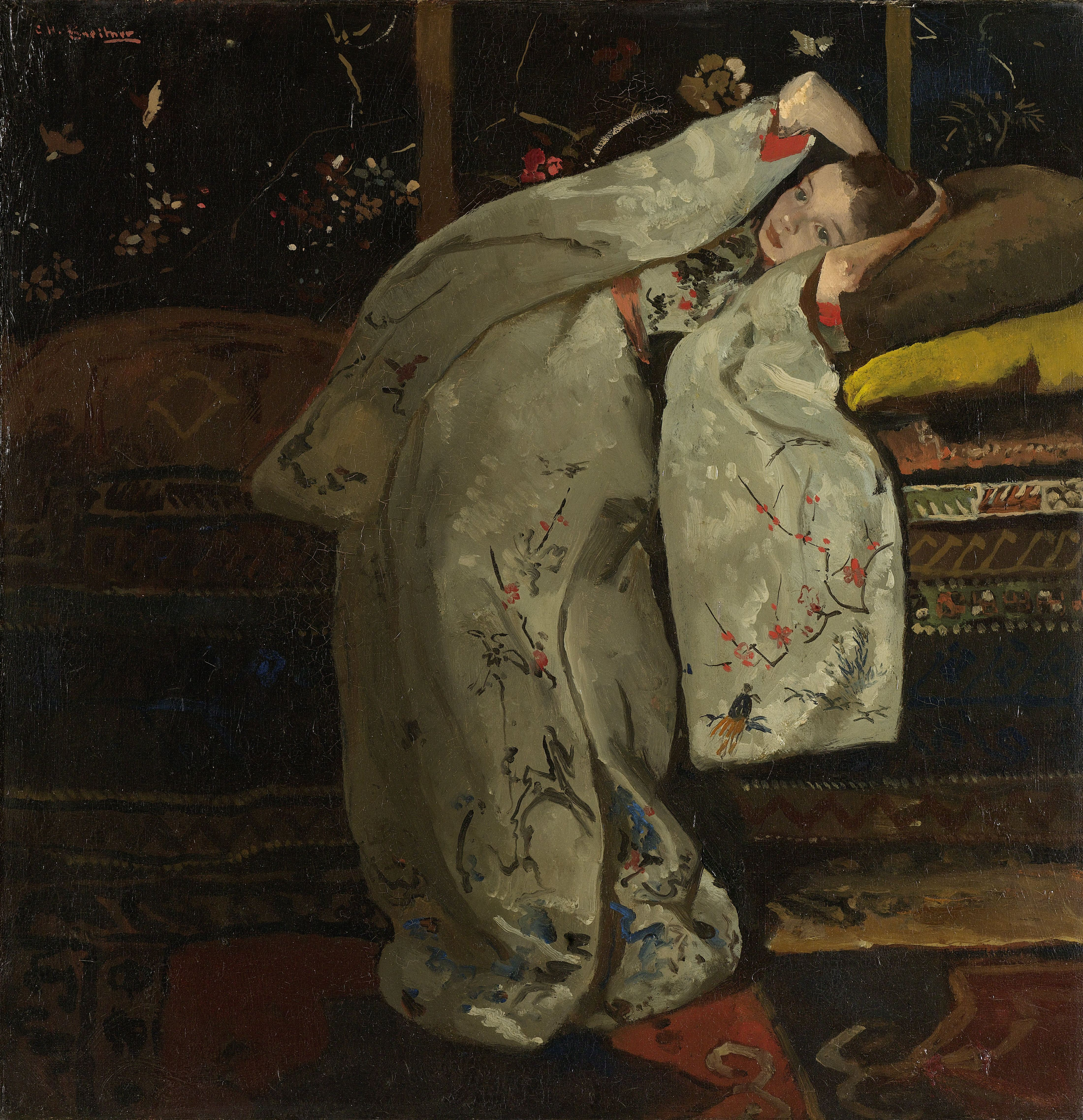

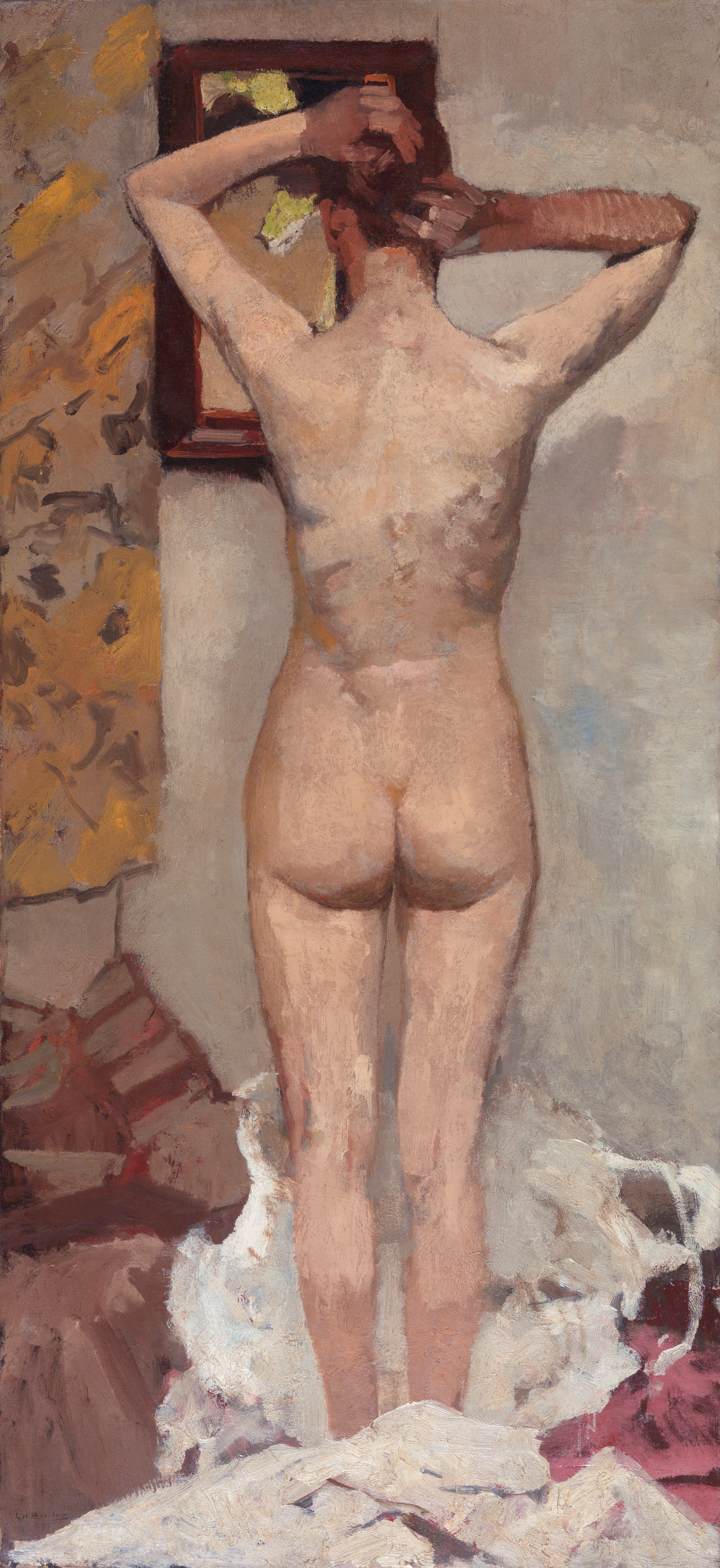

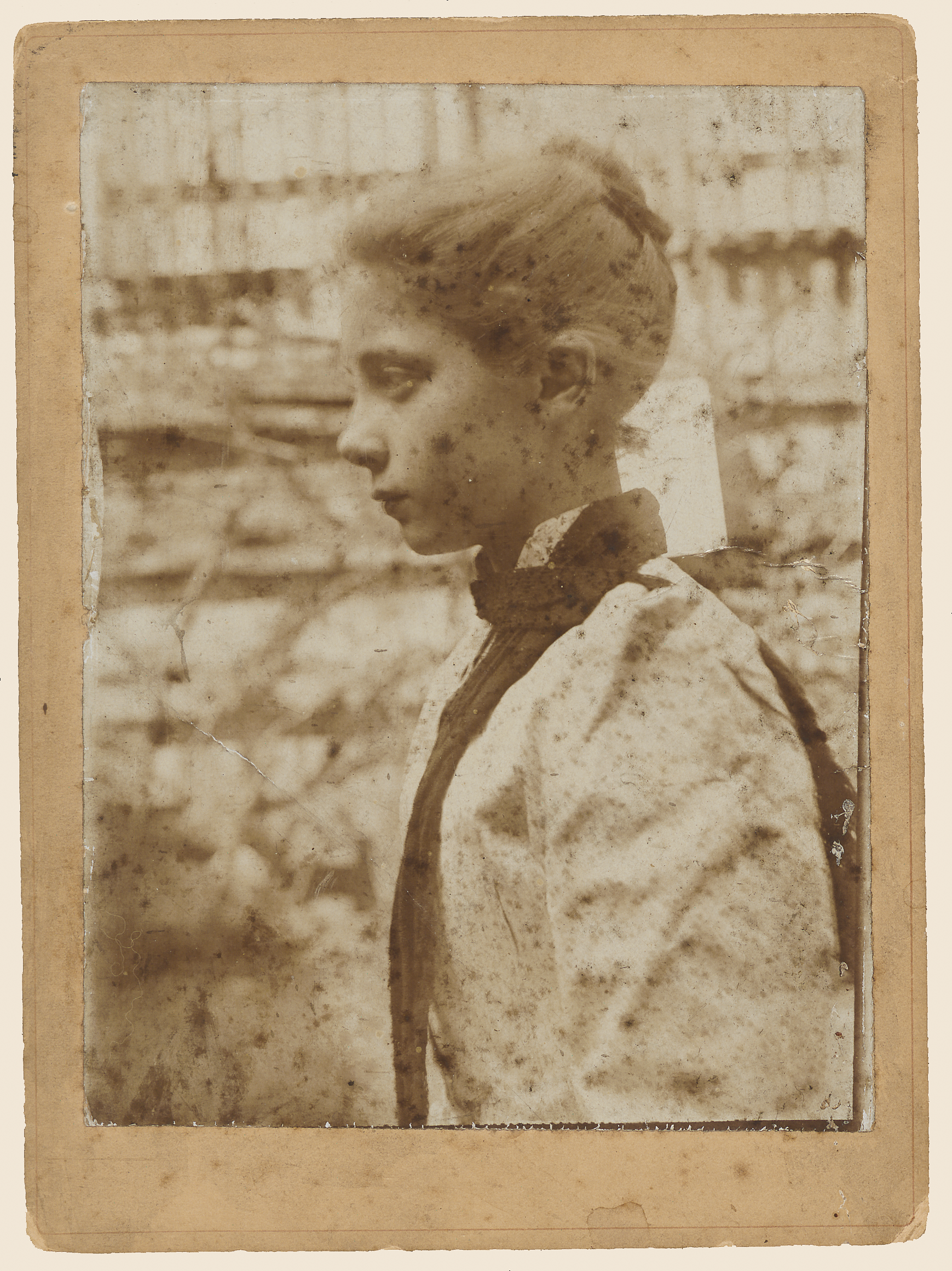

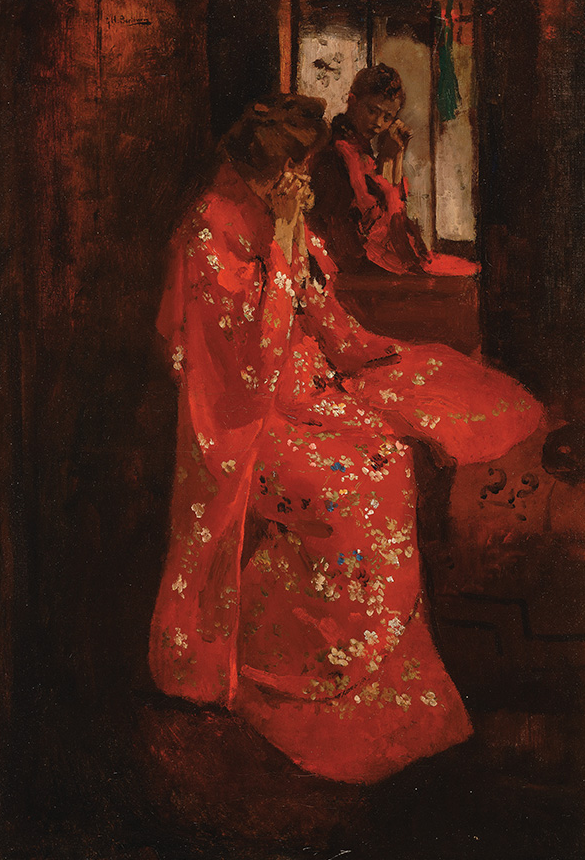
