= Kwak (store) =

Store in California

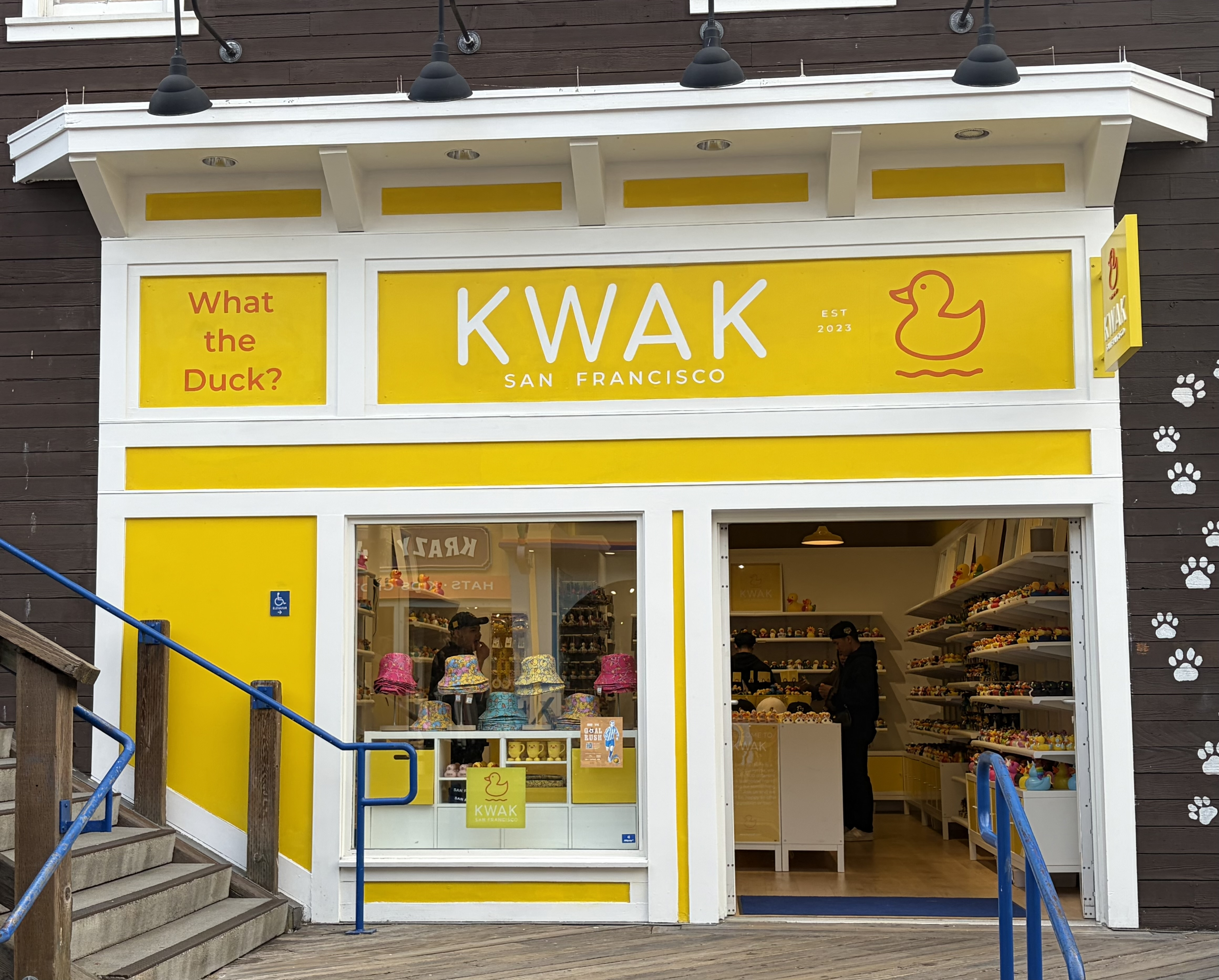
- The exterior of the store in 2026
- Location: Pier 39, San Francisco, California
- Coordinates: 37.8106°N 122.4103°W
- Owner: Joanne Calabrese; John Walton
- Website: kwaksf.com

Kwak is a store at Pier 39 in San Francisco, California specializing in rubber ducks. In 2024, it sold 50,000 ducks, with 600 different types being bought.

== History ==
The shop was started by Joanne Calabrese and John Walton, who are both co-owners of the shop. They were formerly coworkers together at Gap Inc. and wanted to use their extensive experience in retail to open a unique shop in San Francisco. Calabrese emailed Pier 39's leasing executive on "a bit of a whim" to ask if they had any temporary rental space. They began to stockpile on ducks even before they secured the spot, choosing the toy due to its nostalgia. The duo originally only leased a six-month long pop-up, but after realizing its popularity, decided to extend it to two years. They are also considering franchising stores due to the interest.

== Description ==
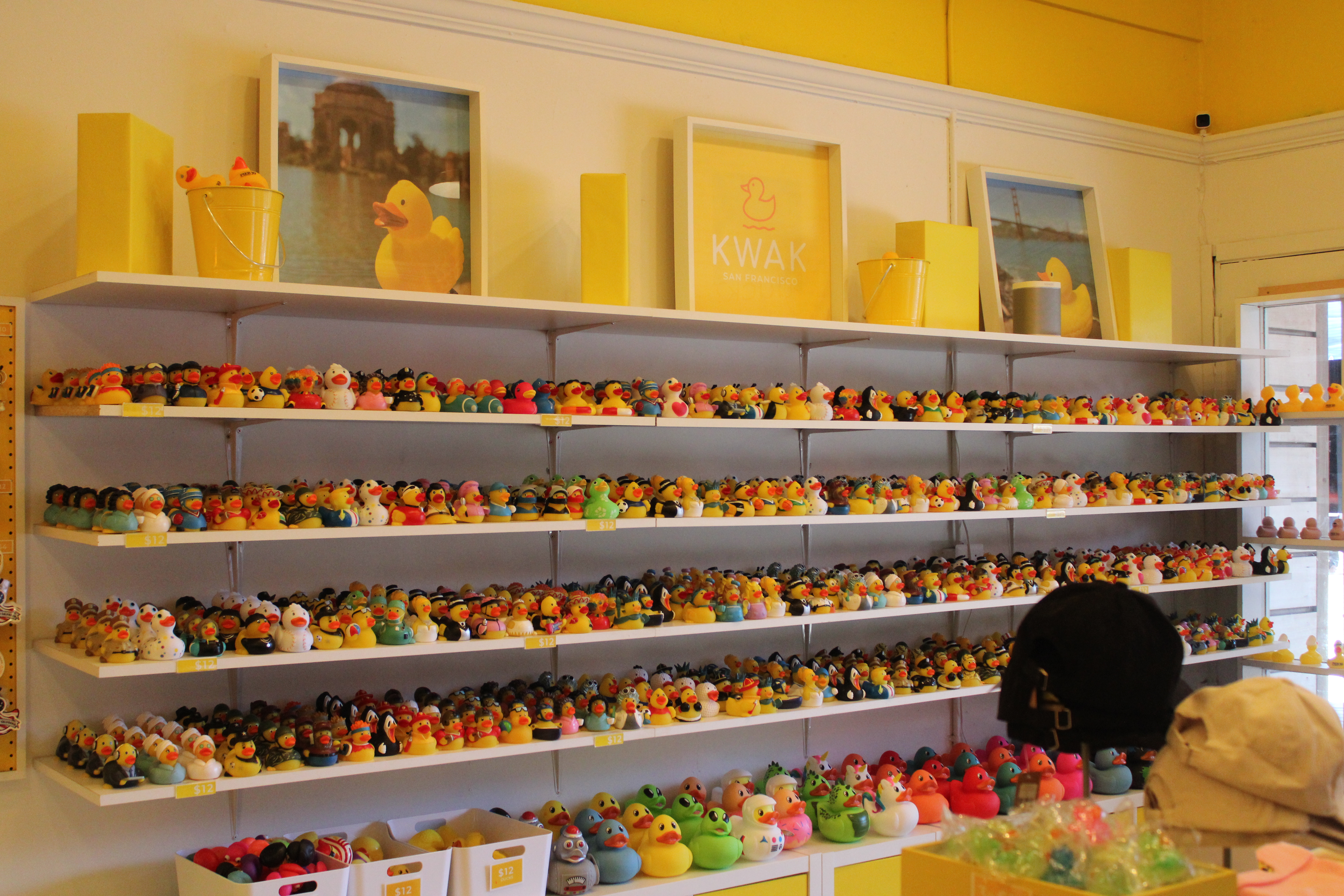
Interior, with shelves filled with ducks

The store has a multitude of ducks, with ducks based on celebrities such as Taylor Swift and Willie Nelson, holiday-themed ducks, ducks based on careers, and classic ducks of varying sizes. The standard-sized ducks usually go for about $10, but some can cost $20. The pop culture-based ducks, from California-based company CelebriDucks, cost $24. The store has since expanded its catalogue to include duck-related merchandise to include hats and umbrellas. The largest amount of ducks bought by one person is 48, by a Singaporean man.
