= McCloud Railway 18 =

Preserved American 2-8-2 locomotive

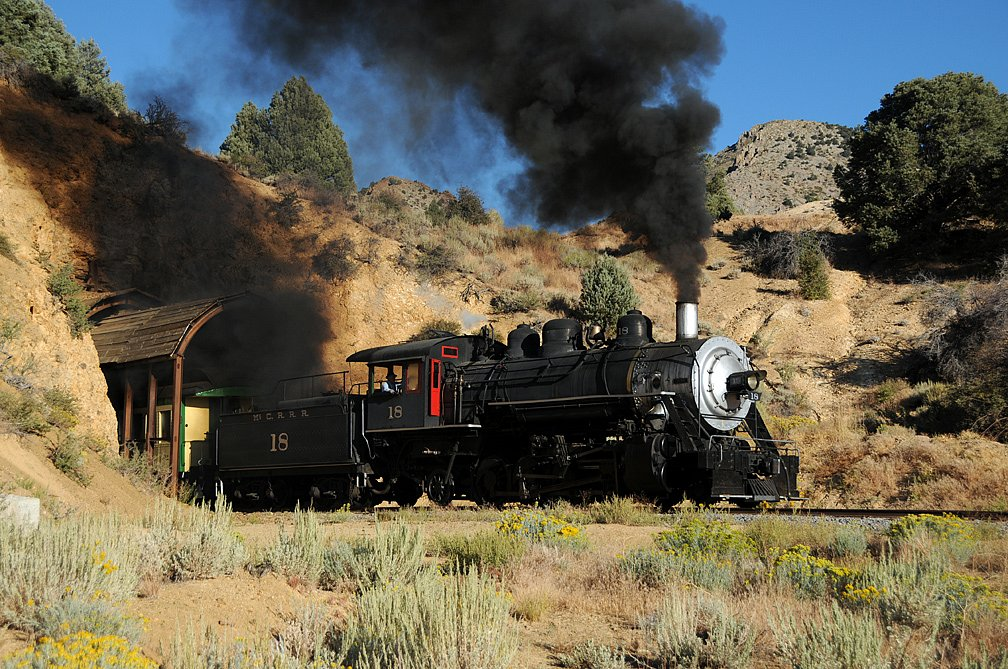
- No. 18 hauling an excursion train on the Virginia and Truckee Railroad on September 20, 2011
Type and origin
- Power type: Steam
- Builder: Baldwin Locomotive Works
- Serial number: 41709
- Build date: November 1914
Specifications
- Configuration
  - Whyte: 2-8-2
  - UIC: 1'D1'
- Gauge: 4 ft 8 1/2 in (1,435 mm)
- Driver dia.: 48 in (1.219 m)
- Loco weight: 178,400 lb (80.9 t)
- Fuel type: Oil
- Fuel capacity: 2,800 US gal (11,000 L; 2,300 imp gal)
- Water cap.: 4,000 US gal (15,000 L; 3,300 imp gal)
- Boiler pressure: 180 psi (1.24 MPa)
- Cylinders: Two, outside
- Cylinder size: 20 in × 28 in (508 mm × 711 mm)
- Valve gear: Walschaerts
- Valve type: Piston valves
- Loco brake: Air
- Train brakes: Air
- Couplers: Knuckle
Performance figures
- Tractive effort: 39,667 lbf (176.4 kN)
Career
- Operators: McCloud Railway; Shasta Sunset Dinner Train; Yreka Western Railroad; Sierra Railroad (leased); Fillmore and Western Railway (leased); Virginia and Truckee Railroad
- Numbers: MCR 18; YW 18
- Retired: 1964
- Restored: February 2001
- Current owner: V&T Railway Commission
- Disposition: Operational

McCloud Railway 18 is a 2-8-2 "Mikado" type steam locomotive, built in November 1914 by the Baldwin Locomotive Works (BLW). The locomotive was purchased new by the McCloud River Railway Company (MCR) in 1914 as a standalone purchase. No. 18 was bought by the Yreka Western Railroad (YW) in 1956 and bought back by the McCloud in 1998. It was restored to operation for McCloud in 2001 and operated there until it was sold in 2005 to the Nevada Commission for the Reconstruction of the Virginia and Truckee Railroad (VT).

== History ==
=== Revenue service ===
No. 18 was built in November 1914 by the Baldwin Locomotive Works (BLW) for the McCloud Railway (MCR), it was purchased new by the McCloud for a cost of $16,871.79. The following year in 1915, the engine was sent to the Panama–Pacific International Exposition in San Francisco. The display was jointly sponsored by the McCloud Railway, Weed Lumber Company and Red River Lumber Company. In January 1916, the engine was returned to McCloud, where it worked most of its career until being used as backup power in 1953, when the railroad was dieselized.

In 1956, No. 18 was sold (like many McCloud steam locomotives at the time) to the Yreka Western Railroad (YW), a small, power-starved railroad also in Northern California. The engine operated in excursion service with No. 19 at Yreka until 1964, when it blew out a cylinder head while on a doubleheader trip with No. 19 and was taken out of service, however, due to the lack of funds and money to repair the damaged cylinder, it would be the last time No. 18 operated for the Yreka Western as it would be permanently retired from service. It sat in storage outside the Yreka Western's yard under a tarp for the next thirty-four years.

In March 1998, the McCloud Railway re-purchased No. 18 from the Yreka Western and was moved back to their headquarters in McCloud, California.

=== Excursion service ===
That same year when the locomotive returned to McCloud, the railroad immediately began restoring it to operating condition to assist No. 25 for railfan trips, after four years of restoration work, No. 18 returned to service in February 2001 and quickly became the favorite unit as it was bigger and stronger than No. 25 and handled the large grades on the road better. It continued in regular excursion service on the McCloud such as occasionally hauling the Shasta Sunset Dinner Train, up until 2004 when No. 18 was put up for sale.

In January 2005, with the imminent demise of the McCloud Railway as a financial entity, No. 18 was sold to the Nevada Commission for the Reconstruction of the Virginia and Truckee Railroad (VT) in Virginia City, Nevada. No. 18 made its final run for the McCloud on August 7, 2005 and was put into storage. It remain in storage until April 2007 when it was leased to the Sierra Railroad in Oakdale, California for use on commuter trains. No. 18 was eventually moved to the Virginia and Truckee Railroad in mid-summer of 2010, where it continues to haul excursion trains today. It was originally planned to be renumbered to No. 31, but was never renumbered. The V&T Railway is owned by the publicly owned V&T Commission should not be confused with the privately owned Virginia & Truckee Railroad.

In 2015, it was taken out of service to undergo its Federal Railroad Administration (FRA) 1,472-day inspection and overhaul, which took five years to complete. It returned to service in early 2020.

== Appearances in media ==
- In 2010, before the No. 18 was moved to the Virginia and Truckee Railroad, it was leased to the Fillmore and Western Railway for filming of the 2011 romantic drama film Water for Elephants, starring Reese Witherspoon and Robert Pattinson.
- On November 3, 2023, No. 18 was masqueraded as Northern Pacific No. 1770 for filming of an episode of the Paramount Network television series Yellowstone, starring Kevin Costner.

== See also ==
- California Western 45
- Columbia River Belt Line 7
- Polson Logging Co. 2
- Robert Dollar Co. No. 3
- Sierra Railway 28
