= Magma Arizona Railroad =

Defunct short-line railroad in Arizona, U.S.

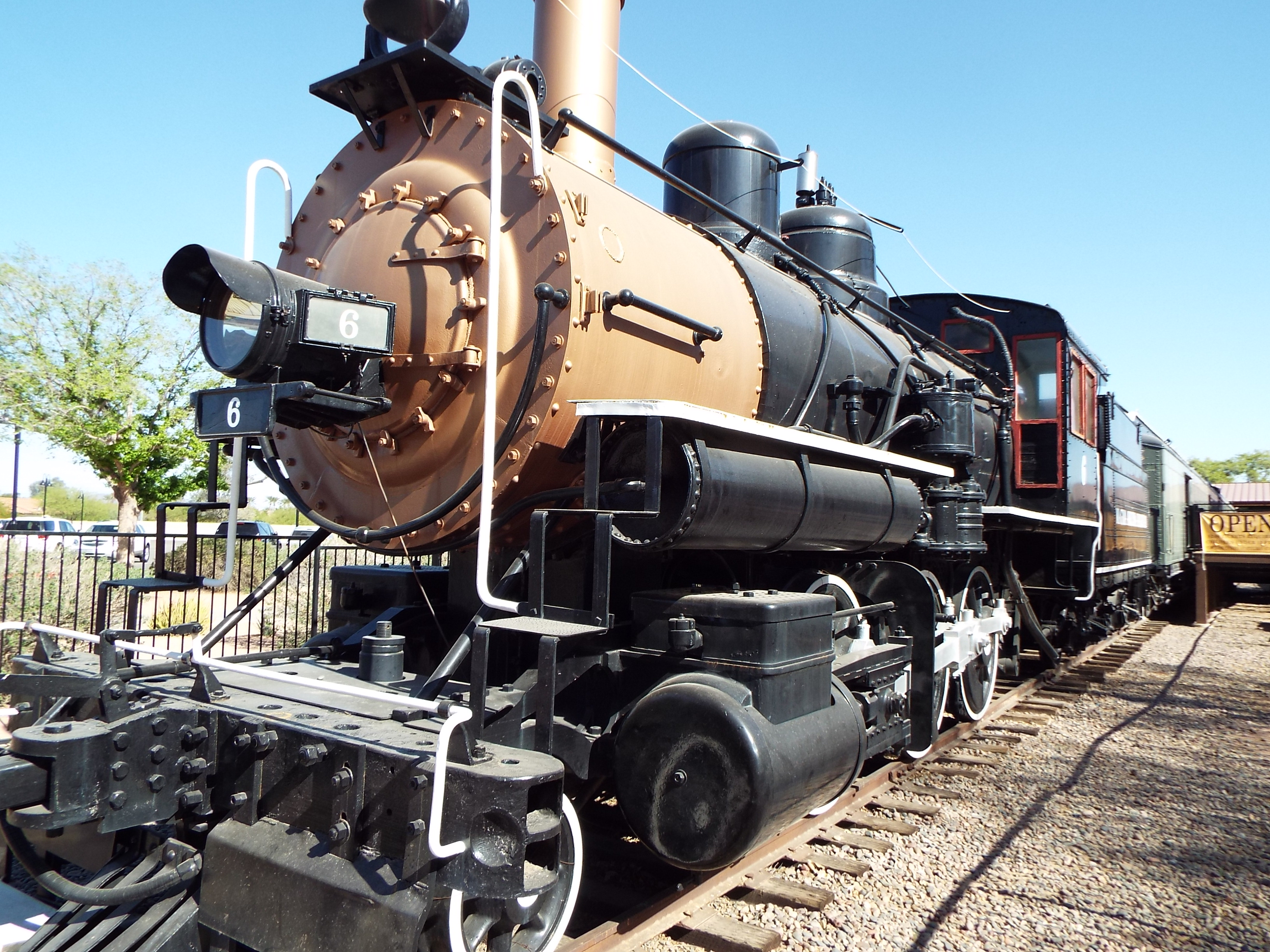
- Magma Arizona Railroad Engine No. 6 at McCormick-Stillman Railroad Park in Scottsdale, AZ

Overview
- Headquarters: Superior, Arizona
- Reporting mark: MAA
- Locale: Arizona
- Dates of operation: 1920–1997

Technical
- Track gauge: 4 ft 8 1/2 in (1,435 mm) standard gauge
- Previous gauge: 3 ft (914 mm)

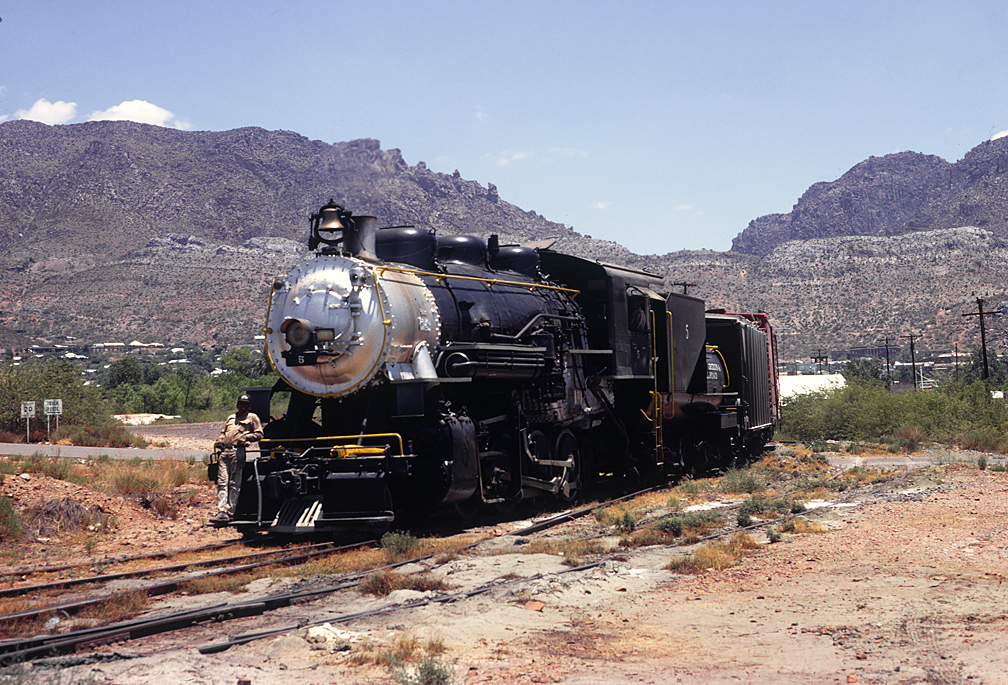
Magma Engine No. 5 switching in Superior, 1967.

The Magma Arizona Railroad (reporting mark MAA) was built by the Magma Copper Company and operated from 1915 to 1997.

The railroad was originally built as a 3 ft (914 mm) narrow gauge line, but was converted to 4 ft 8 1/2 in (1,435 mm) standard gauge in 1923. Originally headquartered in Superior, Arizona, the company primarily hauled cattle and copper on 30.2 miles (48.6 km) of standard gauge track to and from the Southern Pacific mainline in Magma, Arizona, between Florence and Queen Creek.

BHP purchased the Magma Copper Company and its lines in 1996 for A$3.2 billion and suspended rail operations on this line a year later.

The Magma was the last industrial short line railroad to use steam power in the United States, dieselizing on September 4, 1968.

== Revival ==
The railroad has since changed hands and is currently owned by Resolution Copper, a joint venture of Rio Tinto and BHP. Exploration in 2001-2003 resulted in the discovery of a large copper ore body some 7,000 feet (2,100 m) beneath the surface of lands just three miles (4.8 km) east of Superior. If the mine is eventually reopened, it is highly likely the Magma Arizona will be revived to transport the one billion short tons (910,000,000 t) of ore to off-site smelters. Discussions with representatives of Resolution indicate the Magma Arizona name will be kept if the mine and railroad are both reopened, which may occur after feasibility studies are completed in 2009.

== Locomotives roster ==
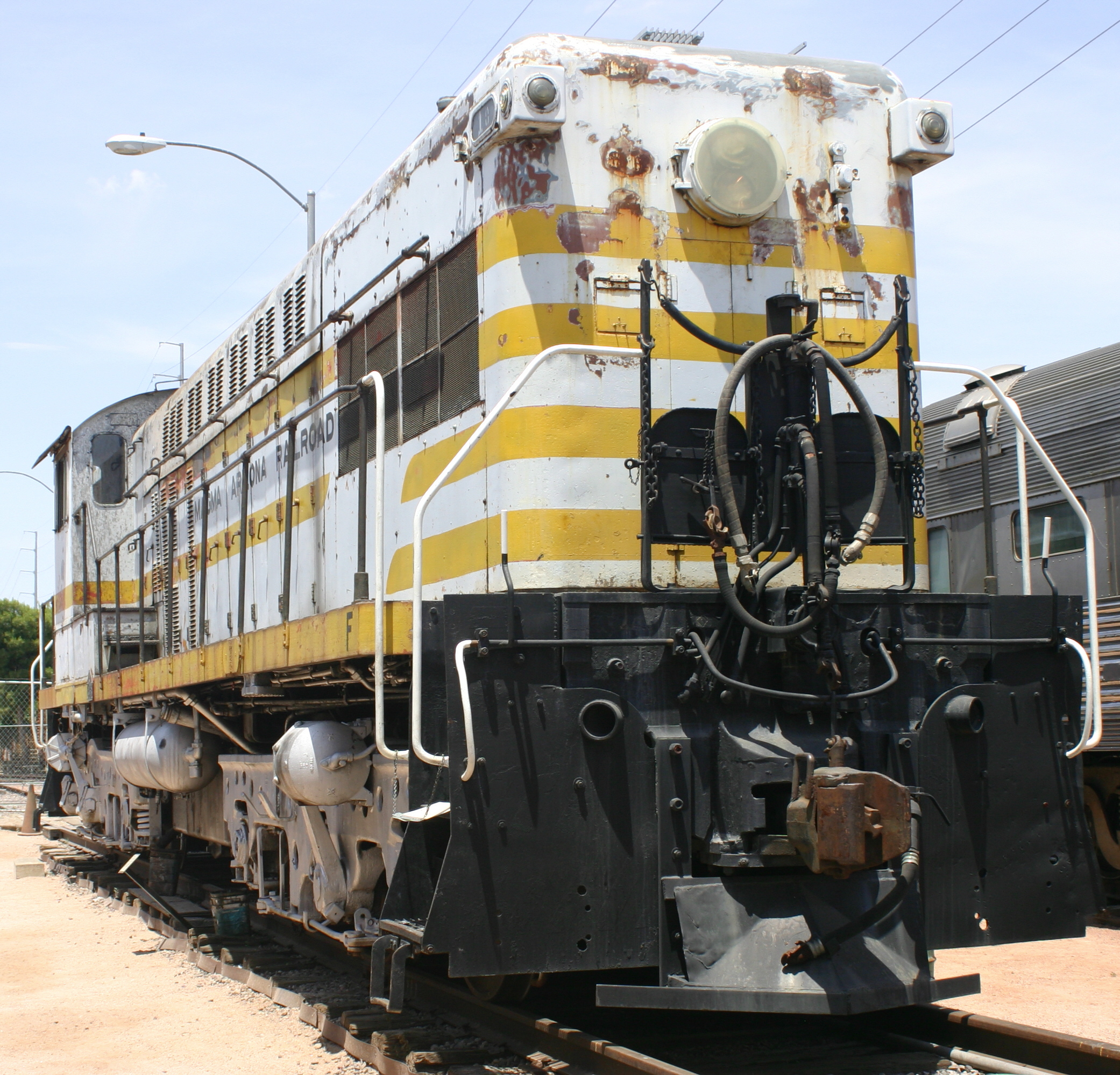
Engine#10 at the Arizona Railway Museum

- Engine No. 3, an Alco RS3, was built in 1955 and was used by the MAA for 44 years before being sold in 1999 to the Blacklands Railroad in Sulfur Springs, Texas, and then sold again in 2004 to the Oklahoma Railway Museum for static display. In 2018, it was purchased by the Arizona State Railroad Museum foundation, who moved it to Williams, Arizona, and it is temporarily stored at the Grand Canyon Railway's yard, until the ASRM's own building finishes construction.
- Engine No. 5, a 2-8-0, was the only standard gauge steam locomotive acquired new by the Magma Arizona. After retirement in 1968, it was later sold to the Oregon Pacific & Eastern Railroad. It's now on display at the Galveston Railroad Museum in Galveston, Texas. The locomotive also had a few movie roles in Bearcats!, 1971 and Emperor of the North Pole, 1973.
- Engine No. 6 is a Baldwin Locomotive Works 2-6-0 built in October 1907 and operated until 1960. It is now on display at the McCormick-Stillman Railroad Park in Scottsdale, Arizona.
- Engine No. 7, a Baldwin 2-8-2, was built in 1917 for the Tremont and Gulf Railroad, who sold it to Magma in 1954. It was featured in the popular epic film How the West Was Won. The engine was purchased by the Texas State Railroad in 1974 and rehabbed in 1978.
- Engine No. 8, a Baldwin S-8, was originally built for the Medford Corporation in 1952. After Medford suspended railroad logging operations in 1961, the locomotive was sold to Magma Arizona in 1968. Its generator failed in September 1992 and was sold to The Southern Oregon Chapter of the National Railway Historical Society, who rehabbed it for use on the Central Oregon and Pacific Railroad. It is the only Baldwin switcher built with dynamic braking.
- Engine No. 9, a Baldwin S-12, was built for the McCloud River Railroad in October of 1953. It was numbered No. 31. It was purchased by Magma in 1969. It is currently stored in Superior, Arizona, where it is out of service.
- Engine No. 10, a Baldwin DRS-6-6-1500 was built in 1950 for the McCloud River Railroad as their No. 29. It was purchased in 1969 by Magma and renumbered to Engine No. 10 and operated on the Magma line from January, 1970–1991. In 1994, it was donated to the Arizona Railway Museum in Chandler, Arizona, where it is largely functional.

== Appearances in media ==
In the 1960s, several of MAA’s steam locomotives have appeared in a number of motion picture films, including How the West Was Won and Cheyenne Autumn.

== Gallery ==
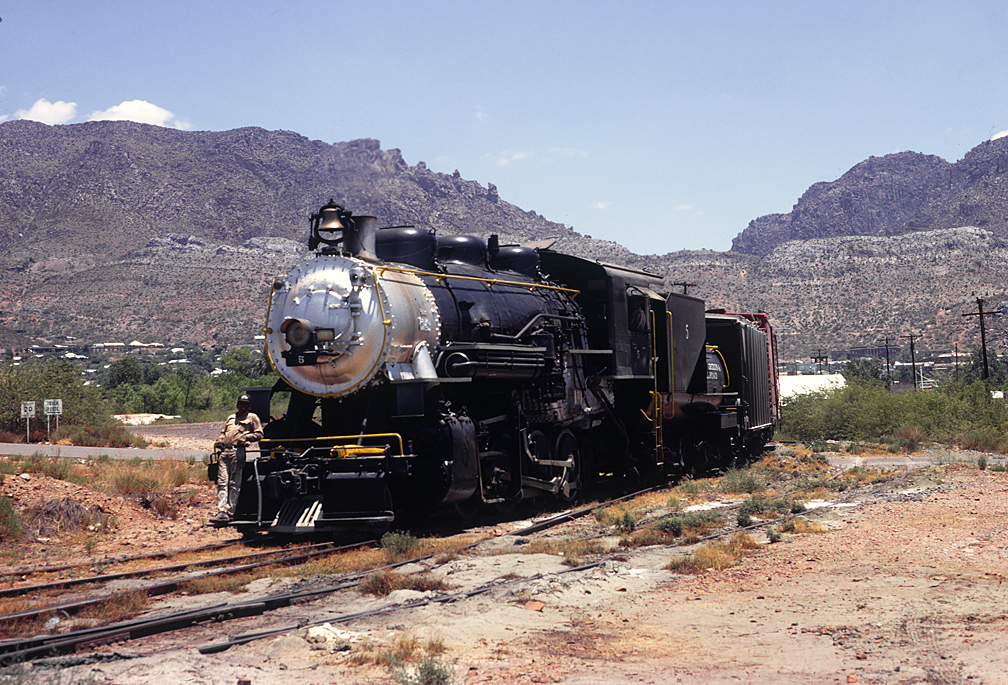

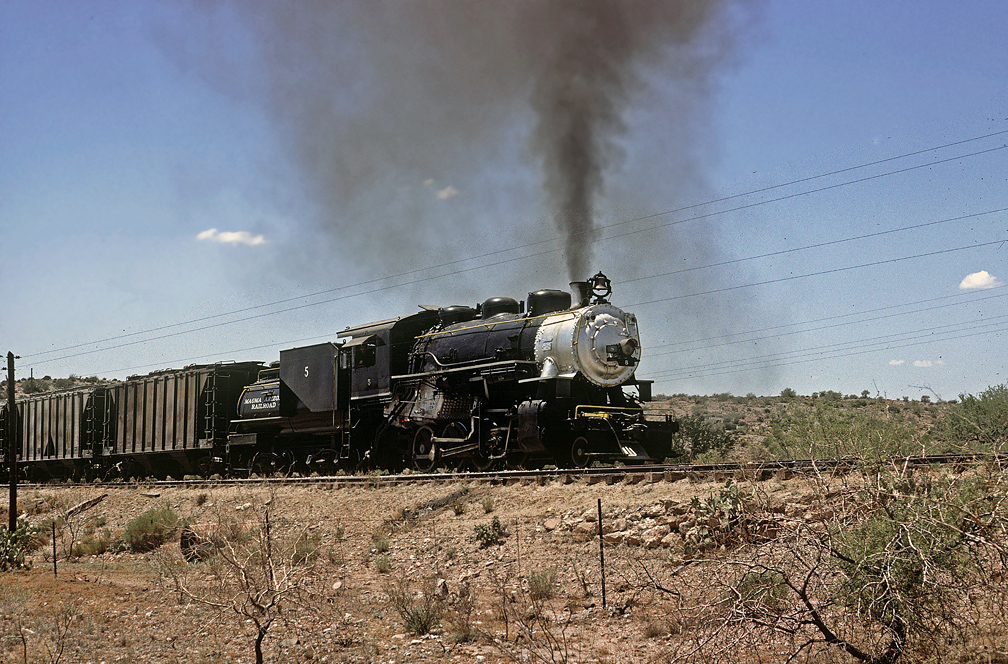
Magma 5 returning to Superior June 1967

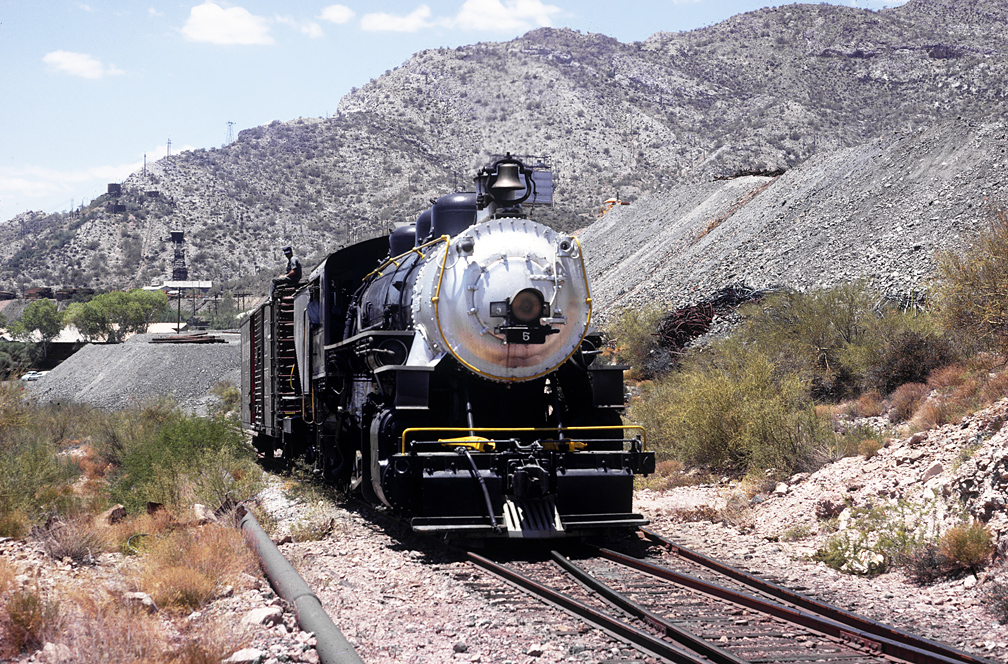
Magma 5 Backing down from the mine June 1967

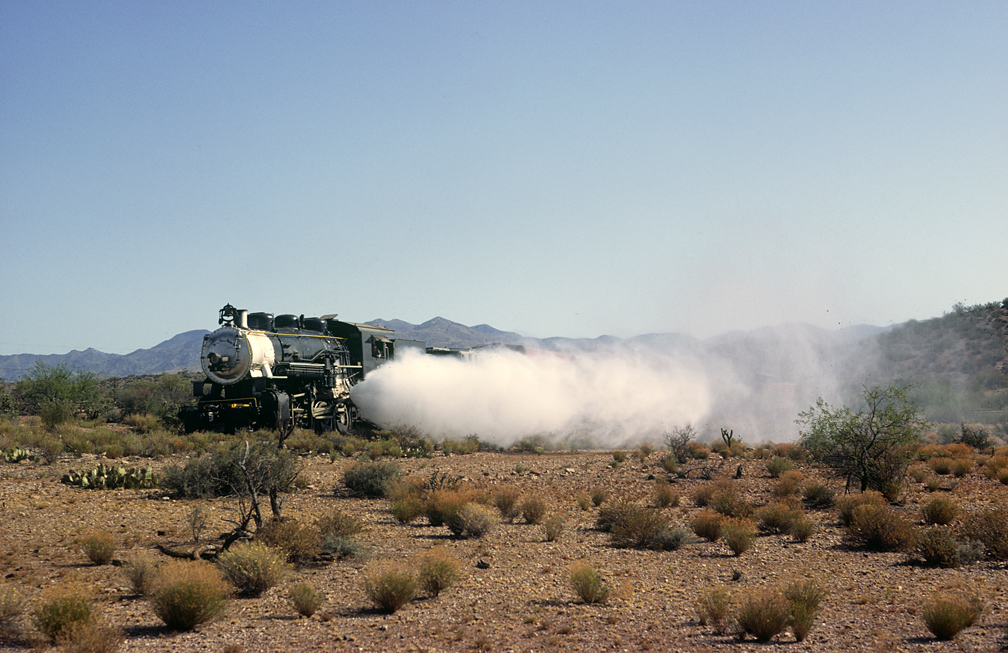
Magma 5 heading South blow down June 1967

== Bibliography ==
Chappell, Gordon. Rails to Carry Copper: A History of the Magma Arizona Railroad. Boulder, Colorado; Pruett Publishing Company, 1973. Includes over 200 photographs, maps, and scale drawings.
