= Yreka Western Railroad =

Railroad company

Yreka Western Railroad Company

Yreka Railroad Company
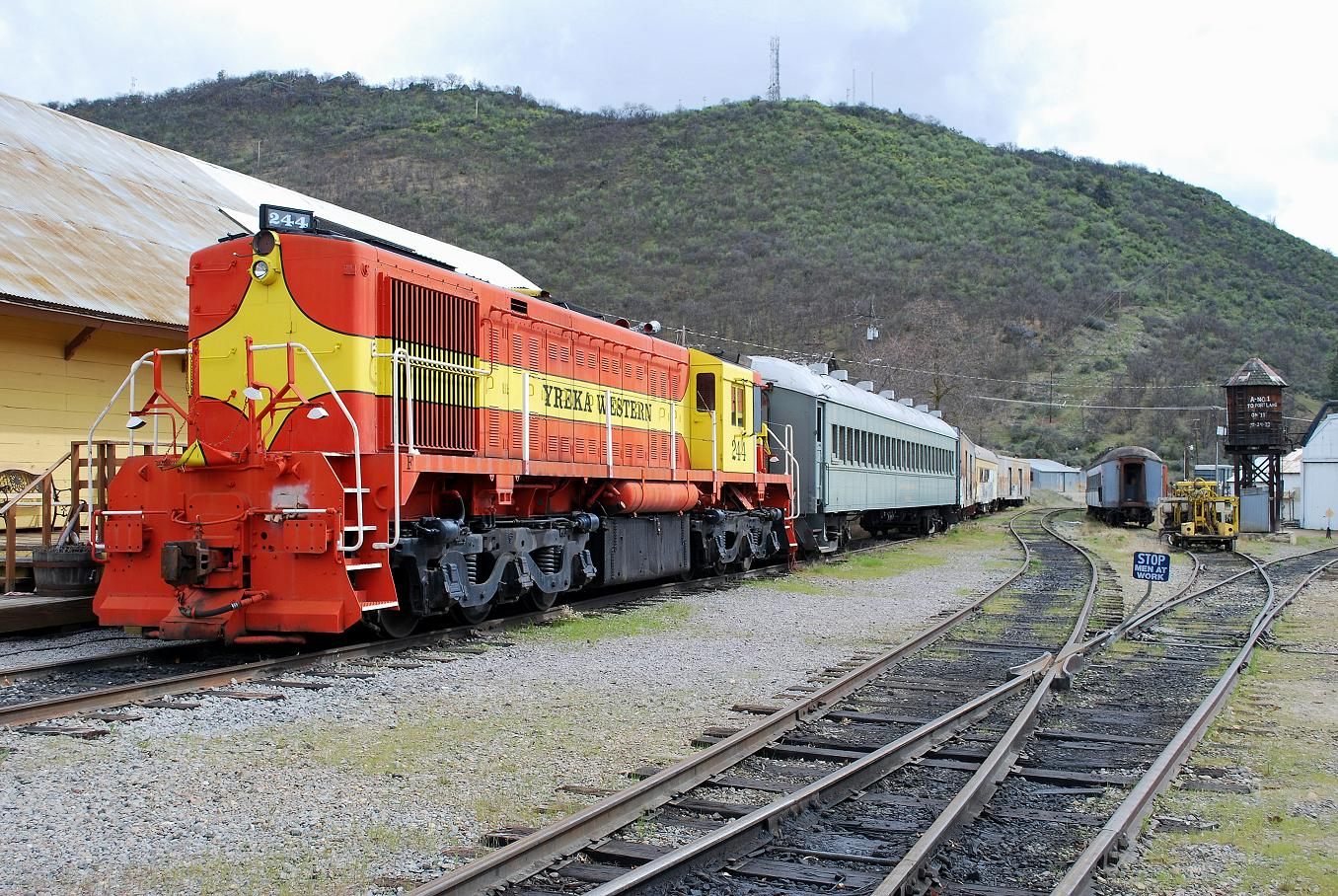
- An ALCO MRS-1 at Yreka station.
- Terminus: Yreka California
- Connections: Union Pacific Railroad in Montague CA

Commercial operations
- Original gauge: 4 ft 8 1/2 in (1,435 mm) standard gauge

Preserved operations
- Owned by: Railmark Holdings
- Operated by: Railmark Holdings, Incorporated
- Reporting mark: YW
- Length: 8.86-mile (14.26 km)
- Preserved gauge: 4 ft 8 1/2 in (1,435 mm) standard gauge

Commercial history
- Opened: 1889
- 1888: Yreka Railroad Company Incorporated
- 1889: Rail Line Opened
- 1933: Re-Incorporated as Yreka Western Railroad Company
- 1953: Kyle Railways

Preservation history
- 1986: Blue Goose Excursion Train Begins
- 1999: Sold to Rocky Mountain Railway and Mining Museum
- 2016: Ceased tourist operations
- January 1, 2017: Sold to Railmark Holdings
- Headquarters: Yreka, California

Website
- www.yrekawestern.com

The Yreka Western Railroad Company (reporting mark YW) is a shortline railroad that operates freight trains and formerly passenger excursions between the Central Oregon & Pacific interchange at Montague and the city of Yreka, California. Railmark Holdings acquired the Yreka Western Railroad in 2017.

== History ==
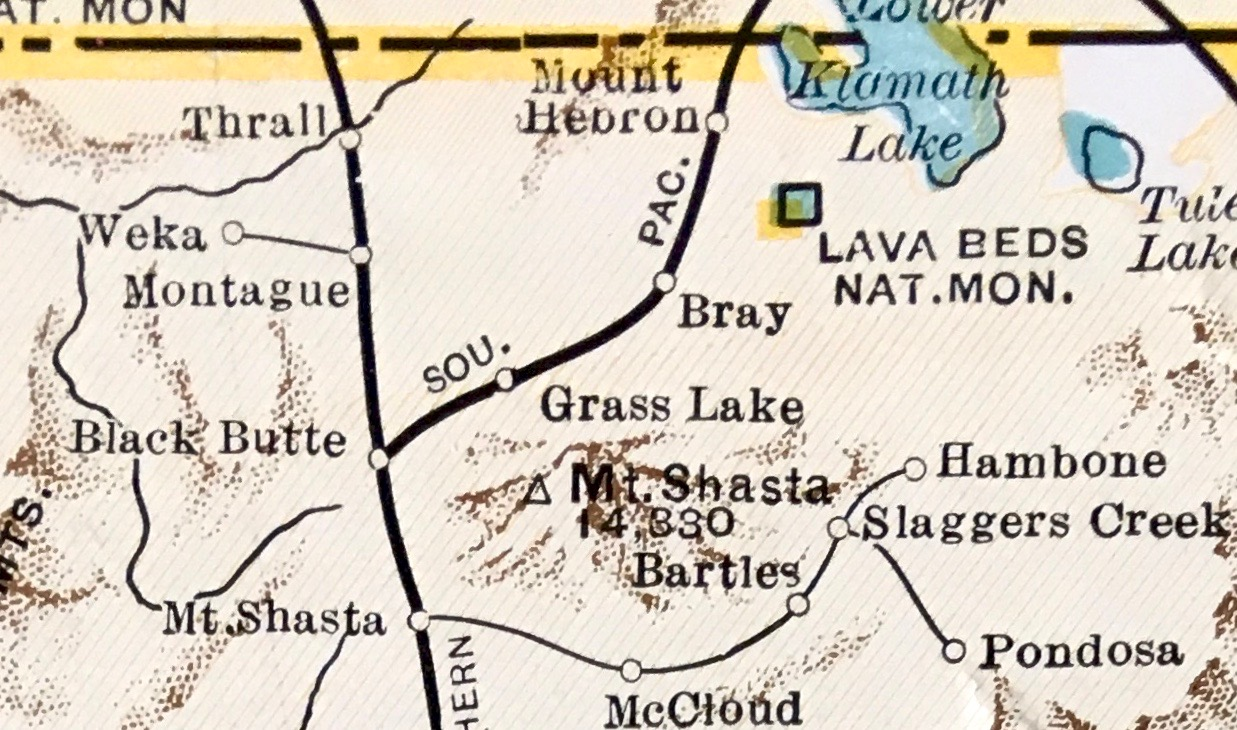
Route in 1931

The Yreka Railroad Company was incorporated in May 1888, with a capital stock of $100,000, and opened in January 1889, connecting Yreka to the Southern Pacific Company lessor Central Pacific Railroad (ex-California and Oregon Railroad).

The decision to build the Yreka Railroad was due in part to the Southern Pacific's decision to bypass Yreka in favor of a shorter, and more level route through the Shasta Valley and the city of Montague. Not to be left without a rail connection, the citizens of Yreka formed their own railroad. The railroad hauled passengers and local freight.

In August 1933, the railroad was re-incorporated as the Yreka Western Railroad Company. The railroad was acquired by Willis Kyle in 1953 who eventually formed the Kyle Railways empire. Eventually, the Central Oregon & Pacific Railroad acquired the SP connection at Montague in 1995. In 1999, Kyle Railways sold the Yreka Western Railroad to the Rocky Mountain Railway and Mining Museum of Denver Colorado, who in turn, sold the company to Railmark Holdings, Inc. on January 1, 2017.

The railroad ceased tourist operations in 2016, today, the railroad continues to operate for online industries, transloading, railcar services, track construction and maintenance. The railroad also continues in freight service such as wood chips, forest products, propane and transload commodities.

== Locomotives ==
Locomotive details
Number	Image	Type	Model	Built	Builder	Notes
Unknown		Diesel	HLB	1929	Plymouth Locomotive Works	Sold
1		Steam	2-4-2T	1889	Baldwin Locomotive Works	Scrapped in 1930
2		Steam	4-4-0	1886	American Locomotive Company	Unknown
3		Steam	4-4-0	1882	American Locomotive Company	Scrapped in 1932
7		Steam	0-6-0	1914	American Locomotive Company	Scrapped in 1956
8		Steam	0-6-0	1916	Baldwin Locomotive Works	Scrapped in 1956
9		Steam	2-6-2	1901	Baldwin Locomotive Works	Sold to Age of Steam Roundhouse
10		Steam	2-6-2	1901	Baldwin Locomotive Works	Scrapped in 1944
18		Steam	2-8-2	1914	Baldwin Locomotive Works	Sold to the McCloud Railway and later the Virginia and Truckee Railroad
19		Steam	2-8-2	1915	Baldwin Locomotive Works	Sold to Age of Steam Roundhouse
20		Diesel	SW8	1953	Electro-Motive Diesel	Scrapped in 2011
21		Diesel	SW8	1953	Electro-Motive Diesel	Unknown
94		Steam	Shay	1917	Lima Locomotive Works	Scrapped in 1946
100		Steam	2-8-2	1953	American Locomotive Company	Scrapped in 1955
100 (2nd)		Diesel	RDC-1	1953	Budd Company	Woodland, California
244		Diesel	MRS-1	1953	American Locomotive Company/General Electric	Scrapped in 2011
439		Diesel	SD9	1955	Electro-Motive Diesel	Sold to Western Rail, Inc.
602		Diesel	SW8	1952	Electro-Motive Diesel	Sold to Western Rail, Inc.
603		Diesel	S-1	1952	American Locomotive Company	Sold to LWRY
604		Diesel	S-1	1952	American Locomotive Company	Scrapped in 1986
1171		Diesel	S-4	1955	American Locomotive Company	Scrapped in 1985
1172		Diesel	S-4	1955	American Locomotive Company	Scrapped in 1987

== See also ==
- List of heritage railroads in the United States
