= Oregon Coast Scenic Railroad =

Heritage railway in Oregon, US

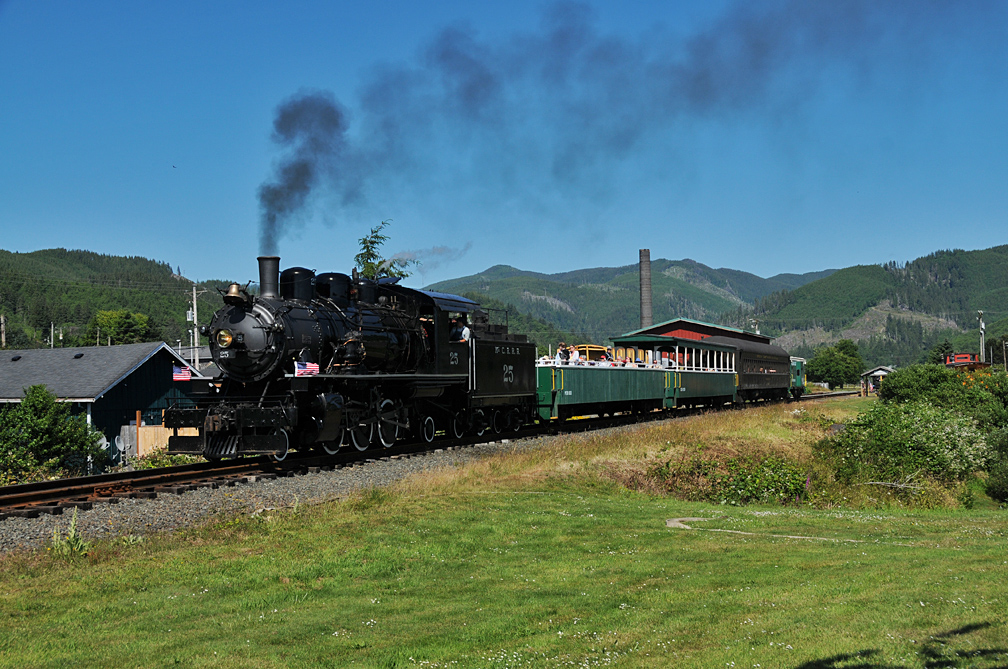
- No. 25 departing from Garibaldi with an excursion train on July 4, 2011

Overview
- Headquarters: Garibaldi, Oregon
- Reporting mark: OCSR
- Locale: Tillamook County, Oregon
- Dates of operation: 2003–present

Technical
- Track gauge: 4 ft 8 1/2 in (1,435 mm) standard gauge
- Length: 46 mi (74 km)

Other
- Website: oregoncoastscenic.org

The Oregon Coast Scenic Railroad (reporting mark OCSR) is a heritage railroad, a 501(c)(3) non-profit organization, operating in Oregon, US, primarily between Garibaldi and Rockaway Beach, with additional special trips to Wheeler, Nehalem River and into the Salmonberry River canyon. The railroad travels on tracks that pass along the edge of Tillamook Bay and the Oregon Coast, and through thick forest along the Nehalem River. The OCSR runs its collection of vintage rail equipment over 46 miles (74 km) of former Southern Pacific Transportation Company track under a lease from the Port of Tillamook Bay Railroad (POTB), an entity distinct from the OCSR.

== Stations ==
Station / Waypoint	Coordinates
Salmonberry River	45.75023°N 123.65302°W
Wheeler	45.68997°N 123.88213°W
Rockaway Beach	45.61301°N 123.94414°W
Garibaldi	45.55883°N 123.91175°W
Tillamook Air Museum	45.42031°N 123.80247°W

Garibaldi Station is the only station on the system equipped with a wheelchair lift.

== Railroad operations ==
=== General operating schedule—as of 2025 ===
- Early-Spring through mid-spring—Trains run on an 2-day, 3-day, or 4-day weekend service
- Mid-Spring through mid-Fall—Trains run every day
- Mid-Fall through Christmas—Trains run on an 2-day, 3-day, or 4-day weekend service
- January and February—No trains run

The above information is intended as a rough guide. Contact the company for details.

=== Excursions ===
Reservations are recommended.

Excursions are seasonal, and do not run all year round. Travel on some excursions where alcohol is served are age restricted. Current details are on the railroad's Web site.

Oregon Coastal Excursion is a 90-minute round trip between Garibaldi, OR and Rockaway Beach, OR and return. (Or between Rockaway Beach and Garibaldi and return.) It is 30 minutes each direction with a 30-minute layover. Passengers may stay longer and take any available return trip.

Spring Splendor Excursion and Fall Splendor Excursion are 2 1/4-hour round trips between Rockaway Beach, OR and Wheeler, OR. These excursions include a layover in Wheeler.

These descriptions are for reference only; check company website for specific trains details. Double check departure locations.

=== Special excursions ===
Reservations are required for all special event trains.

Moonlight Excursion is a romantic train ride from Garibaldi to Wheeler and return. Sandwiches and snacks are available for sale on this excursion; check the company web-site for details. Alcohol is served on this train—meaning this ride is only available to Passengers 21+ (This excursion usually does not include a layover in Wheeler.)

Wheeler Limited Excursion Picks up passengers in Garibald then Rockaway Beach before continuing to Wheeler. There is a layover in Wheeler. The train then returns passengers to Rockaway Beach then Garibaldi. Snacks are sometimes available in Wheeler during the layover.

Candy Cane Express is a 60-minute round trip between Garibaldi, Rockaway Beach, then return. There is no layover in Rockaway Beach.

Dinner Train This service was discontinued after the 2023 season. There are currently no plans to reintroduce this service in the near future. Sandwiches and snacks are usually available for sale on the Moonlight Excursion; check the company web-site for details.

Additional Seasonal Trains are offered at various times, including:

- Spring Break Excursion (similar to the 'Oregon Coastal Excursion')
- St. Patrick's Pub Train (21+)
- Easter Eggstravaganza Train
- Fourth of July Fireworks Spectacular
- Oktoberfest (21+)
- Halloween Coast Train (Departure location varies.)
- Rockaway Beach Tree Lighting

These descriptions are for reference only; check company website for specific trains details. Double check departure locations.

=== Special services ===
Cab Rides are available on most trains. For an additional fee, passengers can ride in the cab of a steam locomotive or diesel locomotive—as available. (Reservations are highly recommended. Restrictions apply.)

Caboose Rides Charter a caboose for a private experience (up to 10 passengers).

Charters Various locomotives and/or car configurations are available for private or semi-private charter.

One-way ticket Travel in one direction (no return) can be arranged by calling the railroad.

== Equipment ==
=== Locomotives ===
Locomotive details
Number	Image	Type	Built	Builder	Works number	Status	Notes
1		20-ton Class A Climax locomotive	1907	Climax Locomotive Works	804	Stored, awaiting restoration	Built for the Cascade Lumber Company, later served the Cabin Creek Lumber Company. To private owner Victor C. Monahan after retired in the 1970s, then donated to OCSR in 2024 by his family. Notable for being the world's only surviving standard gauge Class A Climax steam locomotive.
1		85-ton 3-truck Heisler	1913	Heisler Locomotive Works	1272	Stored, awaiting restoration	Built for the Sunset Timber Company of Raymond, Washington.
1		2-6-2T	1925	Baldwin Locomotive Works	58206	Stored, awaiting restoration	Built for the Anderson & Middleton Lumber Company, acquired by the Oregon, Pacific and Eastern Railway, to Fred M. Kepner in 1984, to the Oregon Coast Scenic following his death. Appeared in Emperor of the North Pole.
2		2-truck Heisler	1910	Heisler Locomotive Works	1198	Undergoing maintenance	Built for the Curtiss Lumber Co. of Mill City, Oregon.
3		2-truck Heisler	1917	Heisler Locomotive Works	1364	Stored, awaiting 1,472-day inspection	Built for Craig Mountain Lumber Co. Acquired from Rio Grande Scenic Railroad.
5		62-ton 2-truck Heisler	1922	Heisler Locomotive Works	1462	Stored, awaiting restoration	Built for the Buffelen Lumber Company of Tacoma, Washington. Was only in service for four years before crashing into Eagle Gorge, Washington. Recovered in 2002.
7		2-4-4-2	1909	Baldwin Locomotive Works	33463	Operational	Built as Little River Railroad 126, later Deep River Logging Co. 7 (nicknamed "The Skookum"). On loan from the Roots of Motive Power Museum (Willits, California), in service at the Niles Canyon Railway.
8		90-ton 3-truck Shay locomotive	1924	Lima Locomotive Works	3254	Stored, awaiting restoration	Built as Cascade Timber Co. (Reliance, Washington) 108, to Long-Bell Lumber Company 1008, then Pickering Lumber Co. 8 (2nd) (Standard, California). Later owned by Fred M. Kepner and sold to OCSR following his death.
23		28-ton 2-truck Shay locomotive	1887	Lima Locomotive Works	169	Stored, restoration suspended	Built for the Stimson Lumber Company.
25		2-6-2	1925	American Locomotive Company	66435	Operational	Built for the McCloud Railway. This locomotive is currently the railroad's first choice for steam power. The 25 chased four kids across the bridge in the famous scene from the film Stand by Me.
38		2-6-6-2	1934	Baldwin Locomotive Works	61781	Stored, awaiting restoration	Built for Weyerhaeuser Timber Co. Sold to the Sierra Railroad and renumbered 38 in 1952, to Rayonier Incorporated in 1955, to Fred M. Kepner in 1984, then to the OCSR following his death.
90		2-8-2	1926	Baldwin Locomotive Works	59071	Stored, awaiting restoration	Built for Polson Logging Company (bought out by Rayonier Inc. in 1948). Sold to the Oregon Memorial Steam Train Association in 1964.
101		GP9	1956	General Motors Electro-Motive Division	21703	Operational	Built as Chesapeake and Ohio Railway 6606; nicknamed "The Moo".
104		2-6-2	1923	Baldwin Locomotive Works	56851	Stored, awaiting restoration	Built for Oregon-American Lumber Company, sold to Long-Bell Lumber Company, then to International Paper, later to multiple private owners including Fred M. Kepner, and to OCSR following his death.
105		2-6-2T	1925	Baldwin Locomotive Works	58193	Stored, awaiting restoration	Built for Oregon-American Lumber Company, sold to Long-Bell Lumber Company, sold to International Paper, later multiple private owners including Fred M. Kepner, was shortly used by the Vernonia, South Park & Sunset Steam Railroad, and to OCSR following Kepner's death.
274		F7	1951	General Motors Electro-Motive Division	11066	Operational	Built for the Great Northern Railway; 567 engine upgraded with EMD 645 power blocks.
6139		SD9	1954	General Motors Electro-Motive Division	20121	Operational	Built as Chicago Burlington & Quincy 337. Last POTB SD9. Remainder scrapped.

=== Former units ===
Locomotive details
Number	Image	Type	Built	Builder	Works number	Status	Notes
100		2-8-2	1919	Baldwin Locomotive Works	Unknown	Under restoration	Sold to the Virginia and Truckee Railroad in 2022.
2		2-8-2	1912	Baldwin Locomotive Works	1198	Operational	Built for the Saginaw Timber Company in Brooklyn, Washington. Sold to the Albany and Eastern Railroad in 2022.

== Rail trail ==
In August 2025, the future of the railroad was in jeopardy when the City of Rockaway Beach requested that the POTB remove the tracks for a trail extension. The City argues that the Railroad's proposed "rails with trail" option is too costly.

== Incidents ==
=== 2007 Landslide ===
In December 2007, the Oregon Coast was struck by the Great Coastal Gale of 2007. Hurricane-force winds and torrential rain caused extensive damage to the railroad in the Salmonberry River Valley. More than 7 inches (180 mm) of rain fell in less than 24 hours. Flooding and landslides washed out several embankments and one large bridge. This caused a break in the line between the coastal areas and Banks, OR. The majority of the line is now isolated from the rest of the North American rail system—causing all rail-freight operations past this break to cease. The scenic, coastal areas (where tours are given) were largely unaffected. The estimate to reconnect the line was $57.3 million (2008 dollars) equivalent to $85,684,000 in 2025. It is unlikely that the Salmonberry River portion will be reopened anytime soon.

=== 2014 Salmonberry River disputes ===
In 2014, the OCSR was in a series of legal challenges with the State of Oregon over the railroad's attempts to reconstruct track in the Salmonberry River corridor. These tracks had been damaged during the winter storms of 2007. The central issue was the OCSR's work included placing rock fill on the bank of the river, for which they had not obtained state permits, potentially impacting native salmon and steelhead. OCSR's position was that as a railroad, federal law exempted them from state environmental regulations. In March 2015, a decision was reported that exempted the OCSR from the state regulations.

=== 2025 Tillamook trestle fire ===
On October 8, 2025, a wood trestle near Tillamook was damaged by fire and rendered impassable until it could be repaired or rebuilt. While it is not used by OCSR's regular excursions, it sits on a section of track connecting the excursion route with the railroad's main restoration facility. The blaze is currently under investigation by the local sheriff's office and the railroad has been in contact with state and federal law enforcement.

=== 2025 Tillamook Air Museum storm damage ===
On December 16, 2025—"Blimp Hangar B" (former Naval Air Station Tillamook) suffered wind damage; the Tillamook Air Museum was closed at that time. Rail operations were unaffected.

On August 20, 2026—The Port of Tillamook Bay Commissioners leased (and approved a future sale of) Blimp Hanger B and all the museum's aircraft to Vintage Aviation Museum. Vintage Aviation Museum is a Utah-based 501(c)(3) nonprofit organization.

On October 29th, 2026—the Tillamook Air Museum was reopened.

== See also ==
- List of heritage railroads in the United States
