= Shasta Sunset Dinner Train =

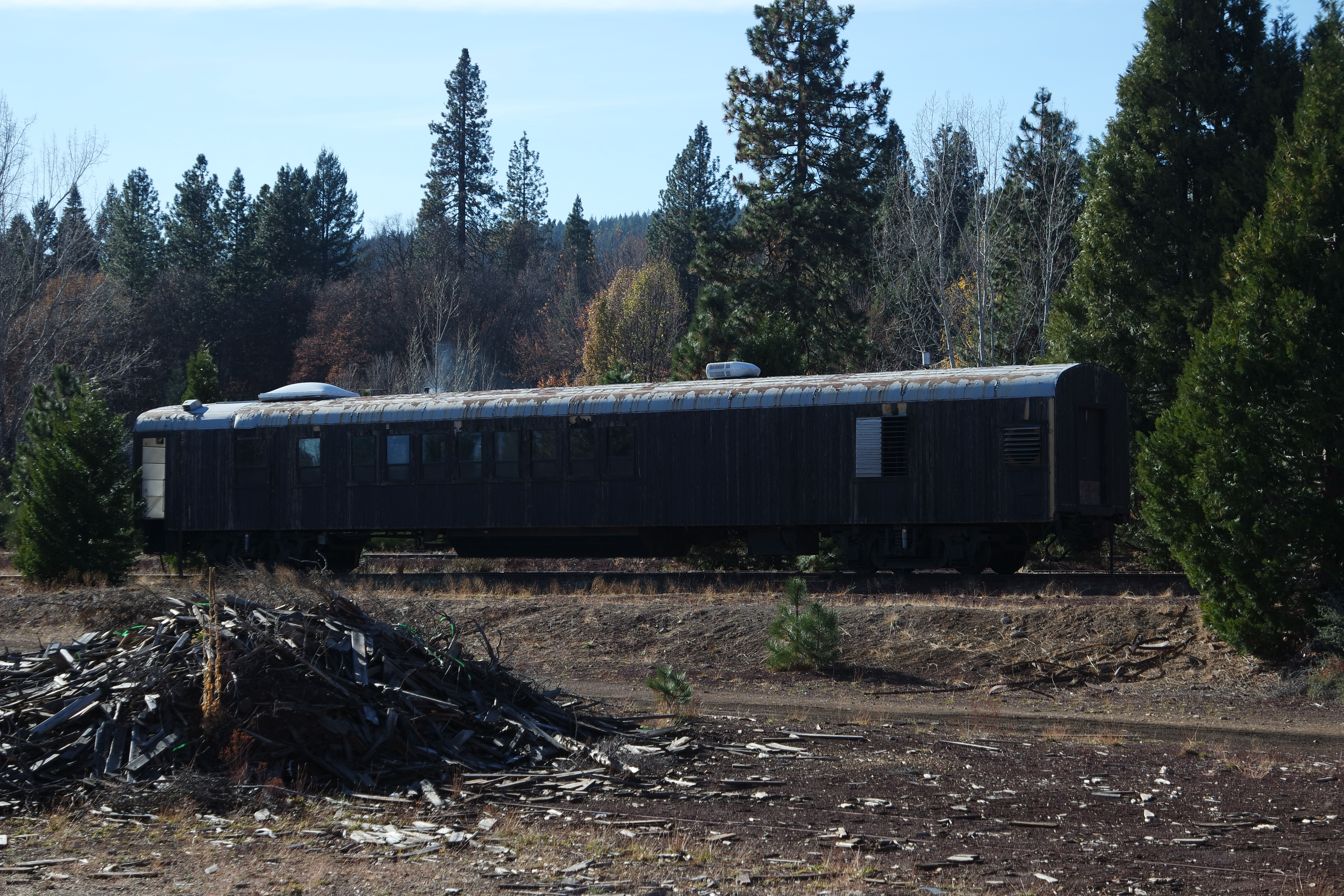
- One of a few passenger cars left on the railroad sits in the old McCloud Yard.

Overview
- Operator: McCloud Railway
- Headquarters: McCloud, California
- Dates of operation: 1996–2010

Technical
- Track gauge: 4 ft 8 1/2 in (1,435 mm)
- Length: 95.5 mi (153.7 km)

The Shasta Sunset Dinner Train was a scenic dinner train that was operated by the McCloud Railway that started in McCloud, California to Mt. Shasta City from 1996 to 2010. Before 2005, the train also saw service between McCloud and Bartle. After the McCloud Railway abandoned freight operations in 2006, the Shasta Sunset Dinner Train was one of a few passenger trains on the railroad that made a profit for the railroad. The Shasta Sunset Dinner Train ceased operations in 2010 because of the Great Recession with a few passenger cars left on McCloud Railway property.

== History ==
=== Beginnings ===
After the McCloud Railway took over operations of the former McCloud River Railroad, the line was an industrial railroad hauling sugar beets, lumber, and various other freight. Passenger service was never considered by the railroad. However, locals and many in the railroad wanted to try excursion service. The first of this was in 1994 when Yreka Western #19 traveled from Yreka to Mt. Shasta City and took a couple excursions between McCloud, Burney, and Hambone. Seeing the success of the trips with #19 and in addition with suggestions from locals, the railroad started making plans for a dinner train service. They purchased two former Illinois Central passenger cars from a defunct museum collection to use on the new service between McCloud and Mt. Shasta City to the west and McCloud to Bartle to the east.

=== Inauguration ===
In June 1996, the Shasta Sunset Dinner Train started service with the two renovated passenger cars serving Saturday nights. The new operation got a huge boost almost immediately when Malcolm Glover, a McCloud native who had become a popular reporter in San Francisco, penned a glowing review of the dinner train in one of the city's papers. In the article, Glover, writing for the San Francisco Gate, stated, "In two beautifully renovated 1916 passenger / diner cars, guests are treated to a four-course dinner served on tables covered with white linen tablecloths, china plates and sterling silver settings. Lace valances decorate the windows, which offer outstanding views as the train winds its way through the forest". The railroad almost immediately purchased three more cars, two more former Illinois Central heavyweights and a former Milwaukee Road coach; the heavyweights allowed the dinner train to expand from one to four cars within a year, and the railroad installed a generator to provide house power, a small gift shop, and a lounge area in the former Milwaukee car. By 1998, the dinner train was so popular that the railroad bought more Illinois Central passenger cars, one of which the railroad converted into a depot for the dinner train while the shops rebuilt the other two into state of the art dancing cars. The train had the railroad's open air passenger cars attached to the train during the summer months and the all heavyweight consist during the winter due to the snowy weather in and around Mt. Shasta.

After the expansion in passenger cars, the dinner train ran more frequently with Thursday and Friday nights in the summer. At certain times during the year, the railroad would also have a theme to some of the dinner trains like western music or melodrama. The dinner train also ran Mother's Day, New Year's Eve, Valentine's Day, and 4th of July trains. The Shasta Sunset Dinner Train's revenue was the greatest asset to the McCloud Railway. This was because of the declining revenue of freight trains and the little money made from the steam excursions with McCloud River Railroad #25 and McCloud River Railroad #18 in addition with the diesel locomotives hauling some of the other excursions.

=== Decline ===
By the early 2000s, the Shasta Sunset Dinner Train had ended services to Bartle. This was due to the freight trains on the railroad losing money consistently since the 1990s. On June 27, 2005, the railroad applied with the Surface Transportation Board to abandon all MCR track beyond 3.3 miles (5.3 km) east of McCloud. With the abandonment of the Burney branch and the mainline to Bartle and Hambone, the dinner train ceased operations east of McCloud and only ran trains to Mt. Shasta City. With the unstable financial situation of the McCloud Railway, the train was the railroad's only source of revenue.

Unfortunately, because of the Great Recession had passenger numbers plummeting. Ridership, which had been at or above 15,000 people per year, took a nosedive to only 8,000 people in 2008, and by the middle months of 2009, the railroad foresaw only 6,500 people would show up that year to ride. Thus, the McCloud Railway announced that the dinner train would cease operations at the end of 2009, which would in turn end the McCloud Railway. But a spike in demand from those wanting one last ride prompted the railroad to add several more trips, and the final dinner train operated on Saturday, January 16, 2010.

== Equipment ==
=== Locomotives ===
Locomotive details
Number	Images	Type	Notes
36/38		SD-38	Since these locomotives were the backbone of the railroad, they were the most common to pull the Shasta Sunset Dinner during the regular season and during the winter.
18		2-8-2	No. 18 would sometimes haul the train for special occasions, but it never hauled it regularly until the sale of the locomotive in 2004.
25		2-6-2	No. 25 only hauled the train once during Labor Day Weekend of 1997.
