= McCloud Railway 25 =

Preserved American 2-6-2 locomotive

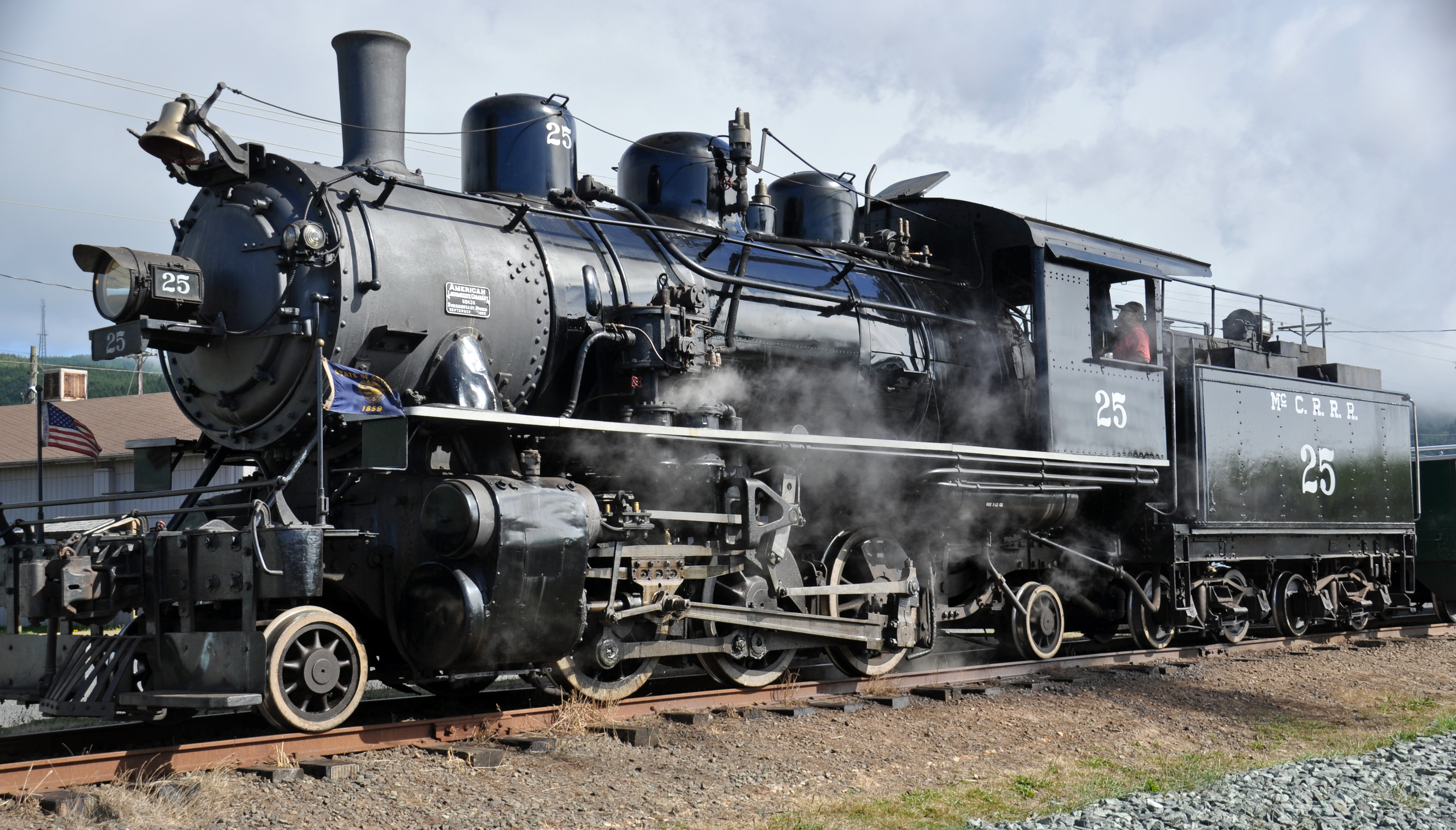
- No. 25 on the Oregon Coast Scenic Railroad on August 2, 2012
Type and origin
- Power type: Steam
- Builder: American Locomotive Company (Schenectady Works)
- Serial number: 66435
- Build date: September 1925
Specifications
- Configuration
  - Whyte: 2-6-2
  - UIC: 1'C1'
- Gauge: 4 ft 8 1/2 in (1,435 mm)
- Driver dia.: 46 in (1.168 m)
- Wheelbase: 25 ft 8 in (7.82 m)
- Adhesive weight: 119,000 lb (54,000 kg)
- Loco weight: 144,000 lb (65.3 t)
- Total weight: 455,260 lb (206.5 t)
- Fuel type: Oil
- Fuel capacity: 1,800 US gal (6,800 L; 1,500 imp gal)
- Water cap.: 4,000 US gal (15,000 L; 3,300 imp gal)
- Boiler pressure: 180 psi (1.24 MPa)
- Cylinders: Two, outside
- Cylinder size: 19 in × 24 in (483 mm × 610 mm)
- Valve gear: Walschaerts
- Valve type: Piston valves
- Loco brake: Air
- Train brakes: Air
- Couplers: Knuckle
Performance figures
- Tractive effort: 28,800 lbf (128.1 kN)
Career
- Operators: McCloud Railway; Shasta Sunset Dinner Train; Mt. Shasta Alpine Scenic Railroad (leased); Great Western Railroad Museum (leased); Oregon Coast Scenic Railroad
- Class: 24
- Number in class: 4th of 4
- Numbers: MCR 25
- Retired: July 3, 1955
- Restored: June 9, 1962
- Current owner: Oregon Coast Scenic Railroad
- Disposition: Operational

McCloud Railway 25 is a 24 class 2-6-2 "Prairie" type steam locomotive, built in September 1925 by the American Locomotive Company's (ALCO) Schenectady Works for the McCloud River Railroad (MCR). Shortly after retirement, on July 3, 1955, the No. 25 ceremoniously opened the Burney Branch by bursting through a paper banner with a special excursion train. In 1962, No. 25 was restored for excursion service and served in that capacity until passenger service was once again terminated in 1975. It has since been used in the films Bound for Glory and Stand By Me. It is presently in Oregon, providing excursion service on the Oregon Coast Scenic Railroad (OCSR).

== History ==
=== Revenue service ===
No. 25 was built in September 1925 by the American Locomotive Company's (ALCO) Schenectady Works in Schenectady, New York, it was one of four Prairies from ALCO, numbered 22–25, which were purchased for a total cost of $90,000. The No. 25 was the last new steam locomotive purchased by the McCloud Railway (MCR). At the time, the McCloud was a logging railway and the No. 25 was used in this function until early summer 1955, when it was replaced by GE 70-ton switcher No. 1.

=== Post excursions ===
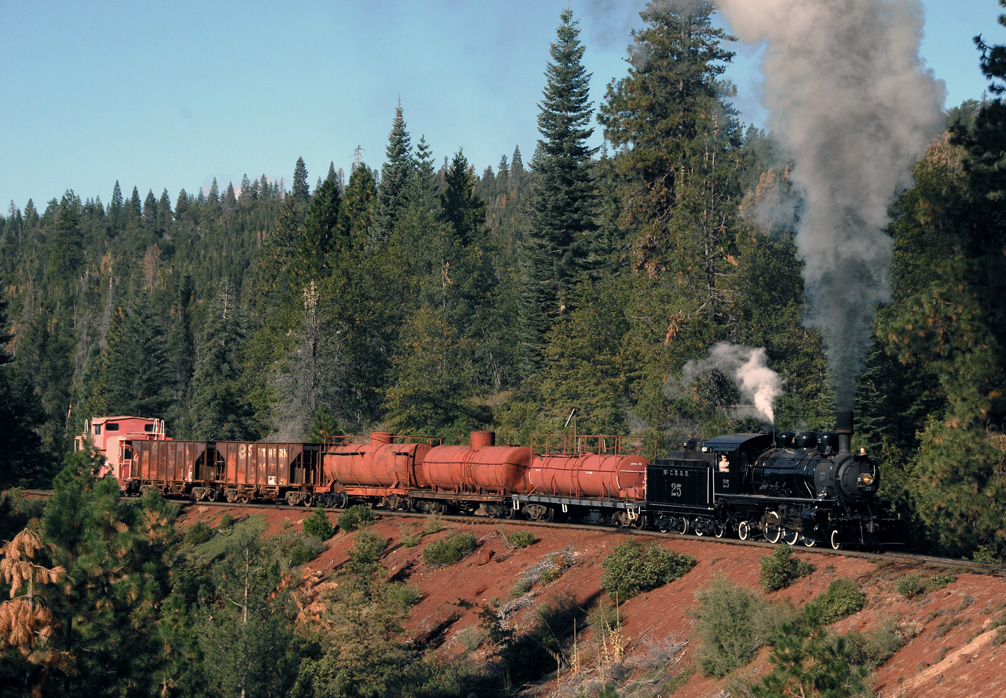
McCloud Railway No. 25 hauling a freight train on the McCloud, October 11, 2008

It wasn't long, however, before the locomotive was brought out again on July 3, 1955 to open the Burney Branch by breaking a paper banner with a special excursion train. After this, however, the locomotive was truly retired, but it remained on the property—the only steam locomotive to do so.

In the following years, there were many requests for the No. 25 to be restored to operating condition for excursion service, which work officially began in the spring of 1962. The locomotive return to service on June 9, 1962 where it led a long doubleheader excursion train with No. 19, from McCloud to its former haunts at Pondosa and return. A contractor called the Mt. Shasta Alpine Scenic Railroad leased the engine and ran regular excursions in the summer of 1964, and another contractor called the Shasta Huffen-Puff ran the service between 1967 and 1971. This era of excursions ended in 1975, when the locomotive travelled to the Tidewater Southern Railway to be used in Bound for Glory, after filming was completed, No. 25 was withdrawn from service and put into storage.

The McCloud River Railroad came under new ownership in 1977, and the new owners ordered President Bill Herndon to scrap the No. 25, but he resisted. Herndon however, balked at the order, and negotiated back and forth with Itel, he eventually received permission to put the locomotive on public static display at McCloud River Railroad. However, before these plans could be brought to fruition, the Great Western Railroad Museum approached the railroad with a proposal to lease and operate the No. 25.

=== Great Western Railroad Museum ===
The GWRM began rebuilding the engine to operation between late winter of 1981 and early 1982, the No. 25 eventually returned to service on May 8, 1982 and began hauling excursions for GWRM and hauled two annual fundraiser excursion trains between McCloud and Mt. Shasta City for the Mt. Shasta High School. This service ended with a performance in a movie Stand by Me, filmed in 1986, No. 25 would be withdrawn from service once again and put into storage. Right after this, the GWRM sued the McCloud River Railroad for Breach of Contract, and in the settlement, obtained possession of the locomotive. They did not do anything with it, however, keeping it in storage on the McCloud property.

=== Return to McCloud Railway ===
The renewed McCloud Railway (MR) re-obtained the No. 25 in January 1996 and began rebuilding it to operational condition. The locomotive returned to service under steam again on Labor Day weekend in 1997. No. 25 would return to occasional excursion service for the railroad, such as hauling the Shasta Sunset Dinner Train once during Labor Day of 1997. But in February 2001, McCloud Railway 18 re-entered service, and after a doubleheader excursion, the No. 18 would replace the No. 25 due to the railroad could only afford to run just one engine, No. 25 was once again withdrawn from service after this excursion and put into storage.

It remained in storage for six and a half years until the summer of 2007 when a movie production team began rebuilding it to alternate its appearance for an unknown movie role, however, the plan to use No. 25 for the production of the unnamed movie never went through and No. 25 was once again put into storage.

The following year, No. 25 was rebuilt and return to excursion service for the McCloud in the summer of 2008, where it was altered back to its original appearance. It made two excursions for railfan groups on November 1st and 2nd, but because most of the McCloud Railway is being abandoned, the locomotive ran on its homerails for the last time, and was put up for sale.

=== Oregon Coast Scenic Railroad ===
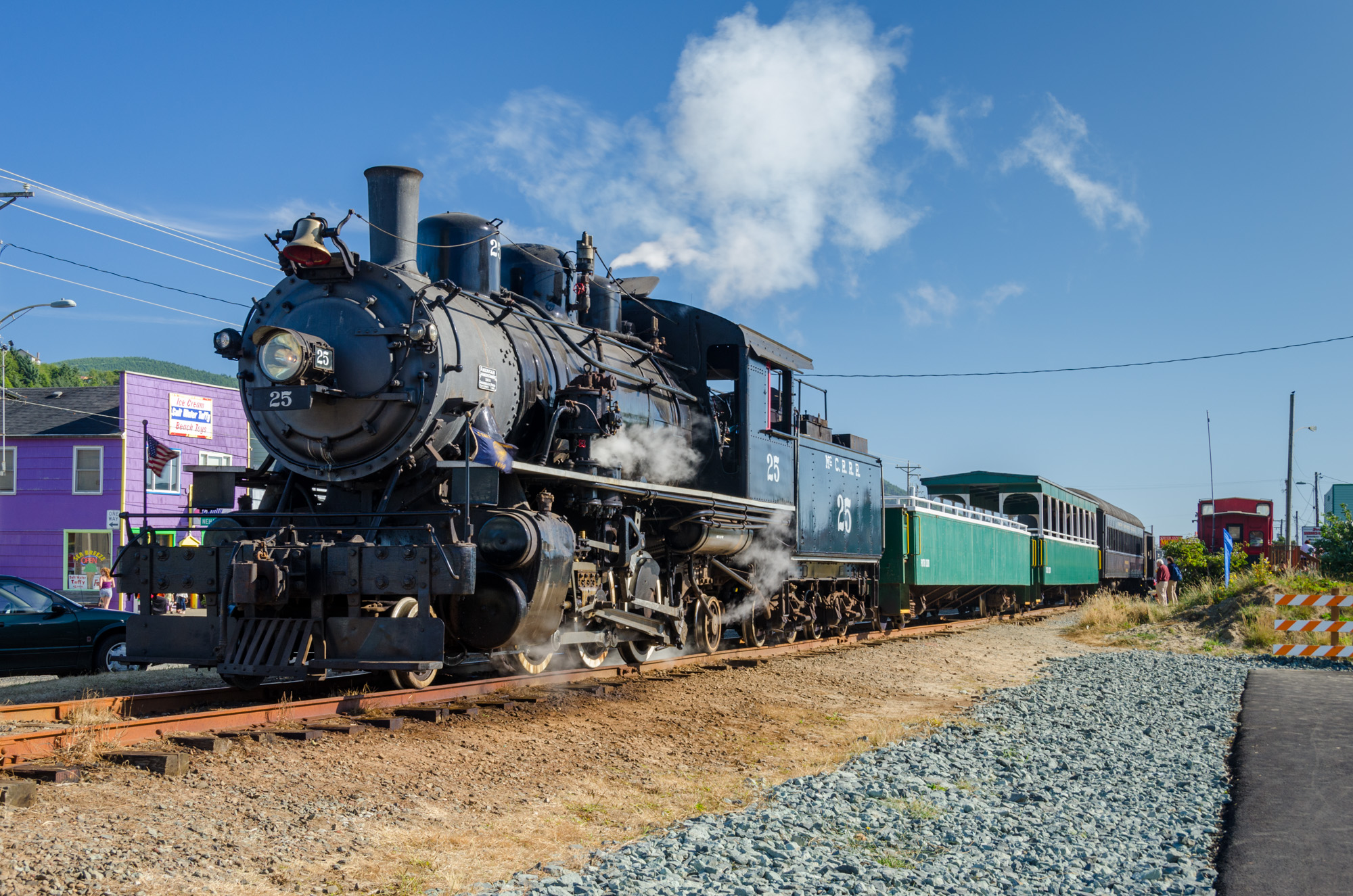
No. 25 hauling an excursion train on the Oregon Coast Scenic Railroad, August 30, 2012

In late March 2011, No. 25 was moved from McCloud, California to Tillamook, Oregon after it was purchased by the Oregon Coast Scenic Railroad (OCSR). The locomotive was stored in the World War II-era blimp hangar and was steamed up on May 20th with passenger excursions planned to begin in the summer. It was moved to the Oregon Coast Scenic Railroad shop in Garibaldi, Oregon in July 2011 where it received an overhaul and began hauling tourist trains for the railroad.

On December 20, 2022, No. 25 was taken out of service to undergo its Federal Railroad Administration (FRA) 1,472-day inspection and overhaul. It returned to service in July 2024.

== See also ==
- Columbia River Belt Line 7
- McCloud Railway 18
- McCloud Railway 19
- Polson Logging Co. 2
- Sierra Railway 28
