= Oregon, Pacific and Eastern 19 =

Preserved American 2-8-2 locomotive

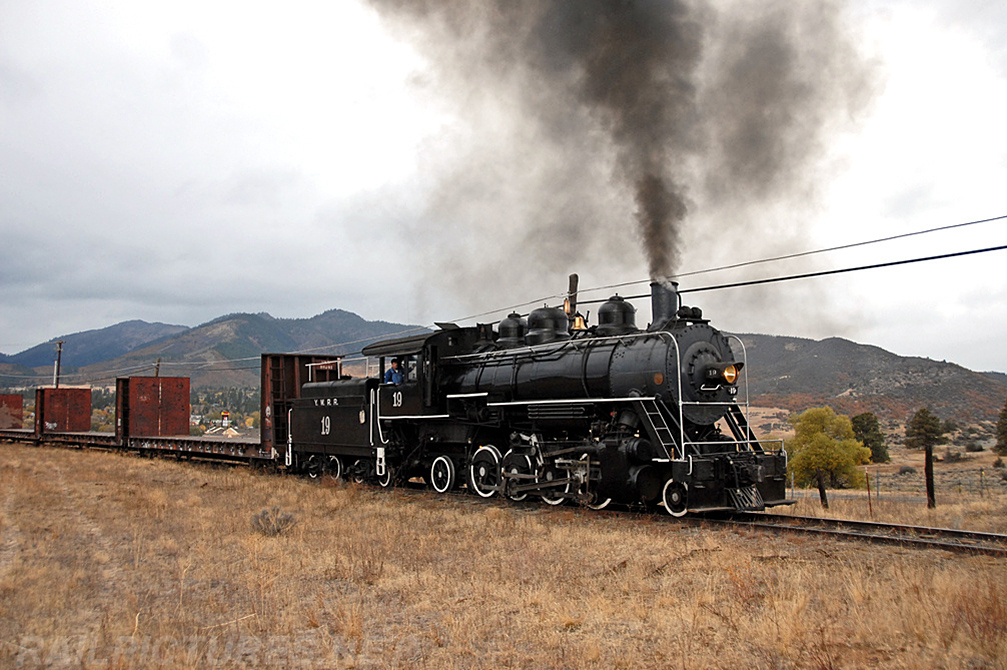
- No. 19 hauling a flatcar train on the Yreka Western, November 1, 2008
Type and origin
- Power type: Steam
- Builder: Baldwin Locomotive Works
- Serial number: 42000
- Build date: April 1915
Specifications
- Configuration
  - Whyte: 2-8-2
- Gauge: 1,435 mm (4 ft 8 1/2 in)
- Driver dia.: 48 in (1.219 m)
- Loco weight: 178,400 lb (80.9 t)
- Tender weight: 55,000 lb (25,000 kg)
- Fuel type: New: Coal; Now: Oil
- Fuel capacity: Coal: 10 t (9.8 long tons; 11 short tons); Oil: 6,040 US gal (22,900 L; 5,030 imp gal)
- Water cap.: 4,000 US gal (15,000 L; 3,300 imp gal)
- Tender cap.: Original tender: 5,000 US gal (19,000 L; 4,200 imp gal); New tender: 4,000 US gal (15,000 L; 3,300 imp gal)
- Boiler pressure: 180 psi
- Cylinders: Two, outside
- Cylinder size: 20 in × 28 in (508 mm × 711 mm)
- Valve gear: Walschaerts
- Valve type: Piston valves
- Loco brake: Air
- Train brakes: Air
- Couplers: Knuckle
Performance figures
- Maximum speed: 60 mph (97 km/h)
- Tractive effort: 36,680 lbf (163.16 kN)
Career
- Operators: Caddo and Choctaw Railroad; United States Smelting, Refining and Mining Company; Cia de Real del Monte y Pachuca Railroad; McCloud Railway; Yreka Western Railroad; Oregon, Pacific and Eastern Railway (leased); Age of Steam Roundhouse
- Numbers: C&CRR 4; USSR&MC 2069; CRMP 105; MCR 19; YW 19; OPE 19
- Nicknames: R.L Rowan; Pancho
- Retired: June 8, 1953 (revenue service); November 2008 (1st excursion service)
- Restored: 1955 (1st excursion service); March 13, 2026 (2nd excursion service)
- Current owner: Age of Steam Roundhouse
- Disposition: Operational

Oregon, Pacific and Eastern 19 is a preserved 2-8-2 "Mikado" type steam locomotive, built in April 1915 by the Baldwin Locomotive Works (BLW) for the Caddo and Choctaw Railroad (C&CRR) in Arkansas. The locomotive also operated for the United States Smelting, Refining and Mining Company (USSR&MC), McCloud River Railroad (MCR), Yreka Western Railroad (YW), and the Oregon, Pacific, and Eastern Railway (OPE). The engine operated in Mexico before being sold to the McCloud River Railroad and then to the Yreka Western Railroad, before being moved up to Cottage Grove, Oregon to run on the OP&E in excursion service. In the late 1980s, No. 19 was sent back down to Yreka, California to run on the YW after the financial collapse of the OP&E. In April 1994, the engine returned to McCloud, California to run a series of excursions on the McCloud Railway. It has since been used in the films Emperor of the North Pole and Stand By Me. As of 2026, No. 19 is operational at the Age of Steam Roundhouse in Sugarcreek, Ohio.

== History ==
=== Revenue service ===
No. 19 was built by the Baldwin Locomotive Works (BLW) in April 1915 as Caddo and Choctaw Railroad (C&CRR) No. 4, it was Baldwin's 42,000th locomotive produced. The locomotive was also christened with the name of R.L Rowan; an engineer on the railroad. In the early 1920s, No. 4 was sold to the Choctaw River Lumber Company while still retaining its No. 4. The engine worked in Arkansas until 1920, when the locomotive was sold off to the United States Smelting, Refining and Mining Company, based out of Boston, Massachusetts, there it was renumbered to No. 2069 and worked hauling lead ore from the mine to the smelter yard.

The engine was then sold to the Cia de Real del Monte y Pachuca Railroad in Pachuca, Mexico, a silver rich region northeast of Mexico City, where it was repainted, re-lettered and renumbered as their No. 105. Around the time that the engine was sent to Mexico, it was converted to burn oil instead of coal. It was also while the engine was in Mexico that it got its nickname. It was rumored that the engine and Pancho Villa had a run in during the Mexican Revolution. Thus the engine was bestowed the nickname, Pancho.

After a four-year stint in Mexico, No. 105 was again sold to the McCloud River Railroad (MCR) in McCloud, California in January 1923, which renumbered the engine to No. 19 as they had an identical locomotive to No. 19, No. 18, also originally for the Caddo and Choctaw Railroad. It was also revealed that when the crews in McCloud were fixing and repainting the locomotive in 1923, bullet holes were discovered in the locomotive's cab and exterior, possibly indicating the engine had been close to battles during the engine's time in Mexico. The engine was placed into service in August 1923 and worked in regular service on the McCloud River Railroad until it was purchased by the Yreka Western Railroad (YW) three decades later on June 8, 1953, when the railroad began acquiring diesel locomotives.

=== Excursion service ===
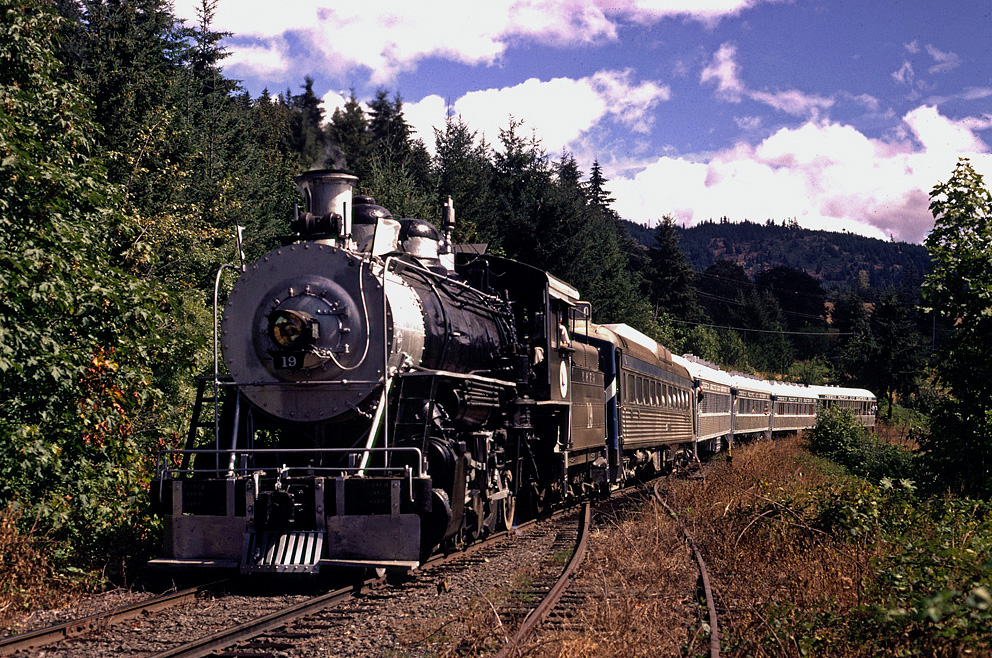
No. 19 hauling an excursion train in the 1970s

Upon arrival at YW, the railroad decided to tap into the steam excursion potential and in 1955, took both former McCloud River Railroad 18 and 19 for excursions between Yreka and Montague, however No. 19 remained in regular service. In 1958, No. 19 was replaced by diesel locomotives again, but still continued in excursion service. On June 9, 1962, No. 19 ran a long doubleheader excursion train with recently restored McCloud Railway 25, from McCloud to Pondosa and return. It continued to haul excursion trains for YW until 1970, when it was put into storage. That same year while still owned by YW, No. 19 was leased for summertime excursion service in Oregon on the Oregon, Pacific and Eastern Railway (OPE) of Cottage Grove, Oregon. It was while the engine was in Oregon that No. 19 was used in the filming for the 1976 United Artists film, Bound for Glory, loosely based on Woody Guthrie's life. In 1986, No. 19, along with former McCloud River Railroad 25, were used in Rob Reiner's film, Stand By Me, adapted from Stephen King's book, The Body. In 1988, the OP&E was abandoned and No. 19 returned to the Yreka Western and began hauling excursion trains again in 1989.

In April 1994, No. 19 returned to McCloud, California, to operate on the McCloud Railway (MR). No. 19 returned to Yreka and operated on the railroad until November 1, 2008, when the engine was taken out of service. However, that would be the last time No. 19 operated on the Yreka Western as the railroad ceased operations that same year. On October 14, 2013, it was announced that No. 19 would be auctioned off on October 25, but a lawsuit was filed against the railroad on that date causing the sale to be postponed indefinitely.

On October 5, 2016, No. 19 was seized by the Siskiyou County Sheriff's Office and was eventually put up for auction again. At the auction, two railroad enthusiasts attended the auction to buy No. 19, two of them were Dennis Daugherty, the representing train enthusiast of Jerry Jacobson of the Age of Steam Roundhouse in Sugarcreek, Ohio and the other was J. David Conrad, the chief mechanical officer and vice president of the Valley Railroad in Essex, Connecticut, Conrad stated that he originally planned to purchase No. 19 at the auction and use it as a back up engine to the Valley Railroad's steam motive power. It was eventually sold to Dennis Daugherty of the Age of Steam Roundhouse for a bid of $400,000. It arrived to the Age of Steam Roundhouse on June 2, 2017, where it was cosmetically restored and put on display.

In 2020, the museum began work on its FRA 1,472-day inspection and restoration to return the engine to operating condition. On March 16, 2026, No. 19's restoration was completed and the engine, now relettered as OPE, made its first test run over the Ohio Central Railroad's trackage and return. No. 19 hauled its first inaugural freight run on April 9, 2026 and was displayed on April 10 for the grand steam christening event; the following day, it hauled its first excursion train at the Age of Steam Roundhouse.

== Appearances in media ==
- No. 19 is heavily used in the 1973 Robert Aldrich film Emperor of the North Pole; which is about a struggle between a hobo named "A No. 1" (played by Lee Marvin) and a conductor named Shack (played by Ernest Borgnine) taking place on No. 19.
- No. 19 also makes an appearance in the 1986 Rob Reiner film Stand by Me; the locomotive was used in a scene where one of the main characters plays chicken with it.

== See also ==
- California Western 45
- Columbia River Belt Line 7
- Lake Superior and Ishpeming 33
- McCloud Railway 25
- Polson Logging Co. 2
- Valley Railroad 40
