= McCloud Railway =

Railroad operated around Mount Shasta, California

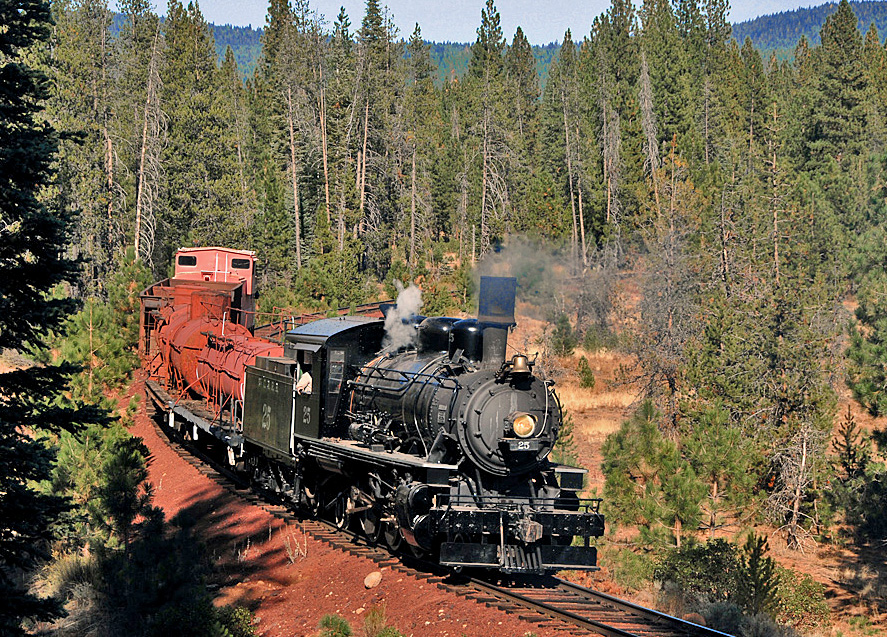
- No. 25 hauling a freight train in 2008.

Overview
- Headquarters: McCloud, California
- Reporting mark: MCR/MR
- Locale: Mount Shasta, California
- Dates of operation: 1897–2010
- Successor: McCloud Railway Company

Technical
- Track gauge: 4 ft 8 1/2 in (1,435 mm)
- Length: 95.5 miles (153.7 km)

The McCloud Railway (reporting mark MCR), also previously known as the McCloud River Railroad, was a class III railroad operated around Mount Shasta, California, it was incorporated on January 21, 1897, and began operations on August 1, 1897.

The MCR provided both freight service as well as passenger excursion trains like the Shasta Sunset Dinner Train.

Freight traffic consisted of outbound lumber and forest products as well as diatomaceous earth. Approximately 3,000 carloads of freight (1996 estimate) were handled annually.

The MCR interchanged with the Union Pacific (formerly Southern Pacific) at Mount Shasta, California, and the BNSF (formerly the Burlington Northern, née Great Northern Railway) at Lookout, California.

On June 27, 2005, the railroad applied with the Surface Transportation Board to abandon all MCR track beyond 3.3 miles (5.3 km) east of McCloud.

During the railroad's last stand during 2009 and 2010, their only source of revenue was due to the Shasta Sunset Dinner Train. However, due to the Great Recession, the railroad shut down in January 2010, selling off the last steam locomotive, McCloud River Railroad #25, and also sold off all but two of their diesel locomotives. The railroad stayed shut down but not abandoned through the rest of the 2010s.

== Route ==
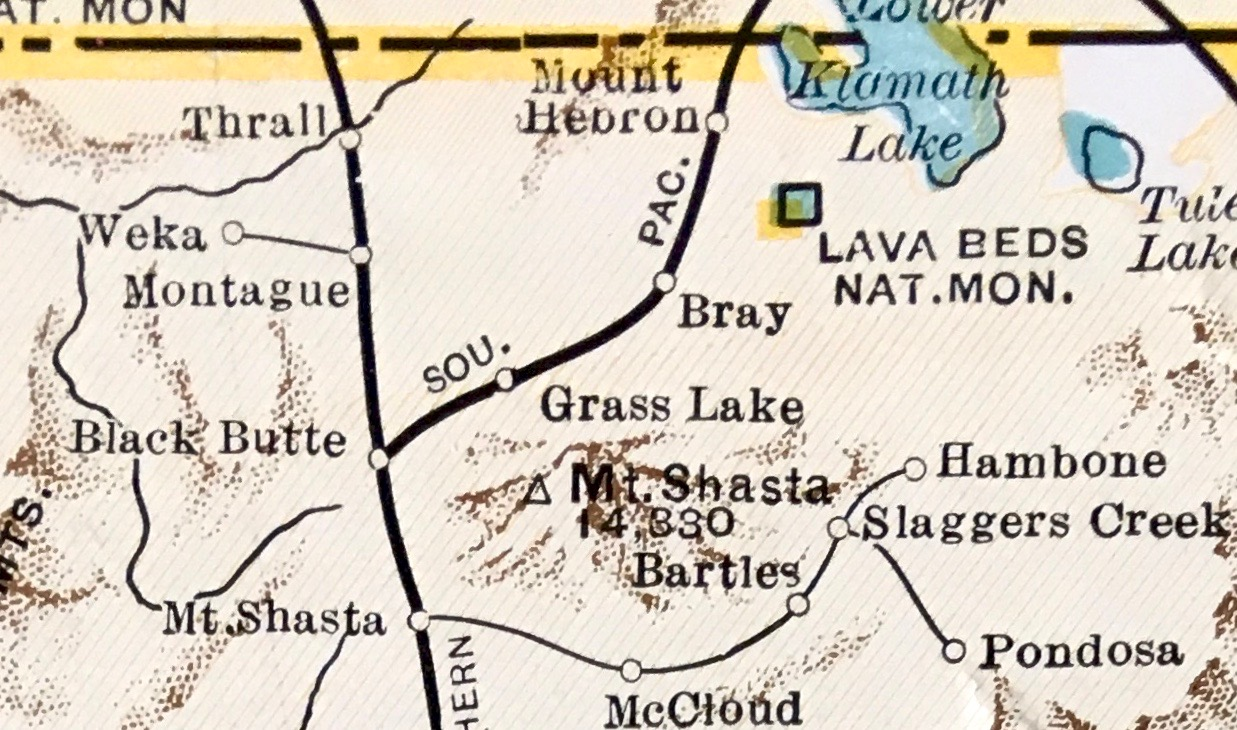
Route in 1931

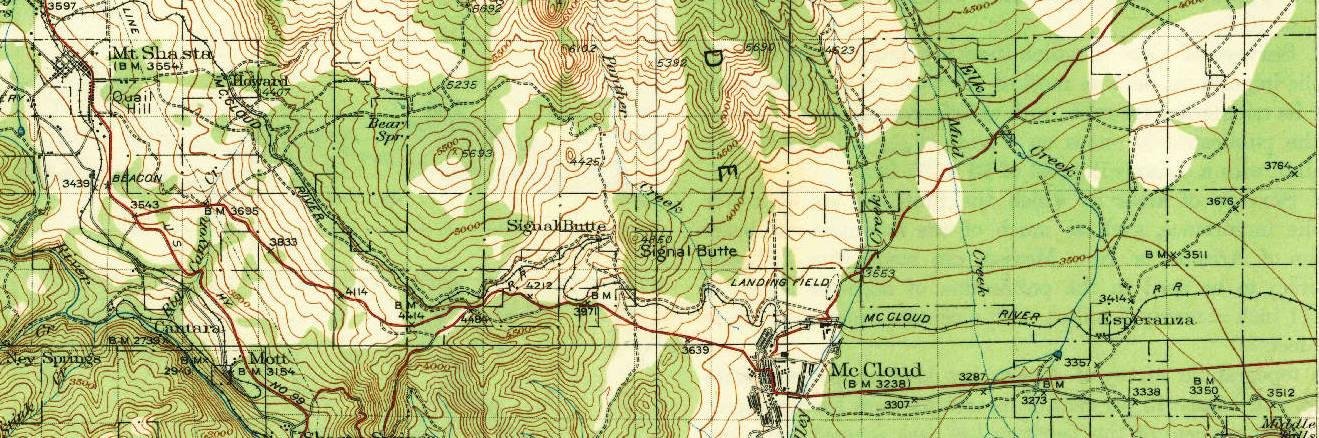
McCloud rail route from Mt Shasta to McCloud in 1935

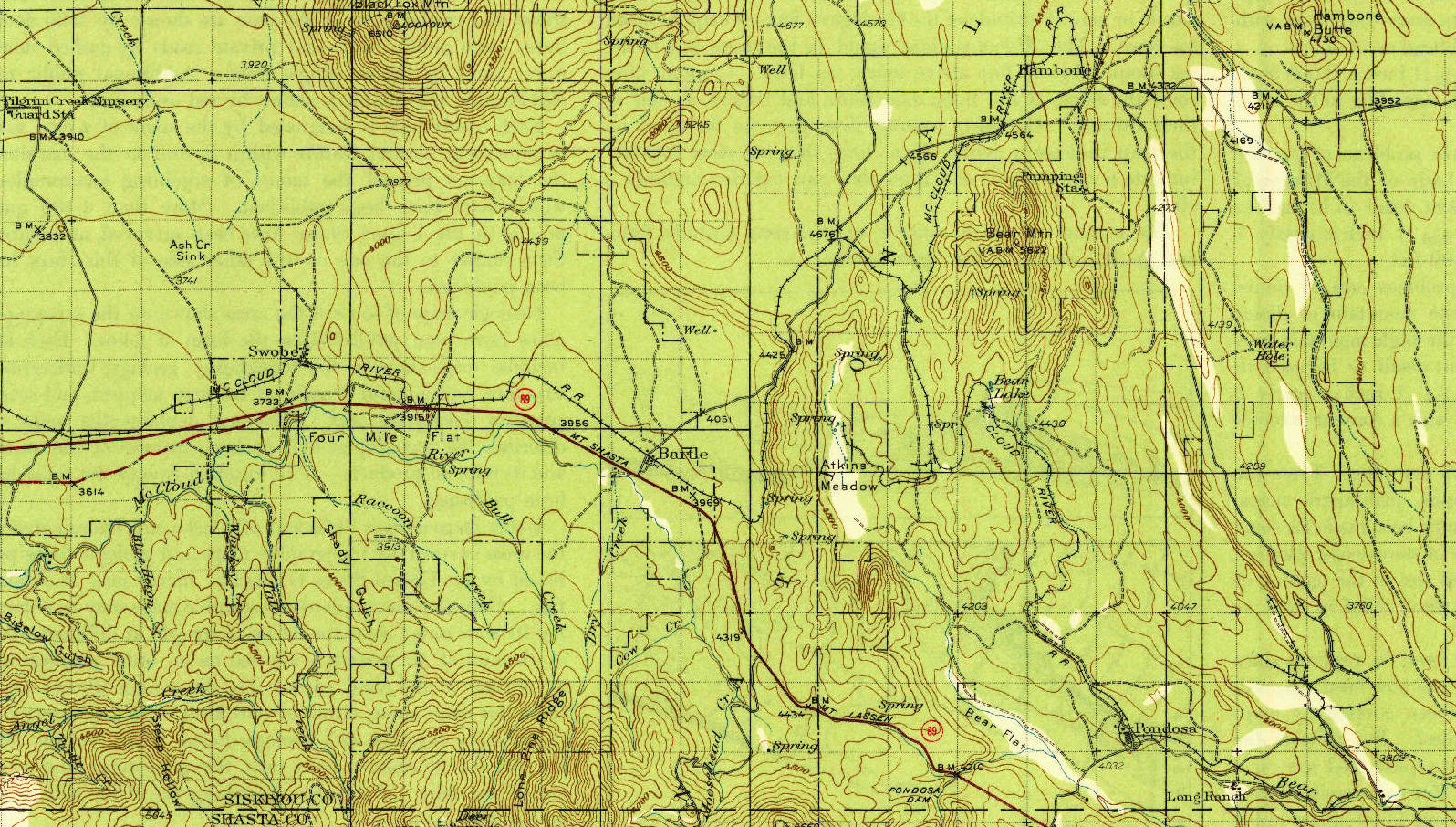
Eastern portion of route in 1939

The railroad operated on 95.5 miles (153.7 km) of track. The principal line ran from Mount Shasta to Bartle. At Bartle, the Burney Branch headed south. The MCR also had a 19-mile (31 km) branch running from Bartle to Hambone. At Hambone the ownership changed to BNSF (Great Northern) but was operated by the McCloud River Railroad. That line extended to Lookout Junction where it connected with the Great Northern Railway mainline just north of Bieber.

== History ==
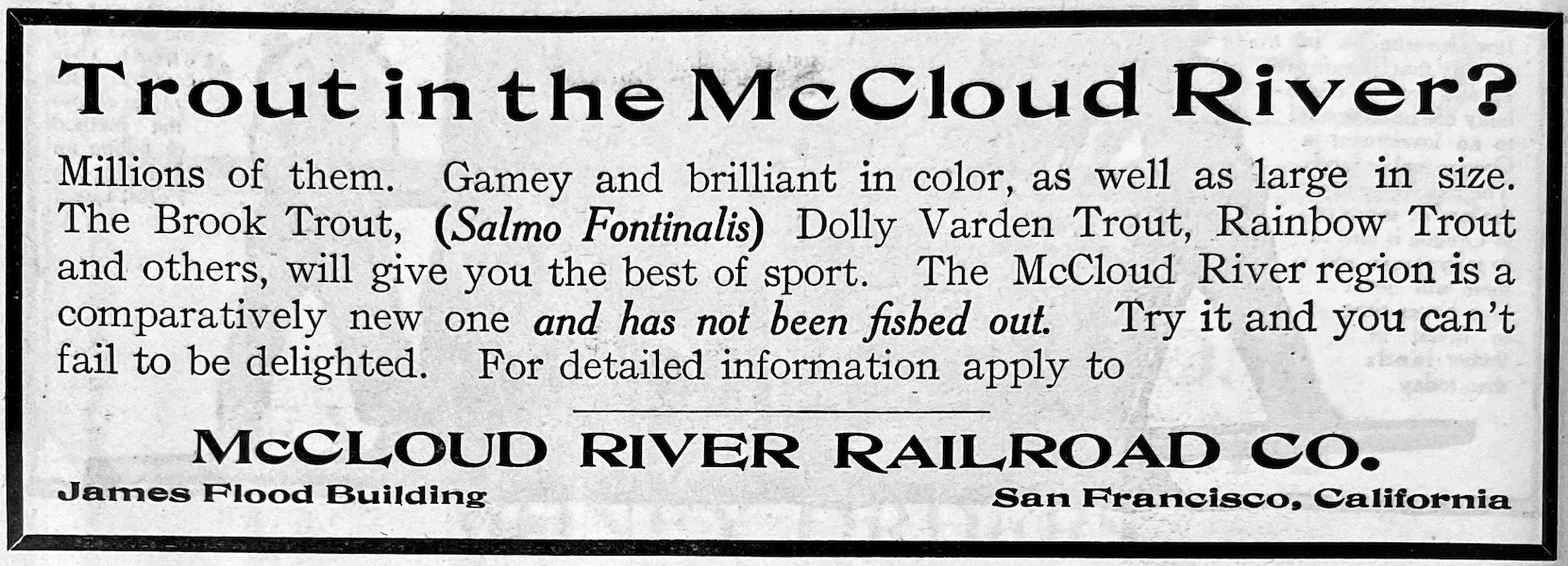
Early advertisement baiting tourists in 1907

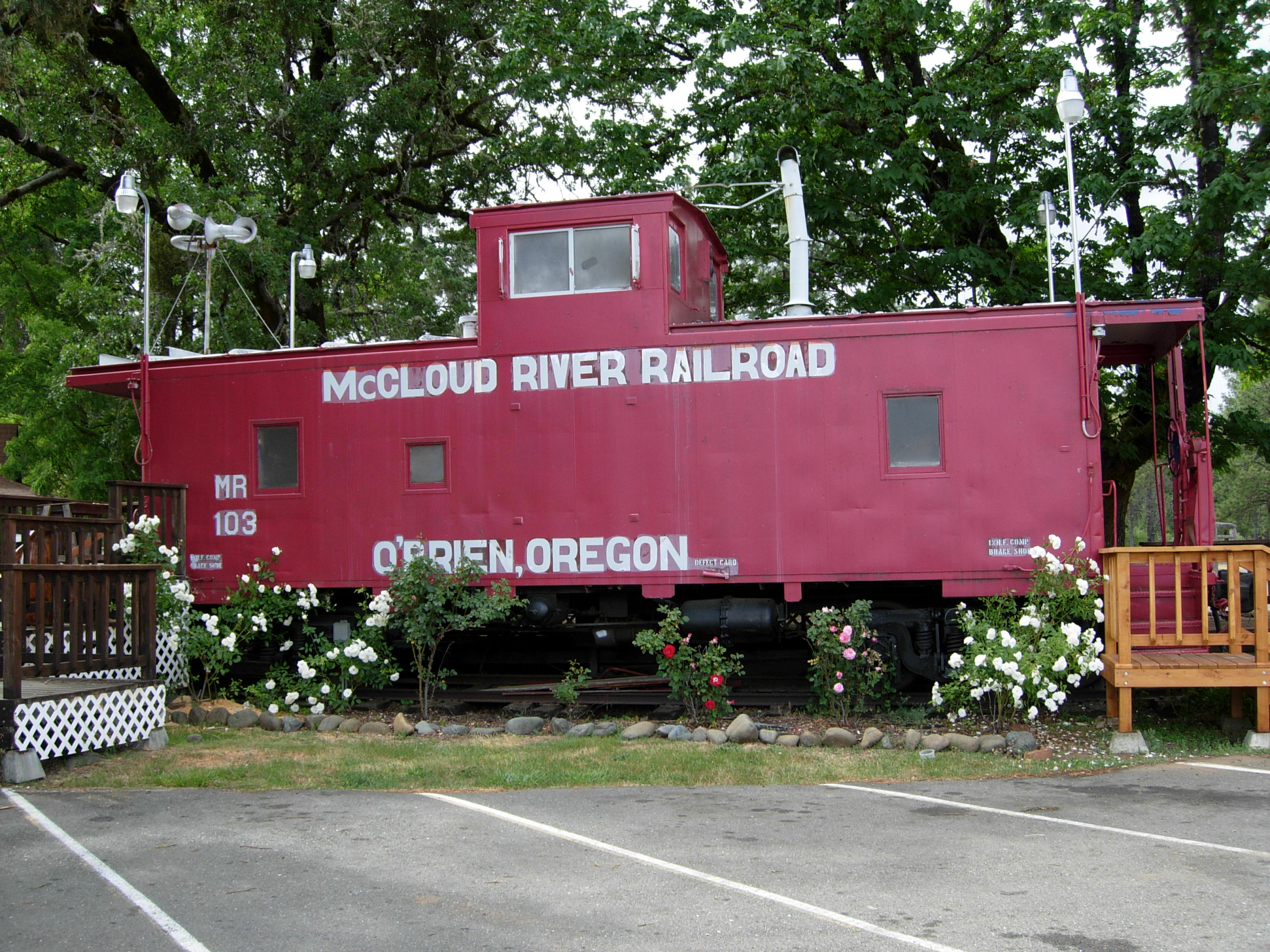
A retired caboose in O'Brien, Oregon.

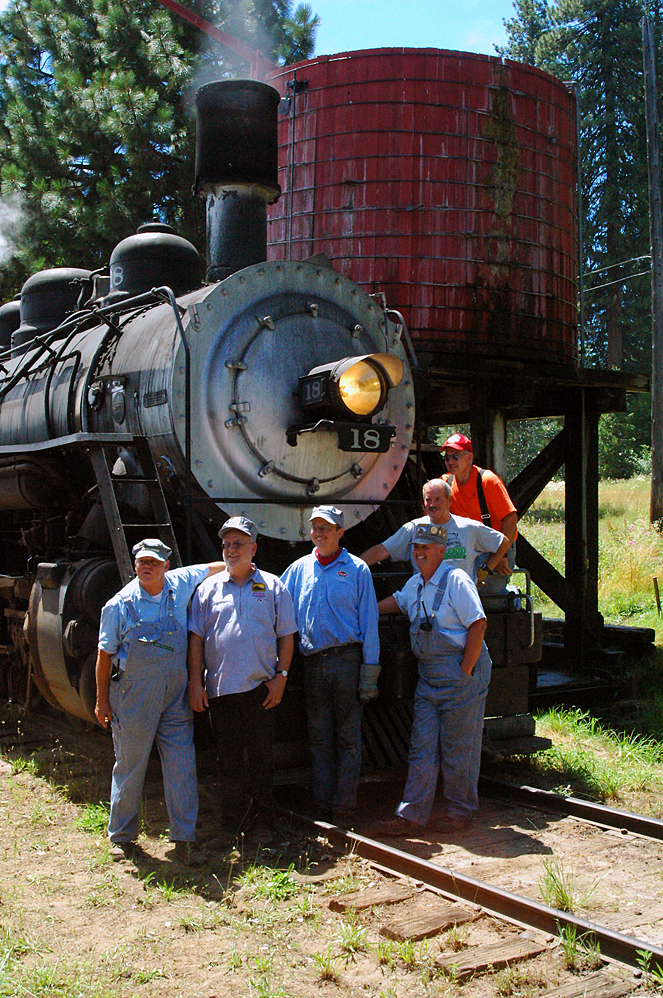
Last crew of McCloud #18, August 7th, 2005.

The MCR was originally built as the McCloud River Railroad chartered on January 21, 1897, it officially began operations on August 1, 1897 as a forest railway bringing logs to the company sawmill on the Southern Pacific Railroad at a place called Upton a few miles north of Mount Shasta. Originally, locomotives were borrowed from the Southern Pacific, but in 1902, the railroad received their first locomotive, number 1. By 1901 the company sawmill was moved to McCloud, and the distance for hauling lumber produced at McCloud was reduced to 17.8 miles (28.6 km) by shifting the junction south to Mount Shasta in 1906. The locomotives shifted from wood to oil fuel as the railroad extended into the forests east of McCloud in 1907. Trains brought logs to the McCloud sawmill from the east, and carried lumber from the sawmill west to the Southern Pacific.

In 1922, the Pacific Gas & Electric Company (PG&E) built branches south from the McCloud main line at Bartle to build hydropower plants on the Pit River. Materials to build the Pit 1 powerhouse, the Pit 3 Dam, and the Pit 4 Dam were carried over the McCloud River Railroad to connection with the Pit River Railroad officially known as the Mount Shasta Corporation Construction Railroad. During this period, the McCloud Lumber Company, who owned the railroad, decided to build a branch north-east to access the forests there. Meanwhile, the Great Northern and Western Pacific Railroads were building a north–south mainline, with plans to meet at Lookout. The McCloud decided to continue their lumber branch to serve as an interchange with the Great Northern and Western Pacific. The connection was made at Lookout Junction in 1927, although the connection of the GN and WP was actually made 6 miles south in Bieber. However, when the Great Depression hit, McCloud was desperate for money. So, they decided to sell the line from Lookout to Hambone to the GN. The McCloud retained operating rights until the Branch was abandoned in 2003. In 1955, McCloud extended the former PG&E line south to Burney. Upon reaching Burney, McCloud operated a 130-mile (210 km) railroad including trackage rights over the 34-mile (55 km) Great Northern Hambone branch.

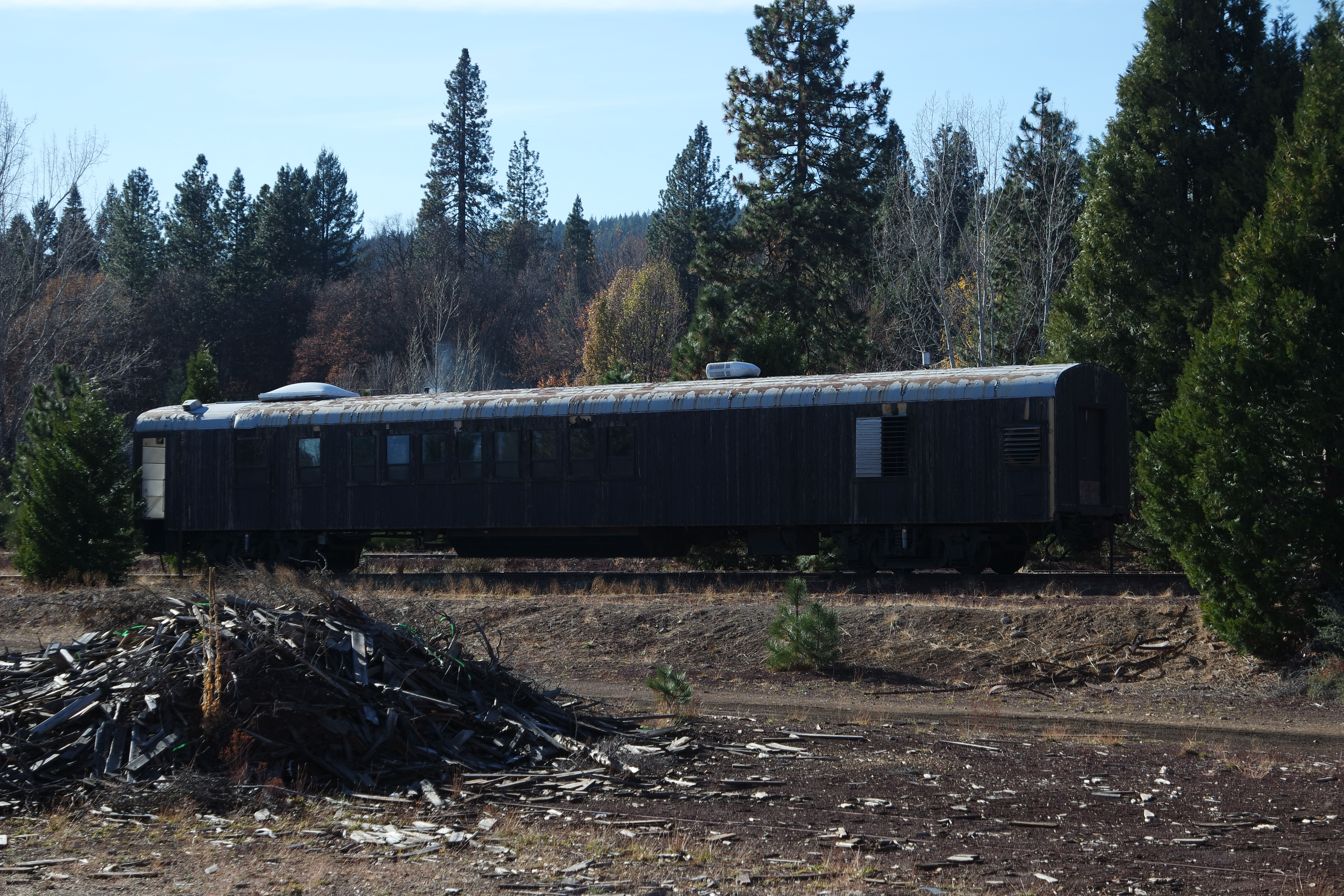
An abandon McCloud Railway passenger car left in storage, on November 26, 2020

The railroad remained primarily a logging railroad with several different owners over the following years including: U.S. Plywood Corporation (1963), U.S. Plywood-Champion Papers (1969), Champion International (1972) and Itel Corporation (1977), until the railroad officially ceased logging operations in 1979. The railroad was sold to Jeff E. and Verline Forbis (4-Rails, Inc.) on July 1, 1992. On June 28, 2005, the railroad petitioned the Surface Transportation Board to abandon most of its line. Service on all line east of the McCloud Sawmill (now abandoned) has been terminated. A small section of line between McCloud and Mount Shasta remained open briefly for excursion and dinner train service. As timber demand declined, the railroad slowly cut back although new ownership also led to its downfall. In 2009, the railroad was sold to the MidWest Pacific Rail Net & Logistics, owner of A&K Railroad Materials, among other things. Railroad operations slowed down in 2005, with the abandonment of the Burney Branch, but continued on. The Shasta Sunset Dinner Train was the only scheduled train on the entire line, with the occasional yard and hill job. In 2009, it was announced by the railroad that the dinner train will cease operations by the end of the year, the final dinner train operated on Saturday, January 16, 2010, ending all operations on McCloud.

In August 2026, a new plan to re-open the railroad for train excursions and rail bike use was announced. A volunteer work session was held from September 25 to 27 later that year, clearing and fixing trackage and remaining equipment on site to return the railroad to operation. The railroad predicts a return of diesel powered excursions in 2027.

== Rolling stock ==
Lima Locomotive Works built two Shay locomotives for McCloud River Railroad in February 1912. Builders numbers 2401 and 2402 wore McCloud River numbers 16 and 17 until sold in 1924 to Fruit Growers Supply Company of Susanville, California, as numbers 4 and 5.

During the latter days of steam, summer trains often included a fire car behind the engine. The fire car was a tank car filled with water topped by an automobile engine-powered pump.

Starting in 1948, the railroad began to order Baldwin diesels, mustering 8 diesels in 1964. The road used Baldwin's DRS-6-6-1500/AS-616 series due to their impressive tractive effort; far more than any comparable ALCo or EMD offering at the time. In the later 1950s, with the opening of the Burney branch, the road bought two RS12 units, one S12, and one S8.

In the 1960s, the Baldwins were almost twenty years old, and were showing their age. The road bought three secondhand units from Southern Pacific; an AS-616 and two DRS-6-6-1500s. Unit #28 was damaged in the early 1960s in a wreck, and the unit was shoved behind the shops and cannibalized for parts. The AS-616 and one DRS-6-6-1500 were painted for the road; the second DRS-6-6-1500 was cannibalized for parts without use. All Baldwins were sold in 1969 to various scrap companies and shortlines, upon the arrival of new power.

To relieve the aging Baldwin diesels, the railroad bought three EMD SD38 locomotives numbered 36–38 in April 1969 (Builder No. 34880-34882). The units were used for all duties along the line, and as traffic increased on the road, the railroad ordered a single SD38-2, built August 1974 (Builder No. 74623-1). When the property was put up for sale in 1998, Union Pacific (with their SD38-2 yard fleet) showed interest. UP bought the single SD38-2, leaving the other three SD38s. The SD38s soldiered on under new ownership. The first unit ordered, 36, encountered problems and was cannibalized for parts to keep the other two SD38s running in 2005 (exactly like the Baldwin #28). All three were later sold to the Dakota Southern Railroad for use on their line.

The railroad, starting in 1995, also had two ex-McCloud River Railway steam locomotives, nos. 18 and 25. No. 18 was sold to the Virginia & Truckee Railroad in 2005.

No. 25, the steam engine which appeared in Stand By Me and also Bound for Glory, was out of service from 2001 until September 2007, when it was rebuilt for another movie deal, but that one fell through. The No. 25 was then stored in McCloud in operable condition. Both No 18 & 25 are oil burning locomotives. No. 18 made her first revenue run on the V&T on July 24, 2010. No. 25 was sold to the Oregon Coast Scenic Railroad in March 2011 for their excursion operations out of Garibaldi, Oregon.

In 1994, McCloud Railway leased an ex-McCloud steam engine (Yreka Western #19) and had it painted as McCloud River Railroad 19. The unit was used to see if there was enough of an interest in a tourist train on the line, and was tested in April 1994. The test was a massive success; excursions would commence in the next two years. The unit was sold to the Age of Steam Roundhouse in 2016, where it is currently undergoing its 1,472-day inspection and overhaul to return to operating condition.

MCR once owned 1,182 freight cars (1996 estimate). Most of these have been sold since the abandonment of freight service.

=== Motive power ===
Locomotive details
Number	Image	Type	Built	Builder	Works number	Notes
1		2-6-0	1891	Baldwin Locomotive Works	11627	Built for California Railway; purchased 1897; later renumbered as McCloud #12.
2		3-truck Heisler locomotive	1897	Stearns Manufacturing Company		Purchased new.
3		3-truck Heisler locomotive	1897	Stearns Manufacturing Company		Purchased new.
4		2-6-2	1898	Baldwin Locomotive Works	16239	Purchased new; scrapped 1939.
5		0-6-0T	1900	Baldwin Locomotive Works	17684	Vauclain compound formerly permanently coupled with #6; sold to Lystul-Lawson Logging Company after separation.
6		0-6-0T	1900	Baldwin Locomotive Works	17685	Built as a double-ended permanently coupled 0-6-0+0-6-0 Vauclain compounds; sold to Atkinson Construction Company after separation.
7		4-6-0	1886	Baldwin Locomotive Works	7935	Built for St. Louis–San Francisco Railway; purchased 1900; sold to Hetch Hetchy Railroad in 1917.
8		2-6-2	1901	Baldwin Locomotive Works	18595	Purchased new; sold to Amador Central Railroad.
9		2-6-2	Baldwin Locomotive Works	1901	18596	Purchased new; sold to Yreka Western Railroad. On display at the Age of Steam Roundhouse.
10		2-6-2	1901	Baldwin Locomotive Works	18674	Purchased new; sold to Yreka Western Railroad.
11		2-6-2	1904	Baldwin Locomotive Works	23875	Vauclain compound purchased new; scrapped 1939.
12		2-6-0	1891	Baldwin Locomotive Works		formerly #1; scrapped 1932.
14		2-8-2	1907	Baldwin Locomotive Works	30850	Purchased new; scrapped.
15		2-8-2	1907	Baldwin Locomotive Works	30851	Purchased new; scrapped.
16 (1st)		3-truck Shay locomotive	1911	Lima Locomotive Works	2401	Purchased new; sold to Fruit Growers Supply in 1924.
16 (2nd)		2-8-2	1913	Baldwin Locomotive Works	39394	Purchased from Silver Falls Timber Company.
17 (1st)		3-truck Shay locomotive	1911	Lima Locomotive Works	2402	Purchased new; sold to Fruit Growers Supply in 1924.
17 (2nd)		2-8-2	1916	Baldwin Locomotive Works	42912	Purchased from Pacific Portland Cement Company in 1942.
18		2-8-2	1914	Baldwin Locomotive Works	41709	Purchased new; sold to Virginia & Truckee Railroad in 2005.
19		2-8-2	1915	Baldwin Locomotive Works	42000	Built for Caddo River Lumber Co. of Rosboro, AR as their No.4, then sold to Cia de Real del Monte y Pachuca as their No.105 around 1920; sold to McCloud River around 1924; sold to Yreka Western Railroad 1953; in 2016, purchased by and returned to service in March 2026.
20		2-6-2	1924	Baldwin Locomotive Works	57617	Purchased new.
21		2-6-2	1924	Baldwin Locomotive Works	57618	Purchased new.
22		2-6-2	1925	American Locomotive Company (Schenectady)	66316	Purchased new.
23		2-6-2	1925	American Locomotive Company (Schenectady)	66317	Purchased new; sold to Arcata and Mad River Railroad #11 in 1953.
24		2-6-2	1925	American Locomotive Company (Schenectady)	66434	Purchased new.
25		2-6-2	1925	American Locomotive Company (Schenectady)	66435	Purchased new; sold to Oregon Coast Scenic Railroad in March 2011.
26		2-8-2	1915	American Locomotive Company (Brooks)	55492	Purchased from Copper River and Northwestern Railway in 1938.
27		2-8-2	1917	American Locomotive Company (Brooks)	57291	Purchased from Copper River and Northwestern Railway in 1938.
28		DRS-6-6-1500	1948	Baldwin Locomotive Works	73653	Purchased new, damaged, became parts unit
29		DRS-6-6-1500	1950	Baldwin Locomotive Works	74812	Purchased new; sold to Magma Arizona Railroad.
30		S-12	1953	Baldwin-Lima-Hamilton	75912	Purchased new. Sold to Rayonier Inc at Sekiu Washington operation in 1963. Sold to US Steel at Pittsburg, California in June 1974. Resold to Feather River Rail Society of Portola, California in November 1992. Repurchased by McCloud in 1995.
31		S-8	1953	Baldwin-Lima-Hamilton	75913	Purchased new, built as an S-12 without a turbocharger with intent of conversion to S-12 at a later date.
32		RS-12	1955	Baldwin-Lima-Hamilton	76024	Purchased new; sold to California Western Railroad, scrapped 1995.
33		RS-12	1955	Baldwin-Lima-Hamilton	76105	Purchased new; sold to California Western Railroad; preserved at Travel Town Museum.
34		AS-616	1952	Baldwin-Lima-Hamilton	75449	Built as Southern Pacific #5253; purchased 1963; sold to Oregon and Northwestern Railroad in 1969.
35		DRS-6-6-1500	1949	Baldwin Locomotive Works	74261	Built as Southern Pacific #5207; purchased 1964; sold to US Steel in 1969
36 (1st)		DRS-6-6-1500	1949	Baldwin Locomotive Works	74258	Built as Southern Pacific #5204; purchased 1964; bought for parts, #36 was put into its numberboards but the unit was very rarely used.
36 (2nd)		SD38	1969	Electro-Motive Diesel	34880	Purchased new, cannibalized for parts after electrical problems in 2005.
37		SD38	1969	Electro-Motive Diesel	34881	Purchased new, sold to Dakota Southern Railway in 2017.
38		SD38	1969	Electro-Motive Diesel	34882	Purchased new.
39		SD38-2	1974	Electro-Motive Diesel	74623-1	Purchased new; sold to Union Pacific, renumbered UP 2824, renumbered as UPY 824.
52		Motorcar	1923	Caterpillar Inc.		Home built in Pondosa in 1923. Used to transport loggers to and from the woods; called the Red Goose.
