= Baldwin DRS-6-6-1500 =

DRS-6-6-1500
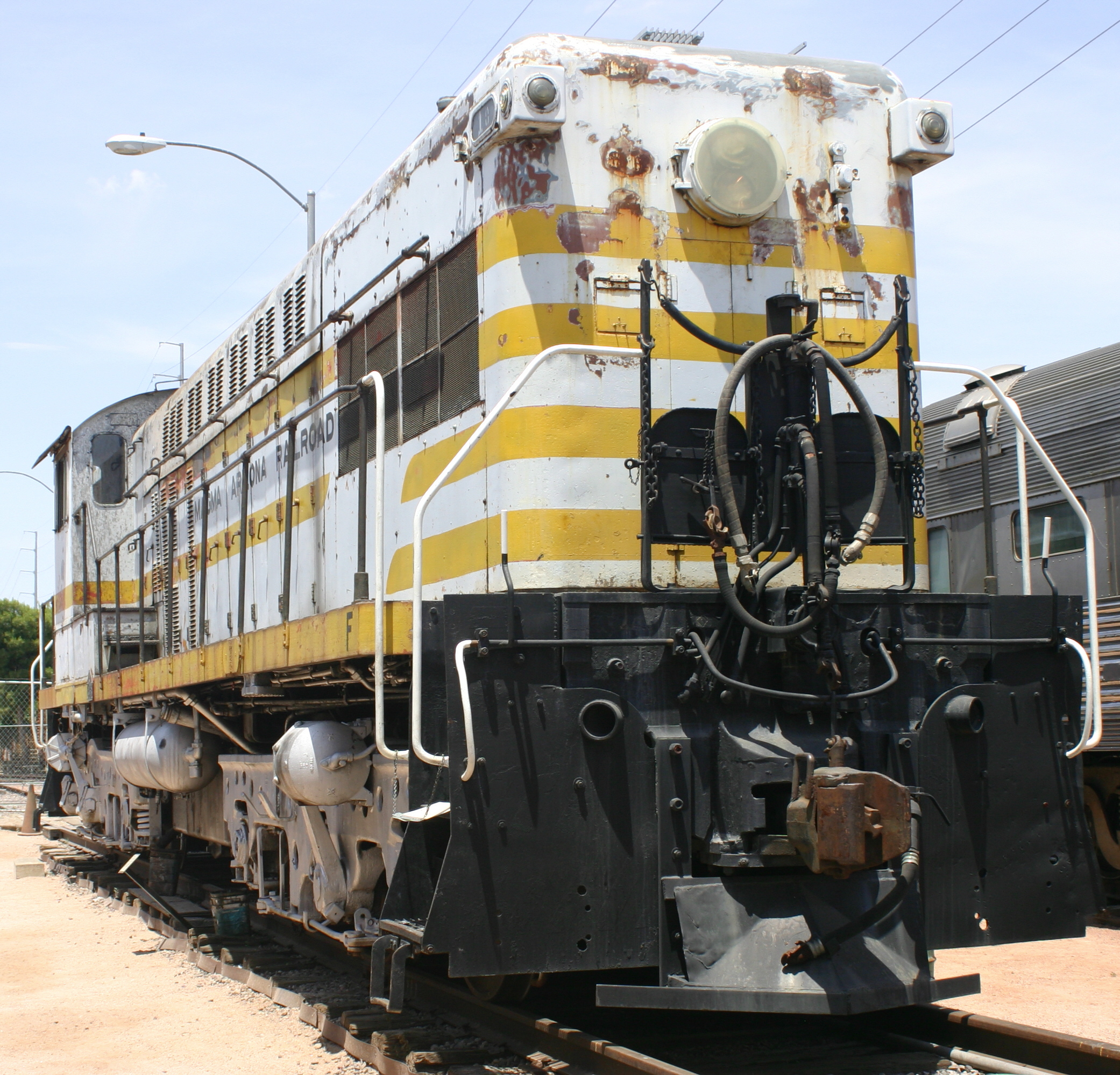
- Magma Arizona Railroad #10 (ne McCloud River Railroad #29) at the Arizona Railway Museum
Type and origin
- Power type: Diesel electric
- Builder: Baldwin Locomotive Works
- Model: DRS-6-6-1500
- Build date: February 1948–July 1950
- Total produced: 83
Specifications
- Configuration
  - AAR: C-C
- Gauge: 4 ft 8 1/2 in (1,435 mm) standard gauge
- Prime mover: 608SC
- RPM range: 625 (max)
- Aspiration: Turbocharged
- Cylinders: 8
- Cylinder size: 12.75 in × 15.5 in (324 mm × 394 mm)
Performance figures
- Power output: 1,500 hp (1.12 MW)
Career
- Disposition: 2 preserved, remainder scrapped

The Baldwin DRS-6-6-1500 was a diesel-electric locomotive rated at 1,500 horsepower (1,100 kW), that rode on a pair of three-axle trucks, having a C-C wheel arrangement.

== Original buyers ==
Image	Railroad	ttc Quantity	Road numbers	Notes
	Bessemer and Lake Erie Railroad	5	403–407	
	Chesapeake and Ohio Railway	3	5530–5532	
	Chicago and North Western Railway	8	1500–1502, 1505–1509	
	Duluth, South Shore and Atlantic Railway	4	200–203	to Soo Line Railroad 384–387
	Eagle Mountain Railroad	2	1010A, 1010B	Owned by the Kaiser Steel Corporation
	Elgin, Joliet and Eastern Railway	2	500–501	ex Bessemer and Lake Erie 401–402
	Erie Railroad	12	1150–1161	
	McCloud River Railroad	2	28, 29	
	Minneapolis, Northfield and Southern Railway	1	15	
	Northern Pacific Railway	1	177	Renumbered 525 to Burlington Northern 407
	Southern Pacific Company	24	5203–5226	
	Southern Pacific Company	1	5227	B unit
	Southern Pacific Company (Texas & New Orleans)	4	187–190	
	Tennessee Coal, Iron and Railroad	2	1500, 1501	
	Union Railroad	12	613–624	
	McCloud Railway	2	28-29	Sold to Magma Arizona Railroad
	Total	85		

== Preservation ==
• McCloud River Railway #29 is preserved as Magma Arizona #10 at the Arizona Railway Museum in Chandler, Arizona.

• Southern Pacific #5208 is preserved at the California State Railroad Museum in Sacramento, California.
