= Columbia River Belt Line 7 =

Steam locomotive in California

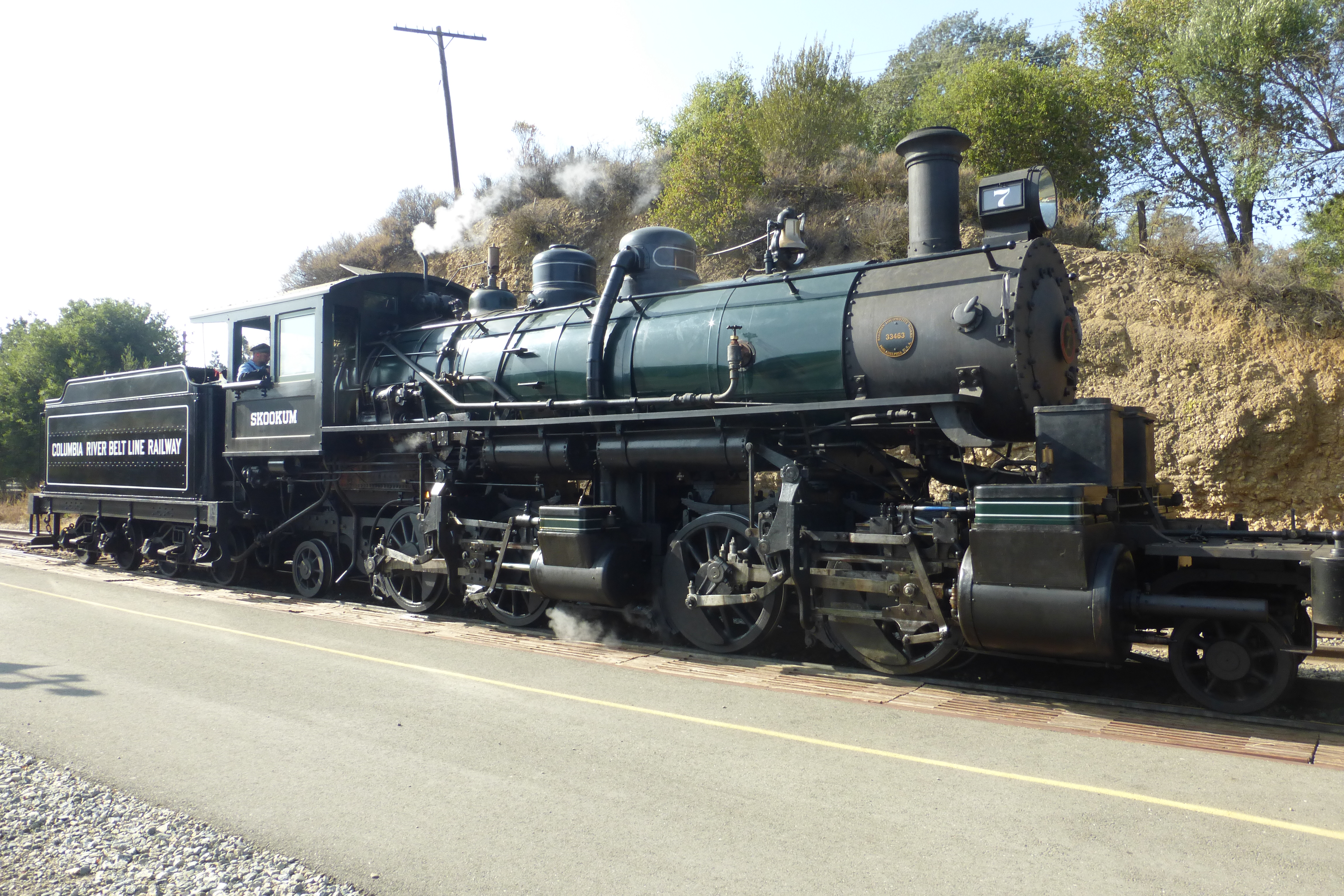
- No. 7 on the Niles Canyon Railway in September 2020
Type and origin
- Power type: Steam
- Builder: Baldwin Locomotive Works
- Serial number: 33463
- Build date: June 1909
Specifications
- Configuration
  - Whyte: 2-4-4-2
- Driver dia.: 48 in (1.219 m)
- Wheelbase: 55.17 ft (16.82 m)
  - Engine: 33 ft (10 m)
  - Drivers: 10.67 ft (3.25 m)
- Adhesive weight: 129,850 lb (58,900 kg)
- Loco weight: 162,650 lb (73,780 kg)
- Tender weight: 80,350 lb (36,450 kg)
- Total weight: 243,000 lb (110,000 kg)
- Fuel type: New: Coal; Now: Oil
- Fuel capacity: 1,500 US gal (5,700 L; 1,200 imp gal)
- Water cap.: 4,000 US gal (15,000 L; 3,300 imp gal)
- Firebox
  - Grate area: 28.30 sq ft (2.629 m^{2})
- Boiler pressure: 200 psi (1,400 kPa)
- Cylinders: Four, outside
- High-pressure cylinder: 15 in × 22 in (380 mm × 560 mm)
- Low-pressure cylinder: 23 in × 22 in (580 mm × 560 mm)
- Valve gear: Walschaerts
- Valve type: Piston valves
- Loco brake: Air
- Train brakes: Air
- Couplers: Knuckle
Performance figures
- Tractive effort: 24,600 lbf (109.43 kN)
- Factor of adh.: 5.28
Career
- Operators: Little River Railroad; Whitney Logging Company; Columbia River Belt Line Railway; Carlisle-Pennell Lumber Company; Mud Bay Logging Company (leased); Oregon Coast Scenic Railroad; Niles Canyon Railway (leased)
- Numbers: LRLC 126; CRLC Skookum; Carlisle-Pennell 7; DRLCo 7
- Official name: Skookum
- Retired: February 1955
- Restored: December 2018
- Current owner: Chris Baldo
- Disposition: Operational

Columbia River Belt Line 7, also known as Skookum, is a preserved 2-4-4-2 "Mallet" type steam locomotive, built in June 1909 by the Baldwin Locomotive Works (BLW). It was used to pull logging trains in the Pacific Northwest, until 1955, when the locomotive fell on its side, and it was abandoned. Several decades and ownership changes later, No. 7 was restored to operating condition in 2018. Presently, Skookum is owned by Chris Baldo, and has been moved to the California State Railroad Museum.

== History ==
=== Development and design ===
In 1909, the Baldwin Locomotive Works of Philadelphia, Pennsylvania, received an order by Tennessee's Little River Railroad (LRLC) to construct a Mallet locomotive. The Little River Railroad's president, Colonel W. B. Townsend, wanted his company to experiment with a locomotive that would be light enough to negotiate light-weight rails and tight curves while being powerful enough to pull longer trains than an average steam engine of the time. Baldwin subsequently came out with the first Mallet they would ever build for a logging company; No. 7 was built in June 1909, originally carrying the number 126 and without a name. It was a one-off design, having carried the unusual 2-4-4-2 wheel configuration, and it was capable of negotiating a 160-ft-radius curve. It was originally ordered and built as a coal burner, but was converted to burn oil very shortly before delivery.

=== Revenue service ===
After No. 126 was delivered, the Little River Railroad used it for some trial runs on their trackage. In the process, the locomotive derailed on curves multiple times, and it was discovered that No. 126 was too heavy for the light-weight rails. Unsatisfied with its weight, the railroad sent the engine back to Baldwin less than one month after its delivery. Baldwin subsequently built a smaller 2-4-4-2, No. 148, for the Little River Railroad's needs, and they offered No. 126 for sale to other companies. After sitting in Baldwin's factory yard for a short while, No. 126 was purchased in June 1910 by the Whitney Logging Company of Blind Slough, Oregon. That same year, it was converted from coal firing to oil firing. The locomotive was soon delivered to Blind Slough, where the company, whose practice was to give their engines names instead of numbers, removed the number 126 and added the name "Skookum" (where "skookum" is a Chinook term meaning "strong, powerful, reliable").

The Whitney Logging Company assigned Skookum to work for its rail subsidiary, the Columbia River Belt Line Railway. Skookum quickly exceeded all expectations over its performance, as it successfully pulled trains without any problems. One factor to this might have been the CRBL's trackage having more support for the engine, compared to Little River's trackage. During 1911, Skookum's success was covered in several local newspapers. The positive press led to Baldwin receiving additional orders for nearly 50 other Mallet engines for other logging companies in the coming years. Skookum continued in service the CRBL until 1920, when it was sold to the Larkin-Green Lumber Company, who was also in Blind Slough.

They quickly sold the engine to the Carlisle-Pennell Lumber Company of Onalaska, Washington, who removed the name "Skookum" and added the number 7, before it was placed into service there. During its time there, the locomotive was rebuilt with additional handrails on the pilot deck, and the air pump was relocated to the front of the smokebox door. Beginning in 1924, No. 7 was transferred to Carlisle-Pennell's subsidiary, the Newaukum Valley Railroad. From 1930 to 1931, at the start of the Great Depression, No. 7 was leased to the Mud Bay Logging Company to pull lumber trains between Mud Bay and Olympia. After the lease, the engine was moved back to Carlisle-Pennell's property, but by 1933, the company had cleared out all of their timber lands. With No. 7 no longer needed in Onalaska, it was sold again to the Deep River Logging Company of Deep River, Washington.

DRLCo undid the modifications Carlisle-Pannell made to No. 7, and the locomotive was used to pull their heavier lumber trains. It was commonly selected as the company's primary choice of motive power, due to its greater power and traction, compared to the rest of DRLCo's roster. Later, in the early 1950s, DRLCo began to consider discontinuing their rail operations, due to their decrease in traffic, and they subsequently decided to have all of their remaining locomotives scrapped and their remaining rails removed by the end of 1955. On the afternoon of February 23, 1955, No. 7 was moving in reverse with a string of empty freight cars to pick up a heavy load. However, when it reached a small trestle near Grays Harbor, its tender hit a broken piece of rail, making it derail and hang halfway on the trestle, and the entire engine precariously leaned towards one side. The crews dropped the fire, came off and examined the situation, and they felt the Mallet seemed stable enough to remain still, so they left it and waited until the next morning to re-rail it, using the company's ALCO 2-6-2 engine.

"[It was] as if an elephant had simply rolled over on its side to go to sleep."

— Unnamed crew member at the time of No. 7's fall

The fireman also chose to keep the crown sheet covered with water overnight, so the engine would be ready for service the next day, but as water was injected into the boiler, it affected the center of gravity for No. 7. When crews came back for No. 7, the center of gravity gave out, and the locomotive completely toppled onto its side off of the short trestle. Despite the locomotive receiving minimal damage from hitting the soft ground and a muddy creek bed, the crews saw no easy way to move it upright onto the rails. With DRLCo only having a few months left of operating time, and with the ALCO 2-6-2 still operable, it was decided to simply abandon No. 7 right where it sat. When scrapping commenced on the company's remaining fleet, the scrappers opted not to torch No. 7, because it was too inconvenient to get the remains out of the remote area where the Mallet sat.

=== Long-term restoration ===
In 1956, rail fan Charlie Morrow became aware of No. 7's abandoned status in the woods. He had known about No. 7's fame for its innovative design for years, and he decided to contact the scrappers with the possibility of buying it. He successfully managed to purchase the Mallet for its scrap value of $1,200. Morrow subsequently co-founded a group alongside other rail fans, called the Puget Sound Railway Historical Association, in dedication of bringing No. 7 back under steam. In the summer of 1960, the process of moving the locomotive out of the woods began, but since the rails had been ripped up years prior, and with roadways not being located close by, Morrow and his fellow PSRHA members had to disassemble No. 7 and move it in sections. No. 7's boiler and frame had been attached to each other since the 1909 construction date, and the PSRHA members struggled to have them separated with the rusty bolts locking them together. As a last resort, they decided to blast them apart, using dynamite, and the boiler and frame were finally separated.

Soon, the boiler, frame and tender were separately shipped to PARHA's location in Snoqualmie, Washington, where restoration work to get No. 7 running again was expected to quickly begin. For reasons unknown, the PARHA's plans to restore and run No. 7 had fallen through, and the Mallet instead sat, disassembled in PARHA's Niblock Yard for the next few decades with little activity done on it. In 1978, Morrow died, and No. 7 fell under ownership of an estate company, who in turn sold it to a California-based logger, Rohan Coombs. Coombs kept No. 7 in Snoqualmie, while he explored options for the Mallet's future. In 1996, Coombs had the pieces relocated to the Mount Rainier Scenic Railroad in Mineral, Washington. The plan was to have the locomotive restored and eventually ran on Mount Rainier's trackage, but this also fell through.

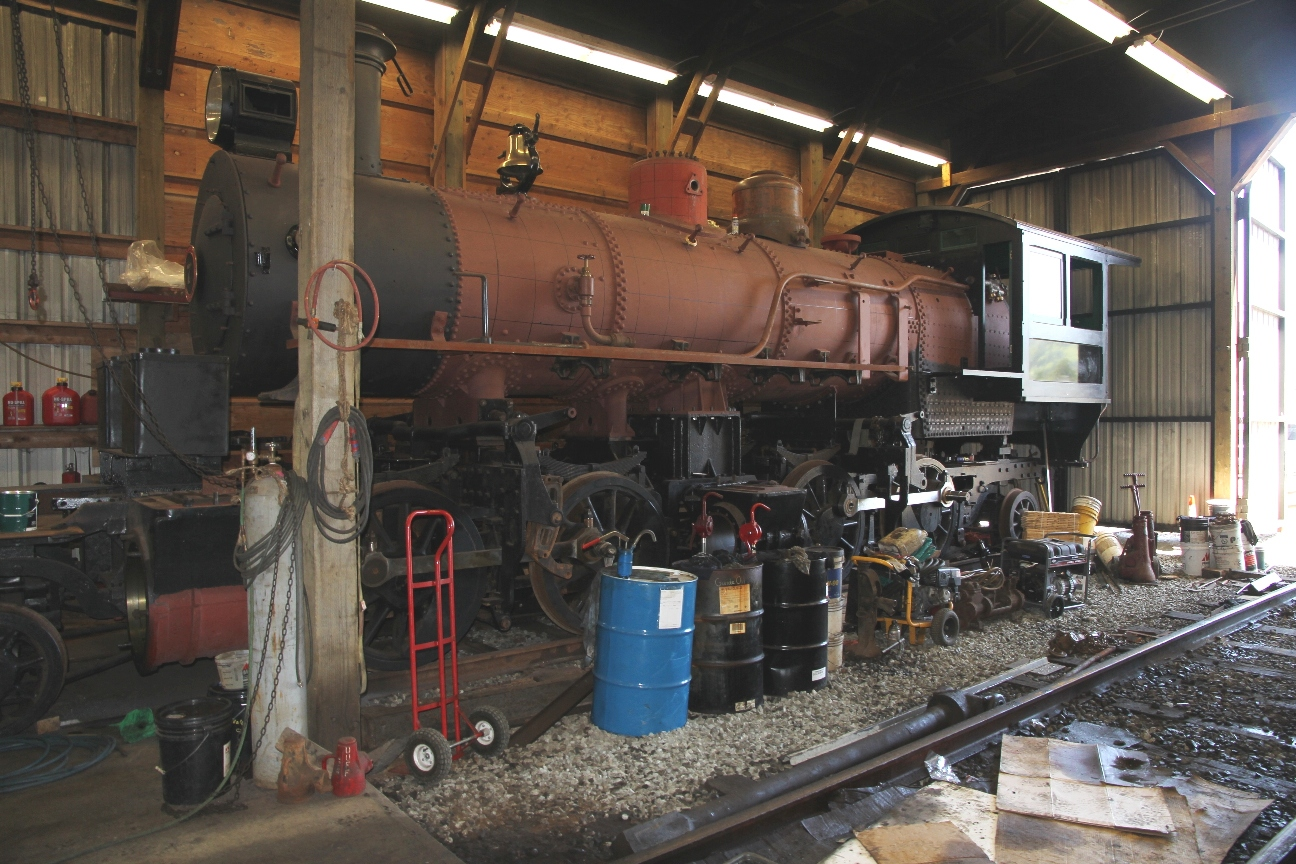
Skookum undergoing restoration inside the OCSR's Garibaldi engine shed in June 2015

In 2004, Coombs began experiencing failing health, and he contacted another rail fan, Chris Baldo, about purchasing the engine before his death. Baldo agreed to purchase No. 7, and with the help of a young rail apprentice, Scott Wickert, No. 7's frame and running gear were moved to the recently established Oregon Coast Scenic Railroad (OSCR) in Garibaldi, Oregon for repairs. The boiler and tender were moved to Chehalis, Washington to undergo an extensive rebuilding process. Baldo also had an exact replica of No. 7's original wooden cab made from scratch. During the restoration, it was decided to revert the engine to its CRBL livery with its "Skookum" name, but also having it retain its road-number 7. Years later, on December 15, 2014, the rebuilt boiler was moved to Garibaldi by truck, and the next day, it was lifted and reunited with the frame. The tender was also moved to an Oregon Coast engine house in Tillamook for temporary storage.

In January 2018, McCloud Railway locomotive 25 towed Skookum's tender from Tillamook to Garibaldi, and the following day, the tender was reunited with No. 7. In October 2018, No. 7 was test fired and was steamed up for the first time in nearly 69 years, and on behalf of Pete Lerro, it took part in a public photo charter alongside McCloud Railway 25 and Polson Logging Co. 2. During the charter, however, Skookum was experiencing some timing issues with the engineer side low pressure steam chest, and this prevented the Mallet from traveling any further from the Garibaldi engine shed. Once the Pete Lerro charter ended, No. 7 was moved back inside the engine shed, and crews began examining the engine's running gear. The discovered timing issue originated in the high pressure eccentric valves. This was fixed with new keys being made and installed for the eccentric valves. In December, Skookum was steamed up again for a test run, and it ran under its own power without incident.

=== Excursion service ===
"Pretty much everyone thought that this project was impossible, but its the kind of project that takes the skills of a massive amount of people, and I'm happy to see most of those faces here tonight."

— Chris Baldo

On March 2, 2019, Skookum made its official first public run, and several years restoration work on the engine was finally completed. Some days later, the engine participated in two public photo charters that were sponsored by Trains Magazine, and McCloud 25 and Polson Logging 2 also took part. In April No. 7 steamed to Tillamook, its last operation on Oregon soil; the engine and tender were subsequently loaded into separate heavy-haul trucks and transported south to the Niles Canyon Railway (NICX). After arriving in the NCRY's location in Sunol, California, No. 7 spent the entirety of the 2019 summer months pulling excursion trains on NCRY's trackage alongside their own locomotives. In March 2020, at the onset of the COVID-19 pandemic, the NCRY closed to the public and No. 7 was left in storage. In September 2020, the NCRY reopened to the public, with Skookum pulling several other excursions in the ensuing months, including a May 1, 2021 run to benefit the restoration of Southern Pacific 1744. In October 2019, No. 7 operated alongside Clover Valley Lumber Company No. 4 in celebration of the 150th Anniversary of the completion of the Transcontinental Railroad.

In May 2026, No. 7 was moved from the Niles Canyon Railway to the California State Railroad Museum in Sacramento, CA. There, it is expected that it will pull passenger trains on the Sacramento Southern Railroad for the next 5 years.

== See also ==
- East Tennessee and Western North Carolina 12
- Flagg Coal Company 75
- Lake Superior and Ishpeming 33
- McCloud Railway 19
- Mount Emily Lumber Co. 1
- Southern Pine Lumber Co. 28
