= Oil burner (engine) =

Steam engine that uses oil as fuel

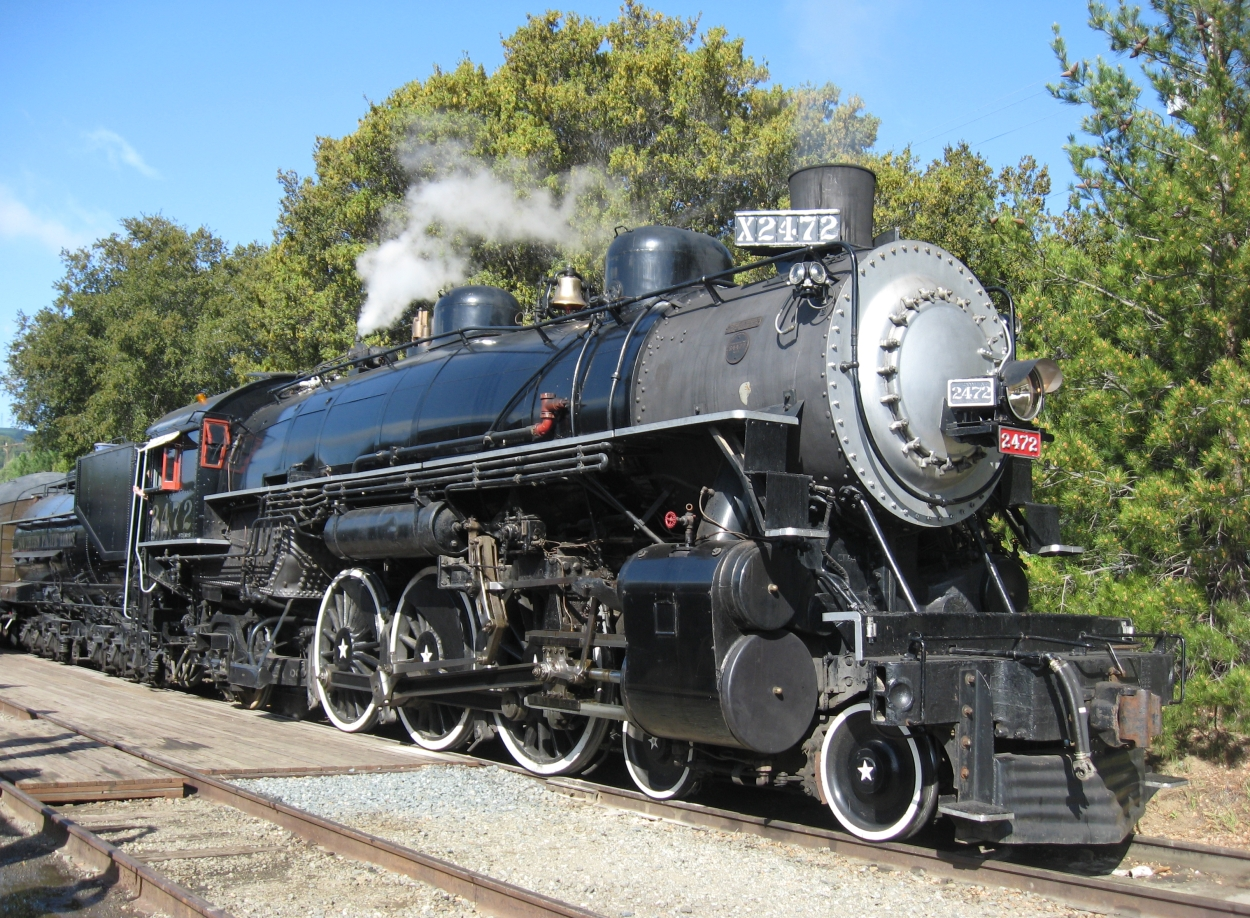
Oil Burning Locomotive: Southern Pacific 2472 at the Niles Canyon Railway

An oil burner engine is a steam engine that uses oil as its fuel. The term is usually applied to a locomotive or ship engine that burns oil to heat water, to produce the steam which drives the pistons, or turbines, from which the power is derived.

This is mechanically very different from diesel engines, which use internal combustion, although they are sometimes colloquially referred to as oil burners.

Oil-burning steam engines first appeared in the latter half of the 19th century, but their use remained largely confined to regions such as the Caspian and southern Russia, where oil was abundant and coal scarce. Oil burning steam engines were used more extensively in ships and trains during the first half of the 20th century, before the widespread adoption of diesel engines rendered the technology largely obsolete.

In the 21st century, oil‑fired steam locomotives have become popular with heritage railway operators due to inherent advantages relative to coal, including reduced wildfire risk, lower maintenance requirements, and improved emissions performance.

== History ==
A variety of experimental oil powered steam boilers were patented in the 1860s. Most of the early patents used steam to spray atomized oil into the steam boilers furnace. Attempts to burn oil from a free surface were unsuccessful due to the inherently low rates of combustion from the available surface area.

On 21 April 1868, the steam yacht Henrietta made a voyage down the river Clyde powered by an oil fired boiler designed and patented by a Mr Donald of George Miller & Co. Donald's design used a jet of dry steam to spray oil into a furnace lined with fireproof bricks. Prior to the Henrietta’s oil burner conversion, George Miller & Co was recorded as having used oil to power their works in Glasgow for a “considerable time”.

During the late 19th century numerous burner designs were patented using combinations of steam, compressed air and injection pumps to spray oil into boiler furnaces. Most of the early oil burner designs were commercial failures due to the high cost of oil (relative to coal) rather than any technical issues with the burners themselves.

During the early 20th century, marine and large oil burning steam engines generally used electric motor or steam driven injection pumps. Oil would be drawn from a storage tank through suction strainers and across viscosity-reducing oil heaters. The oil would then be pumped through discharge strainers before entering the burners as a whirling mist. Combustion air was introduced through special furnace-fronts, which were fitted with dampers to regulate the supply. Smaller land-based oil burning steam engines typically used steam jets fed from the main boiler to blast atomized oil into the burner nozzles.

=== Steam ships ===
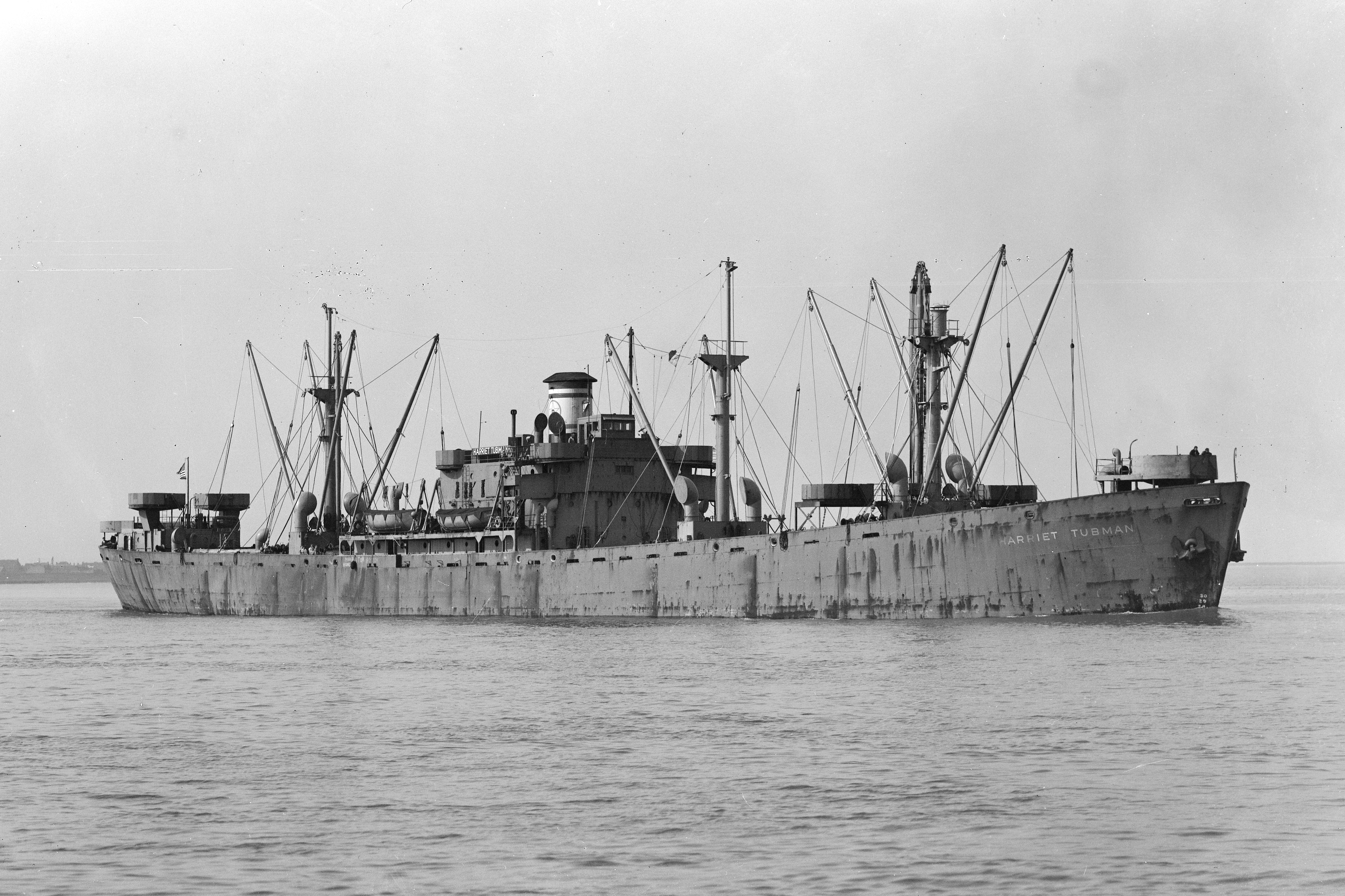
SS Harriet Tubman. Ships of the Liberty class were powered by two oil-fired boilers feeding a triple expansion steam engine.

In the 1870s, Caspian steamships began using mazut, a residual fuel oil which at that time was produced as a waste stream by the many oil refineries located in the Absheron peninsula. During the late 19th century Mazut remained cheap and plentiful in the Caspian region.

In 1870, either the SS Iran or SS Constantine (depending on source) became the first ship to convert to burning fuel oil, both were Caspian based merchant steamships.

During the 1870s, the Imperial Russian Navy converted the ships of the Caspian fleet to oil burners starting with the Khivenets in 1874.

In 1894, the oil tanker SS Baku Standard became the first oil burning vessel to cross the Atlantic Ocean. In 1903, the Red Star Liner SS Kensington became the first passenger liner to make the Atlantic crossing with boilers fired by fuel oil.

Fuel oil has a higher energy density than coal and oil powered ships did not need to employ stokers however coal remained the dominant power source for marine boilers throughout the 19th century primarily due to the relatively high cost of fuel oil. Oil was used in marine boilers to a greater extent during the early 20th century. By 1939, about half the world’s ships burned fuel oil, of these about half had steam engines and the other half used diesel engines.

=== Steam locomotives ===
Oil burners designed by Thomas Urquhart were fitted to the locomotives of the Gryazi-Tsaritsyn railway in southern Russia. Thomas Urquhart, who was employed as a Locomotive Superintendent by the Gryazi-Tsaritsyn Railway Company, began his experiments in 1874. By 1885 all the locomotives of the Gryazi-Tsaritsyn Railway had been converted to run on fuel oil.

In Great Britain, an early pioneer of oil burning railway locomotives was James Holden, of the Great Eastern Railway. In James Holden's system, steam was raised by burning coal before the oil fuel was turned on. Holden's first oil burning locomotive Petrolea, was a class T19 2-4-0. Built in 1893, Petrolea burned waste oil that the railway had previously been discharging into the River Lea. Due to the relatively low cost of coal, oil was rarely used on Britain's stream trains and in most cases only where there was a shortage of coal.

In the United States, the first oil burning steam locomotive was in service on the Southern Pacific railroad by 1900. By 1915 there were 4,259 oil burning steam locomotives in the United States, which represented 6.5% of all the locomotives then in service. Most oil burners were operated in areas west of the Mississippi where oil was abundant. American usage of oil burning steam locomotives peaked in 1945 when they were responsible for around 20% of all the fuel consumed (measured by energy content) during rail freight operations. After WW2, both oil and coal burning steam locomotives were replaced by more efficient diesel engines and had been almost entirely phased out of revenue service by 1960.

Many heritage railways prefer oil‑burning locomotives over coal‑fuelled ones, as these do not have the potential to cause trackside wildfires from cinders emitted from the locomotive’s smokestack. Some heritage railways have been forced to convert their engines to oil burning because the risk of wildfires was too high for continued operation with coal. Other factors favouring oil firing include reduced maintenance costs, lower particulate emissions and the scarcity of high‑quality anthracite coal as demand for this fuel declines. Converting to fuel oil also allows steam locomotives to use drop-in biofuels for reduced carbon dioxide emissions.

== Notable early oil-fired steamships ==
=== Passenger liners ===
- SS Kensington
- NMS Regele Carol I (one oil fired + one coal fired boiler)
- SS Tenyo Maru
- SS George Washington

=== Warships ===
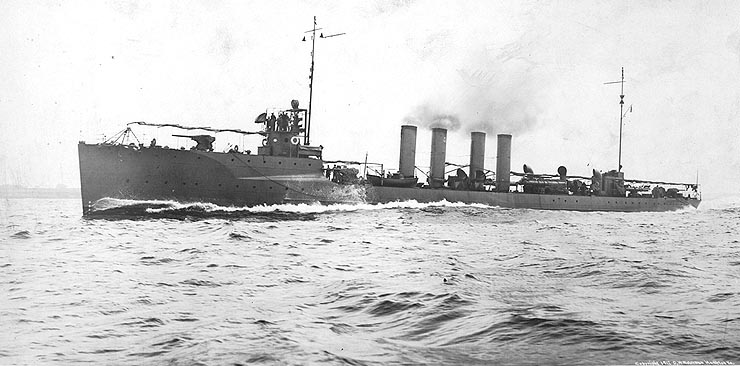
USS Trippe, an oil-fired steamship, one of the US Navy's Paulding class destroyers

- Re Umberto-class - Italian ironclad battleships equipped to burn a mix of coal and oil
- Rostislav - Russian battleship
- HMS Spiteful - British Royal Navy destroyer
- Paulding-class destroyers - US Navy

== Notable oil-fired steam locomotives ==
=== General ===
- Most cab forward locomotives
- Some Fairlie locomotives
- Some steam locomotives used on heritage railways
- Some advanced steam technology locomotives

=== Australia ===
- NSWGR D55 Class
- NSWGR D59 Class
- VR J Class
- VR R Class
- WAGR U Class
- WAGR Pr Class

=== India ===
- Darjeeling Himalayan Railway
- Nilgiri Mountain Railway

=== Great Britain ===
- GER Class T19
- GER Class P43
- WD Austerity 2-10-0 (3672 converted in preservation).
- GWR oil burning steam locomotives (4965 Rood Ashton Hall to be converted during overhaul in preservation).

=== New Zealand ===
- NZR JA class (North British-built locomotives only)
- NZR JB class
- NZR K class (1932) - converted from coal 1947-53
- NZR KA class - converted from coal 1947-53

=== North America ===
('*' symbol indicates locomotive was converted or is being converted from coal-burning to oil-burning in either revenue service or excursion service)

- Sierra Railway 3* - Part of Railtown 1897 State Historic Park (Jamestown, CA)
- Sierra Railway 28 - Part of Railtown 1897 State Historic Park (Jamestown, CA)
- McCloud Railway 25 - Oregon Coast Scenic Railroad (Garibaldi, OR)
- McCloud Railway 18 - Virginia and Truckee Railroad (Virginia City, NA)
- McCloud River Railroad 19* - Age of Steam Roundhouse (Sugarcreek, OH)
- Polson Logging Co. 2 - Albany and Eastern Railroad (Albany, OR)
- Sugar Pine Lumber Company 37 - Age of Steam Roundhouse (Sugarcreek, OH)
- California Western 45 - California Western Railroad (Fort Bragg, CA)
- US Army Transportation Corps 1702* - Great Smoky Mountains Railroad (Bryson City, NC)
- Southern Railway 722* - Great Smoky Mountains Railroad (Bryson City, NC)
- Union Pacific 844* - UP Heritage Fleet (Cheyenne, WY)
- Union Pacific 4014* - UP Heritage Fleet (Cheyenne, WY)
- Union Pacific 3985* - Railroading Heritage of Midwest America (Silvis, IL)
- Union Pacific 5511 - Railroading Heritage of Midwest America (Silvis, IL)
- Union Pacific 737* - Double-T Agricultural Museum (Stevinson, CA)
- White Pass and Yukon Route 73 - White Pass & Yukon Route (Skagway, AK)
- Alaska Railroad 557* - Engine 557 Restoration Company (Anchorage, AK)
- Santa Fe 5000* - Amarillo, TX
- Santa Fe 3759* - Locomotive Park (Kingman, AZ)
- Santa Fe 3751* - San Bernardino Railroad Historical Society (San Bernardino, CA)
- Santa Fe 3450* - RailGiants Train Museum (Pomona, CA)
- Santa Fe 3415* - Abilene and Smoky Valley Railroad (Abilene, KS)
- Spokane, Portland and Seattle 539* - Port of Kalama (Kalama, Washington)
- Santa Fe 2926 - New Mexico Steam Locomotive & Railroad Historical Society (Albuquerque, NM)
- Santa Fe 1316* - Texas State Railroad (Palestine, TX)
- Texas & Pacific 610 - Texas State Railroad (Palestine, TX)
- Southern Pine Lumber Co. 28 - Texas State Railroad (Palestine, TX)
- Tremont & Gulf 30/Magma Arizona 7 - Texas State Railroad (Palestine, TX)
- Lake Superior & Ishpeming 18* - Colebrookdale Railroad (Boyertown, PA)
- Canadian National 6060* - Alberta Prairie Railway (Stettler, Alberta)
- Florida East Coast 148 - US Sugar Corporation (Clewiston, FL)
- Grand Canyon Railway 29* - Grand Canyon Railway (Williams, AR)
- Grand Canyon Railway 4960* - Grand Canyon Railway (Williams, AR)
- Canadian National 1392* - Alberta Railway Museum (Edmonton, Alberta, Canada)
- Oregon Railroad and Navigation 197 - Oregon Rail Heritage Center (Portland, OR)
- Spokane, Portland & Seattle 700 - Oregon Rail Heritage Center (Portland, OR)
- Southern Pacific 4449 - Oregon Rail Heritage Center (Portland, OR)
- Southern Pacific 4460 - National Museum of Transportation (Kirkwood, MO)
- Southern Pacific 4294 - California State Railroad Museum (Sacramento, CA)
- Southern Pacific 2479 - Niles Canyon Railway (Sunol, CA)
- Southern Pacific 2472 - Golden Gate Railroad Museum
- Southern Pacific 2467 - Pacific Locomotive Association
- Southern Pacific 2353 - Pacific Southwest Railway Museum (Campo, CA)
- Southern Pacific 1744 - Niles Canyon Railway (Sunol, CA)
- Southern Pacific 786 - Austin Steam Train Association, Inc. (Cedar Park, TX)
- Southern Pacific 745 - Louisiana Steam Train Association, Inc. (Jefferson, LA)
- Canadian National 2141* - Kamloops Heritage Railway (Kamloops, British Columbia)
- Southern Pacific 18 - Eastern California Museum (Independence, CA)
- Cotton Belt 819 - Arkansas Railroad Museum (Pine Bluff, AR)
- Frisco 1522 - National Museum of Transportation (Kirkwood, MO)
- White Pass and Yukon Route 70 - Dollywood Express (Pigeon Forge, Tennessee)
- White Pass and Yukon Route 192* - Dollywood Express (Pigeon Forge, Tennessee)
- Southern Railway 401* - Monticello Railway Museum (Monticello, IL)
- Reading 2100* - American Steam Railroad Preservation Association (Cleveland, OH)

== See also ==
- Oil refinery
- Steam power during the Industrial Revolution
- Timeline of steam power
