= Southern Pine Lumber Co. 28 =

Preserved 2-8-0 steam locomotive

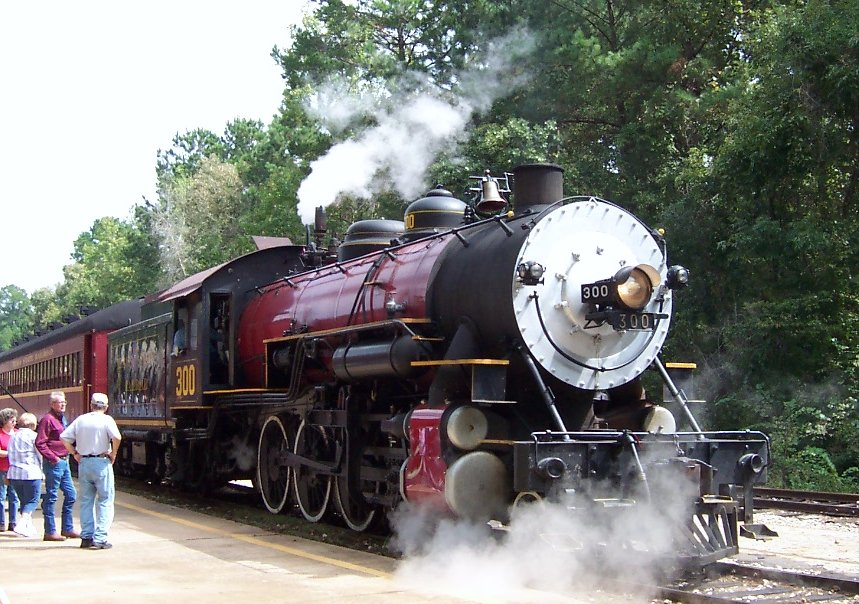
- No. 28 when it operated as TSRR No. 300, October 2, 2004
Type and origin
- Power type: Steam
- Builder: Baldwin Locomotive Works
- Serial number: 47032
- Model: 10-36E
- Build date: November 1917
Specifications
- Configuration
  - Whyte: 2-8-0
  - UIC: 1'D
- Driver dia.: 56 in (1,400 mm)
- Wheelbase: 57.41 ft (17.50 m)
  - Engine: 23.67 ft (7.21 m)
  - Drivers: 15.50 ft (4.72 m)
- Adhesive weight: 150,000 lb (68,000 kg)
- Loco weight: 166,400 lb (75,500 kg)
- Tender weight: 109,000 lb (49,000 kg)
- Total weight: 275,400 lb (124,900 kg)
- Fuel type: New: Coal; Now: Oil
- Fuel capacity: 9 t (8.9 long tons; 9.9 short tons) (Coal); 2,400 US gal (9,100 L; 2,000 imp gal) (Oil)
- Water cap.: 5,400 US gal (20,000 L; 4,500 imp gal)
- Firebox
  - Grate area: 32.70 sq ft (3.038 m^{2})
- Boiler pressure: 190 psi (1,300 kPa)
- Heating surface
  - Firebox: 181 sq ft (16.8 m^{2})
- Cylinders: Two, outside
- Cylinder size: 21 in × 28 in (530 mm × 710 mm)
- Valve gear: Walschaerts
- Valve type: Piston valves
- Loco brake: Air
- Train brakes: Air
- Couplers: Knuckle
Performance figures
- Tractive effort: 35,611 lbf (158,410 N)
- Factor of adh.: 4.21
Career
- Operators: United States Army Transportation Corps; Claiborne and Polk Railroad; Tremont and Gulf Railroad; Southern Pine Lumber Company; Texas State Railroad
- Class: Pershing
- Numbers: USATC 396; WRT 300; C&P 20; T&G 28; SPLCO 28; TSRR 300; AT&SF 2570
- Retired: 1962
- Restored: April 13, 1996
- Current owner: Texas State Railroad
- Disposition: Undergoing running gear repair

Southern Pine Lumber Company 28 is a preserved 2-8-0 "Consolidation" type steam locomotive that was originally operated by the United States Army Transportation Corps. It is one of three survivors out of over 1,500 General Pershing locomotives built in 1917 for the War Department in World War I, originally numbered No. 396. After the war, the locomotive was sold off to the Claiborne and Polk Railroad for short distance freight service, and from there, it was sold multiple times throughout its revenue career, until 1956, when it was sold to the Southern Pine Lumber Company in East Texas, where it operated until it was retired in the early 1970s. In 1972, the locomotive was donated to the Texas Parks and Wildlife Department, who moved it to the Texas State Railroad for restoration four years later. After over twenty years of being stored, awaiting for restoration to come to fruition, the locomotive was fired up again in April 1996 as TSRR No. 300. It has pulled multiple excursion trains between Rusk and Palestine every year since its return to steam alongside a few other steam locomotives, including 2-8-2 No. 400. As of 2026, the locomotive was reverted to one of its original identities as SPLCO No. 28.

== History ==
=== Revenue service ===
As World War I broke out, railroads across the United States faced a larger demand for larger and more powerful locomotives to ship military equipment coast to coast, and railways across Europe also needed powerful locomotives to carry their own troops and military vehicles. The United States Army Transportation Corps designed a new class of a 2-8-0 "Consolidation" type with a design model of 10-36E. It would be suitable to be shipped overseas, and this class was to be named Pershing, as named after General John J. Pershing. Approximately 1,500 locomotives of this class were built by the Baldwin Locomotive Works (BLW) of Philadelphia, Pennsylvania between 1916 and 1918 towards the end of the War. No. 28 was numbered 396 at the time and was one of the locomotives built in November 1917. Most of these 2-8-0s were shipped to France, which had a large shortage of locomotives at the time, and some of the Pershing locomotives were bombed there before the end of the war. No. 396 was among a few of the locomotives that stayed in the U.S., and it spent the rest of the war working in the Norfolk Naval Shipyard in Norfolk, Virginia.

In the mid-1920s, it was transferred to the Warrior River Terminal (WRT) short line in southern Alabama and was subsequently renumbered as WRT 300. It would remain there into the early 1930s, when it would be transferred again to assist in the construction of the Fort Peck Dam in Montana. In 1941, after completing its duties for the Army Corps of Engineers, it would be shipped to the Claiborne and Polk (C&P) Military Railroad in Louisiana and renumbered as C&P 20. It was never overhauled or put into service on the C&P until September–October, 1944. No. 20 spent its time there as one of the locomotives that were used for short-distance freight trains between Claiborne and Fort Polk. As World War II was winding down, No. 20's last movement on the C&P took place when it ran westbound from Camp Claiborne to Camp Polk on August 30, 1945, so that it could aid locomotive No. 11 with the switching at Camp Polk. Once the War was over, the C&P saw no further necessity in using steam locomotives, and No. 20 was sold to a private owner, who in turn sold the locomotive to the nearby Tremont and Gulf Railroad (T&G), who renumbered it to 28. No. 28 was subsequently used by the T&G to haul oil and lumber around the T&G system, particularly between Tremont, Winnfield, and West Monroe. As the 1950s began to progress, however, the T&G became one of many American railroads that decided to dieselize early on, and by 1954, all of their steam locomotives were withdrawn.

The following year, 1955, No. 28 was purchased by the Temple Lumber Company, which another year later, was merged into the Southern Pine Lumber Company (SPLCO), a shortline based in East Texas. After being overhauled in the Pineland shops, the company reassigned No. 28 to pull logging trains out of their Pineland mills and into local towns, and occasionally, it would be used for switching services. In the early 1960s, however, the SPLCO also discontinued steam operations, and No. 28 pulled its last revenue freight train in 1962 before being stored in Pineland. By the end of the 1960s, No. 28 became one of only three Pershing locomotives in the world that survived the scrapper's torch, and the only one left with a French-style cab. The other two being No. 101 at the National Railroad Museum in Green Bay, Wisconsin, and Romanian Railways No. 140 117 in Romania.

=== Texas State Railroad ===
No. 28 passing by with an excursion train when it was still liveried as Texas State Railroad 300, May 2007

In November 1972, the SPLCO donated the derelict locomotive to Texas Parks & Wildlife Department, who was redeveloping the Texas State Railroad (TSRR), a former shortline that lies between Palestine and Rusk, as a tourist attraction. When the TSRR opened for public excursion service in 1976, No. 28 was brought to the property for restoration work to begin. However, the locomotive was in poor condition by the time it arrived, and by the end of the 1970s, the TSRR had lost the right to restore their steam locomotives at Hahn and Clay in Houston, hence they constructed their own facility in Rusk. This delayed restoration work on No. 28 until the late 1980s. Multiple parts of the locomotive had to be replaced, due to their poor mechanical condition, including the boiler, most of the running gear, the cowcatcher, and the tender. Boilermen and welders took the time to get the restoration process finished. During this process, the locomotive was renumbered 300, since the TSRR decided to renumber their locomotives in order of size and wheel arrangements by hundreds.

On April 13, 1996, for the first time in thirty-four years, No. 28 was test fired and subsequently moved under its own power just in time for the official centennial of the Texas State Railroad itself. It would join other locomotives, including 2-8-2 No. 30 (No. 400), 4-6-2 No. 1316 (No. 500), and 4-6-0 No. 316 (201) as a tourist locomotive by pulling daily trips between Rusk and Palestine. No. 300 would also be one of the locomotives that would do the honors of pulling Texas and Pacific 2-10-4 No. 610 out of the Palestine shed and then push it back in by the end of the day. During the Christmas season, No. 300 would be decorated with deer antlers and tree branches for whenever it pulled the annual Polar Express train. With Numbers 400 (30) and 500 (1316) being removed from service in the early 2000s, No. 300 quickly became the TSRR's primary locomotive, as it remained the standard face of multiple advertisements for the railroad for the next several years.

In 2012, the TSRR was purchased by Iowa Pacific Holdings, who made the decision to revert all of the TSRR's steam locomotives to their original revenue liveries. The Pershing last ran as TSRR No. 300 in December 2013, right before it spent the 2014 operating season being painted black for one of its original identities, Southern Pine Lumber No. 28. The Western Group replaced Iowa Pacific Holdings as operator in May 2017 and was in turn replaced by Jaguar Transport Holdings of Joplin, Missouri in November 2020.

== Accidents and incidents ==
On July 6, 2007, No. 300 was making a West-bound trip from Rusk while it was parked in a sideline, awaiting RS-2 No. 7 to pass with an East-bound train from Palestine. One of the trucks on the last car of the east-bound train rolled into the sideline where the west-bound train was, and the rear end of the car hit the front of No. 300. No one was injured that day, and No. 300 was subsequently repaired and brought back into service.

== See also ==
- United States Army 101
- USATC S160 Class
- Southern Pacific 786
- Tennessee Valley Railroad 610
- Great Smoky Mountains Railroad 1702
