= Tremont and Gulf 30 =

Preserved American 2-8-2 locomotive

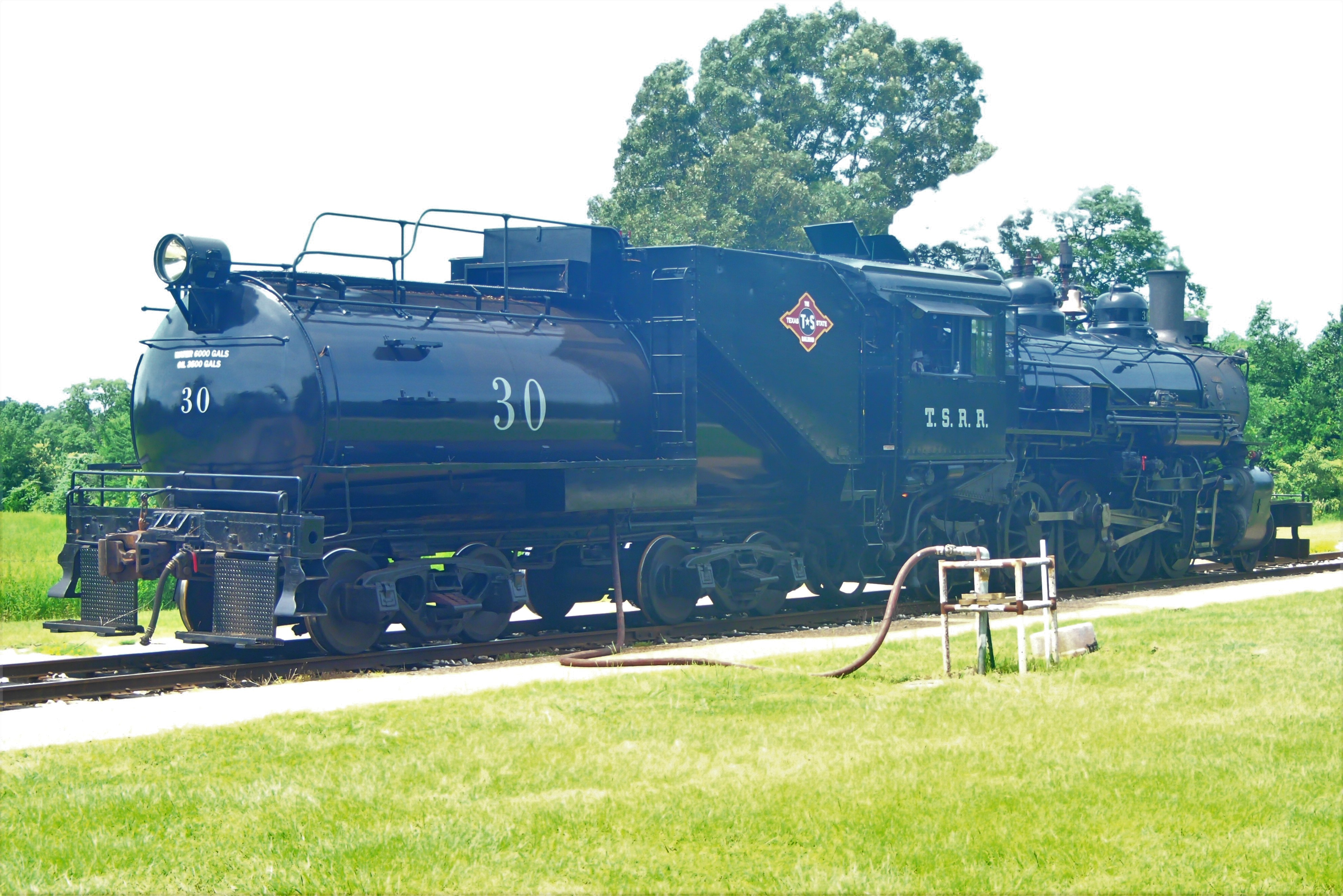
- No. 30 taking on fuel at Rusk on June 17, 2017
Type and origin
- Power type: Steam
- Builder: Baldwin Locomotive Works
- Serial number: 46491
- Build date: October 1917
Specifications
- Configuration
  - Whyte: 2-8-2
  - UIC: 1D'1
- Gauge: 4 ft 8 1/2 in (1,435 mm)
- Driver dia.: 54 in (1,400 mm)
- Wheelbase: 62.25 ft (18.97 m)
  - Engine: 30.58 ft (9.32 m)
  - Drivers: 14.50 ft (4.42 m)
- Adhesive weight: 140,000 lb (64,000 kg)
- Loco weight: 182,500 lb (82,800 kg)
- Tender weight: 126,500 lb (57,400 kg)
- Total weight: 309,000 lb (140,000 kg)
- Tender type: Vanderbilt type
- Fuel type: New: Coal; Now: Oil
- Fuel capacity: 14 t (14 long tons; 15 short tons) (Coal); 3,500 US gal (13,000 L; 2,900 imp gal) (Oil)
- Water cap.: New: 6,000 US gal (23,000 L; 5,000 imp gal); Now: 6,500 US gal (25,000 L; 5,400 imp gal)
- Firebox
  - Grate area: 41.50 sq ft (3.855 m^{2})
- Boiler pressure: New: 185 psi (1,280 kPa); Now: 175 psi (1,210 kPa)
- Heating surface
  - Firebox: 163 sq ft (15.1 m^{2})
- Superheater
  - Heating area: 518 sq ft (48.1 m^{2})
- Cylinders: Two, outside
- Cylinder size: 21 in × 26 in (530 mm × 660 mm)
- Valve gear: Walschaerts
- Valve type: Piston valves
- Loco brake: Air
- Train brakes: Air
- Couplers: Knuckle
Performance figures
- Maximum speed: 50 mph (80 km/h)
- Tractive effort: 33,987 lbf (151,180 N)
Career
- Operators: Tremont and Gulf Railroad; Magma Arizona Railroad; Texas State Railroad
- Class: 30
- Numbers: T&G 30; MAA 7; TSRR 400; TSRR 30
- Retired: September 4, 1968
- Restored: March 1978
- Current owner: Texas State Railroad
- Disposition: Operational

Tremont and Gulf Railroad 30 is a preserved 30 class 2-8-2 "Mikado" type steam locomotive, built by the Baldwin Locomotive Works (BLW) in October 1917 for the Tremont and Gulf Railroad (T&G). It was used by the T&G for hauling freight trains in branch lines throughout the state of Louisiana until 1954, when it was sold to the Magma Arizona Railroad and renumbered 7. There, the locomotive was used for hauling smaller freight trains in Southern Arizona, until its retirement in 1968. Afterwards, it continued to be sold to various owners and groups, until it was purchased by the Texas State Railroad in 1974. It was restored to operating condition and used to pull tourist excursion trips between Rusk and Palestine, Texas as No. 400 from 1978 to 2002. Since 2014, the locomotive has been back under steam on the TSRR as MAA No. 7, and then it was reverted to T&G No. 30 in 2017. It is still operational as of 2026 and was temporarily repainted into a commemorative scheme for the America 250 Event for the United States’ Semiquincentennial Anniversary.

== History ==
=== Revenue service ===
As the United States entered World War I, railroads across the nation faced a larger demand for larger and more powerful locomotives, and the Louisiana-based Tremont and Gulf Railroad (T&G) was no exception. Thus, in 1917, the T&G created a new design of a 2-8-2 "Mikado" type and ordered it from the Baldwin Locomotive Works of Philadelphia, Pennsylvania, and it was built and delivered in October of that year as No. 30. This new locomotive proved to be a more powerful unit than any of its predecessors, as it was capable of producing over 36,000 pounds of tractive effort, it had a boiler pressure of 185 pounds per square inch, it had superheaters with eleven inch piston valves, and it had a driver diameter of 54 inches. It wasn't suitable for mainline operations, but still a large enough size for small, basic-material sized shortlines like the T&G, and No. 30 was the largest locomotive the T&G has ever owned. An unusual detail for a late 1910s-built model was that the two sand domes and the lone steam dome had collars on both their bases and their tops, which gave the locomotive a 19th-century touch. No. 30 was used by the T&G to haul oil and lumber around the T&G system, particularly between Tremont, Winnfield, and West Monroe. As the 1950s began to progress, however, the T&G became one of many American railroads that decided to dieselize early on, and by 1954, all of their steam locomotives were withdrawn and sold off.

That year, No. 30 was purchased by another shortline railroad, the Magma Arizona Railroad (MAA). The locomotive then made its way to Magma, Arizona, where it was given another overhaul, and it was renumbered 7, as it was the seventh locomotive the MAA has ever acquired. The locomotive's new assignment was to haul copper, minerals, and local freight trains across the MAA system, particularly between the copper mines and towns of Florence and Queen Creek. No. 7 was also the most reliable unit of the roster when it came to running out of hills, such as the grade between Desert Well and the MAA-Southern Pacific interchange in Magma. Although, 2-8-0 No. 5 was the MAA's most powerful steamer. After serving the T&G for thirty-seven years and serving the MAA for an additional fourteen years, No. 7 completed its last revenue freight assignment on September 4, 1968, making it surpass Denver and Rio Grande Western K-36 locomotives Numbers 483 and 484 as the last common carrier steam locomotive to be used in revenue service in the Southwestern United States by over a month. Afterwards, No. 7 was sold to Steve Bogen in 1969, who, in turn, donated it to Trans North of Superior, Arizona in 1972.

=== Preservation ===
Upon arrival of Superior, No. 7 faced a future where it would remain as a static display piece. In 1974, however, the locomotive was purchased again by, the Texas Parks and Wildlife Department, the early founders of the Texas State Railroad (TSRR). No. 7 was only one of five steam locomotives the group had purchased and wanted to restore to operating condition as part of their efforts to reopen the TSRR as a tourist railroad. It was shipped by rail to Hahn and Clay in Houston, Texas to be rebuilt and refurbished by a group of volunteers. Boiler men, welders, and technicians took four years to repaint, repair, and replace components of the locomotive. When restoration work was almost completed, a new plate was made with the words "Rebuilt by Hahn & Clay Houston, Texas for the Texas Parks and Wildlife Department, Steam Locomotive No. 400, Type 2-8-2, Job No. 20078, State of Texas contract No. 09347, 1977–1978". During this process, the locomotive was also renumbered 400, since the TSRR decided to number their locomotives in order of size by hundreds. In March 1978, the locomotive was moved to its new home base of Rusk, where it was fired up for the first time in less than ten years.

=== Excursion service ===
The locomotive began being used to pulling tourist trains between Rusk and Palestine almost every year alongside other restored locomotives, including Texas and Pacific 4-6-0 "Ten-wheeler" No. 316 (No. 201), 2-8-0 "Consolidation" No. 28 (No. 300), Atchison, Topeka and Santa Fe 4-6-2 "Pacific" No. 1316 (No. 500), and RS-2 diesel switcher No. 7. It would also perform occasional doubleheaders with some of its running mates. In 1996, No. 400 took part in the centennial of the TSRR historical park, and since then, it was one of the TSRR's five steam locomotives to be featured in one of their 'symbols'. Since 1995, however, the Federal Railroad Administration (FRA) has ordered that every active steam locomotive be inspected and overhauled every 1,472 days.

On July 3, 2016, No. 30 (backdated as Magma Arizona Railroad No. 7) ran a Railfan Photographer's Special in celebration of the Texas State Railroad's 135th birthday, as well as a doubleheader run with No. 300 the following day.

In 2012, the TSRR was purchased by Iowa Pacific Holdings, who made the decision to revert all of the TSRR's steam locomotives to their original revenue liveries. The Western Group replaced Iowa Pacific Holdings as operator in May 2017 and was in turn replaced by Jaguar Transport Holdings of Joplin, Missouri in November 2020.

On April 20, 2026, No. 30 was briefly repainted into America 250 colors in celebration of the United States Semiquincentennial.

== Appearances in media ==
- While No. 30 operated as MAA No. 7, it masqueraded as a fictional "Verde and Rio Grande" locomotive after being selected as one of the starring locomotives for the famous 1962 Western adventure film How the West Was Won, which starred multiple famous actors, including Henry Fonda, Debbie Reynolds, and John Wayne, and it was directed by Henry Hathaway, John Ford, and George Marshall.
- While No. 30 operated as TSRR No. 400, it was re-lettered "Ozark and Panhandle" to appear in the 1982 TV film The Long Summer of George Adams, which starred James Garner, Joan Hackett, and it was directed by Stuart Margolin.
- In 2000, the locomotive was chosen to be in a new daring jump by Robbie Knievel. On the evening of February 23, he made the jump while No. 400 was in motion heading toward him and a ramp meant to be demolished by the locomotive.

== See also ==
- List of Louisiana railroads
- Magma Arizona Railroad
- Texas State Railroad
- Santa Fe 1316
- Southern Pine Lumber Co. 28
- Texas and Pacific 610
- Southern Pacific 786
