= United States Army 101 =

2-8-0 steam locomotive

US Army 101 General Pershing
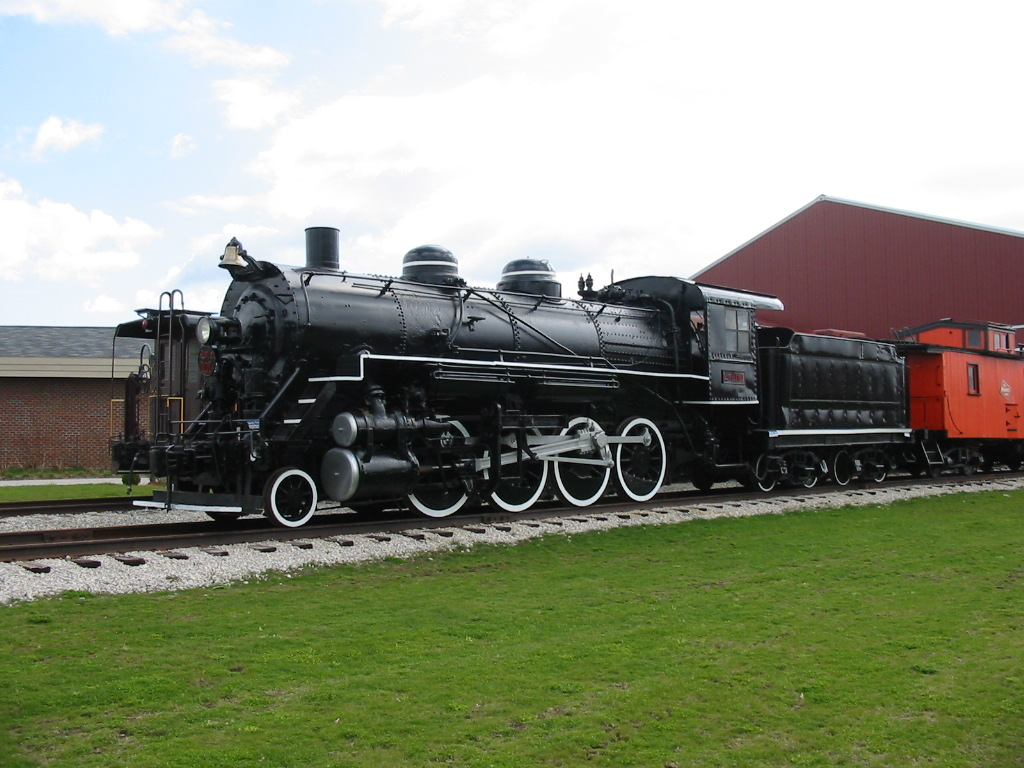
- US Army No. 101, a Consolidation-type 2-8-0 on display at the National Railroad Museum in 2004. This locomotive was built for use in France during WWI but never made it there. The original European-style cab was later replaced by an American-style one.
Type and origin
- Power type: Steam
- Builder: Baldwin Locomotive Works
- Model: 10-36E
- Build date: 1916–18
- Total produced: 1,500
Specifications
- Configuration
  - Whyte: 2-8-0
  - UIC: 1′D
- Gauge: 4 ft 8 1/2 in (1,435 mm) standard gauge
- Driver dia.: 56 in (1,422 mm)
- Wheelbase: 23 ft 8 in (7.21 m)
- Adhesive weight: 150,000 lb (68,000 kg)
- Loco weight: 166,400 lb (75,500 kg)
- Fuel type: Coal
- Water cap.: 5,400 US gal (4,500 imp gal; 20,000 L)
- Firebox
  - Grate area: 32.7 sq ft (3.04 m^{2})
- Superheater
  - Heating area: 420 sq ft (39 m^{2})
- Cylinders: Two, outside
- Cylinder size: 21 in × 28 in (533 mm × 711 mm)
- Valve gear: Walschaerts
- Valve type: Piston valves
- Loco brake: Air
- Train brakes: Air
- Couplers: Knuckle
Performance figures
- Tractive effort: 35,400 lbf (157 kN)
- Factor of adh.: 4.24
Career
- Operators: United States Army; Korean National Railroad
- Class: Pershing
- Numbers: USATC 101
- Retired: 1947
- Current owner: National Railroad Museum
- Disposition: On static display

US Army 101 is a 2-8-0 "Consolidation"-type steam locomotive that was originally operated by the United States Army. It is one of three survivors of the 1,500 General Pershing locomotives built in 1916–1918 for the War Department in World War I. The class was named after General John J. Pershing.

Number 101 went on to see action in three wars — World War I, World War II, and the Korean War. After the Korean War, it was operated by the Korean National Railroad, which designated it 소리2-101 (Sori2).

== History ==
As World War I broke out, railroads across the United States faced a larger demand for larger and more powerful locomotives to ship military equipment coast to coast, and railways across Europe also needed powerful locomotives to carry their own troops and military vehicles. The United States Army Transportation Corps designed a new class of a 2-8-0 "Consolidation" type with a design model of 10-36E.

US Army 101 was built for the US Army by Baldwin Locomotive Works (BLW) in 1918 and was used during World War I until it was donated to Korea in 1947.

In 1953, the 101 was recovered from damaged areas and reconstructed by the Army Transportation Corps, under the direction of Col. George Simpson. It was soon discovered that 101 was still property of the Korean Republic. Col. George Simpson, Harold T.I. Shannon, and Harold E. Fuller started talks with the Korean Republic about donating the engine to the National Railroad Museum.

In 1958, Korean Republic President Syngman Rhee donated the locomotive as a gift from the Korean people. On May 30, 1959, General Pershing was presented with a Certificate of Service from the Secretary of the Army.

It is one of only three surviving Pershing Class locomotives, the others being the Southern Pine Lumber Company No. 28 (or Texas State Railroad No. 300) and the CFR locomotive No. 140 117 in Romania.

== See also ==
- CFR
- Texas State Railroad
