= Union Pacific 737 =

Preserved American 4-4-0 locomotive

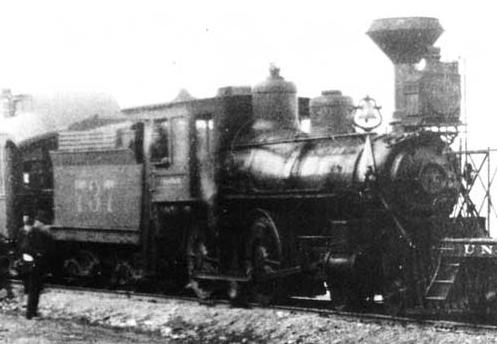
- UP No. 737, Ca. 1890
Type and origin
- Power type: Steam
- Builder: Baldwin Locomotive Works
- Serial number: 8395
- Build date: 1887
Specifications
- Configuration
  - Whyte: 4-4-0
  - UIC: 2′B n2
- Gauge: 4 ft 8 1/2 in (1,435 mm)
- Driver dia.: 62 in (1,575 mm)
- Adhesive weight: 62,000 lb (28,100 kg)
- Fuel type: New: Coal; Now: Oil
- Fuel capacity: Coal: 8 short tons (7.1 long tons; 7.3 t) as built, 14 short tons (13 long tons; 13 t) rebuilt Oil: 4,000 US gal (15,000 L; 3,300 imp gal)
- Water cap.: 2,000 US gal (7,600 L; 1,700 imp gal)
- Boiler pressure: 160 lbf/in^{2} (1.10 MPa)
- Cylinders: Two, outside
- Cylinder size: 18 in × 26 in (457 mm × 660 mm)
- Valve gear: Westinghouse
- Valve type: Side valve
- Loco brake: Air
- Train brakes: Air
- Couplers: Link-and-pin
Performance figures
- Tractive effort: 18,478 lbf (82.19 kN)
Career
- Operators: Union Pacific Railroad; Southern Pacific Railroad; Erath Sugar Company; Vermilion Sugar Company
- Class: UP 600–700, SP E-21
- Numbers: UP 737; UP 246; UP 216
- Delivered: 1887
- Retired: 1956
- Current owner: Double-T Agricultural Museum
- Disposition: On static display

Union Pacific 737 is a 4-4-0 "American" type steam locomotive. It is currently the oldest preserved Union Pacific steam locomotive. It was originally acquired by the Union Pacific Railroad (UP) in 1887.

== History ==
UP 737 began its career as part of one of the largest locomotive orders on record up to that date, for use on Union Pacific passenger and freight trains. As delivered, the locomotive had a long, pointed, vertical bar wooden pilot, an oil "box" headlight, a "diamond" stack of the shallow diamond style peculiar to the Union Pacific at that period. It had steam and sand domes that appeared comparatively square in profile and lacked the common, ornate, cast-iron dome "rings," a decorative molding that dressed up the appearance of such domes and that many 19th century locomotives sported. Upon entering service, the locomotive reportedly had the initials "O.& R.V." painted on the small panel below the windows on each side of the cab, standing for the name of a Union Pacific subsidiary in Nebraska, the Omaha and Republican Valley Railway. Later the locomotive had "Union Pacific" spelled out in small letters on each side of the cab, probably in white, and a large white "737" on each side of its black tender.

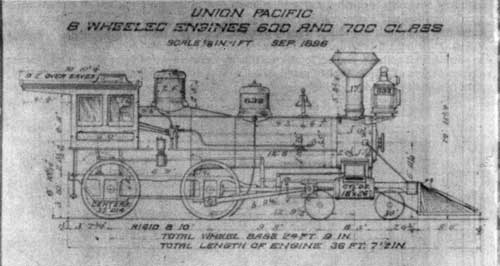
Union Pacific Railroad elevation showing the original configuration of Union Pacific #737. From the Union Pacific Railroad Folio Locomotive Diagram Book No. 200, issued in 1897 (courtesy Union Pacific Railroad).

In August 1904 (different sources disagree on the date), the Union Pacific Railroad sold Locomotive No. 737 and a few similar 4-4-0s to either Charles Morgan's Louisiana and Texas Railroad and Steamship Company or the Texas and New Orleans Railroad, both of them components of the Southern Pacific System. A Union Pacific Railroad folio locomotive diagram book issued in 1911 showed engines of this class as having had their diamond stacks replaced with straight or "shotgun" stacks, but whether that change had been made before the sale of Locomotive No. 737 is not known.

Locomotive No. 737 and some of her sisters migrated southward about 1904 to the Texas and Louisiana lines of the Southern Pacific Railroad, such as the Galveston, Harrisburg and San Antonio Railway, the Texas and New Orleans Railroad, and Morgan's Louisiana and Texas Railroad and Steamship Company. According to one source, No. 737 became No. 246, lettered "Morgan's Louisiana and Texas." Other sources suggest that it became a Texas and New Orleans Railroad locomotive. The Southern Pacific Company owned or controlled both of these Texas-Louisiana railroads, but the question of which subsidiary owned No. 246 is not unimportant, because it would have determined how the locomotive was lettered. In 1913, in a renumbering and reorganization of motive power, the Southern Pacific Company gave the locomotive its final number: No. 246 became No. 216. At the time, the locomotive probably was lettered "Southern Pacific Lines" in large white letters on her tender, with the number on the cab and the small initials to indicate the actual Southern Pacific subsidiary that owned her.

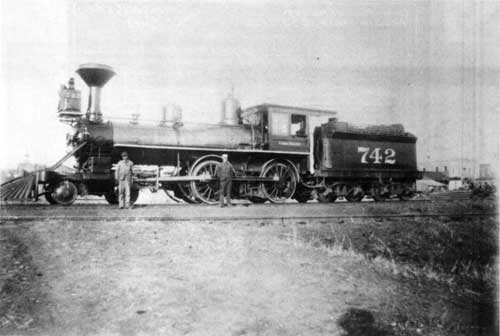
Union Pacific 742 (an identical sister of Union Pacific 737) showing the original appearance of the fireman's side.

During the first quarter of the 20th century, the owning railroads made a number of important modifications to Engine 246, later 216. By the end of 1904, subsequent to Congress passing a safety act that mandated the change, the Southern Pacific converted the locomotive's link and pin coupling equipment to automatic "knuckle" couplers, possibly of the Janney type. At unknown dates, a number of other changes followed as the locomotive experienced further modernizations quite common on railroads across the country during that time. Mechanics and boilermakers replaced the original short smokebox with an extended smokebox with shotgun stack. It was almost certainly on the Southern Pacific Lines that the shops converted the locomotive from a coal burner to an oil burner. An oil tank was installed in the tender in place of the coal bin and hoses and pipes to feed oil to the firebox were rigged, with suitable controls and probably modification of the firebox grates. Thus the locomotive could exploit Texas and Louisiana petroleum for fuel. A steel pipe or "boiler tube" pilot replaced the original wooden type of cowcatcher. An all-steel cab replaced the original Baldwin wooden cab. A new and different headlight replaced the old kerosene "box" headlight.

Locomotive No. 216 was retired on December 4, 1929 retired from active service on a major railroad system when it was sold by Southern Pacific Company to Erath Sugar for industrial use in the cane fields of Louisiana. In August 1947, Erath Sugar transferred ownership of No. 216 to the Vermilion Sugar Company at Abbeville, Louisiana. The Vermilion Sugar Company retired No. 216 in 1956.

=== Restoration ===
A New England seafood processor, F. Nelson Blount, bought the locomotive for his Steamtown, U.S.A. collection in 1957. To move the locomotive to Vermont on a flat car, it was necessary to cut off the roof of the steel cab to meet height clearance requirements, but Steamtown retained the cab roof, and moved it to Bellows Falls, Vermont. It was relocated in 1984 to the former Delaware, Lackawanna and Western Railroad's Scranton Yards at Scranton, Pennsylvania under the auspices of the Steamtown Foundation.

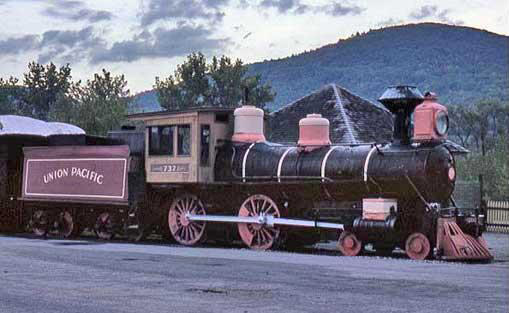
Union Pacific 737 on display at Steamtown, USA, after the 1970 restoration.

In 1970, Steamtown began an ill-conceived attempt to cosmetically restore the engine. A replica box headlight was installed, and a wooden cab was built overtop of the existing steel cab. Most significantly, a diamond stack replica was installed on the engine. This diamond stack was much shorter than the one the engine originally carried, and was of a different design from the original. Thus, the restored 737 bore little resemblance not only to its original form, but any form it had assumed during its service life.

On October 30, 1986 the U.S. Congress passed legislation creating Steamtown National Historic Site as a unit of the National Park Service, Department of the Interior. The newly created Park is located in the former Delaware, Lackawanna and Western Railroad yards in Scranton, Pennsylvania. In 1989, the Steamtown Foundation donated the remaining railroad collection, including UP 737, to the National Park Service. The National Park Service removed this locomotive from its property listings in August 1995 when it was donated to the Nevada Southern Railroad Museum at Boulder City, Nevada. The NSRM loaned the 737 to the Western Pacific Railroad Museum in Portola, who later acquired full ownership of the engine.

In 2004, the WPRRM traded the UP 737 to the Double-T Agricultural Museum in Stevinson, CA, where presently remains on static display. The engine was cosmetically restored to its 1914 appearance as Southern Pacific 216, with the straight, shotgun style smokestack, as well as the electric headlight and restored steel cab.
