= Santa Fe 1316 =

Preserved Santa Fe class 1309 4-6-2 locomotive

Type and origin
- Power type: Steam
- Builder: Baldwin Locomotive Works
- Serial number: 37332
- Build date: December 1911
- Rebuilder: Atchison, Topeka and Santa Fe Railway
- Rebuild date: March 1922
Specifications
- Configuration
  - Whyte: 4-6-2
  - UIC: 2'C1'
- Driver dia.: 73 in (1,900 mm)
- Wheelbase: 66.98 ft (20.42 m)
  - Engine: 35.08 ft (10.69 m)
  - Drivers: 13.67 ft (4.17 m)
- Axle load: 55,460 lb (25,160 kg) (Pre-1922); 55,900 lb (25,400 kg) (Post-1922)
- Adhesive weight: 160,900 lb (73,000 kg) (Pre-1922); 167,500 lb (76,000 kg) (Post-1922)
- Loco weight: 276,500 lb (125,400 kg) (Pre-1922); 277,000 lb (126,000 kg) (Post-1922)
- Tender weight: 185,400 lb (84,100 kg)
- Total weight: 461,900 lb (209,500 kg) (Pre-1922); 462,400 lb (209,700 kg) (Post-1922)
- Fuel type: New: Coal; Now: Oil
- Fuel capacity: 12 t (12 long tons; 13 short tons) (Coal); 3,300 US gal (12,000 L; 2,700 imp gal) (Oil)
- Water cap.: 9,000 US gal (34,000 L; 7,500 imp gal)
- Firebox
  - Grate area: 57.64 sq ft (5.355 m^{2}) (Pre-1922); 58 sq ft (5.4 m^{2}) (Post-1922)
- Boiler pressure: 210 psi (1,400 kPa) (Pre-1922); 225 psi (1,550 kPa) (1922-1954); 190 psi (1,300 kPa) (Post-1982)
- Heating surface
  - Firebox: 223 sq ft (20.7 m^{2}) (Pre-1922); 224.60 sq ft (20.866 m^{2}) (1922-1954); 195 sq ft (18.1 m^{2}) (Post-1982)
- Cylinders: Four (Pre-1922); Two, outside (Post-1922)
- Cylinder size: 23.5 in × 28 in (600 mm × 710 mm) (Post-1922)
- High-pressure cylinder: 17.5 in × 28 in (440 mm × 710 mm) (Pre-1922)
- Low-pressure cylinder: 29 in × 28 in (740 mm × 710 mm) (Pre-1922)
- Valve gear: New: Stephenson; Now: Walschaerts
- Valve type: Piston valves
- Loco brake: Air
- Train brakes: Air
- Couplers: Knuckle
Performance figures
- Tractive effort: 30,741 lb (13,944 kg) (Pre-1922); 39,650 lb (17,980 kg) (Post-1922)
Career
- Operators: Atchison, Topeka and Santa Fe Railway; Texas State Railroad
- Class: 1309
- Numbers: ATSF 1316; TSRR 500
- Retired: October 1954 (revenue service); 2002 (excursion service)
- Restored: 1981 (1st excursion service); 2020 (cosmetic)
- Current owner: Texas State Railroad
- Disposition: On static display, awaiting restoration

Atchison, Topeka and Santa Fe 1316 is a preserved 1309 class 4-6-2 "Pacific" type Steam locomotive, built by the Baldwin Locomotive Works (BLW) in December 1911 for the Atchison, Topeka and Santa Fe Railway (ATSF). It was frequently used for pulling fast passenger trains in Texas, until it was reassigned to freight service in the late 1940s. After being retired in 1954, it was donated to the Fort Concho Museum in San Angelo, Texas for static display. In 1980, No. 1316 was acquired by the Texas State Railroad (TSR), who moved it to Rusk, Texas and restored it in 1981 as their No. 500. It continued to operate there until 2002, when it was found to be due for an overhaul, and it spent several years in storage, disassembled. As of 2026, No. 1316 has been put back together during a cosmetic restoration and it is awaiting the necessary overhaul required to operate it again.

== History ==
=== Revenue service ===
From in the mid-1900s to the late 1910s, the Atchison, Topeka and Santa Fe Railway ordered a fleet of 329 4-6-2 "Pacific" types from the Baldwin Locomotive Works of Philadelphia, Pennsylvania, and the road's own facility in Clovis, New Mexico, divided into eleven classes. One class was the 1309 class, which consisted of twenty-eight locomotives, numbered 1309–1336. When these locomotives were initially built, they were Balanced compound locomotives with four cylinders, which had a short-lived popularity with multiple class 1 railroads, including the Santa Fe. However, the Santa Fe's own experimental compound designs were known for being plagued with various mechanical problems and design flaws, including the fact they couldn't produce as much speed or tractive effort as expected. As the 1920s progressed, the Santa Fe had all their compound designs deemed unsuccessful, and they were either sold for scrap or rebuilt into conventional locomotives. No. 1316 became the first of the 1309 class to be rebuilt into a simple locomotive at the railroad's Clovis facility in March 1922, and the last of the 1309 class locomotives were given the same treatment by November 1927.

The 1309 class Pacifics were initially assigned to pull fast passenger trains across the Santa Fe system, and No. 1316 mostly pulled trains throughout various parts of West Texas, including the City of San Angelo. As larger steam locomotives were being introduced, including the 3450 class 4-6-4 "Hudsons" and the 3751 class 4-8-4 "Northerns", most of the road's 4-6-2s were reassigned to secondary passenger service and commuter service. As diesel locomotives were becoming popular with the Santa Fe during the 1940s, the 1309 class locomotives were again reassigned to pulling local freight trains, mostly in shortlines. As the 1950s progressed, scrapping commenced on the Santa Fe 4-6-2 fleet. On October 18, 1954, the Santa Fe retired No. 1316 from revenue service after it logged some 1,347,383 miles, and shortly afterward, it was donated to the Fort Concho Foundation in San Angelo, Texas, one of the main stomping grounds the locomotive formerly ran through, and it was put on static display at the Fort Concho's Museum for the next twenty-six years. By the end of the decade, No. 1316 became the sole survivor of the 1309 class, as all of its classmates were scrapped.

=== Texas State Railroad ===
In 1976, the Texas State Railroad (TSRR), a former shortline that ran between Rusk and Palestine, Texas, was reopened as a tourist railroad by the Texas Parks and Wildlife Department. Four years later, while they had three operational steam locomotives by that point, management decided to find a slightly larger locomotive for their needs, and they ended up acquiring No. 1316. That summer, volunteers arrived at Fort Concho to prepare No. 1316 to be shipped by rail, and in the fall of that year, it was towed east-bound to their new facility in Rusk. When No. 1316 arrived in Rusk, restoration work began along with extensive modifications. During this process, the locomotive was also renumbered 500, since the TSRR decided to number their locomotives in order of size by hundreds, and until the arrival of Texas and Pacific 2-10-4 No. 610, No. 1316 was the largest of the TSRR roster. After a year of work, TSRR No. 500 moved under its own power in 1981 for the first time in twenty-eight years. The TSRR put No. 500 to use on daily trips between Rusk and Palestine alongside other locomotives, including 2-8-2 No. 400 (Tremont and Gulf 30), Pershing 2-8-0 No. 300 (Southern Pine Lumber Co. 28), 4-6-0 No. 201 (Texas and Pacific 316), 4-6-0 No. 200 (Southern Pacific 2248), and a small fleet of diesel units.

In 1995, the Federal Railroad Administration(FRA) introduced new federal boiler regulations and inspections for all active steam locomotives in the United States, and after twenty years of excursion service, and after participating in the centennial of the TSRR's service in 1996, No. 500 was sidelined in 2002 for its required FRA 1,472-day inspection and overhaul. The TSRR disassembled No. 500, only to find its boiler in poor condition after many years of usage, and instead of donating funds to repair it, the State of Texas offered the TSRR funds to build a brand new boiler that was designed for powerplant standards. However, due to a lack of time and money, and the fact their other steam locomotives had to be maintained as well, the FRA-required rebuild on No. 500 never came to fruition. In the fall of 2019, the TSRR announced that they would put No. 500 back together for cosmetic purposes for the general public to view, and this process included reverting the locomotive to its original identity as Santa Fe No. 1316. In early 2020, the cosmetic refurbishment was completed, and No. 1316 was put on static display in the "Hall of Giants" in Palestine side by side with No. 610.

== Film history ==
While it was still liveried as TSRR No. 500, No. 1316 was featured as one of the locomotives that pulled a passenger train in the 1986 comedy Western film Uphill All the Way, which starred Roy Clark, Mel Tillis, and Burl Ives, and it was directed by Frank Q. Dobbs. It was also used in the 1997 mini-series Rough Riders (miniseries) again as TSRR No. 500

== See also ==
- Santa Fe 3415
- Southern Pacific 786
- Tremont and Gulf 30
- Southern Pine Lumber Co. 28
- Texas and Pacific 610
