= Texas State Railroad =

Heritage railroad in east-central Texas

- No. 300 loading passengers at Rusk in October 2004

Overview
- Headquarters: Rusk, Texas
- Reporting mark: TSR
- Locale: Rusk-Palestine, Texas
- Dates of operation: 1883–1969; 1976–present

Technical
- Track gauge: 4 ft 8 1/2 in (1,435 mm)
- Length: 25 miles (40 km)

Other
- Website: texasstaterailroad.net

The Texas State Railroad (reporting mark TSR), also referred to as the Lone Star and Eastern Railroad, is a historic 25 mi (40 km) heritage railroad between Rusk and Palestine, Texas. Built by inmates, it was founded in 1883 by the state of Texas to haul raw materials for a smelter at the prison at Rusk. Regular service on the line was ended in 1921. The state leased the line to private companies until 1969, then turned it over to the Texas Parks and Wildlife Department in 1972. In 2007, the railroad was transferred to the Texas State Railroad Authority and is now operating as a scenic tourist line. It is currently operated on a limited, year-round schedule. Today, the railroad has a total of five steam locomotives (two of which are operational) and three diesel locomotives in their roster. The schedule of the railroad allows visitors to ride trains pulled by these locomotives between the park's Victorian-style depots in Palestine and Rusk and through the Piney Woods forests of East Texas. The Texas Legislature designated the Texas State Railroad as the official Railroad of Texas in 2003.

== History ==
The start of the railroad dates back to 1883, with the completion of the Rusk Penitentiary in Rusk, Texas. Built with inmate labor, the original purpose of the railroad was to transport raw materials for the iron smelter located at the Rusk Penitentiary. In 1906, the line reached Maydelle, and by 1909, the line was completed when it reached Palestine. The railroad grew and eventually expanded to freight and passenger service, but it was not profitable. Regular train service by the state ceased in 1921 and the line was leased to various railroad companies until 1969.

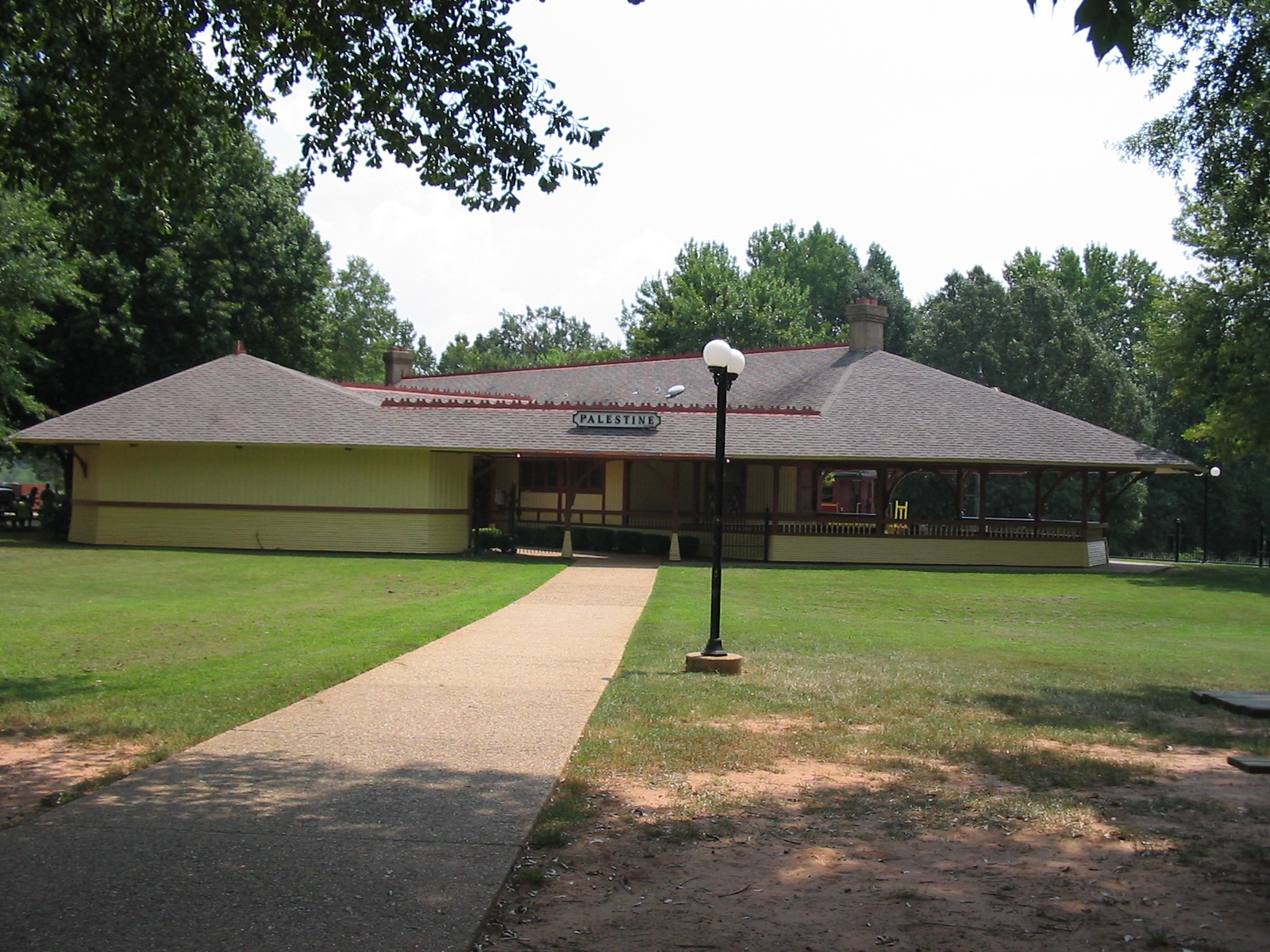
TSRR's Palestine Terminal

In 1972, the Texas Legislature turned the railroad over to the Texas Parks and Wildlife Department to be used as a state park. However, by 2006, the train cost the state of Texas $1 million per year more to maintain and to operate than the revenue from the park generated. Because of budget concerns, the Eightieth Texas Legislature (2007) passed Senate Bill 1659 which allowed for the creation of the Texas State Railroad Authority, and conveyed ownership of real estate and rolling stock to the Authority. The RoW was leased to the Authority for 99 years. The Authority leases operation of the line to qualified railroad operators. On September 1, 2007, the Texas State Railroad Authority leased the operations of the TSRR to American Heritage Railways, which also operates the Durango and Silverton Narrow Gauge Railroad (D&SNG) in Colorado and the Great Smoky Mountains Railroad (GSMR) in North Carolina.

In August 2012, American Heritage Railways abandoned the lease and Iowa Pacific Holdings leased operations. In addition to continuing passenger operations, Iowa Pacific Holdings opened the track to the main line in Palestine on November 1, 2012, to begin offering freight services. The Western Group replaced Iowa Pacific Holdings as operator in May 2017 and was in turn replaced by Jaguar Transport Holdings of Joplin, Missouri in November 2020.

On July 1–4, 2016, the railroad celebrated its 135th birthday.

On December 30, 2016, Iowa Pacific Holdings announced that tourist operations would be suspended due to forty employees being temporary laid off due to standard seasonal cost-reduction. Several laid off employees were re-hired the following month and tourist operations eventually resumed in March 2017.

== Texas & Eastern Railroad ==
In September 2012, the Surface Transportation Board approved an operating agreement between the Texas State Railroad Authority and the Rusk, Palestine & Pacific Railroad (RP&P) for the latter to perform common carrier freight service over the Rusk-to-Palestine line using the RP&P name. In May 2017, the line was leased to the Texas & Eastern Railroad to carry on the freight services, the RP&P being dissolved in January 2018. The freight trains bear the Texas & Eastern name, but the passenger excursions continue to operate under the Texas State Railroad name.

The Texas & Eastern interchanges with the Union Pacific at Palestine, and carries primarily construction aggregates, industrial products and chemicals.

== Equipment ==
=== Locomotives ===
Locomotive details
Number	Image	Type	Wheel classification	Class	Built	Builder	Serial number	Former owner	Status	Notes
316 / 201		Steam	4-6-0	D-9	1901	A.L. Cooke	26142	Texas and Pacific Railway	Display, awaiting overhaul	Formerly operated as TSRR No. 201. Awaiting future overhaul as of 2023.
28 / 300		Steam	2-8-0	Pershing	1917	Baldwin Locomotive Works	47032	U.S. Army, Tremont and Gulf Railroad, Southern Pine Lumber Co.	Undergoing running gear repair	Formerly operated as TSRR No. 300. Undergoing a boiler and running gear rebuild as of 2023.
30 / 400		Steam	2-8-2	Class 30	1917	Baldwin Locomotive Works	46491	Tremont and Gulf Railroad, Magma Arizona Railroad	Operational	Formerly operated as TSRR No. 400. Originally No. 30 for the Tremont and Gulf Railroad and No. 7 for the Magma Arizona Railroad.
1316 / 500		Steam	4-6-2	Class 1309	1911	Baldwin Locomotive Works	37332	Atchison, Topeka and Santa Fe Railway	Display, awaiting restoration	Formerly operated as TSRR No. 500. Cosmetically restored in 2020. Awaiting future overhaul as of 2023.
610		Steam	2-10-4	I-1AR	1927	Lima Locomotive Works	7237	Texas and Pacific Railway	Display	Operated on the American Freedom Train tour in 1976 and for the Southern Railway steam excursion program from 1977 to 1981.
1		Diesel	(B-B)	45-Ton	1947	General Electric	29207	Unknown	Operational	
7		Diesel	(B-B)	RS-2	1947	American Locomotive Company, Alco-GE	76828	Alcoa Aluminum Railroad, Southern Pacific Railroad	Operational	
8		Diesel	(C-C)	MRS-1	1953	American Locomotive Company, Alco-GE	80334	U.S. Army	Operational	
22		Diesel	(B-B)	70-Ton	1956	General Electric	32569	Texas South Eastern	Stored	
125		Diesel	(B-B)	FP9A	1957	General Motors Diesel Division	A1051	Canadian National Railway, VIA Rail	Operational	Originally built as CN No. 6521. Debuted at the Texas State Railroad in 2018.
126		Diesel	(B-B)	FP9A	1958	General Motors Diesel Division	A1393	Canadian National Railway, VIA Rail	Operational	Originally built as CN No. 6533. Debuted at the Texas State Railroad in 2022.

=== Former units ===
Locomotive details
Number	Image	Type	Wheel classification	Class	Built	Builder	Serial number	Former owner	Current owner	Status	Notes
2248 / 200		Steam	4-6-0	T-1	1896	A.L. Cooke	2312	Southern Pacific Railroad	Grapevine Vintage Railroad	Operational	It was operational on the TSRR as No. 200 before it was sold to the Fort Worth and Western Railroad in 1990.

== Accidents and incidents ==
- On July 6, 2007, No. 300 was making a West-bound trip from Rusk while it was parked in a sideline, awaiting RS-2 No. 7 to pass with an East-bound train from Palestine. One of the trucks on the last car of the east-bound train rolled into the sideline where the west-bound train was, and the rear end of the car hit the front of No. 300. No one was injured that day, and No. 300 was subsequently repaired and brought back into service.
- On September 18, 2020, an excursion train was making its return journey from Rusk to Palestine, Texas when several passengers cars derailed at approximately 2:35 p.m., 10 miles outside of the Palestine depot. There were no reported injuries and the passengers were safely transported back to the Palestine depot.

== Appearances in media ==
The railroad also has a long history in feature films, television series, special productions, documentaries, commercials and music including O Brother, Where Art Thou?, American Outlaws, The Long Riders, Gambler V:Playing for Keeps, Streets of Laredo, Rough Riders and episodes of NBC's Revolution.

== See also ==
- List of heritage railroads in the United States
