= Texas and Pacific 610 =

Preserved American 2-10-4 steam locomotive

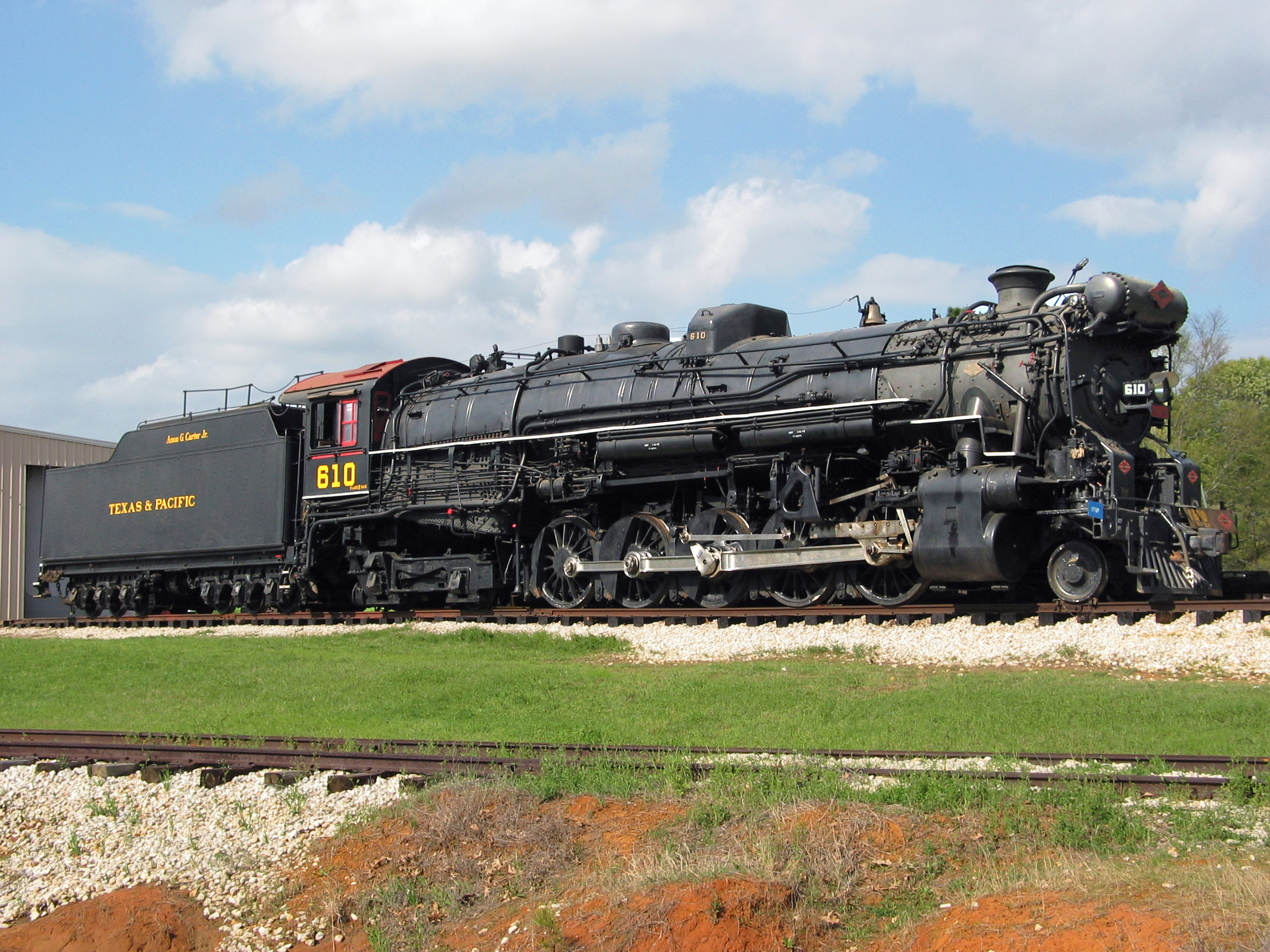
- T&P No. 610 on display at the Texas State Railroad Museum, on March 27, 2004
Type and origin
- Power type: Steam
- Designer: William E. Woodard
- Builder: Lima Locomotive Works
- Order number: 1101
- Serial number: 7237
- Build date: June 1927
- Rebuild date: August 1938
Specifications
- Configuration
  - Whyte: 2-10-4
  - UIC: 1′E2′ h2
- Gauge: 4 ft 8 1/2 in (1,435 mm) standard gauge
- Driver dia.: 63 in (1,600 mm)
- Length
  - Over couplers: 99 ft 1 in (30.20 m)
- Width: 10 ft 9 1/2 in (3.29 m)
- Height: 15 ft 5 3/4 in (4.72 m)
- Adhesive weight: 300,000 lb (140,000 kg; 140 t)
- Loco weight: 448,000 lb (203,000 kg; 203 t)
- Tender weight: 125,500 lb (56,900 kg; 56.9 t)
- Total weight: 573,500 lb (260,100 kg; 260.1 t)
- Fuel type: Oil
- Fuel capacity: 5,000 US gal (19,000 L; 4,200 imp gal)
- Water cap.: 14,000 US gal (53,000 L; 12,000 imp gal)
- Firebox
  - Grate area: 100 sq ft (9.3 m^{2})
- Boiler pressure: 255 psi (1,760 kPa)
- Feedwater heater: Elesco K-50A
- Heating surface
  - Firebox: 473 sq ft (43.9 m^{2})
  - Tubes and flues: 4,640 sq ft (431 m^{2})
  - Total surface: 7,213 sq ft (670.1 m^{2})
- Superheater
  - Type: Type E
  - Heating area: 2,100 sq ft (200 m^{2})
- Cylinders: Two, outside
- Cylinder size: 29 in × 32 in (737 mm × 813 mm)
- Valve gear: Baker
- Valve type: Piston valves
- Valve travel: 8 3/4 in (0.22 m)
- Loco brake: Air
- Train brakes: Air
- Couplers: Knuckle
Performance figures
- Maximum speed: 70 mph (113 km/h)
- Power output: 4,400 hp (3,280 kW; 4,460 PS)
- Tractive effort: Loco: 84,600 lbf (376.3 kN), Booster: 13,300 lbf (59.2 kN), Loco W/ Booster: 97,900 lbf (435.5 kN)
- Factor of adh.: 3.62
Career
- Operators: Texas and Pacific Railway; 610 Historical Foundation; Southern Railway
- Class: New: I-1A; Now: I-1AR
- Number in class: 1st of 15
- Numbers: T&P 610; AFT 610; SOU 610
- Official name: Will Rogers
- Retired: February 1950 (revenue service); October 1987 (excursion service)
- Restored: January 28, 1976
- Current owner: Texas State Railroad
- Disposition: On static display
- Texas & Pacific Steam Locomotive No. 610
- U.S. National Register of Historic Places
- Location within Texas Location within the United States
- Coordinates: 31.7407°N 95.5710°W
- Area: 1 acre (0.40 ha)
- NRHP reference No.: 77001477
- Added to NRHP: March 25, 1977

Texas and Pacific 610, also known as Will Rogers, is a I-1AR class 2-10-4 "Texas" type steam locomotive. It is the only surviving example of the Texas and Pacific Railway's (T&P) class I-1AR 2-10-4 locomotives. Built by the Lima Locomotive Works in June 1927, No. 610 and its class were based on Lima's prototype "Super Power" 2-8-4 design, and the T&P rostered them to pull fast and heavy freight trains.

No. 610 last ran for the T&P in 1950, before it was retired. It was then put on static display at the Will Rogers Memorial Coliseum in Fort Worth, Texas. In the late 1960s, No. 610 was at risk of being scrapped before the 610 Historical Foundation, a group of railfans, acquired the locomotive. In 1975, work began to restore No. 610 to operating condition, and the following year it pulled the American Freedom Train throughout Texas.

From 1977 to 1980, No. 610 was leased by the Southern Railway to pull excursion trains for their steam program. In 1981, No. 610 returned to Fort Worth under its own power. The following year, it moved to a small museum complex for display. In 1986, it was moved again to the Texas State Railroad in Palestine, Texas. As of 2026, No. 610 remains in storage under Texas State Railroad ownership, and it is towed outdoors for display during occasional events.

== Construction and design ==
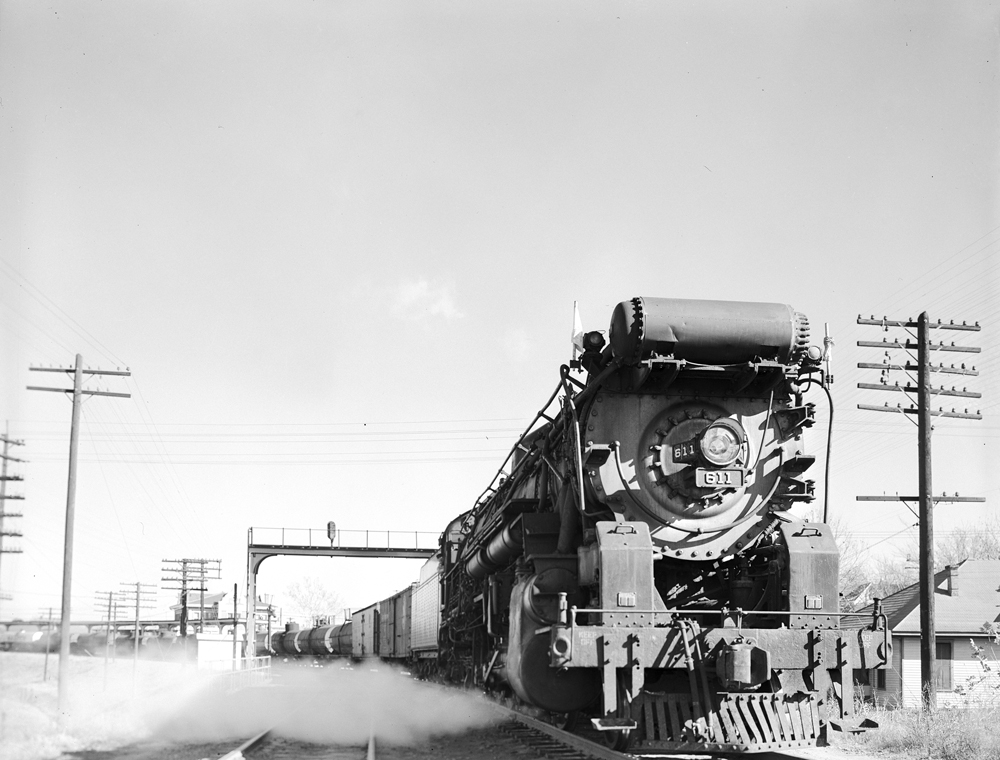
One of No. 610's I-1A sister locomotives, No. 611, pulling boxcars and tank cars through Marshall, Texas, 1946

During the 1920s, the Texas and Pacific Railway (T&P) was undergoing a restructuring process, under the guidance of the company's president, John L. Lancaster. Lancaster sought for the T&P to acquire faster and more powerful locomotives than their G-1 Class 2-10-2 "Santa Fe" types, to compete with intercity truck services and to assist the booming oil industry of Texas. In 1925, the Lima Locomotive Works of Lima, Ohio, constructed and demonstrated their prototype A-1 Class 2-8-4, which was designed by William E. Woodard and was proclaimed as a "super power" locomotive with its high horsepower output.

The A-1 was tested on trackage owned by the T&P's future parent company, the Missouri Pacific (MoPac), and after observing the A-1's performance, T&P executives became impressed. As a result, in June 1925, the T&P placed an order for ten copies of the A-1 to be built and delivered, but with ten driving wheels, instead of eight. They became the world's first locomotives to be constructed with a 2-10-4 wheel arrangement. (Note: The Santa Fe Railroad had previously rostered 2-10-4 locomotive No. 3829, but it was modified from a 2-10-2 design.) The new 2-10-4s (Nos. 600-609) were classified as I-1s, and the wheel arrangement was named the "Texas" type, on behalf of the T&P. They were equipped with several design features that were identical to those on the Lima A-1, including 63-inch (1,600 mm) diameter driving wheels, articulated side rods, articulated trailing trucks, and Baker valve gear.

The I-1s were equipped with 29-by-32-inch (737 mm × 813 mm) cylinders and a boiler pressure of 250 psi (1,724 kPa). They were able to produce 83,000 pounds-force (369 kN) of tractive effort, stretching to 96,000 pounds-force (427 kN) with the activation of their Franklin Railway Supply booster. When the T&P was satisfied with the performance of their I-1s in 1927, the railroad ordered fifteen more copies from Lima, built and delivered during the summer. These locomotives (Nos. 610-624) were classified as I-1As, since some of their design features were altered from those on the I-1s: their throttle type was changed to allow room for an ornate flange on the smokestack, and the boiler pressure was raised to 255 psi (1,758 kPa). This boosted the locomotives' tractive effort to 84,600 pounds-force (376 kN) (97,900 pounds-force (435 kN) via booster).

The T&P ordered additional altered batches of 2-10-4s from Lima; the I-1Bs (Nos. 625-639) in the spring of 1928, the I-1Cs (Nos. 640-654) in the summer of 1928, and the I-1Ds (Nos. 655-669) in the fall of 1929. At seventy locomotives, the T&P owned the largest fleet of 2-10-4s in the United States, until the introduction of the Pennsylvania Railroad's J1 Class in the early 1940s. The only major design flaw the T&P 600s had was their poorly counterbalanced driving wheels; at 45 miles per hour (72 km/h), the driving wheels would lift off the rails, so the locomotives received a speed restriction to travel at lower speeds, despite their abilities to travel at higher speeds.

In 1937, John Lancaster, who anticipated the outbreak of World War II and the ensuing military traffic, ordered for all seventy of the T&P 600s to be rebuilt at the railroad's Lancaster shops in Fort Worth to fix their counterbalancing issues and to extend their speed limit to 70 miles per hour (110 km/h). The locomotives received new valve pilots, lightweight nickel-steel main and side rods, and disc driving wheels shipped from the Baldwin Locomotive Works. The 600s also became equipped with steam and signal line equipment for passenger service. The rebuilding process took place between December 1937 and August 1941, and their classification names received an "R".

== History ==
=== Revenue service ===
No. 610 was the first locomotive of the I-1A class, built and delivered to the T&P in June 1927, at a cost of $106,656.41. No. 610 was mostly assigned in revenue service to pull heavy long-distance freight trains on T&P's 860-mile (1,380 km) mainline between Texarkana and El Paso, and en route, the locomotive traveled through the cities of Marshall, Longview, Dallas, Fort Worth, Abilene, Midland and Odessa. No. 610 also regularly pulled freight trains out of Shreveport, Louisiana.

No. 610 was originally restricted to operate below 45 miles per hour (72 km/h) because of its poorly-counterbalanced driving wheels. However, in August 1938, No. 610 was rebuilt in the Lancaster shops in Fort Worth with Baldwin disc driving wheels and lightweight nickel-steel rods to eliminate its speed restriction, and it was reclassified as an I-1AR. During World War II, No. 610 and other 600 locomotives were assigned to pull trains of military soldiers and war materials on the El Paso-Texarkana route and on the MoPac from Longview to Palestine, and beginning in 1939, they pulled trains from Fort Worth to Denison.

In 1945, John Lancaster retired from the T&P, and William G. Vollmer succeeded him as president. Under Vollmer's guidance, the railroad began to order diesel locomotives from the Electro-Motive Division (EMD) to replace their steam fleet. Having accumulated 1,152,872 miles (1,855,368 kilometres) in revenue service, No. 610 was retired from the T&P in February 1950. The railroad completely dieselized its operations the following year.

=== First retirement ===
In January 1951, after Fort Worth city mayor F. Edgar Deen requested to Vollmer that the T&P preserve a steam locomotive, Vollmer had No. 610 withheld from scrapping and donated to Amon G. Carter, a local publisher, art collector, and board chairman of the Southwestern Exposition and Fat Stock Show. Carter then donated No. 610 to the Southwestern Exposition, and arrangements were made to relocate the I-1AR to the exposition grounds near the Will Rogers Memorial Coliseum, with the Frisco Railway providing a spur line for the locomotive to enter the new display site. On January 27, No. 610 was put on static display at the show grounds, and a dedication ceremony was held in which the locomotive was named after humorist and commentator Will Rogers.

Following the ceremony, vandals began to remove parts from No. 610, but in 1952, Carter had a fence propped up around the locomotive for protection, and the exposition spent $500 to replace the missing parts. In 1955, No. 610 became the last remaining example of T&P's 2-10-4 fleet, since the rest of the 600 locomotives had been scrapped; I-1BR Class No. 638, which had been on static display at the State Fair of Texas in Dallas since December 1949, was scrapped after being heavily vandalized. Amon Carter died the same year, and without his protection, No. 610 was slowly tarnished by the outdoor elements in ensuing years. F. Edgar Deen also died in 1967. By 1968, both the Southwestern Exposition and Fat Stock Show and the city of Fort Worth had disavowed ownership of No. 610 as they were unable to maintain the locomotive.

Fort Worth residents feared a repeat of No. 638's scrapping, and they launched a campaign for the city to donate No. 610 to a group of railfans and experts who would be able to keep the locomotive in good condition. In April 1969, the Texas Christian University fraternity of Phi Delta Theta began to redevelop their property alongside the Will Rogers Coliseum, and in doing so, they planned to rip up the spur line that connected No. 610's display site to the national rail network.

In June 1969, local machine shop owner David F. Pearson learned that No. 610 was going to be isolated from the rail network, and he also feared the locomotive would be scrapped. He and a group of fellow railfans negotiated with the city of Fort Worth to obtain ownership of No. 610 for a token fee of $1, with the stipulation that it be moved out of the display site. No. 610 was subsequently moved to the Frisco Railway’s north side yards for temporary storage, and then it was moved again to the Fort Worth Army Depot. Dave Pearson sought to restore No. 610 to operating condition to pull excursion trains between Fort Worth and Dallas, and created a nonprofit organization called the 610 Historical Foundation to begin the project. The foundation launched a fundraising campaign to cover the initial estimated restoration cost of $10,000, and they began searching for steam locomotive experts for help.

In 1970, the 610 Foundation began negotiations with the T&P for permission to pull passenger excursions on its Dallas-Fort Worth mainline, but MoPac’s vice president-operations, E. L. Manion, declined to allow the group trackage rights, citing it would disrupt the safety and regular freight operations on the right-of-way, and all suitable facilities were unavailable. The foundation also negotiated with other railroads, including the Santa Fe and the Rock Island, for trackage rights to operate No. 610, but to no avail. During the early-mid 1970s, the 610 Foundation struggled to raise the required funds.

=== Renovation and American Freedom Train service ===
In the early 1970s, the cross-country American Freedom Train was being developed to celebrate the Bicentennial of the United States, and a nationwide search for a steam locomotive for pulling the train was underway. The 610 Foundation negotiated with the AFT Foundation to allow No. 610 to pull the Freedom Train throughout Texas and possibly other parts of the southwestern United States, including New Mexico and Oklahoma. By July 1974, Don Ball, the vice president for government and business relations for the AFT Foundation, promised that No. 610 would pull the train in Texas in early 1976, on the condition that its restoration be completed in time. On August 1, a new fundraising campaign was launched. No. 610's restoration was re-estimated to cost $100,000 to complete, with $75,000 being required to be donated from Texas residents; the cost was later reportedly finalized at $300,000.

Simultaneously, Dave Pearson had become close friends with Amon G. Carter Jr., who was a local investor and Amon G. Carter's son, and he had joined the 610 Foundation and began funding the project. On February 16, 1975, No. 610 was moved to the Fort Worth Stockyard Area, where the restoration process began the following month, with assistance from the Stockyards Area restoration committee. Pearson contracted Chicago-area railfan and steam locomotive mechanic Richard Jensen to lead the restoration process. Jensen had to acquire around 3,000 new custom-made parts to replace those on No. 610, while other parts of the locomotive were cleaned and refurbished. Many donations were made to the restoration, including $435 from a Western Hills Elementary School art show, and a private $50,000 loan was made for work to continue without stoppages.

On October 2, the locomotive's boiler passed a state government-required hydrostatic test. As further mechanical problems were addressed, No. 610's restoration ran behind schedule; the restoration was scheduled to be completed by December 1, but the deadline was postponed to January 1, 1976, and then to February. On January 28, restoration had been completed and the I-1AR moved under its own power within the Fort Worth rail yards the following day. The Fort Worth and Denver Railway (FW&D) subsequently requested that No. 610 be fitted with liability insurance coverage, but the insurance cost was $10 million, and the 610 Foundation only held $2 million. The AFT Foundation quickly obtained the required coverage from their insurance brokers in California.

On February 4, No. 610 performed its first test run on the FW&D mainline from Fort Worth to Wichita Falls with an idling EMD SD7, four boxcars, and a caboose, but en route, the locomotive broke down from one of its bearings near Alvord, and repairs delayed its arrival in Wichita Falls by two hours. On February 7, No. 610 returned to Fort Worth while pulling a freight train with the estimated weight of the Freedom Train, and the run occurred without incident. The AFT Foundation's plan for the Texas portion of the Freedom Train tour was for No. 610 to travel to Odessa, where it would be swapped with Southern Pacific (SP) 4-8-4 No. 4449 at the lead of the train, but the swap was moved to Austin at the last minute. On February 13, No. 610 travelled to Austin, and two days later, it was swapped with No. 4449 in front of the special train.

On February 18, No. 610, with assistance from Bicentennial GP18s Nos. 1776 and 1976, pulled the consist of MoPac's mainline from Austin to Houston. Prior to the Austin-Houston journey, it was discovered that the locomotive's brake shoes did not meet federal regulations, so brake shoes from the city of Austin's display locomotive, SP 2-8-2 No. 786, were acquired and applied to the I-1AR. On February 25, No. 610 pulled the Freedom Train on the Santa Fe mainline from Houston to Fort Worth, with assistance from Santa Fe Bicentennial SD45-2 No. 5704, but the journey had been delayed by a long line of people touring the consist in Houston.

On February 29, No. 610 pulled the Freedom Train into Dallas. On March 5, the locomotive returned to Fort Worth again, and it was swapped back with No. 4449, which pulled the AFT northbound to Wichita Falls. No. 610 was unable to operate beyond the Texas schedule, since extensive repairs on its crown brasses were required. Following the end of the AFT's Texas tour, the 610 Foundation continued to explore ways to operate No. 610 in excursion service, but railroads in Texas still declined to host steam excursions on their mainlines.

=== Southern Railway excursion service ===
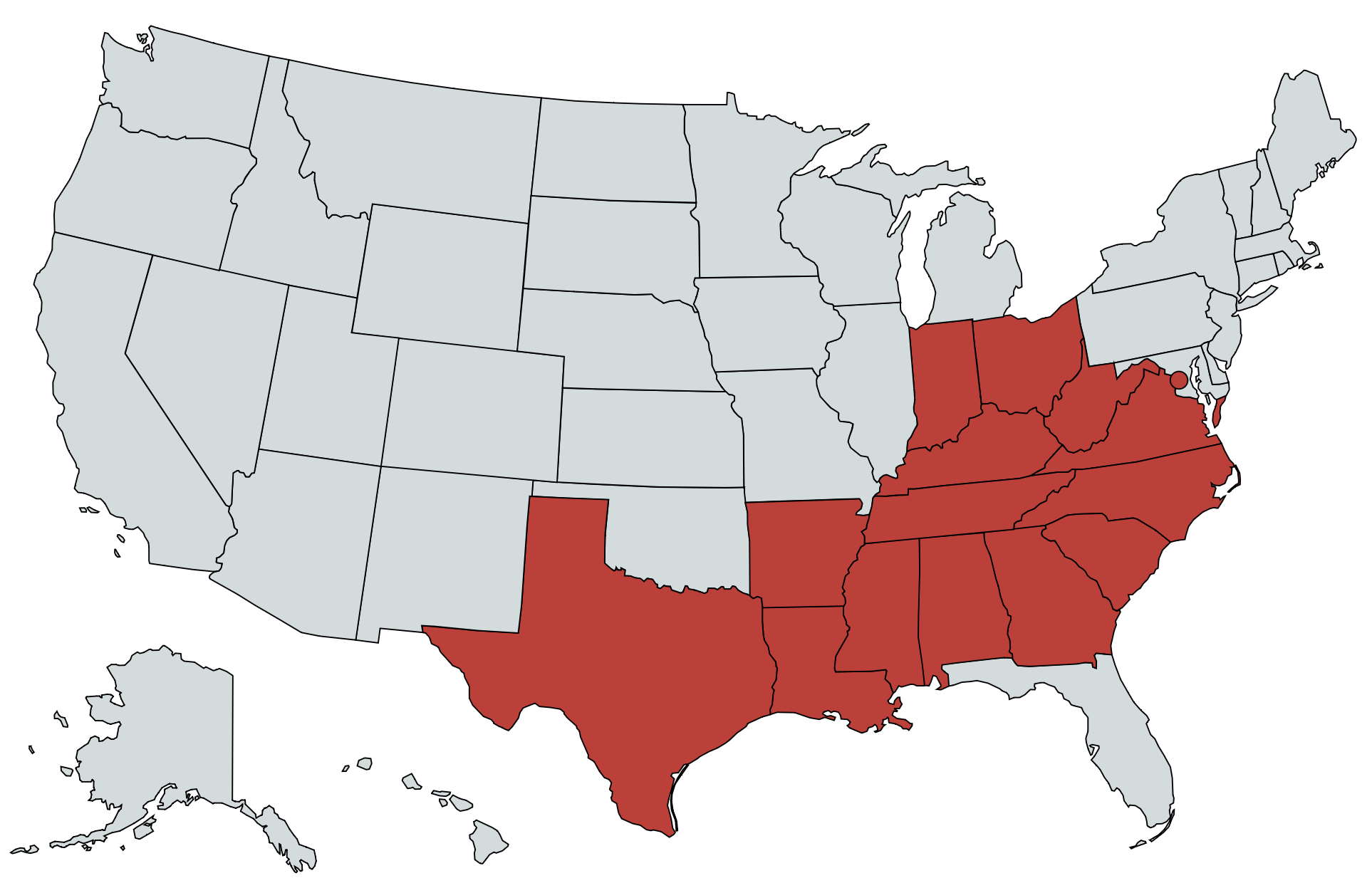
US states visited by No. 610 in excursion service

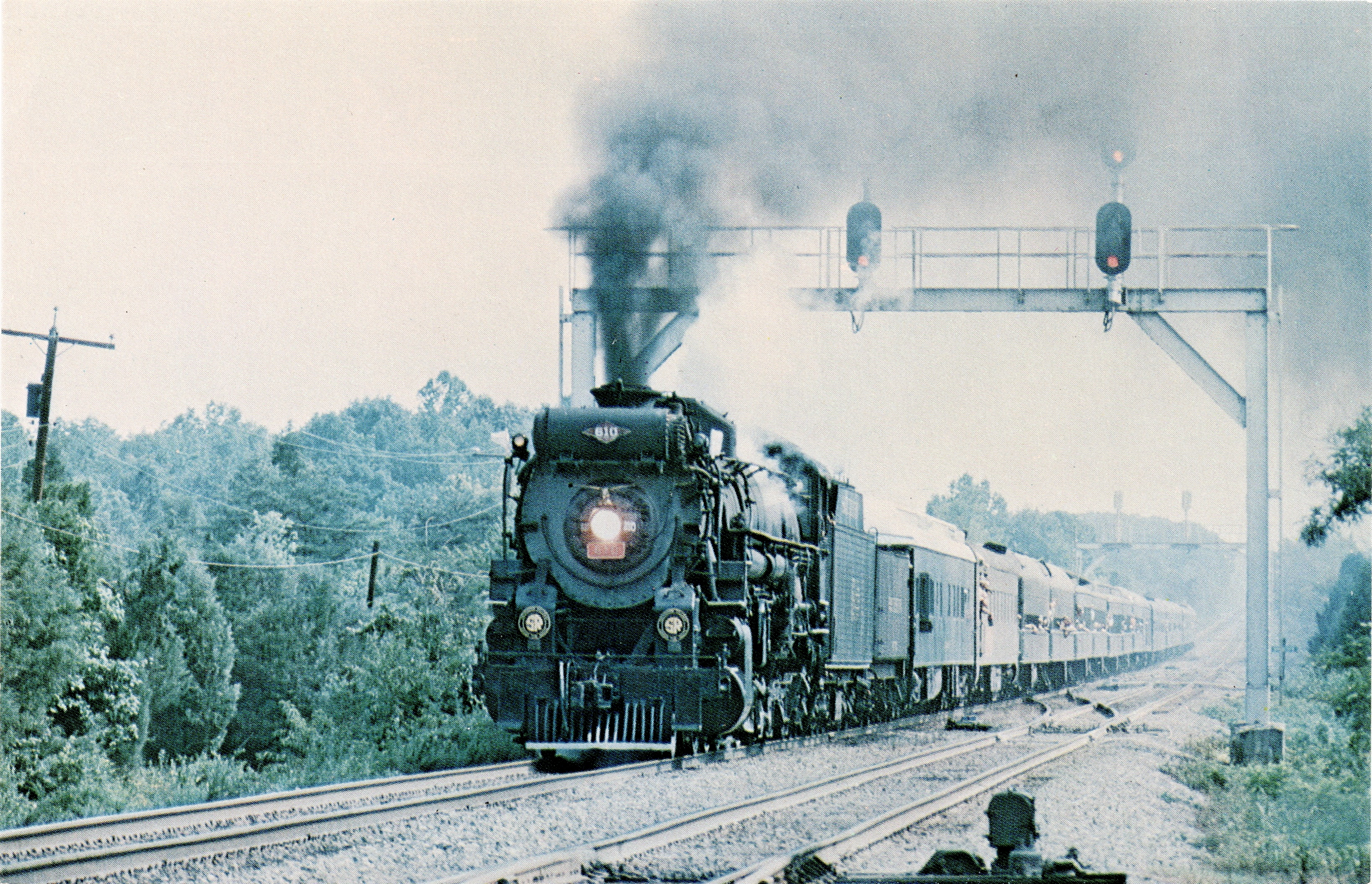
No. 610 pulling the Piedmont Limited/610 special excursion while performing its dynamometer test on the SOU, on August 20, 1977

Later in 1976, No. 4449, having swapped the Freedom Train consist with Ex-Reading 4-8-4 No. 2101, hauled an excursion for the Southern Railway (SOU), which hosted their own steam excursion program at the time, on its way to reunite with the Freedom Train at Washington, D.C.. Hosting No. 4449 made the SOU realize their growing excursion consists required a more powerful locomotive than their own smaller fleet (2-8-0s Nos. 630 and 722, 2-8-2 No. 4501, and Savannah and Atlanta 4-6-2 No. 750), so the railway offered to lease No. 4449. The AFT Foundation had to decline because they had already promised the city of Portland that they would return the locomotive to Oregon after the end of the tours. Doyle McCormack, who had been the engineer of Nos. 4449 and 610 during the AFT tours, suggested to SOU executives that they lease No. 610, instead. SOU steam program manager James A. Bistline, Master Mechanic Bill Purdie, and Don Purdie subsequently travelled to Fort Worth to examine No. 610's condition. By February 1977, the SOU and the 610 Foundation reached an agreement where the former would lease the locomotive for two years; the lease was later extended to three years.

In March, Bill Purdie drove No. 610 under its own power via the MoPac, the Illinois Central Gulf, and the SOU from Fort Worth to Birmingham, Alabama. At Mineola, Texas, the locomotive experienced a hot box that had to be repaired while it stopped at Shreveport, and then it had go through flooded areas in Mississippi. Upon arrival in Birmingham, No. 610 was moved to the SOU's Norris Yard workshop in nearby Irondale, where it was photographed in front of the building alongside Nos. 722, 4501, and 4449; the latter was on its return journey to Oregon with an Amtrak excursion. No. 610 was subsequently moved inside the workshop to be overhauled and prepped for its first excursion season for the railway. It received minor cosmetic decorations to symbolize its status on the SOU, including a brass eagle ornament above the front headlight, and a pair of round "SR" emblems on its air compressor shields.

No. 610 pulled its first excursions for the SOU on July 9–10, 1977: two roundtrips between Birmingham and Chattanooga, Tennessee, each train carrying more than 800 passengers. Trains magazine editor David P. Morgan subsequently requested to SOU president L. Stanley Crane that No. 610 operate with a test car in tow for a dynamometer test. On August 20, while No. 610 pulled the Piedmont Limited/610 special excursion from Alexandria to Monroe, Virginia, it towed SOU research car No. R-2, with a team of researchers recording the locomotive's horsepower output. The end results revealed that No. 610 was capable of generating 4,400 horsepower (3,300 kW); the same output as two EMD SD24s.

This excursion was also plagued with various problems: No. 610 derailed in the Alexandria yard and damaged its pilot axle, and the rerailing process delayed its departure by 1 hour; at Monroe, No. 610 had to be refueled because the pump between its tender and auxiliary car had seized up; at Remington, the locomotive burned out a brass and journal in its pilot truck, so it had to be sidelined for repairs, while a GP18 and a GP38-2 returned the train to Alexandria, with their combined horsepower being recorded; the problems postponed the train's return to Alexandria to 3:30 am. Crews subsequently had to replace No. 610's pilot bearings.

On September 1, No. 610 travelled to Roanoke to participate in the 1977 National Railway Historical Society (NRHS) Convention, but hot box issues delayed its arrival by seven hours. On September 3, No. 610 pulled a doubleheader excursion with SOU No. 4501 on the Norfolk and Western (N&W) mainline from Roanoke to Lynchburg, and No. 610 returned to Roanoke with five cars. On September 4, No. 610 pulled an excursion from Roanoke to Bluefield, West Virginia, but en route, as the locomotive traveled through Montgomery Tunnel, exhaust from its smokestack extinguished the fire in its firebox, and the locomotive's cab, crew, and first few passenger cars were blackened with smoke. After No. 610 drifted out of the tunnel, the fire had to be relit to continue the run to Bluefield.

The locomotive had to stay at Bluefield for servicing on its pilot truck, while N&W Bicentennial SD45 No. 1776 pulled the excursion to Cedar Bluff, and then No. 610 returned to Roanoke with No. 1776 and the excursion without incident. The I-1AR subsequently spent three days in the Roanoke Shops for necessary repairs, and oil from the tunnel incident was cleaned off. The I-1AR was then moved back to Birmingham to determine the cause of its hot box issues. It was revealed that after the locomotive had been raised and lowered during its renovation for the AFT, the pilot axle carried 5 tonnes (11,000 lb) above its normal axle loading.

By the end of 1977, the SOU steam excursions had carried 76,157 passengers, many of whom rode in trains behind No. 610. No. 610 lead additional excursions throughout 1978, including the long-distance Independence Limited in July from Lexington, Kentucky to Greensboro, North Carolina, but en route, near Hot Springs, a key flew off from one of the locomotive's crossheads, and it had to stay overnight in Asheville while a replacement key was fabricated. In November, No. 610 hauled another excursion from Birmingham to Sheffield, Alabama, but upon arrival, it broke down, and the return run was covered by diesels. At that point, SOU executives became ambivalent to No. 610's performance: although it was able to pull long passenger trains across the railway’s system at 60 miles per hour (97 km/h), it continued to suffer mechanical problems on some occasions. As a locomotive built to travel through open terrains, the 2-10-4 also could not navigate some of the sharp turns scattered throughout the SOU's network.

In 1979, the SOU began leasing and operating Canadian Pacific 4-6-4 Royal Hudson No. 2839 to phase out and later replace No. 610's usage in the program, but No. 2839 proved to be unsuitable in pulling the long excursions over the SOU's terrains unassisted. In 1980, the SOU decided to partially downsize their steam excursion fleet, and they began leasing Chesapeake and Ohio (C&O) 2-8-4 No. 2716 to replace Nos. 610 and 2839 in the program. Having accumulated 17,587 miles (28,304 kilometres) and carried 53,570 passengers on the SOU, No. 610 pulled its final excursion for the railway on January 24–25, 1981: a one-way excursion from Birmingham to Memphis, Tennessee. It subsequently pulled a boxcar full of spare parts to Fort Worth.

=== Location changes and second retirement ===
On January 29, No. 610 arrived at Fort Worth and was put into temporary storage near the Federal Records Center. Since nearby mainline railroads still refused to host steam excursions on their right-of-way, the 610 Foundation decided to search for a location to display No. 610. In July, the 610 Foundation reached an agreement with the General Services Administration (GSA) to lease some undeveloped land adjacent to the records center for twenty years, and they quickly began construction on a building to store the locomotive.

On April 4, 1982, following two delays from trackage issues, No. 610 traveled to the foundation's new building on the property, the Quartermaster Depot, where a dedication ceremony was held. The 610 Foundation began to prop the locomotive on public display during June, and they cooperated with the Trinity Valley Railroad Club to redevelop the storage site into a museum attraction akin to the Galveston Railroad Museum. Following the death of Amon Carter, Jr. in July, the 610 Foundation began losing money to keep No. 610 maintained, and although Pearson still continued to explore ways to run it, he lost faith in using the locomotive for excursion service.

During 1984 and 1985, a group in Dallas developed a $3 million-project called the Texas Independence Express, an exhibit train that was planned to celebrate the 1986 Texas Sesquicentennial, and No. 610 was chosen to pull the consist. But plans for the sesquicentennial train fell through after the group managed to raise only around $100,000, and surrounding railroads were reluctant to allow No. 610 on their mainline, fearing that its heavy weight would damage their computerized switches. During 1986, the GSA decided to redevelop the Quartermaster Depot property, so they ended their lease contract and the museum site where No. 610 sat had to shut down. With no sentiment to keep No. 610 maintained, the 610 Foundation decided to donate its locomotive in December to the Texas State Railroad (TSR), a tourist railroad that operates between Rusk and Palestine.

The Dallas group in charge of the cancelled sesquicentennial exhibit train donated their funds to help move No. 610, and the locomotive was removed from the Quartermaster Depot property and towed to the TSR's yard in Palestine. The TSR used other funds from the Texas sesquicentennial celebrations to expand their Palestine shop facility to allow storage space for No. 610. The TSR felt the No. 610 was too large for their small operations, but during the railroad's operating seasons they occasionally displayed the I-1AR near their depot for tourists and passengers to view. No. 610 performed one test run on the TSR's right-of-way in October 1987, and the railroad offered it for lease to people willing to operate it, but no lessors showed interest.

On August 19, 1989, No. 610 was designated as a Historic Mechanical Engineering Landmark for being the last remaining example of Lima's early Super Power locomotive design. In May 2001, the TSR hosted events celebrating three anniversaries including the 25th of No. 610 hauling the American Freedom Train.

== See also ==
- National Register of Historic Places listings in Anderson County, Texas
- Cotton Belt 819
- Nickel Plate Road 765
- Norfolk and Western 1218
- Santa Fe 1316
- Santa Fe 5000
- Union Pacific 3985

== Bibliography ==
- Boyd, Jim (February 1978). "Tales of a lanky Texan". Railfan. Vol. 2, no. 2. Carstens Publications. pp. 26–32.
- Mizell, Charles M. (February 1978). "T is for Texas, Texas & Pacific, and Two-Ten-Four". Trains. Vol. 38, no. 4. Kalmbach Publishing. pp. 22–32.
- Withuhn, Bill (February 1978). "The great dynamometer test of locomotive 610". Trains. Vol. 38, no. 4. Kalmbach Publishing. pp. 33–41.
- Wrinn, Jim (2000). Steam's Camelot: Southern and Norfolk Southern Excursions in Color (1st ed.). TLC Publishing. ISBN 1-883089-56-5.
- Warner, Warren E. (2008). The Texas State Railroad. Blurb, Incorporated. ISBN 978-1-3644-71996.
