= Cotton Belt 819 =

Preserved American 4-8-4 locomotive

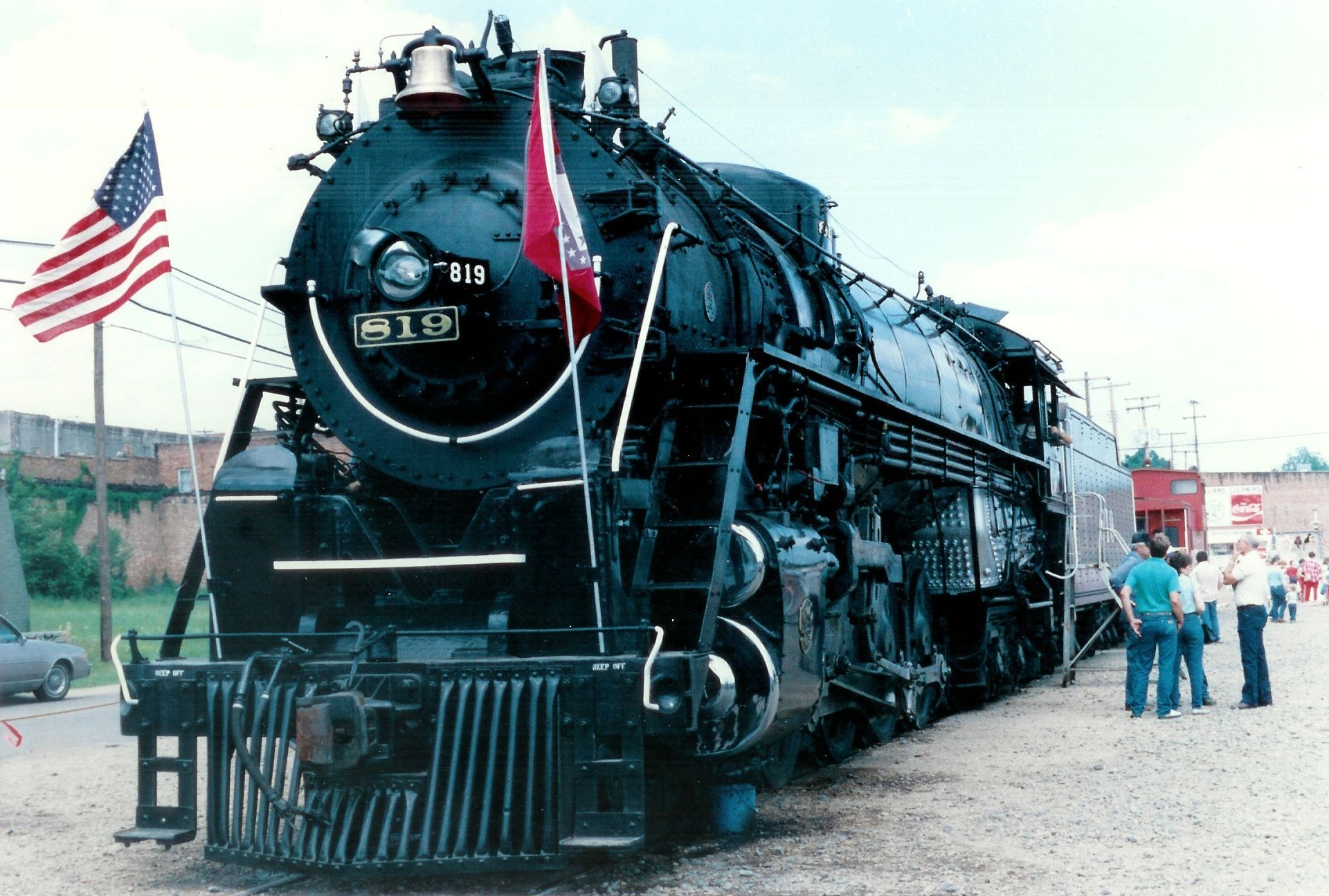
- Cotton Belt No. 819 attending the Cotton Belt Festival in Fordyce, Arkansas, during 1986.
Type and origin
- Power type: Steam
- Builder: Pine Bluff Shops; Baldwin Locomotive Works (boiler)
- Serial number: 819
- Build date: December 1942
Specifications
- Configuration
  - Whyte: 4-8-4
  - UIC: 2′D2′ h2
- Gauge: 4 ft 8 1/2 in (1,435 mm)
- Driver dia.: 70 in (1,778 mm)
- Length: Total: 99 ft 8 1/2 in (30.39 m); Tender: 38 ft 9 in (11.81 m)
- Width: 10 ft 5 5/8 in (3.191 m)
- Height: 15 ft 10 in (4.826 m)
- Axle load: 62,000 lb (28.1 tonnes)
- Adhesive weight: 248,000 lb (112.5 tonnes)
- Loco weight: 438,500 lb (198.9 tonnes)
- Tender weight: 312,000 lb (141.5 tonnes)
- Total weight: 750,500 lb (340.4 tonnes)
- Fuel type: Oil
- Fuel capacity: 5,000 US gal (19,000 L; 4,200 imp gal)
- Water cap.: 15,000 US gal (57,000 L; 12,000 imp gal)
- Firebox
  - Grate area: 88.3 sq ft (8.20 m^{2})
- Boiler pressure: 250 lbf/in^{2} (1.72 MPa)
- Heating surface
  - Firebox: 469 sq ft (43.6 m^{2})
- Superheater
  - Heating area: 1,962 sq ft (182.3 m^{2})
- Cylinders: Two, outside
- Cylinder size: 26 in × 30 in (660 mm × 762 mm)
- Valve gear: Walschaerts
- Valve type: Piston valves
- Loco brake: Air
- Train brakes: Air
- Couplers: Knuckle
Performance figures
- Tractive effort: 61,564 lbf (273.85 kN)
- Factor of adh.: 4.03
Career
- Operators: St. Louis Southwestern Railway; Cotton Belt Rail Historical Society
- Class: L-1
- Number in class: 20th of 20
- Numbers: SSW 819
- First run: February 8, 1943
- Retired: 1953 (revenue service); March 11, 1994 (1st excursion service)
- Preserved: July 19, 1955
- Restored: April 6, 1986 (1st restoration)
- Current owner: The City of Pine Bluff, Arkansas
- Disposition: In storage, pending restoration
- St. Louis Southwestern Railway Steam Locomotive #819
- U.S. National Register of Historic Places
- Location within Arkansas Location within the United States
- Location: 1720 Port Rd., Pine Bluff, Arkansas
- Coordinates: 34°13′37″N 91°59′5″W
- Area: less than one acre
- Built: 1943
- Built by: St. Louis Southwestern Railway
- NRHP reference No.: 03000401
- Added to NRHP: May 18, 2003

Cotton Belt 819 is a L-1 class 4-8-4 "Northern" type steam locomotive and is also the official state locomotive of Arkansas. It was completed in December 1942 and was the last steam engine built for the St. Louis Southwestern Railway, which was affectionately known as The Cotton Belt Route or simply Cotton Belt. It was also the last locomotive built in Arkansas. It was restored to operating condition in April 1986 and operated in excursion service until October 1993. As of 2026, the locomotive now resides at the Arkansas Railroad Museum, where future plans for it are being determined.

== History ==
=== Background ===
The Cotton Belt initially ordered ten "Northern" 4-8-4s, Nos. 800–809, from the Baldwin Locomotive Works located at Eddystone, Pennsylvania, in August and September 1930 at a cost of $110,849 apiece. These new Cotton Belt 4-8-4 locomotives were classified as the L-1s and intermingled with the Southern Pacific GS-1 class. The Cotton Belt then built five more L-1s, Nos. 810–814, from their own shops in Pine Bluff, Arkansas in 1937. Despite being similar to the ten Baldwin L-1s, these new locomotives had many modern improvements such as Boxpok driving wheels, multiple-bearing crossheads, and Timken roller bearings.

In 1942, the Cotton Belt officials petitioned the War Production Board for authorization to buy five new EMD FT diesel locomotives for their growing freight business. Work on the new L-1 Northerns began on Tuesday June 2, 1942, but the delivery of the boilers from the Baldwin Locomotive Works lagged. The five new boilers were shipped by Baldwin to Pine Bluff between November 5 and December 12, 1942. The rail journey from Philadelphia to Pine Bluff took about five days for each boiler. Work by the Cotton Belt shop forces took an additional five or six weeks to complete each new locomotive.

On February 8, 1943, the last of these five L-1 steam locomotives, No. 819, was placed in active service. It was the final locomotive constructed by the Cotton Belt's own staff of mechanical engineers, mechanical officers, foremen and workers in the company shops at Pine Bluff, Arkansas. The cost to build was $143,607.00 and it was to be the last locomotive produced in Arkansas.

Having traveled more than 804,000 miles (1,294,000 km) during its 10.5 years of service, No. 819 retired from revenue service in 1953. On July 19, 1955, Cotton Belt's President, H. J. McKenzie, donated No. 819 to the City of Pine Bluff to show the Cotton Belt's gratitude for the part the city had played in their steam locomotive operations. McKenzie commented that this model engine is generally conceded to be one of the best designed and most attractive of its type ever built. He recalled how the engine had been built by local craftsmen, who were very proud of them, and he hoped that the people of Pine Bluff would be equally proud to display it in their public park.

=== Retirement ===
In order to raise money for the cost of moving and constructing a permanent display structure for the engine, the City of Pine Bluff sold "shares" in the locomotive to the school children in Jefferson County. Children were requested to "buy" No. 819 by contributing one penny per pound (the locomotive and tender collectively weigh 750,500 pounds (340.4 t)) and were presented with cards signed by the mayor indicating the number of "shares" purchased. It had been estimated they needed to raise $4,000.00 for the concrete based, metal roofed, pipe framed shed surrounded by a concrete walkway and 6-foot-high (1.8 m) fence. The problem of getting the locomotive moved to the display was solved when Cotton Belt agreed to lend materials for a temporary spur to the park. Cotton Belt and Missouri Pacific employees contributed the labor in building the spur and moving the historic locomotive and tender.

However, just four years later, the Pine Bluff Commercial ran this note in the October 6, 1959 edition:

A Commercial newsman's inspection this week of the Cotton Belt locomotive permanently on display on a site between Oakland and Townsend Parks revealed the old steam engine has been neglected by the city. When the railroad donated the engine to the city it did so with the stipulation that the locomotive would receive proper care. Not only had the engine been allowed to deteriorate through rust, the effects of the weather in non-metal portions and acts of vandalism, but the grounds have been allowed to grow up around the fenced-in area so that visitors must trudge through weeds to get an up-close look at the locomotive.

It took most of a year to improve No. 819's situation. It was decided to move the engine to a new location approximately 150 yards west of its old spot, near the front of the Reserve building. The Pine Bluff Jaycees spearheaded the drive to build a green and white steel shed at the new location, while the move and reconditioning was being coordinated by members of the Brotherhood of Railroad Trainmen and Cotton Belt employees. Several civic organizations talked of undertaking the project of restoring the engine to better condition, only to find out that such a project required technical know-how that only railmen possessed. That was when BRT stepped in and offered to assist with the engine.

"Before we're through," one of the men said "that old engine will look just like it did the day it rolled out of the shop she was built in. We hope to have her fixed where she'll be better taken care of, too."

During the move to her new location between Townsend and Oakland Parks, No. 819 "broke loose" and coasted down an incline on her temporary track. The locomotive, after starting to coast, rammed the park's lake embankment and finally stopped against a large black oak tree. The workmen labored the next day to get the engine back on her rails and into place. Crews stated they expected to have the locomotive in her new quarters in about two more weeks.

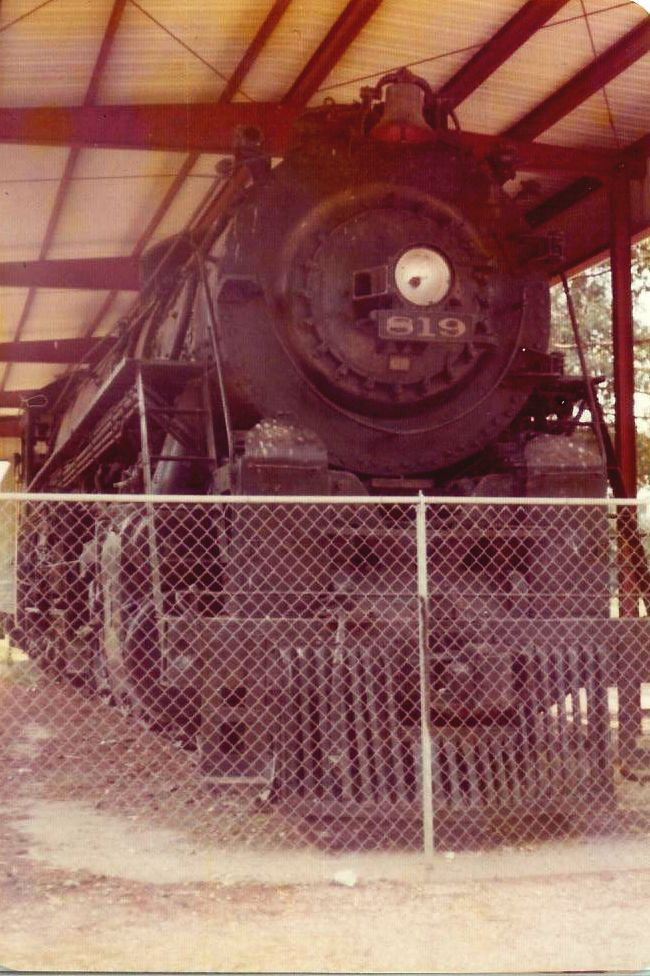
No. 819 under the shed in Townsend Park.

Although the engine and its tender were successfully relocated during the fall of 1960, it was several more years before the steel shed was erected overhead to protect the locomotive. In addition to the Pine Bluff Jaycees, the City of Pine Bluff and the Pine Bluff Park Commission each donated $500. Pine Bluff Mayor Franks personally donated $250 and another $250 was donated by the Townsend Park Commission. Gene Gardner, an engineer with International Paper, designed the green and white steel shed and drew up the plans for it. International Paper Company and the Pine Bluff Sand & Gravel Company furnished the concrete footings for the shed, while Varco Steel did the construction work. Construction of the shed was completed in September 1965 when a chain-link fence was installed, and the landscaping was finished.

Upon completion of No. 819's new home, Mayor Austin Franks shared one of the two keys to the gate with long-time railfan James Norris. Norris' father had taken the locomotive out for her first run in 1943 and young James always remembered his late-father when he saw the engine. Despite being in his late 50s and in failing health, Norris faithfully visited the locomotive every week to knock off the bird nests and occasionally replace some broken glass in the cab. He would open the gate on Sundays while he was there to let kids climb on the locomotive, ring the bell and answer their many questions.

"Every time I come out here, I can see my daddy standing right on that step." Norris said, "It kinda gets down in your heart".

It is uncertain when Mr. Norris' health got so bad that he could no longer continue his weekly maintenance visits to the No. 819, but he admitted in 1965 that his doctor had told him to stay away from the locomotive. Records indicate that Mr. Norris died in 1970 and by 1983 the Arkansas Democrat described the locomotive as "covered in graffiti and vandals have removed, or tried to take, whatever wasn't too heavy to carry off." Miss Arkansas of 1958, Sally Miller Perdue, from Pine Bluff complained "It had been abandoned and stripped of all its dignity. It has become the iron-horse that was put out to pasture, neglected and abused."

Ms. Perdue, whose family had a long history with the railroad, agreed to chair a sub-committee of the Chamber of Commerce's Publicity and Tourism to get the No. 819 rejuvenated and relocated. With a slogan of "Let's Put the Steam Back in Pine Bluff", she felt that a lot of volunteers, mainly retired Cotton Belt craftsmen and engineers, would be interested in working to restore the No. 819. Superintendent R. R. McClanahan of the Cotton Belt Pine Bluff Division worked hard to get the locomotive and tender transported from the park back to the shops to make those repairs.

=== Return to the Cotton Belt shops ===
On December 1, 1983, a force of between 50 and 100 Cotton Belt employees, most of them volunteers, assisted by railfans and rail historical groups, placed Engine 819 back on Cotton Belt rails for the first time in nearly three decades and transported the engine 3 1/2 miles (5.6 km) from the park back to the site of its manufacturing 40 years earlier. Members of the newly formed Cotton Belt Rail Historical Society moved the locomotive back to the Cotton Belt shops, where it was to be restored in a bold project to show Arkansans what past gigantic locomotives looked like.

Although the ownership of the locomotive was retained by the city, the restoration of the 819 was the responsibility of Project 819, an all-volunteer effort by two rail historical preservation groups: the Arkansas Railroad Club and the Cotton Belt Rail Historical Society. The project leased space needed at the Cotton Belt shops in Pine Bluff to complete the restoration, which was projected to take 18–24 months.

While the engine languished in the park, various parts disappeared including its bell, whistle, Cotton Belt emblems and many of the gauges. Jake Commer, President of the Cotton Belt Rail Historical Society at the time, offered a "no questions asked" policy for the return of these items and received many of the parts back, including the whistle and one of the emblems. The original bell was never located however and the one currently on the engine is from another 800 class locomotive. That bell was used for many years by the Wesley United Methodist Church in Pine Bluff before being donated to Project 819.

Led by Bill B. Bailey, the Restoration Director for Project 819, seven separate volunteer groups worked six days a week on various sections of the locomotive and tender in hopes of getting the engine totally restored and federally certified as worthy to run on the rails again. Mr. Bailey estimated that about 20% of the volunteers had actually worked on the locomotive or went through an apprenticeship in the early 1940s when the 819 or other 800-class steam locomotives were built in the Cotton Belt Shops at Pine Bluff.

=== First restoration and excursion service ===
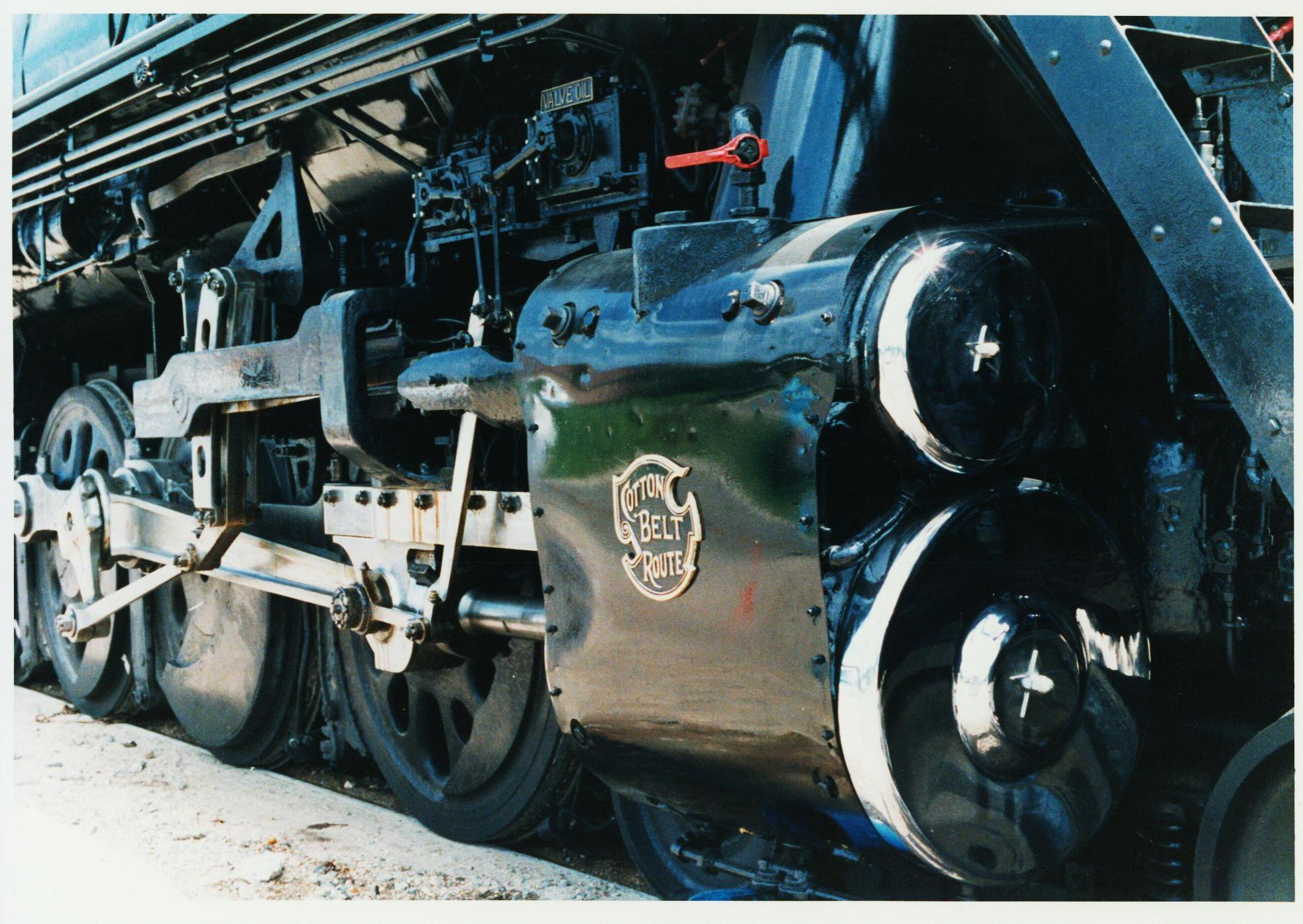
A close-up of No. 819's cylinders & valve gear.

On April 6, 1986, No. 819 moved out of the Cotton Belt Route's yard at Pine Bluff marking the first time it had moved under its own power since 1953. The large crowd gathered at the railyard, including a number of railroad employees, burst into applause and shouted their approval as the locomotive's nose emerged from the shop building with the American and Arkansas flags affixed to the locomotive. Members of the Cotton Belt Railroad Historical Society invested over 35,000 man-hours into this restoration project. Jake Commer praised the efforts the Cotton Belt Route had extended, stating "They helped us so much I can't even begin to tell you about all of it. If it hadn't been for the railroad, we couldn't have done it."

Twenty days later, on April 26, 1986, No. 819 pulled into Fordyce on her first full-fledged trip out of Pine Bluff in 31 years. School children from Pine Bluff, Rison, Kingsland and Fordyce waved and shouted their delight at the engine. Cars of railfans followed the train's path, taking pictures.

On June 13, 1986, No. 819 participated in the Arkansas State Sesquicentennial with a trip to Little Rock and was perhaps Pine Bluff's most visible contribution to the weekend events marking the state's 150th birthday. In addition to Pine Bluff's Mayor Robinson, Louis Ramsay – Chairman of the state's Sesquicentennial Commission – and Judge Earl Chadick Sr. of Jefferson County, Hillary Clinton also rode up from Pine Bluff in the opulent VIP car named "The Houston" on loan from the Cotton Belt. Governor Bill Clinton joined his wife and the other riders on board when the train slowed to a crawl behind Barton Coliseum, just minutes from Little Rock's Union Station. Engine 819 spent the weekend on display at Union Station, just a few blocks north of the state capitol, as part of Arkansas' Sesquicentennial celebration, before returning to Pine Bluff.

During the summer of 1986, film crews came to Pine Bluff for the production of the Orion Pictures film End of the Line. No. 819 played a minor role along with 35 Pine Bluff residents turned-actors, many of them members of the Cotton Belt Rail Historical Society who had helped restore the steam engine. Arkansas-born actress Mary Steenburgen was the film's executive producer, who worked hard to be able to use the newly restored locomotive for the movie. On August 27, Pine Bluff residents were treated to a special premiere showing of the film at the Pine Mall Cinema. Proceeds from the $5.00 tickets were given to the Cotton Belt Rail Historical Society.

On June 12–13, 1990, No. 819 hauled a 14-car excursion from Pine Bluff to St. Louis, Missouri, and en route, the locomotive made a whistle salute with 2-4-2 No. 5 at a level junction in Delta. No. 819 then participated in that year's National Railway Historical Society (NRHS) convention held at the former St. Louis Union Station, where it was exhibited alongside Frisco 1522, Union Pacific 844, and Norfolk and Western 1218. On June 17, No. 819's excursion consist was temporarily combined with half of No. 1218's consist, and the former lead a convention excursion from St. Louis to Illmo. From there, the extra consist was returned to St. Louis, while No. 819 returned with its normal consist to Pine Bluff.

No. 819 ran its final excursion train from Pine Bluff to Tyler, Texas, and return in October 1993, and it was last fired up on March 11, 1994.

=== Disposition ===
No. 819 on display at the Arkansas Railroad Museum in late May 2025.

On May 18, 2003, No. 819 became listed on the National Register of Historic Places.

The locomotive is partially disassembled for its mandated 15-year Federal Railroad Administration inspection. The boiler has been “ultra-sounded” and documented, with only a small area of the firebox remaining to be checked. The flue tubes were removed with plans made for their replacement. A sudden increase in material costs and various emergency repairs needed at the museum over the years have exhausted funds that were hoped to be used to complete the project. The locomotive sat idle inside the museum, awaiting its return to steam and possible future travels.

In March 2021, the Arkansas State Legislature passed an act designating No. 819 the official locomotive of Arkansas with the hope that the passing of this act would encourage and provide for future funds for a restoration to operating condition and protection for the locomotive.

On September 22, 2026, No. 819 was moved outside the museum's building for the first time in 32 years. The Rail Dynamics Group (RDG) were on site to evaluate the condition of No. 819 to determine its future.

== Bibliography ==
- Boyd, Jim (February 1989). "Ridin' on the Cotton Belt". Railfan & Railroad. Vol. 8, no. 2. Carstens Publications. pp. 40–43, 54–55.
- Strapac, Joseph A. (1977). Cotton Belt Locomotives (1st ed.). Shade Tree Books. ISBN 0253336015.
