= Southern Pacific 786 =

Preserved SP MK-5 class 2-8-2 locomotive

Type and origin
- Power type: Steam
- Builder: American Locomotive Company (Brooks Works)
- Serial number: 55972
- Build date: August 1916
Specifications
- Configuration
  - Whyte: 2-8-2
  - UIC: 1'D1' h2
- Gauge: 4 ft 8 1/2 in (1,435 mm)
- Leading dia.: 33 in (840 mm)
- Driver dia.: 63 in (1,600 mm)
- Trailing dia.: 41 in (1,000 mm)
- Wheelbase: 80.17 ft (24.44 m)
  - Engine: 35.17 ft (10.72 m)
  - Drivers: 16.50 ft (5.03 m)
- Length: 84 ft (26 m)
- Adhesive weight: 213,380 lb (96,790 kg)
- Loco weight: 285,980 lb (129,720 kg)
- Tender weight: 156,100 lb (70,800 kg)
- Total weight: 442,080 lb (200,520 kg)
- Fuel type: Oil
- Fuel capacity: 2,940 US gal (11,100 L; 2,450 imp gal)
- Water cap.: 9,000 US gal (34,000 L; 7,500 imp gal)
- Firebox
  - Grate area: 70.40 sq ft (6.540 m^{2})
- Boiler pressure: New: 200 psi (1,400 kPa); Now: 210 psi (1,400 kPa)
- Heating surface
  - Firebox: 235 sq ft (21.8 m^{2})
- Superheater
  - Heating area: 865 sq ft (80.4 m^{2})
- Cylinders: Two, outside
- Cylinder size: 26 in × 28 in (660 mm × 710 mm)
- Valve gear: Walschaerts
- Valve type: Piston valves
- Loco brake: Air
- Train brakes: Air
- Couplers: Knuckle
Performance figures
- Tractive effort: 53,629 lb (24,326 kg)
- Factor of adh.: 3.98
Career
- Operators: Southern Pacific Lines; Texas and New Orleans Railroad; Austin Steam Train Association
- Class: Mk-5
- Numbers: SP 786
- Retired: 1955 (revenue service); July 1999 (1st excursion service)
- Restored: December 1991
- Current owner: Austin Steam Train Association
- Disposition: Undergoing restoration to operating condition

Southern Pacific 786 is a preserved 2-8-2 "Mikado" type steam locomotive, built in August 1916 by the American Locomotive Company's (ALCO) Brooks Works in New York. It was used to pull mainline freight trains by the Texas and New Orleans Railroad (TNO), a subsidiary of the Southern Pacific Railroad (SP), until it was removed from service in 1955, and it was donated to the city of Austin, Texas the following year. Beginning in 1989, No. 786 was leased to the Austin Steam Train Association, who restored it to operating condition, and the locomotive was used to pull excursion trains on the Austin Western Railroad (AWRR) until 1999. Since 2000, crews have been performing an extensive rebuild on No. 786 to bring it back to service, and as of 2026, the rebuild continues to progress.

== History ==
=== Revenue service ===
In the 1910s, the Southern Pacific Railroad (SP) designed a new class of 2-8-2 "Mikado" type locomotives for one of their subsidiary companies, the Houston and Texas Central Railway (H&TC). This new class was the MK-5 class, which consisted of fifty-seven locomotives. No. 786 was the twelfth of twenty MK-5s to be ordered from the American Locomotive Company's (ALCO) Brooks Locomotive Works in Dunkirk, New York, and it was constructed in August 1916. The following year, 1917, No. 786 was transferred to another SP subsidiary, the Texas and New Orleans Railroad (H&TC), and they subsequently assigned No. 786 to pull mixed freight trains on their mainline trackage between Houston, Austin, and Galveston.

The locomotive received multiple modifications while being overhauled for several times during revenue service, including its original extended smokebox being shortened in the 1920s, its boiler pressure being increased from 200 to 210 pounds per square inch on March 1, 1931, and a reception of a worthington feedwater heater system and superheaters on November 29, 1941. After serving the T&NO for thirty-nine years, No. 786 was retired in late 1955. On March 24, 1956, No. 786 was donated to the city of Austin for static display purposes, and it would remain at a vacant lot behind the Central Fire Station between 4th and 5th Streets for the next thirty-four years. In 1976, No. 786 was stripped of its original brake shoes, which were sold to the American Freedom Train foundation for emergency usage on Texas and Pacific 610.

=== Excursion service ===
In 1989, the Austin Steam Train Association (ASTA) was incorporated with the intention of recreating historic passenger railroading in Central Texas. The ASTA, being led by Arthur U. Boone, subsequently approached an agreement with the city of Austin to lease No. 786 to restore it to operating condition. In February 1990, No. 786 was moved from its display site to the Westinghouse Motor Company in Georgetown.

Four months later, a team of both professional and volunteer crews began performing an extensive rebuild on the locomotive, under the supervision of Robert Franzen and Gary Bensman. The initial restoration on No. 786 lasted less than two years. In December 1991, No. 786 made its first test runs by pulling one passenger car toward downtown Austin to take part in a celebratory festival. It wasn't until July 25, 1992, when No. 786 pulled its first official passenger excursion train between Burnet and the ASTA's location in Cedar Park.

After its first official inaugural run, No. 786 has pulled several excursion trains over the Austin Western Railroad (AWR), including the occasional Hill County Flyer train. For the next seven years, the locomotive had operated for the ASTA for over 60,000 miles while carrying thousands of passengers. No. 786 was also featured in the video, "What Do You Want To Be When You Grow Up? The Railroaders Edition".

On May 27, 1997, No. 786’s tender, which had been uncoupled from the locomotive for a drawbar inspection, was toppled onto its side by a tornado that struck Cedar Park. The locomotive remained upright and intact, and a subsequent inspection revealed that the tender received only minor superficial damage. Crews used a crane to reposition the tender, and then four days later, on June 1, No. 786 returned to service with its tender repaired. In July 1999, No. 786 was removed from excursion service after crews discovered a crack in its cylinder saddle casting. The ASTA initially planned to weld the crack within a 90-day period, but after it was determined the damage was unrepairable, the group opted to replace the saddle with a newly-cast duplicate.

=== 21st century rebuild ===
In October 2000, the city of Cedar Park began donating thousands of dollars to the ASTA, with $205,658.61 to rebuild No. 786. The locomotive was soon disassembled, with the boiler being lifted onto wooden blocks, and the sections of the frame were separated to be sandblasted before all of the locomotive's components were shipped by truck to the Steam Operations Corporation (SOC) of Muscle Shoals, Alabama. The ASTA had contracted SOC and the Strasburg Rail Road to help construct two brand new cylinder saddles for No. 786, since the original saddles were found to be corroded beyond economical repair. The locomotive's boiler was also being rebuilt at the Historic Machinery's shop in Steele, since the firebox had been worn out and needed to be refurbished, and the flues, tubes, superheaters, and staybolts needed to be replaced.

By the end of 2008, New cylinder saddles had been cast, and they were machined in order to fit onto the frame. The driving wheels were sent to the Tennessee Valley Railroad Museum in Chattanooga, Tennessee to be fitted with new tires. During the spring of 2009, a new smokebox section has been fabricated, a new trailing axle has been cast, and every remaining original part that was still in good condition was sandblasted and machined. By the beginning of 2010, the rebuild on the locomotive's boiler has been completed, and it has passed a hydro test. In December 2011, the cylinder saddles have been permanently mounted onto the rest of the locomotive frame.

In the spring of 2013, all of No. 786's components have been shipped by truck back to Cedar Park with the hopes of beginning the reassembly process of the locomotive's class 5 rebuild. As the 2010s progressed, the smokebox door was reinstalled onto the boiler, the frame was covered to be protected from the weather and elements, the wheels were painted black, and any corroded component on No. 786's tender was replaced. As of 2025, the rebuilding process on No. 786 is still in progress. The frame has been completely painted, the cab is being rebuilt, the boiler has been re-primed, and ASTA has hired FMW Solutions to aid with the restoration.

== See also ==
- Southern Pacific 745 (Another preserved SP MK-5 class locomotive)
- Southern Pacific 2467
- Southern Pacific 2472
- Santa Fe 1316
- Santa Fe 3415
- Oregon Railroad and Navigation 197
