= List of preserved locomotives in the United States =

This is a list of preserved locomotives in the United States, organized by state then city or town of their last-known locations. It is intended to list all locomotives that are listed on the National Register of Historic Places or other heritage registers, or that are preserved and displayed or stored or operated at museums or heritage railways. This includes locomotives on cog railways, but is not intended to cover self-propelled railcars or multiple units or locomotives of miniature railroads.

== Preserved locomotives ==
The permanent or usual locations are identified by coordinates where possible; these locations may be seen together by clicking on "Map all coordinates using: OpenStreetMap" at the right side of this page.

	Locomotive	Image	Type	Dates	Location	Notes
AL-01	St. Louis-San Francisco Railroad Locomotive 4018		Steam 2-8-2 USRA Light Mikado	1919 built	Sloss Furnaces, Birmingham, Alabama	
AL-02	ALCO Boxcab Locomotive 11		ALCO Boxcab	1926 built	North Alabama Railroad Museum, Huntsville, Alabama	The ALCO boxcabs were diesel-electric switcher locomotives, otherwise known as AGEIR boxcabs as a contraction of the names of the builders. Produced by a partnership of three companies, ALCO (American Locomotive Company) built the chassis and running gear, General Electric the generator, motors and controls, and Ingersoll Rand the diesel engine. The principle of operation was the same as modern locomotives, the diesel engine driving a main generator of 600 volts DC with four traction motors, one per axle.
AR-01	Central Texas Gravel Locomotive No. 210		GE 25-ton switcher	1956 built 2007 NRHP	Arkansas Railroad Museum, Pine Bluff, Arkansas; 34°13′46″N 91°59′6″W	General Electric-built diesel-electric switch locomotive, well-preserved example of the second generation of GE's 25-ton switching locomotives, a popular model used widely in freight yards throughout the nation and internationally.
AR-02	Kansas City Southern Railway Locomotive No. 73D		EMD F7A	1950 built 2006 NRHP	AR 59 S of Church Ave., Decatur, Arkansas; 36°20′13″N 94°27′40″W	Diesel-electric locomotive used until 1991.
AR-03	Tennessee, Alabama & Georgia Railway Steam Locomotive No. 101		Steam 2-8-0	1922 built 2007 NRHP	NW. of Jct. of N. Main St. & Union Pacific RR., Fordyce, Arkansas; 33°48′46″N 92°24′42″W	Last surviving locomotive of the Fordyce and Princeton Railroad
AR-04	Maumelle Ordnance Works Locomotive No. 1			1942 built 2006 NRHP	100 S 4th St., Fort Smith, Arkansas; 35°23′08″N 94°25′50″W	Gasoline-mechanical, used by Department of War at ordnance-manufacturing facility during 1942-45.
AR-05	United States Air Force Locomotive No. 1246		GE 44-ton switcher	1953 built 2006 NRHP	Fort Smith Trolley Museum, Fort Smith, Arkansas; 35°23′7″N 94°25′47″W	Diesel-electric switcher which served Grissom Air Force Base
AR-06	St. Louis San Francisco (Frisco) Railway Steam Locomotive No. 4003		Steam 2-8-2 USRA Light Mikado	1919 built 2004 NRHP	In front of Fort Smith Trolley Museum, Fort Smith, Arkansas; 35.38546°N 94.42996°W	
AR-07	St. Louis Southwestern Railway (Cotton Belt Route) Steam Locomotive No. 336		Steam 2-6-0 D3	1909 built 2007 NRHP	Arkansas Railroad Museum, 1700 Port Rd., Pine Bluff, Arkansas; 34°13′37″N 91°59′04″W	
AR-08	St. Louis Southwestern Railway Steam Locomotive No. 819		Steam 4-8-4 Cotton Belt Class L-1	1943 built 2003 NRHP	1720 Port Rd., Pine Bluff, Arkansas; 34°13′37″N 91°59′05″W	Last engine built by the St. Louis Southwestern Railway, the "Cotton Belt Route".
AZ-01	Southern Pacific Railroad Locomotive No. SP 2562		Steam 2-8-0 C-9	1906 built 2009 NRHP	Arizona Railway Museum, Chandler, Arizona	NRHP-listed in Maricopa County
AZ-02	Atchison, Topeka and Santa Fe Railroad Locomotive 3759		Steam 4-8-4 3751	1928 built 1986 NRHP	Kingman, Arizona	
AZ-03	Southern Pacific Railroad Locomotive 2355		Steam 4-6-0 T-31	1912 built	Pioneer Park, Mesa, Arizona	
AZ-04	Southern Pacific Railroad Locomotive No. 1673		Steam 2-6-0 M-4	1900 built 1991 NRHP	Southern Arizona Transportation Museum, Tucson, Arizona; 32.22371°N 110.96760°W	Had starring role in Oklahoma! (1955 film).
AZ-05	Grand Canyon Railway 29		Steam 2-8-0 SC-3	1906 built	Grand Canyon Railway, Williams, Arizona	
AZ-06	Grand Canyon Railway 4960		Steam 2-8-2 O-1A	1923 built	Grand Canyon Railway, Williams, Arizona	
CA-01	Robert Dollar Co. No. 3		Steam 2-6-2T	1927 built	Brightside, California	Last wood-burning locomotive built for a U.S. company; operates on Niles Canyon Railway.
CA-02	Hetch Hetchy 6		3T Shay locomotive	1921 built 1978 NRHP	CA 140, El Portal, California; 37°40′27″N 119°47′11″W	
CA-03	California Western 45		Steam 2-8-2	1924 built	Fort Bragg, California; 39.44550°N 123.80690°W	Engine of the Skunk Train from Fort Bragg to Willits, California.
CA-04	Southern Pacific 18		Steam 4-6-0 narrow-gauge	1911 built by BLW	Operational, based in Independence, California	
CA-05	Southern Pacific 9		Steam 4-6-0 Narrow gauge	1909 by BLW	Laws Railroad Museum, Laws, California	Oil-burning. One of three called "The Desert Princess" and/or "Slim Princess" (with SP 8 and SP 18).
CA-06	Atchison, Topeka, and Santa Fe Railway Steam Locomotive No. 3751		Steam 4-8-4 3751	1927 built 2000 NRHP	2435 E. Washington Blvd. 34°1′2″N 118°13′31″W; Los Angeles, California	
CA-07	Gov. Stanford or "Central Pacific 1"		Steam 4-4-0	1862 built	Static display California State Railroad Museum, Sacramento, California; 38.584722°N 121.504444°W	Central Pacific locomotive used in construction of the First transcontinental railroad.
CA-08	C. P. Huntington		Steam 4-2-4T	1863 purchased	Static display, California State Railroad Museum, Sacramento, California; 38.584722°N 121.504444°W	First locomotive of Central Pacific Railroad.
CA-09	CP 233		Steam 2-6-2T	Stored, California State Railroad Museum, Sacramento, California		
CA-10	Southern Pacific 1237		Steam 0-6-0 S-10	1918 built by BLW	Static display, east of Amtrak Depot, Salinas, California	An oil fired yard switcher, served Southern Pacific from 1918 to 1956, then donated to Salinas
CA-11	Union Pacific 737		Steam 4-4-0 "American"	1887 built	Static display, Double-T Agricultural Museum, Stevinson, California	Oldest preserved steam locomotive of the Union Pacific Railroad.
CA-12	1744		Steam 2-6-0 M-6	1901 built by BLW	Niles Canyon Railway, Sunol, California	The Pacific Locomotive Association purchased and began the restoration to bring No. 1744 back to life on the Niles Canyon Railway.
CA-12.5	Southern Pacific 5623				Niles Canyon Railway, Sunol, California	
CA-13	Canadian Pacific 2839		4-6-4 Royal Hudson	1937 built by MLW	Nethercutt Collection, Sylmar, California	
CA-14	Southern Pacific 1293		Steam 0-6-0 S-14	1924 built by LLW	Dr. Powers Park, Tracy, California; 37.74726°N 121.43672°W	
CA-15	Stockton Terminal and Eastern No. 1		Steam 4-4-0		Static display, Travel Town Museum, Los Angeles, California	ST&E 1
CA-16	Denver & Rio Grande 340 (aka Ghost Town & Calico Railroad 340)		Steam 2-8-0	1881 built	Knott's Berry Farm, Buena Park, California	Originally Denver & Rio Grande #400. Later D&RG 340. Sold in 1952 to Walter Knott, and now in service on the Ghost Town & Calico Railroad at Knott's Berry Farm.
CA-17	Denver & Rio Grande 409 (aka Rio Grande Southern 41, and Ghost Town & Calico Railroad 41)		Steam 2-8-0	1881 built	Knott's Berry Farm, Buena Park, California	Originally Denver & Rio Grande #409. In 1916, became Rio Grande Southern 41. Sold in 1951 to Walter Knott, and now in service on the Ghost Town & Calico Railroad at Knott's Berry Farm.
CO-01	Denver & Rio Grande Railroad No. 278		2-8-0, C-16, narrow-gauge	1882 built. 2009 NRHP-listed	Montrose, CO	formerly was at Cimarron, CO. NRHP-listed in Montrose County
CO-03	Rio Grande 168		Steam "T-12" 4-6-0 narrow-gauge	1883 built 1979 NRHP	9 S. Sierra Madre, Colorado Springs, Colorado	Located in a park in Colorado Springs, or operating on Cumbres and Toltec Scenic Railroad, based out of Antonito, Colorado. One of 12 locomotives built for the D&RG by BCW in 1883 with large 46 in (1,200 mm) drivers, making them suitable for relatively fast passenger service. Operational. Oldest steam locomotive owned by C&TSRR. Restored 2019.
CO-06	Rio Grande 169		Steam "T-12" 4-6-0 narrow-gauge	1883 built 2001 NRHP-listed	Cole Park, Alamosa, CO; 37°28′10.6″N 105°51′43.1″W	Another of 12 locomotives built for the D&RG by BCW in 1883 with large 46 in (1,200 mm) drivers, making them suitable for relatively fast passenger service.
CO-04	Rio Grande 315 or Denver and Rio Grande Western Railroad Locomotive No. 315 or D&RGW 315		Steam "C-18" 2-8-0 narrow-gauge	1895 built 2008 NRHP-listed	Durango, CO	Denver and Rio Grande Western Railroad
CO-07	Denver & Rio Grande Western Railroad No. 683 or Rio Grande 683		Steam coal-burning 2-8-0 "Consolidation"	1890	Colorado Railroad Museum, Golden, CO	Only surviving 4 ft 8 1/2 in (1,435 mm) standard gauge steam locomotive from the Denver & Rio Grande Western Railroad.
CO-08	Chicago, Burlington and Quincy Railroad No. 5629		4-8-4	1940 built	Colorado Railroad Museum, Golden, CO	One of four surviving Burlington Route "Northerns".
CO-09	Rio Grande No. 491		Steam 2-8-2 "Mikado" narrow-gauge	1902 built	Colorado Railroad Museum, Golden, CO	Operational, and currently (in 2022) the largest operating narrow gauge engine in the Western hemisphere.
CO-10	Rio Grande No. 318		2-8-0 narrow-gauge	1896-built	Colorado Railroad Museum, Golden, CO	Sister to Rio Grande 315.
CO-11	Rio Grande No. 346 (aka Denver & Rio Grande RR 406)		Steam 2-8-0 "Consolidation" narrow-gauge	1881 built	Colorado Railroad Museum, Golden, CO	Operational (as of 2022)
CO-12	Manitou and Pikes Peak Cog Railway No. 1		Steam 0-4-2 cog	1890	Colorado Railroad Museum, Golden, CO	Originally named "John Hulbert"; rebuilt as a Vauclain compound and numbered #1 in 1893; operated on the Pikes Peak Cog Railway from 1891 into the 1960s.
CO-13	Rio Grande Southern No. 20		Steam 4-6-0 "Ten Wheeler"	1899 built	Colorado Railroad Museum, Golden, CO	Operational (as of 2022)
CO-14	Denver Leadville & Gunnison No. 191		Steam 2-8-0 "Consolidation" narrow-gauge	1880 built	Colorado Railroad Museum, Golden, CO	The oldest locomotive in the state of Colorado.
CO-15	Denver & Rio Grande Western EMD F9A #5771 & F9B #5762		Diesel		Colorado Railroad Museum, Golden, CO	
CO-16	Denver & Rio Grande Western Davenport 0-4-0 #50		Diesel		Colorado Railroad Museum, Golden, CO	
CO-17	Denver & Rio Grande Western EMD GP30 #3011		Diesel		Colorado Railroad Museum, Golden, CO	
CO-18	Denver & Rio Grande Western EMD SD40T-2 #5401.		Diesel		Colorado Railroad Museum, Golden, CO	Donated to the museum in 2018.
CO-19	West Side Lumber Company #12 (Shay locomotive)		Shay		Colorado Railroad Museum, Golden, CO	
CO-20	West Side Lumber Company #14 (Shay locomotive)		Shay		Colorado Railroad Museum, Golden, CO	
CO-21	Royal Gorge 40		2-8-0	1921 built	Photographed at Colorado Railroad Museum in 2007.	
CO-22	Union Pacific 4455		0-6-0	1920 built	Photographed at Colorado Railroad Museum in 2007.	
CO-23	Big Boy Union Pacific #4005		Steam 4-8-8-4		Forney Transportation Museum, Denver, CO	One of the few remaining examples of the world's largest steam locomotives, a 4-8-8-4 type, of which only 25 were ever built, and eight remain in museums
CO-24	Forney Locomotive, F&CPV 108		0-4-4T	1897 built	Forney Transportation Museum, Denver, CO	A Forney locomotive with number 108.
CO-25	another locomotive at Forney Transportation Museum				Forney Transportation Museum, Denver, CO; 39.77795°N 104.97064°W	Photographed in 2012.
CO-26	Chicago & North Western Railway 444		class R-1 4-6-0 (Alco 38526 of 1906)		Forney Transportation Museum, Denver, CO	Photographed at Forney as of summer 2012
CO-27	Colorado and Southern Railway #9		2-6-0	1884 built	Georgetown Loop Railroad, Georgetown to Silver Plume, CO; 39.69495°N 105.72413°W	Was preserved, used & damaged, now on static display. This engine was originally built as #72 for the Denver, South Park & Pacific RR.
CO-28	CCVNGR Engine No. 1		Steam 0-4-4-0T coal-fired	1902 built	Cripple Creek and Victor Narrow Gauge Railroad	Operational. An Orenstein & Koppel articulated mallet built in 1902.
CO-29	CCVNGR Engine No. 2		Steam 0-4-0T+T coal-fired	1936 built	Cripple Creek and Victor Narrow Gauge Railroad	Operational. Henschel.
CO-30	CCVNGR Engine No. 3		Steam 0-4-0T built in 1927.	1927 built	Cripple Creek and Victor Narrow Gauge Railroad	Operational. H. K. Porter tank.
CO-31	CCVNGR Engine No. 4		Steam 0-4-4-0T	1947 built	Cripple Creek and Victor Narrow Gauge Railroad	Under long term overhaul. W. G. Bagnall.
CO-32	Rio Grande 463		Steam 2-8-2, narrow-gauge	1903 built 1975 NRHP-listed	Cumbres and Toltec Scenic Railroad, CO/NM	Operational
CO-33	C&TSRR No. 484		Steam 2-8-2, narrow-gauge	1925 built	Cumbres and Toltec Scenic Railroad, CO/NM	Operational
CO-34	C&TSRR No. 487		Steam 2-8-2, narrow-gauge	1925 built	Cumbres and Toltec Scenic Railroad, CO/NM	Operational
CO-35	C&TSRR No. 488		Steam 2-8-2, narrow-gauge	1925 built	Cumbres and Toltec Scenic Railroad, CO/NM	Operational
CO-36	C&TSRR No. 489		Steam 2-8-2, narrow-gauge	1925 built	Cumbres and Toltec Scenic Railroad, CO/NM	Operational
CO-37	C&TSRR No. 497		Steam 2-8-2, K-37, narrow-gauge	1902 built	Cumbres and Toltec Scenic Railroad, CO/NM	Operational. Was restored to operating condition for the Durango and Silverton Narrow Gauge Railroad in 1984 and was traded to the C&TSRR in late October 1991 in exchange for class K-36 locomotive 482. Locomotive 497 was later taken out of service in late 2002 and currently sits in storage in the Chama roundhouse awaiting an overhaul.
CO-38	C&TSRR 489		Steam 2-8-2, K-36, narrow-gauge	1925 built	Cumbres and Toltec Scenic Railroad, CO/NM	In 2019 went down for Federal Railroad Administration-mandated inspection and replacement of smokebox. Also under conversion to burn oil instead of coal, with completion expected in 2021.
CO-40	D&RGW No. 315 also operates on Cumbres & Toltec Scenic Railroad		C-18 2-8-0 "Consolidation" narrow-gauge	1895 built	Cumbres and Toltec Scenic Railroad, CO/NM	Owned by the Durango Railroad Historical Society, but on indefinite loan to the C&TSRR. Restoration work on No. 315 was completed in August 2007, and it continues to operate on occasional special excursions on both the D&SNG and the C&TSRR.
CO-41	D&RG Engine 494 or C&TSRR 494		2-8-2, narrow-gauge	1902 built	Cumbres and Toltec Scenic Railroad, CO/NM	Photo from 2016 labelled "D&RG Engine 494" but in Commons category for Cumbres and Toltec.
CO-42	D&RG 495 or C&TSRR 494		2-8-2, K-37, narrow-gauge	1902 built	Cumbres and Toltec Scenic Railroad, CO/NM	
CO-43	a C&TSRR diesel locomotive				Cumbres and Toltec Scenic Railroad, CO/NM	
CO-44	another C&TSRR diesel locomotive				Cumbres and Toltec Scenic Railroad, CO/NM	
CO-45	D&RG 473		Steam 2-8-2 K-28	1923 built	D&SNG, Durango, CO	Operational. Converted from burning coal to burning oil in 2021.
CO-46	D&RG 476		Steam 2-8-2 K-28	1923 built	D&SNG, Durango, CO	Operational as of May 2022; converted to oil.
CO-47	D&RG 478		Steam 2-8-2 K-28	1923 built	D&SNG, Durango, CO	Operational, but taken out of service in 2016; on display at the D&SNG Museum, awaiting a future overhaul.
CO-48	D&RG 480		Steam 2-8-2 K-36	1925 built	D&SNG, Durango, CO	Operational. Restored in 1985, converted to oil in 2021.
CO-49	D&RG 481		Steam 2-8-2 K-36	1925 built	D&SNG, Durango, CO	Operational. Was the first K-36 class to go to Silverton under its own power.
CO-50	D&RGW 482		Steam 2-8-2 K-36	1925 built	D&SNG, Durango, CO	Operational. Restored in 1992. Converted from a coal burner to an oil burner in 2021.
CO-51	D&RGW 486		Steam 2-8-2 K-36	1925 built by BLW	D&SNG, Durango, CO	Operational. Restored in 2000.
CO-52	D&RGW 493		Steam 2-8-2 K-37	1928 built	D&SNG, Durango, CO	Operational. Was on display in Silverton until moved to Durango in 2016 for restoration. Restored to operating condition in 2020. Converted from burning coal to burning oil.
CO-53	D&RGW 498		Steam 2-8-2 K-37	1930 built	D&SNG, Durango, CO	Stored in Durango, serving as a parts source for other locomotives. Tender was sent with K-37 class No. 499 when traded to the Royal Gorge Park in 1999.
CO-54	No. 1		Diesel (B-B) 45-Ton (Center-Cab)	1957 built	D&SNG, Durango, CO	Operational. Nicknamed the "Hotshot".
CO-55	No. 5		Diesel (B-B) 45-Ton (Center-Cab)	1960 built	D&SNG, Durango, CO	Stored in Durango.
CO-56	No. 11		Diesel (B-B) 98-Ton (Center-Cab)	Unknown built date	D&SNG, Durango, CO	Operational. Built at or for U.S. Steel using General Electric parts.
CO-57	No. 101		Diesel (C-C) DL-535E	1969 built	D&SNG, Durango, CO	Operational. (Note: Recently acquired from the White Pass and Yukon Route (WP&Y) in April 2020. Arrived in Durango in late September 2020.)
CO-58	No. 103		Diesel (C-C) DL-535E	1969 built	D&SNG, Durango, CO	Operational. (Note: Recently acquired from the White Pass and Yukon Route in May 2021. Arrived in Durango in September 2021.)
CO-59	No. 106		Diesel (C-C) DL-535E	1969 built	D&SNG, Durango, CO	Operational. (Note: Recently acquired from the White Pass and Yukon Route in May 2021. Arrived in Durango in September 2021.)
CO-60	No. 107		Diesel (C-C) DL-535E	1969	D&SNG, Durango, CO	Operational. (Note: Recently acquired from the White Pass and Yukon Route (WP&Y) in April 2020. Arrived in Durango in late August 2020.)
CO-61	No. 1201		Diesel (B-B) MP2000NG	2018–2020	D&SNG, Durango, CO	Operational. (Note: Acquired from Motive Power and Equipment Solutions (MP&ES) in 2018 in response to the 416 Fire. Arrived in Durango in early November 2020. Rebuilt from an ex-Tri-Rail F40PHL-2. Originally announced to have the number 550, in reference to the highway linking Durango and Silverton.)
CO-62	No. 1202		Diesel (B-B) MP2000NG	2018–2020	D&SNG, Durango, CO	Operational. (Note: Acquired from Motive Power and Equipment Solutions (MP&ES) in 2018 in response to the 416 Fire. Arrived in Durango in late October 2020. Rebuilt from an ex-Tri-Rail F40PHL-2. Originally announced to have the number 416, in recognition of the extraordinary effort that was undertaken by firefighters to fight the 416 Fire.)
CO-63	No. 1203		Diesel (C-C) 80-Ton	1946	D&SNG, Durango, CO	Operational. (Note: Acquired from the Georgetown Loop Railroad in 2017 in trade for GE 92-ton center cab diesel No. 9.)
CO-64	PPCR No. 1		Cog steam 0-4-2T	1890 built by BCW	On display at the Colorado Railroad Museum	Originally built as the "John Hulbert", rebuilt as a Vauclain compound and numbered 1 in 1893.
CO-65	PPCR No. 2		Cog steam 0-4-2T	1890 by BCW	On display in Manitou Springs, Colorado	Originally built as the "Manitou", renamed to "T.F. Richardson" at some point before 1898. Rebuilt as a Vauclain Compound and numbered #2 in 1893.
CO-66	PPCR No. 3		Cog steam 0-4-2T	1890 built by BLW	PPCR, Manitou Springs, CO	Scrapped for parts. Originally built as "Pike's Peak", rebuilt as a Vauclain Compound and numbered #3 in 1893.
CO-67	PPCR No. 4 (1st)		Cog steam 0-4-2T	1892 built by BLW	Wrecked August 31, 1896, scrapped	The smallest engine the railway owned, was known as the "little 4". First engine delivered as a Vauclain Compound, and its superiority over the previous 3 engines resulted in them being sent back to Baldwin to be rebuilt. Broke a side rod and ran away in August 1896.
CO-68	No. 4 (2nd)		Cog steam 0-4-2T	1897 built by BLW	On display at the Grand Canyon Railway, Williams, AZ	Built to replaced wrecked #4. Built to the specifications of the original larger engines. #4 Was sent to the Colorado Railroad Museum after retirement in October 1968. It was then traded for #1 in November 1979.
CO-69	No. 5		Cog steam 0-4-2T	1901 by BLW	On display at The Broadmoor, Colorado Springs, CO	First engine built with an automatic brake. Displayed at the Cog Railway Depot in Manitou for many years before being moved to the Broadmoor Hotel and put on display.
CO-70	No. 8		Cog diesel electric	1939 by GE	Sold to the Garden of the Gods, Colorado Springs, CO	First GE Unit delivered to the railway. It had 3 2 stroke General Motors 71 engines and internal Dynamic brakes. Was retired with the arrival of the Swiss units and robbed of parts to maintain other engines.
CO-71	No. 9		Cog diesel electric	1946 by GE	On display at the Colorado Railroad Museum, Golden, CO	Unit 9 was powered by 2 Cummins NHS diesels as built. Later rebuilt to have twin Cummins 855 Diesels.
CO-72	No. 10		Cog diesel electric	1950 by GE	[Rebuilt as No. 22, so this row should be deleted if there is row for 22]	Rebuilt as No. 22. Unit 10 was powered by 2 Cummins NHS diesels as built. The frame of this unit was the basis for snowplow 22.
CO-73	No. 11		Cog diesel electric	1950 by GE	Sold to the Garden of the Gods, Colorado Springs, CO	Unit 11 was powered by 2 Cummins NHS diesels as built. Later rebuilt with Cummins 855 diesels.
CO-74	No. 12		Cog diesel electric	1955 by Manitou and Pikes Peak railroad shops	Rebuilt as No. 23 PPCR, Manitou Springs, CO	Built by the railroad shops, unit 12 was powered by 2 General Motors 110 diesels. Was built to the same body style as the GE built units. Rebuilt to Unit 23 in 1982.
CO-75	Rio Grande Southern 42 (aka Denver & Rio Grande 420)		Steam 2-8-0	1887 built	D&SNG, Durango, CO	On display in the Durango roundhouse.
CO-76	Denver & Rio Grande 268		Steam 2-8-0	1882 built	Gunnison Pioneer Museum, Gunnison, Colorado	Restored to its appearance in the mid-20th-century.
	Canadian Pacific 1246				Railroad Museum of New England, Thomaston, Connecticut	
FL-01	Florida East Coast Railway Locomotive No. 153		Steam 4-6-2	1922 built by ALC; 1985 NRHP	Miami, FL	
IL-01	New York Central and Hudson River Railroad No. 999		Steam 4-4-0	1893 built	Museum of Science and Industry, Chicago, Illinois	Set world speed record of 112.5 miles per hour (181.1 km/h), claimed to be first over 100 miles per hour (160 km/h).
IN-01	Milwaukee Road 1416 steam locomotive		0-6-0	1908	Evansville Museum Transportation Center, Evansville, Indiana; 37.96436°N 87.57298°W	The locomotive is a 1908 Milwaukee Road I-5 switcher steam engine, believed to be the last of its kind, preserved under a shed roof.
IN-02	New York Chicago and St. Louis Railroad Steam Locomotive No. 765			1944 built	New Haven, IN	
IA-01	Great Northern Railway Steam Locomotive No. 1355		4-6-0 then 4-6-2	1909 built 1924 rebuilt 2004 NRHP	3400 Sioux River Rd., Sioux City, Iowa; 42°31′45″N 96°28′36″W	
KS-01	ATSF 3415		4-6-2	1919 built	Abilene, Kansas	In service on the Abiliene & Smokey Valley RR.
KY-01	L & N Steam Locomotive No. 152			1905 built 1974 NRHP	Kentucky Railway Museum, New Haven, Kentucky; 37°39′25″N 85°35′33″W	
KY-02	Nickel Plate Road Steam Locomotive No. 587			1918 built 1985 NRHP	Ravenna, Kentucky; 37°41′02.2″N 83°51′21.3″W	
LA-01	Southern Pacific 745		Steam 2-8-2 Mk-5	1921 built 1998 NRHP	Louisiana Steam Train Association, Jefferson, LA	Operational. Last surviving locomotive built in Louisiana. Asserted to be the only operating steam locomotive in Louisiana.
MD-01	Chesapeake and Ohio 1309		2-6-6-2	1949 built	Western Maryland Scenic Railroad	Last-built of BLW's Class 1 mainline locomotives, it pulled coal trains. One of few articulated locomotive operating in the United States, on the Western Maryland Scenic Railroad.
MD-02	Western Maryland Railway Steam Locomotive No. 202			1984 NRHP	Hagerstown, MD	
MI-01	Pere Marquette Railway Locomotive No. 1223			2000 NRHP	Grand Haven, MI	
MI-02	Nahma and Northern Railway Locomotive No. 5			2005 NRHP	Nahma Township, MI	
MI-03	Pere Marquette Railway Steam Locomotive No. 1225			2004 NRHP	Owosso, MI	
MN-01	Soo Line Locomotive 2719		4-6-2 "Pacific" type	1923 built by ALCO; 2003 NRHP	On static display, in Duluth, Minnesota	Hauled the Soo Line's last steam-powered train, a June 21, 1959 round-trip excursion between Minneapolis, Minnesota and Ladysmith, Wisconsin. It was then displayed in Eau Claire, Wisconsin until 1996. Then based in Duluth, it was restored and operated in excursion service from 1998 until 2013 when its boiler certificate expired. Today, the locomotive remains on display in Duluth, Minnesota.
MN-02	Soo Line 700		EMD GP30	1963 built by Electro-Motive Diesel	Lake Superior Railroad Museum, Duluth, Minnesota	
MO-01	Southern Pacific 4460		Steam 4-8-4 GS-6	1943 built by LLW	Static display, National Museum of Transportation, St. Louis, Missouri	Nicknamed "Black Daylight" and "War Baby", and also known as the "Forgotten Daylight"
NE-01	Chicago, Burlington & Quincy Steam Locomotive No. 710			1997 NRHP	Lincoln, NE	
NV-01	Virginia and Truckee Railway Locomotive No. 27			2004 NRHP	Carson City, NV	
NV-02	Nevada-California-Oregon Railway Locomotive House and Machine Shop			1983 NRHP	Reno, NV	
NV-03	Southern Pacific 8		4-6-0 narrow-gauge	1907 built by BLW	Lillard Park, Sparks, Nevada	
NJ-01	United States Army Steam Locomotive No. 4039			2002 NRHP	Hanover Township, NJ	
NJ-02	New York, Susquehanna & Western Railroad ALCO Type S-2 Locomotive No. 206			2009 NRHP	Maywood, NJ	
NM-01	ATSF Locomotive No. 2926			1944 built 2007 NRHP	Albuquerque, NM	
NM-02	D&RGW 463		2-8-2	1903 built 1975 NRHP	Chama; 36°54′10.4″N 106°34′40.7″W	Denver and Rio Grande Western Railroad
NC-01	East Tennessee & Western North Carolina Railroad Locomotive No. 12			1917 built by BLW; 1992 NRHP-listed	Blowing Rock, North Carolina	
	Canadian Pacific 1278				Age of Steam Roundhouse, Sugarcreek, Ohio	
	Canadian Pacific 1293				Age of Steam Roundhouse, Sugarcreek, Ohio	
OR-01	McCloud River Railway No. 25					
OR-02	Southern Pacific 4449		Steam 4-8-4 GS-4		Oregon Rail Heritage Center, Portland, Oregon	Operational.
PA-01	Pennsylvania Railroad 4859		Electric, GG1	2004 NRHP	Harrisburg Transportation Center, Harrisburg, Pennsylvania	
PA-02	Pennsylvania Railroad 1187		Steam, 2-8-0 Consolidation	1979 NRHP	Railroad Museum of Pennsylvania, Strasburg, Pennsylvania	
PA-03	Pennsylvania Railroad 2846		Steam, 2-8-0 Consolidation	1979 NRHP	Railroad Museum of Pennsylvania, Strasburg, Pennsylvania	
PA-04	Pennsylvania Railroad 7688		Steam, 2-8-0 Consolidation	1979 NRHP	Railroad Museum of Pennsylvania, Strasburg, Pennsylvania	
PA-05	Pennsylvania Railroad 3936 and 3937		Electric, DD1	1979 NRHP	Railroad Museum of Pennsylvania, Strasburg, Pennsylvania	
PA-06	Pennsylvania Railroad 4935		Electric, GG1		Railroad Museum of Pennsylvania, Strasburg, Pennsylvania	
PA-07	Pennsylvania Railroad 5741		Steam, 4-6-0 Ten Wheeler	1979 NRHP	Railroad Museum of Pennsylvania, Strasburg, Pennsylvania	
PA-08	Pennsylvania Railroad 6755		Steam, 4-8-2 Mountain	2001 NRHP	Railroad Museum of Pennsylvania, Strasburg, Pennsylvania	
PA-09	Pennsylvania Railroad 520		Steam, 2-8-2 Mikado	1979 NRHP	Railroad Museum of Pennsylvania, Strasburg, Pennsylvania	
PA-10	Pennsylvania Railroad 1223		Steam, 4-4-0 American	1979 NRHP	Railroad Museum of Pennsylvania, Strasburg, Pennsylvania	
PA-11	Pennsylvania Railroad 3750		Steam, 4-6-2 Pacific	1979 NRHP	Railroad Museum of Pennsylvania, Strasburg, Pennsylvania	
PA	Pennsylvania Railroad 460		Steam, 4-4-2 Atlantic	1979 NRHP	Railroad Museum of Pennsylvania, Strasburg, Pennsylvania	
PA-12	Pennsylvania Railroad 7002		Steam 4-4-2 Atlantic	1979 NRHP	Railroad Museum of Pennsylvania, Strasburg, Pennsylvania	
PA-	Canadian Pacific 2317				Static display, Steamtown National Historic Site, Pennsylvania	
SC-01	Hampton & Branchville 44		4-6-0 ten wheeler steam locomotive	1927 built	South Carolina Railroad Museum, South Carolina; 34.34034°N 81.07946°W	
OR-01	Polson Logging Co. 2		2-8-2 Mikado	Oregon Coast Scenic Railroad	A locomotive of Polson Logging Company or Polson Logging Co., preserved.	
TN-01	Wilmington and Western 58			1907 built	Wilmington and Western / Wilmington & Western RR	
TN-02	Cherokee Brick & Tile 1		2-4-2	1920 built	Cowan Railroad Museum, Cowan, Tennessee	
TN-03	Mikado Locomotive No. 4501			1979 NRHP	Chattanooga, Tennessee	
TX-01	Atchison, Topeka and Santa Fe Railway Company Depot and Locomotive No. 5000				Amarillo, Texas	
TX-02	EP&SW 1		Steam 4-4-0	1857 built	Static display, Railroad and Transportation Museum of El Paso, El Paso, Texas	Wood-burning. Only surviving locomotive of Breese, Kneeland, and Company of New Jersey
TX-03	Texas & Pacific Steam Locomotive No. 610			1977 NRHP	Fort Worth, Texas	
TX-04	No. 771		Steam 2-8-2 Mk-5		Static display, Grapevine Vintage Railroad, Grapevine, Texas	[Not mentioned by this name at Grapevine Vintage Railroad, may be 2199 or another, per List of preserved Southern Pacific Railroad rolling stock.]
TX-05	Grapevine Vintage Railroad 2199 ("Vinny")		Diesel EMD GP7u	1953 built	Operational, Grapevine Vintage Railroad, Grapevine, Texas	Originally owned by the Atchison, Topeka, and Santa Fe Railroad, it was purchased by the Grapevine Vintage Railroad in 2005. Vinny is the most used locomotive on the line while 2248 is down for repair.
TX-06	Grapevine Vintage Railroad 2248 ("Puffy")	The "Puffy" locomotive at the Stockyards displaying the old Tarantula branding		1896 built by Cooke Locomotive Works	Grapevine Vintage Railroad, Grapevine, Texas	Originally owned by the Southern Pacific Railroad for mixed passenger and freight use in California. Later in its life, it was converted into a fire train, and eventually ended up as a ceremonial engine in a private collection. Although at one point Walt Disney was eyeing it for a project that never came to be, it ended up in the hands of the Texas State Railroad in 1976. In 1990, #2248 was purchased by the FWWR and restored to operational condition in 1991. Since early 2016, the 2248 has been out of service. Grapevine expects to see the locomotive return to steam by 2023.
TX-07	Southern Pacific 786		Steam 2-8-2 Mk-5	1916 built by Brooks Locomotive Works	Undergoing restoration, Austin Steam Train Association, Austin, Texas	
TX-08	Southern Pacific 794		Steam 2-8-2 Mk-5		Static display, Sunset Station, San Antonio, Texas	
UT-01	Texas and New Orleans 146		Steam 0-6-0 S-13		Ogden, Utah	Of the T&NO, per Per List of preserved Southern Pacific Railroad rolling stock
UT-02	Grant Steam Locomotive No. 223 (or D&RGW 223)	D&RGW 223 Denver & Rio Grande Railroad #223, ca. 1900, Cimarron, Colorado. Friends of the Cumbres & Toltec Scenic Railroad collection.	2-8-0	1881 built 1979 NRHP	Salt Lake City, UT or Ogden; 41°13′19.9″N 111°58′47.6″W	Denver and Rio Grande Western Railroad
VA-01	Richmond Locomotive and Machine Works			2007 NRHP	Richmond, Virginia	
VT-01	Phenix Marble Company 1				Passumpsic Railroad, Passumpsic, Vermont	A locomotive of Phenix Marble Company, preserved.
VT-02	Lowville and Beaver River Railroad 8		Shay	1918 built Shay locomotive	Steamtown USA, Vermont (see here)	A locomotive of the Lowville and Beaver River Railroad, preserved. YouTube "Lowville and Beaver River Shay #8 at Steamtown"
WA-01	Hillcrest Lumber Company 10		3-truck Climax	1928	Mt. Rainier Scenic Railroad, Washington	Climax Locomotive Works
WA-02	Simpson Logging Company Locomotive No. 7		Shay locomotive	1924 built 2004 NRHP	Shelton, Washington	
WI-01	Steam Locomotive No. 1385	C&NW 1385	4-6-0	1907 built 2000 NRHP	North Freedom, Wisconsin; 43°27′31″N 89°52′29″W	
WV-01	Chesapeake and Ohio 1308		2-6-6-2	1949 built by BLW; 2003 NRHP	1401 Memorial Blvd, Huntington, West Virginia; 38°24′18.5″N 82°28′38″W	One of the last Class 1 mainline locomotives built by Baldwin Locomotive Works, closing out more than 100 years of production, a total of more than 70,000 locomotives. [Was in WV, but may now be in MD.]
WV-02	Elk River Coal and Lumber Company No. 10	Elk River Coal and Lumber Company No. 10	2-8-2	1924 built 2006 NRHP	Huntington, West Virginia; 38°25′25.1″N 82°26′27.1″W	Elk River Coal and Lumber Company
WV-03	Chesapeake and Ohio 2755		2-8-4	1947-built	Chief Logan State Park, Logan County, West Virginia; 37°53′34″N 82°0′34″W	Built by Lima Locomotive Works; pulled coal trains until 1956.
Unk-99	DV&S 50		GE 45-ton switcher	1954 built 2001 NRHP	Location unknown	Delta Valley and Southern Railway

== Others at museums and heritage railways ==
There are many preserved locomotives in the United States which are not individually listed above. Numerous ones are preserved at railway museums and heritage railways, (Note: See Category:Railroad museums in the United States and Category:Heritage railroads in the United States.) These include:

=== California ===
- A number at Niles Canyon Railway

=== Colorado ===
- A number at Colorado Railroad Museum
- A number at Cripple Creek and Victor Narrow Gauge Railroad
- A number at Cumbres and Toltec Scenic Railroad
- None at Durango and Silverton Narrow Gauge Railroad beyond those listed above (Note: DSNG has 19 per Durango and Silverton Narrow Gauge Railroad#D&SNG engines vs. 19 tabulated above)
- A number at Fort Collins Municipal Railway
- A number at Georgetown Loop Railroad
- A number at Pikes Peak Cog Railway
- A number at Rio Grande Scenic Railroad
- A number at Royal Gorge Route Railroad

=== Pennsylvania ===
- 12 at East Broad Top Railroad, a narrow gauge railway headquartered in Rockhill Furnace, Pennsylvania, which has six preserved Mikado locomotives, all built by Baldwin Locomotive Works, and six others. The railroad operated from 1871 to 1956. It operated as a heritage railroad from 1960 until 2011, and was reopened in 2021 as a tourist attraction. These locomotives include:
  - East Broad Top #12 (1911), its oldest, the railroad's first Mikado-class locomotive, and
  - East Broad Top #18 (1923), its newest, a model BLW 12-34 1/4-E, which used Southern valve gear and had boilers equipped with superheaters.

==== Washington ====
- More than 3 steam locomotives (vs just one listed above) and multiple diesels at Mt. Rainier Scenic Railway and its related museum.

== See also ==
- List of preserved locomotives in Canada
- List of locomotives (includes preserved locomotives in the United Kingdom and elsewhere)
