= Steam locomotive 18 =

Steam locomotive 18 may refer to:

- Arcade and Attica 18, a 2-8-0 built in 1920, currently undergoing an overhaul at the Arcade and Attica Railroad in Attica, New York.
- Lake Superior and Ishpeming 18, a 2-8-0 built in 1910, currently undergoing an overhaul at the Colebrookdale Railroad in Pottstown, Pennsylvania.
- McCloud Railway 18, a 2-8-2 built in 1914, currently operational at the Virginia and Truckee Railroad in Virginia City, Nevada.
- Southern Pacific 18, a narrow gauge 4-6-0 built in 1911, currently operational at the Eastern California Museum in Independence, California.
