= Ghost Town & Calico Railroad =

Attraction at Knott's Berry Farm

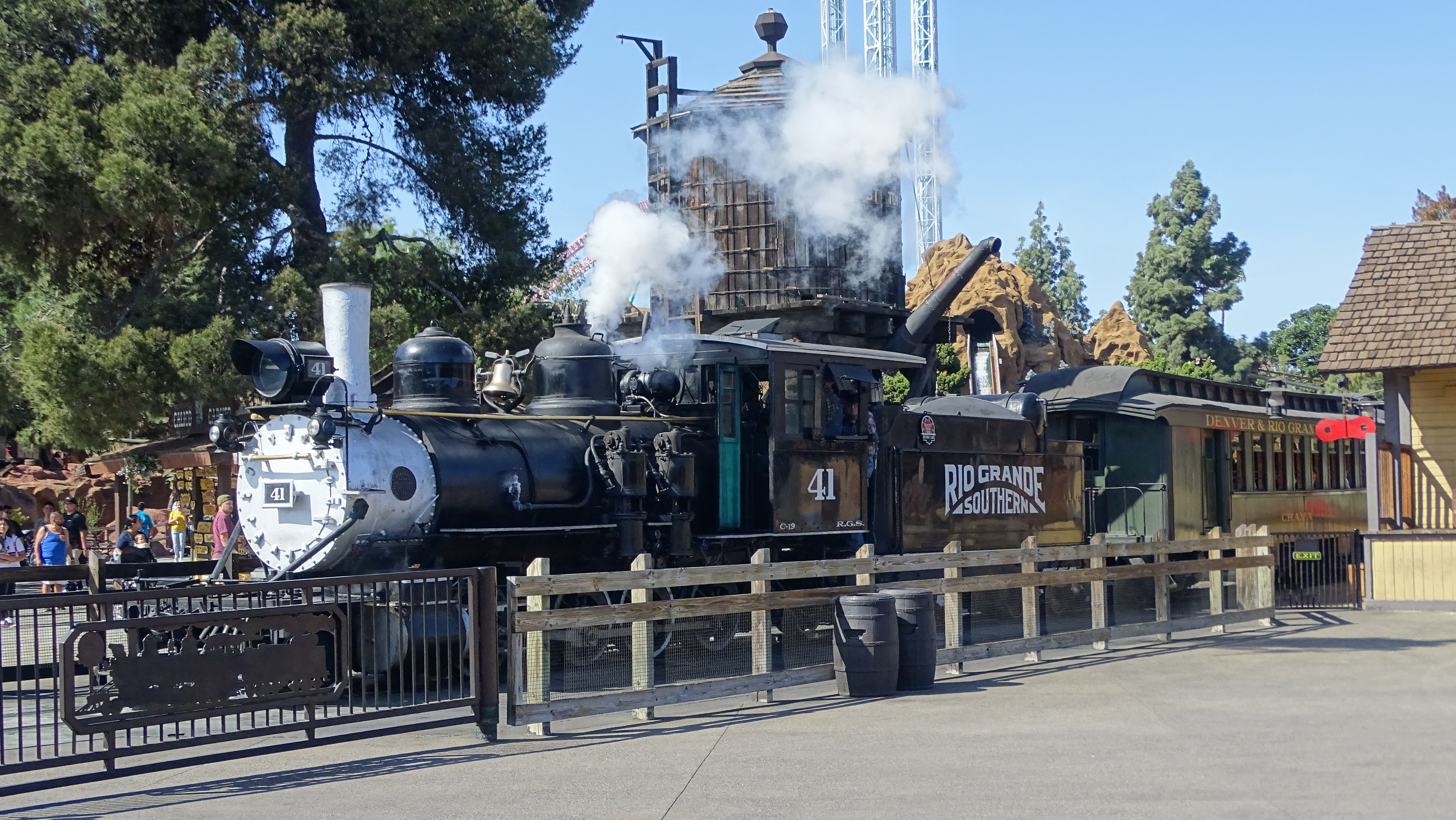
- Rio Grande Southern #41 at Ghost Town Station, 2018.

Knott's Berry Farm
- Coordinates: 33.8443593°N 118.0029427°W (Ghost Town Station)
- Status: Operating
- Opening date: January 12, 1952

Ride statistics
- Attraction type: Heritage railroad
- Manufacturer: Baldwin Locomotive Works
- Vehicle type: Train
- Vehicles: 2 Steam Locomotives; 1 "Galloping Goose" railcar; 1 Combine car; 1 Converted gondola car, now an excursion car; 1 Converted stock car, now an excursion car; 1 Business car; 1 Former Observation/Sleeper car, now in a open coach seating arrangement; 1 Caboose
- Duration: 9-10 minutes
- Track gauge: 3 ft (914 mm)
- Wheelchair accessible

The Ghost Town & Calico Railway is a 3 ft (914 mm) narrow-gauge heritage railroad and amusement park attraction within Knott's Berry Farm, an amusement park located in Buena Park, California.

== Origin ==
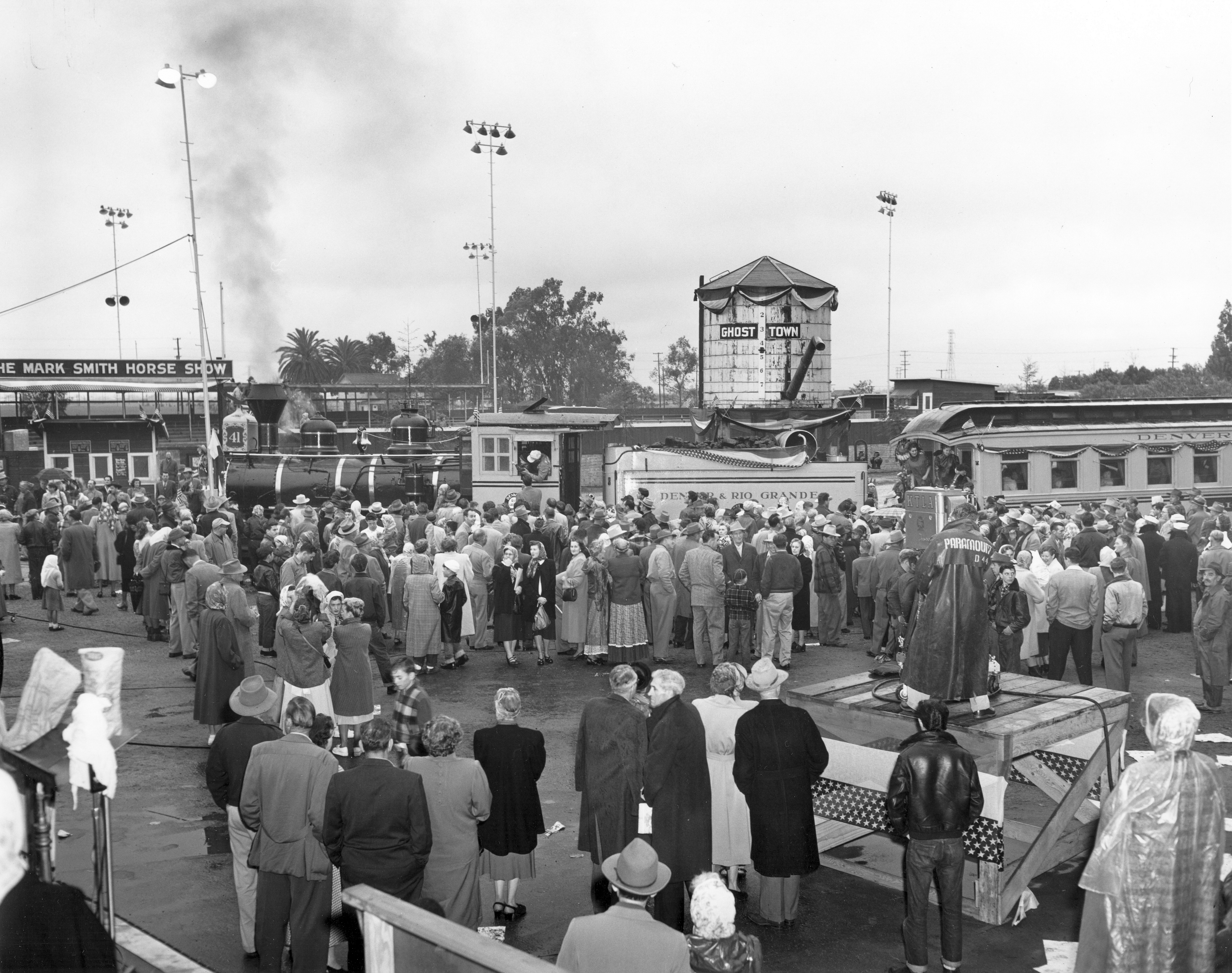
Grand Opening of the Ghost Town & Calico Railway in 1952.

Walter Knott began grading and laying a 3 ft (914 mm) narrow gauge railroad at his Knotts Berry Farm in 1951. He had acquired a collection of vintage rolling stock and other railroad equipment, and wanted to create a railroad experience to run it on. Service started that November, and the railroad formally opened on January 12, 1952.

The engines and most of the cars came from the Denver & Rio Grande Western Railroad and the Rio Grande Southern Railroad.

The D&RG painted a narrow-gauge engine and a few narrow-gauge cars, in a color called Rio Grande Gold, for the Chicago Railroad Fair of 1949. The color was so popular that the company painted the equipment for “The Silverton” (which ran between Durango and Silverton, Colorado) the same color in 1950. The GT&C rolling stock was painted this color when it commenced operations in 1952. The engine was fitted with a diamond stack (that was the wrong shaped diamond) and an overly gaudy paint scheme.

In an effort to make it more authentic, the train has since been restored to its appearance in the 1940s. So, for example, the engines now have a boiler-tube pilot and straight stack. The passenger cars are painted in Pullman Green (which was mandated by the government when it took over the railroads during World War I).

However, the engines were built in 1881, and the cars are from that time period also. And, Walter Knott’s objective in creating Ghost Town was to create an Old West town of the 1800s, not the 1940s.

The engines, which were coal-burners, originally had diamond stacks (to catch the coal cinders), a wooden pilot, and a sand dome that was a bit more ornate (see accompanying photos). The passenger cars have been modified slightly over the years, but they largely retain their original appearance, except for the paint scheme. They were originally painted in Passenger Car Red, rather than Pullman Green.

== Locomotives ==
The roster includes two C-19 2-8-0 "Consolidation" type steam locomotives built by Baldwin Locomotive Works for the Denver & Rio Grande in 1881. When retired from service in Colorado, they were D&RGW No. 340 Green River (formerly D&RG #400, named Gold Nugget No. 40 for many years on the GT&C) from the Denver & Rio Grande Western and RGS No. 41 Red Cliff (recently renamed Walter K at the 60th anniversary ceremony January 12, 2012) from the Rio Grande Southern. D&RGW No. 340 was rebuilt in 2016 and is in use, alternating service with RGS No. 41.

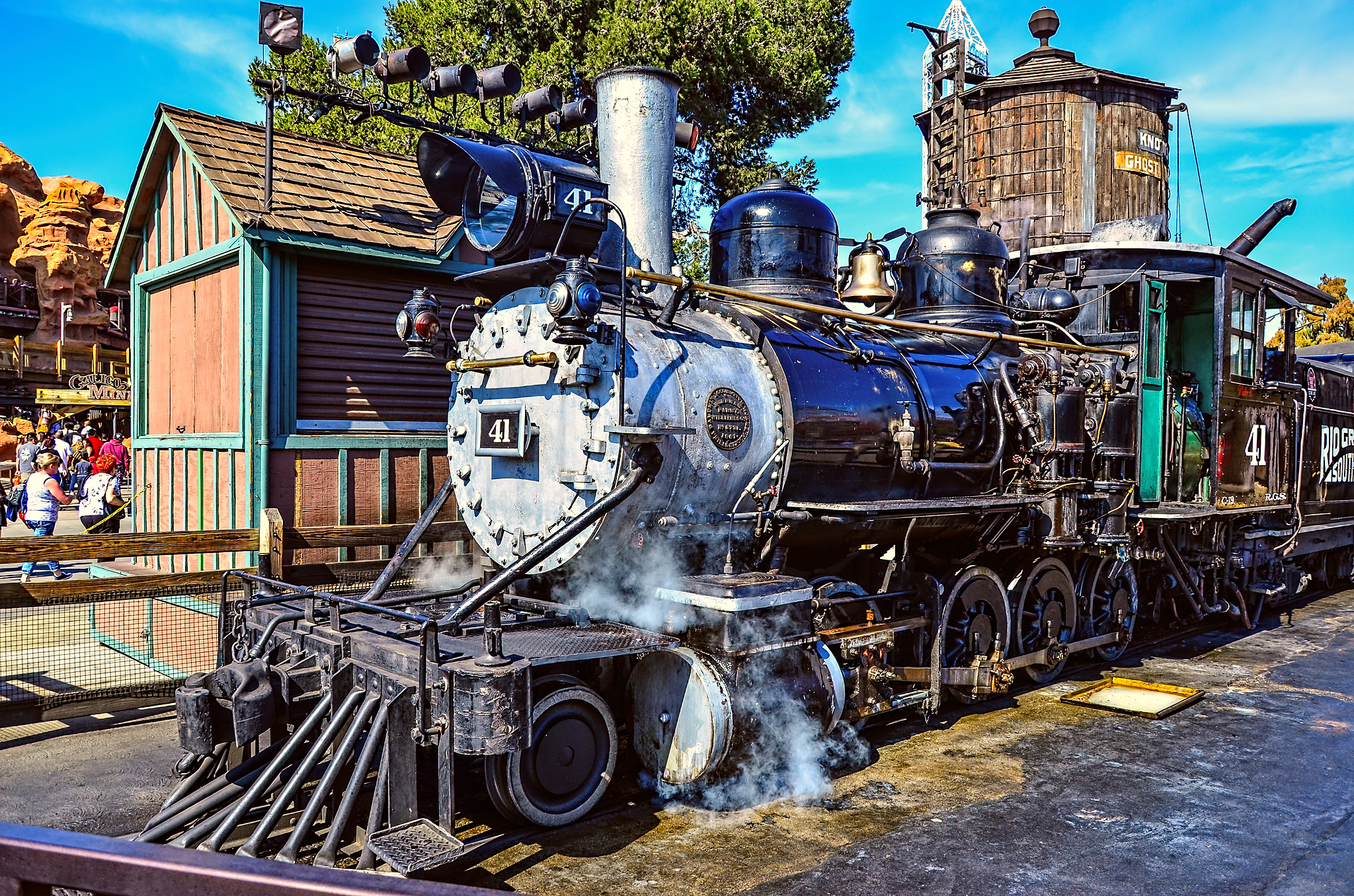
GT&C 41, restored to its 1940s appearance (with a straight stack, boiler-tube pilot and plain sand dome).

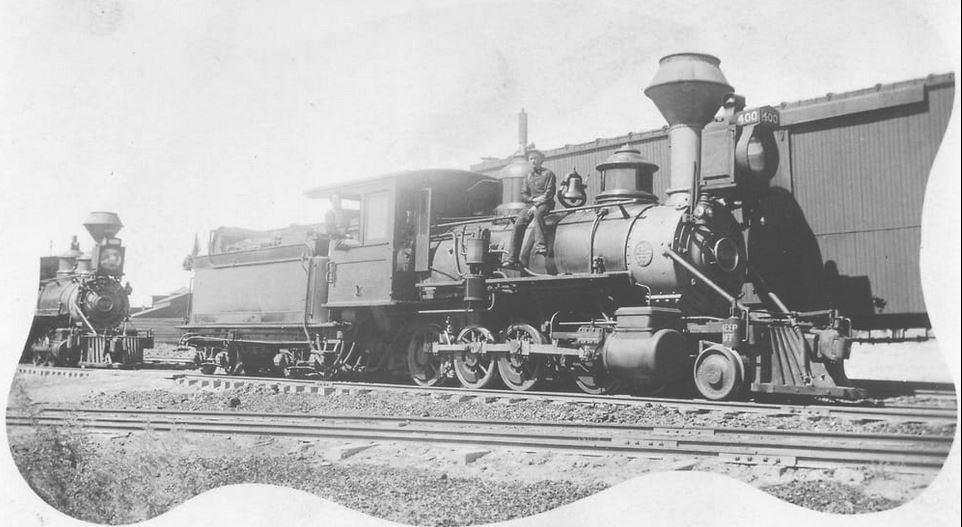
GT&C engine #340 (GT&C 340 was originally D&RG 400) as it appeared in the late 1800s (with a diamond stack, wooden pilot, box headlight and more elaborate sand dome). It probably had decorative trim on both the sand dome and the steam dome originally.

"Galloping Goose" motor rail buses kept the Rio Grande Southern Railroad viable from the 1930s by carrying mail. Their last use was to scrap their own line in 1953. Knott purchased the RGS Motor #3, which is run on the GT&C during the off-season – when ridership is too insufficient to justify hostling a steam locomotive. The Galloping Goose was constructed from a Pierce-Arrow limousine frame, engine, radiator, cowling and body with a four-wheel truck at the front and putting flanged wheels on the rear axle. Later a bogie truck replaced the rear axle, linked to the front truck by a chain drive. A RGS shop-built freight box (converted with trolley seats for passenger service in 1950) articulates on the kingpin over the chain driven center truck. The wooden limousine body was replaced after World War II with a 1939 Wayne military-surplus bus body with both left and right doors. The Pierce-Arrow gasoline engine has been replaced, first with a war-surplus GMC gasoline engine at the RGS, then at Knott's with a war-surplus 6 cylinder in-line Diamond-Reo gasoline engine. In 1997 the engine was replaced once more with a Cummins Diesel engine supported with an I-beam frame extension salvaged from the demolished Windjammer Surf Racers roller coaster.

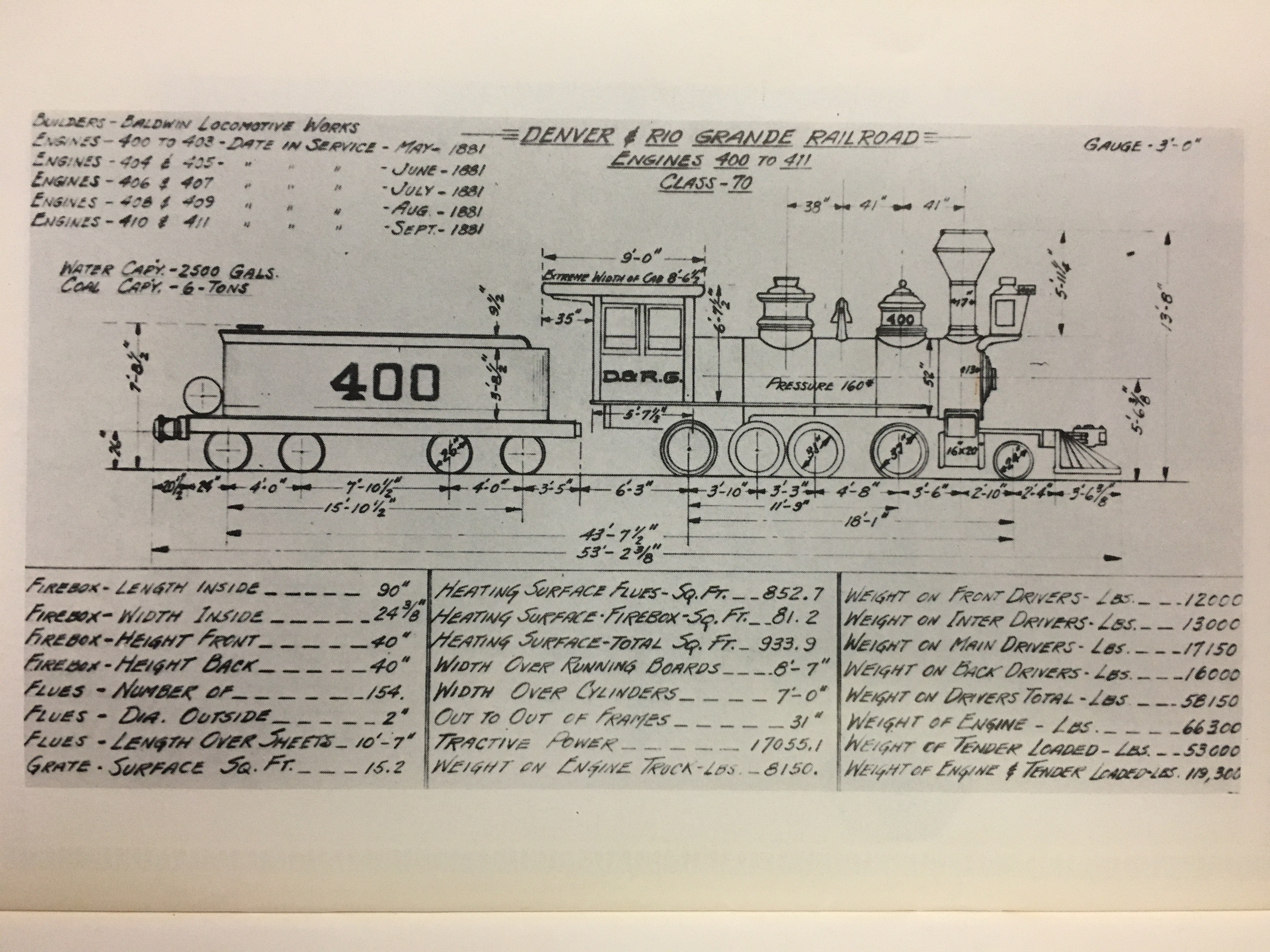
Denver & Rio Grande Railroad Class 70 (C-19) Engines (numbers 400-411) as they were configured in the 1800s. Both of the Ghost Town & Calico RR engines are Class 70 (C-19) engines.

In late 1973, the park received ex-D&RGW K-27 #464, a Mikado 2-8-2 locomotive. However, due to clearance issues, in 1981, Knott's donated the locomotive to the Huckleberry Railroad in Flint, Michigan.

Around 2010, Knotts Berry Farm became the home to an H.K. Porter 0-4-0ST tank locomotive "Jennie K.", formerly used on the Cedar Point and Lake Erie Railroad. The planned restoration of this locomotive did not happen and it was sold in 2017 to Garner Holt of Garner Holt Productions, who is planning to restore it to operating condition.

== Rolling stock ==
=== Revenue ===
When the route opened on January 12, 1952, for passenger service, the locomotives would haul several yellow vintage closed-vestibule wooden passenger coaches led by a No. 103 parlor car Chama which was converted at Knott's in 1954 to combination baggage/coach Calico with arrows simulating an Indian attack embedded near the baggage door. The arrows have since been removed and the cars have been painted in heritage period Pullman-green livery of D&RGW. The consist also includes a gondola (converted from a flat car for open-air passenger seating), and a stock car which was converted from a gondola, fitted with side benches and a wheelchair lift. Rio Grande Southern 0402 is the only caboose on the railroad and is used today.

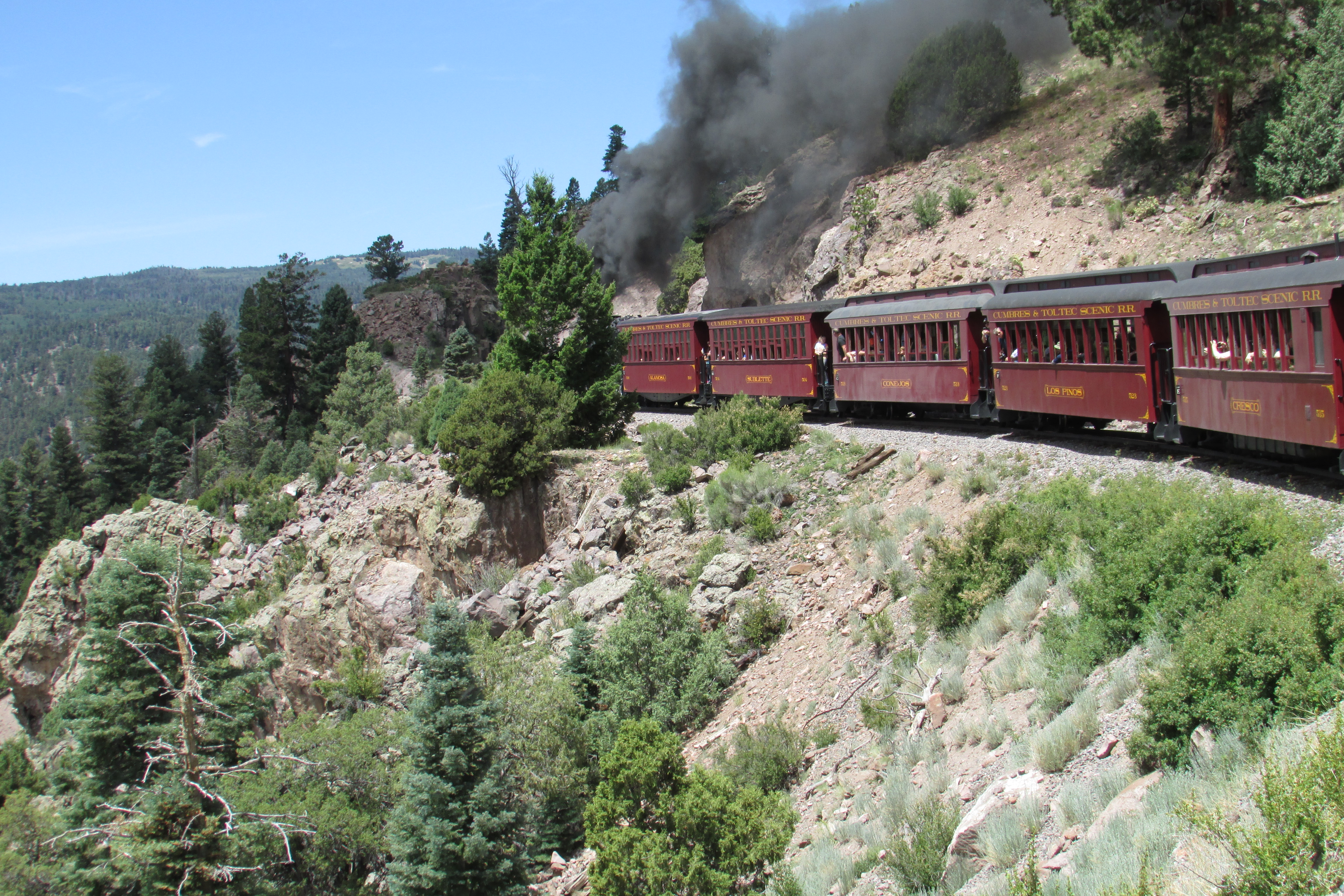
These cars on the Cumbres & Toltec Scenic Railroad are painted in the Passenger Car Red color that the GT&C cars had when they were originally built in the 1800s.

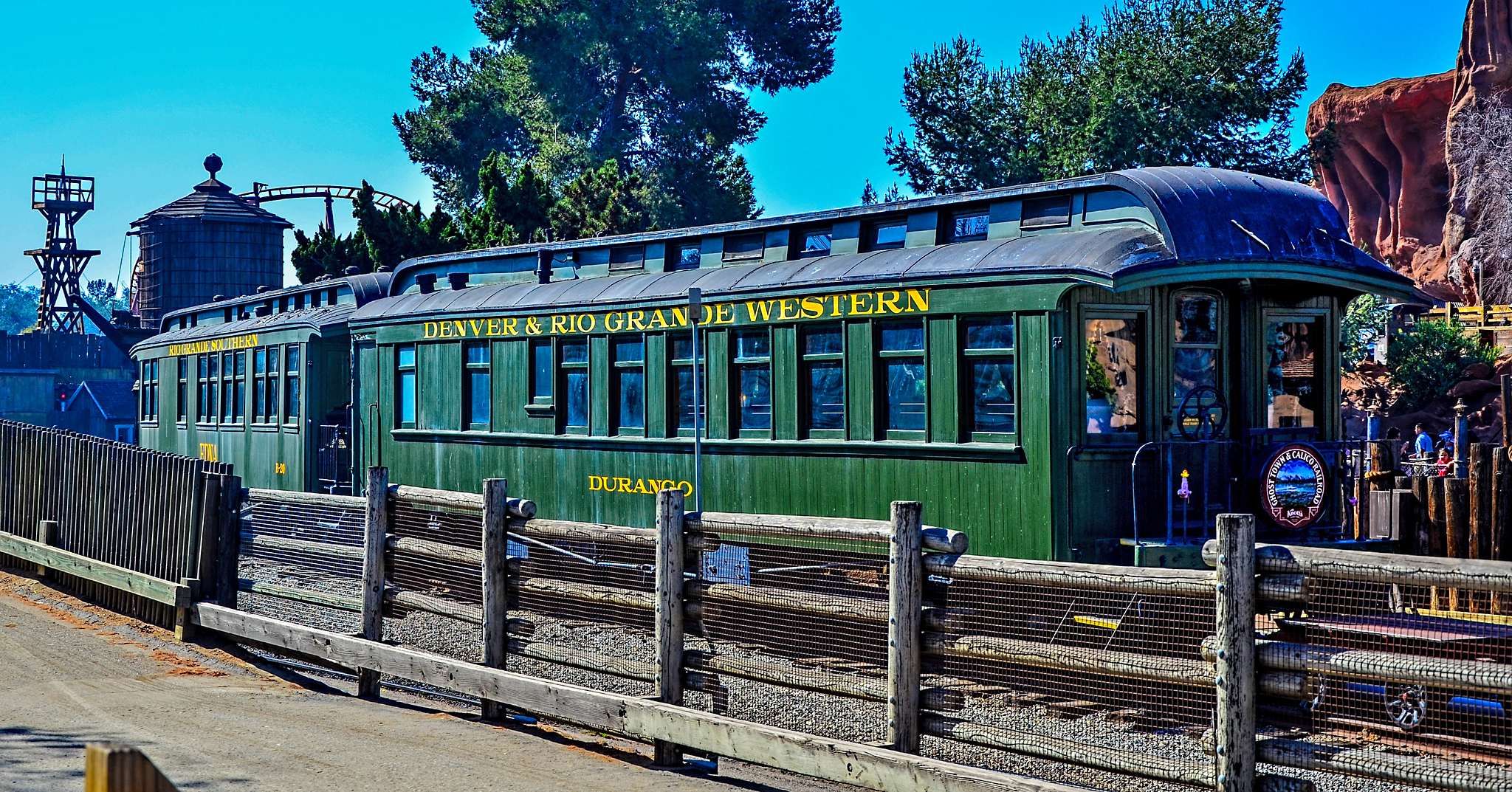
These cars on the GT&C today are painted in the Pullman Green color scheme of the 1940s.

=== Display ===
The parlor car Durango restored in 2011, the Silverton observation sleeper and the No. B-20 Edna were held with the short way car "bobber" caboose and a wooden box car D&RGW No. 3350, on sidings during normal operation. Nowadays the Silverton has been converted to revenue service as a chair coach, and the caboose serves to embark bandits while in motion.

The Business car B-20 Edna (formerly San Juan) was built for use by the Rio Grande Southern president Otto Mears on sidings and spurs as a portable office and temporary home while making track orders. She is fitted with

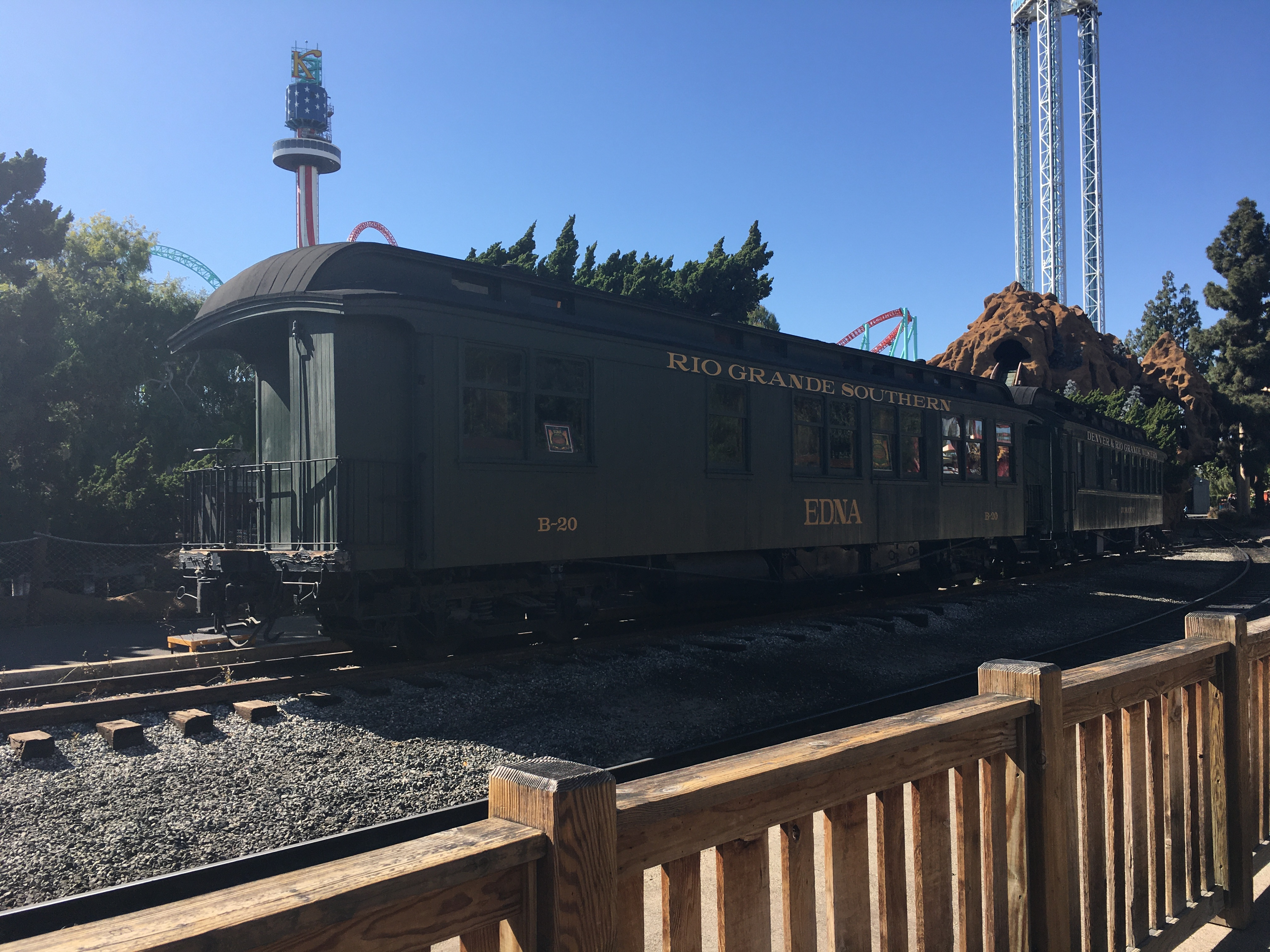
The GT&C business car Edna was originally the traveling office and living quarters of Otto Mears, the first president of the Rio Grande Southern Railroad, who named it the San Juan in 1890. However, three years later, the RGS went into receivership in the silver panic of 1893. Edward Turner Jeffery, the president of the Denver & Rio Grande Railroad (which held a large block of RGS bonds) became the receiver, and later president of the RGS. In 1899, the car was named for his daughter, Edna. Jeffery served as president of the D&RG, the RGS, and later, the Western Pacific Railroad concurrently. The Edna is one of only a small handful of narrow-gauge business cars in the United States still in existence.

- An external pantry mounted to the open vestibule and equipped with overhead ice hopper
- galley (kitchen)
  - a coal hopper
  - water tank
  - heating-plant/boiler/stove/oven/warming-tray combination appliance
- multi-use crew dormitory
- lavatory commode with dry bin toilet
- stateroom with large bed, closet, chest of drawers
- a large multipurpose open area convertible to
  - office/day-use
  - sleeping bunks
  - meal service
  - et cetera
- conductor's desk near the end window and speedometer

Track inspection as well as observation is facilitated by the open vestibule and enlarged end windows. These were deluxe temporary accommodations compared to a caboose, but it was far less opulent than private varnish of its day, which pales by comparison to the amenities offered aboard today's motor homes and recreational vehicles such as a shower or microwave oven.

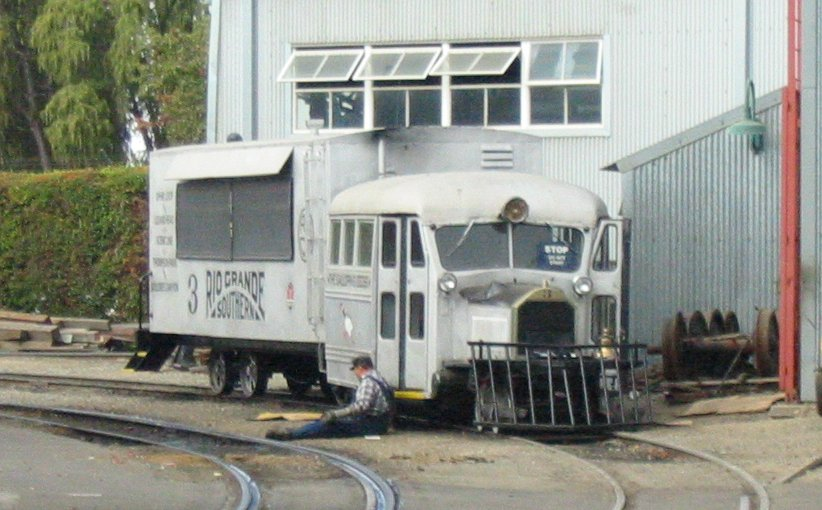
Galloping Goose #3

== See also ==
- Calico, CA
- Calico & Odessa Railroad
- Cumbres and Toltec Scenic Railroad
- Durango and Silverton Narrow Gauge Railroad
- List of heritage railroads in the United States
- Rail transport in Walt Disney Parks and Resorts
