= Passumpsic Railroad =

Railroad in Vermont

Coordinates: 44.3921°N 72.0344°W

The Passumpsic Railroad was located in Barnet, Vermont. The railroad had the only operable steam locomotive in Vermont. Their steam engine was a two-truck Heisler that ran on the Phenix Marble Company.

The Passumpsic Railroad was owned by Marvin Kendall and was located along route 5 south of St. Johnsbury.

The railroad had or has the locomotive named Phenix Marble Company 1.

== See also ==
List of preserved locomotives in the United States
