= Southern Pacific 9 =

Preserved Narrow-gauge 4-6-0 steam locomotive

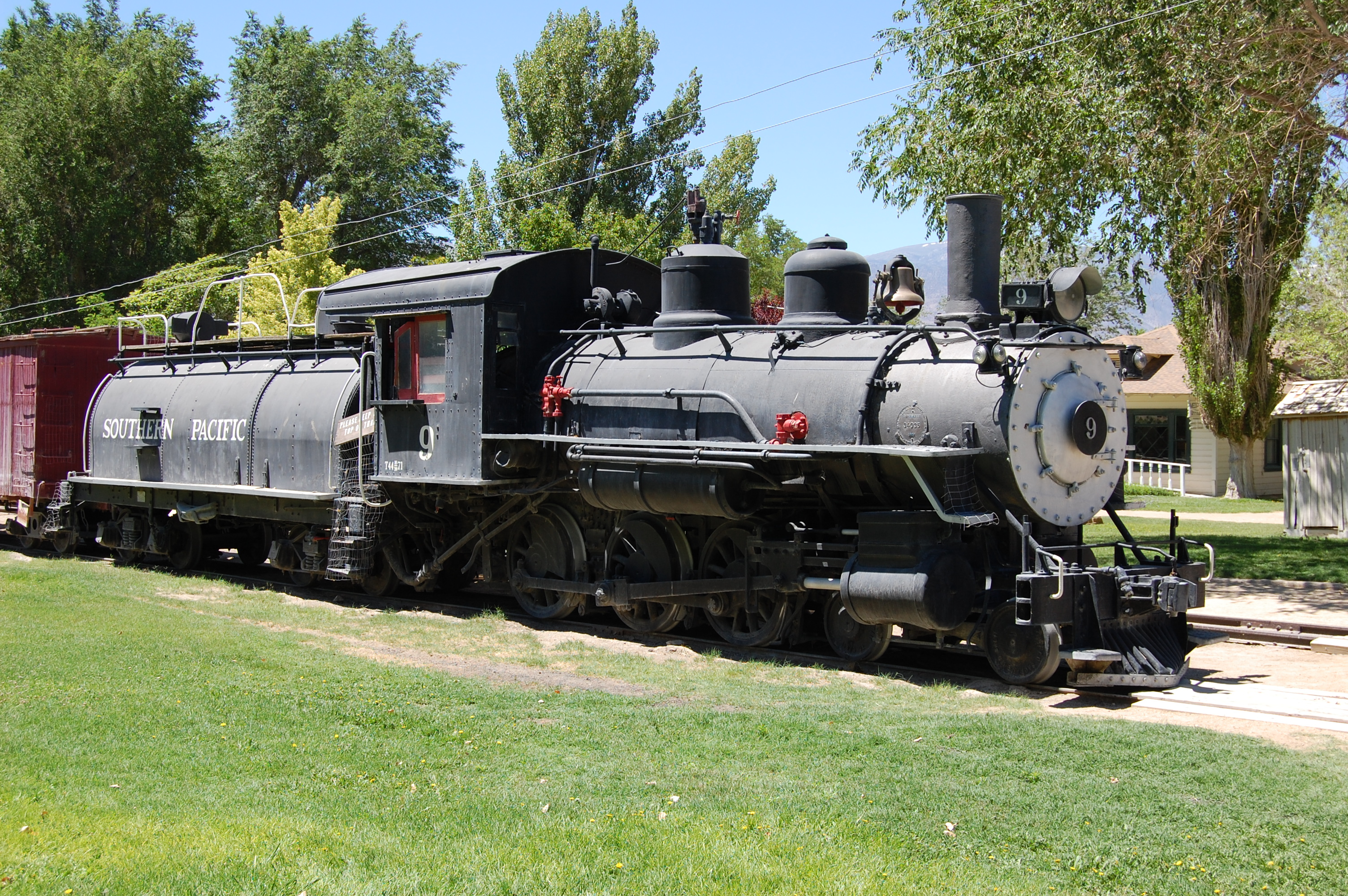
- No. 9 on display at Laws Railroad Museum, Bishop California.
Type and origin
- Power type: Steam
- Builder: Baldwin Locomotive Works
- Serial number: 34035
- Model: 10-26 D 258
- Build date: November 1909
Specifications
- Configuration
  - Whyte: 4-6-0
  - UIC: 2′C
- Gauge: 3 ft (914 mm)
- Driver dia.: 44 in (1.118 m)
- Loco weight: 88,000 pounds (40 t)
- Fuel type: Oil
- Boiler pressure: 180 lbf/in^{2} (1.24 MPa)
- Cylinders: Two, outside
- Cylinder size: 16 in × 20 in (406 mm × 508 mm)
- Valve gear: Stephenson
- Valve type: Piston valves
- Loco brake: Air
- Train brakes: Air
- Couplers: Knuckle
Performance figures
- Tractive effort: 17,800 lbf (79.18 kN)
Career
- Operators: Nevada–California–Oregon Railway; Southern Pacific Company
- Numbers: SP 9
- Retired: 1960
- Current owner: Laws Railroad Museum
- Disposition: On static display

Southern Pacific 9 is a 4-6-0 "Ten-Wheeler" narrow gauge type steam locomotive, built in November 1909 by the Baldwin Locomotive Works (BLW).

It was originally built for the Nevada–California–Oregon Railway (NCOR) and was sold to Southern Pacific (SP) in the late 1920s. The engine worked the rest of its career on the SP narrow gauge, except a brief season in 1953 when the locomotive was briefly loaned to the Plaster City railroad operated by the United States Gypsum Company. The locomotive, along with sisters #8 and #18, were nicknamed "The Desert Princess" for riding along the western and eastern deserts of Nevada and California.

In 1954, there was a plan to purchase a new narrow gauge diesel from GE as SP #1, to replace numbers #9, #8 and #18. Whilst #8 and #18 were sold off, #9 was kept on as a standby locomotive to support diesel locomotive #1 in case of a breakdown.

The engine and the two others, #8 and #18, survived into preservation. Southern Pacific #9 is now on display at the Laws Railroad Museum in Laws, California.

The engine was also used in the 1948 film 3 Godfathers, starring John Wayne, Pedro Armendáriz, and Harry Carey Jr.; as well as cameoing the 1954 - 1957 TV western series Annie Oakley, starring Gail Davis.

== See also ==
- Southern Pacific 8
- Southern Pacific 18
