= Southern Pacific 745 =

Preserved SP MK-5 class 2-8-2 locomotive

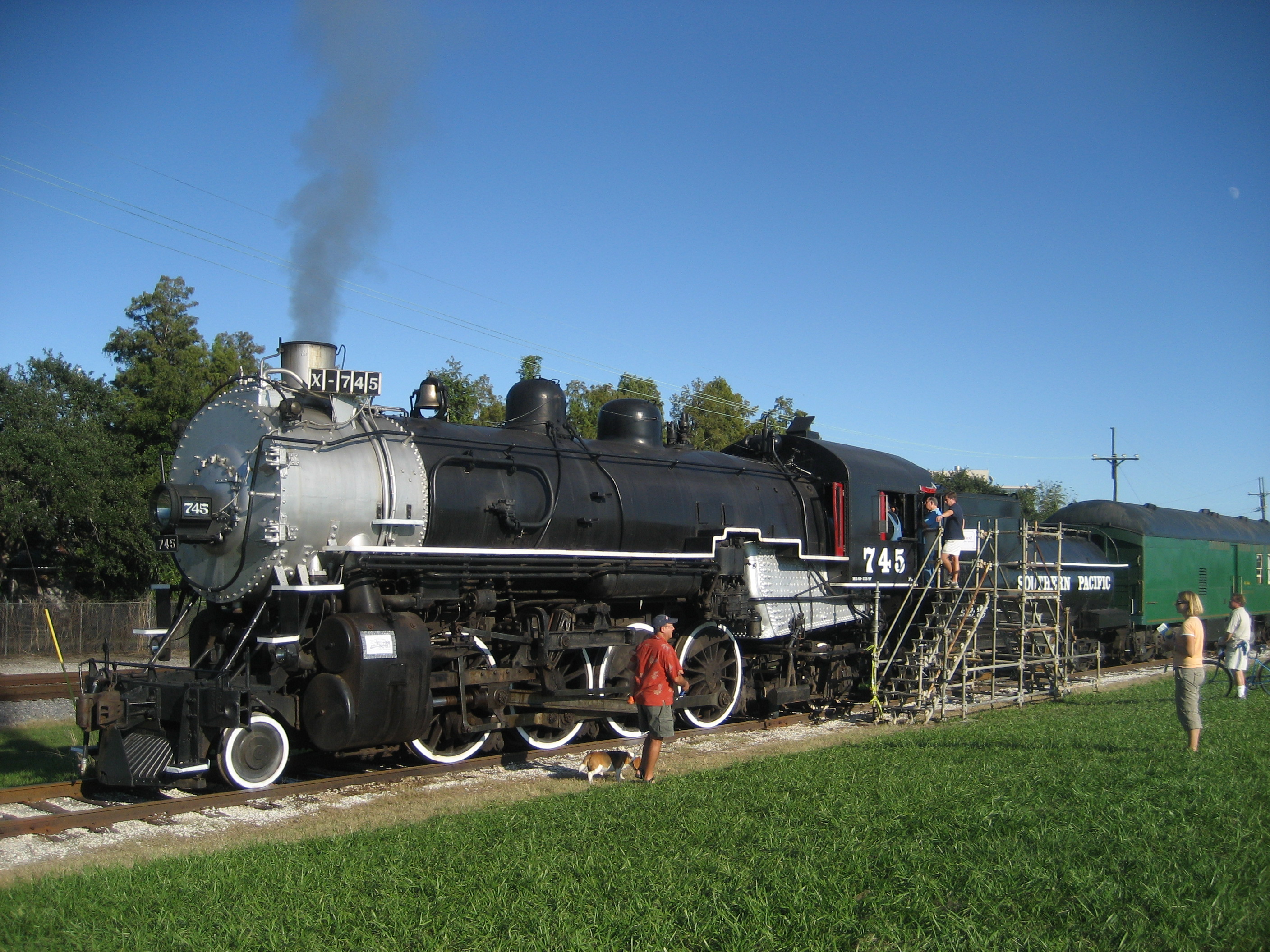
- SP 745 receiving visitors at "The Butterfly", Audubon Park, New Orleans, 2007
Type and origin
- Power type: Steam
- Builder: Algiers Shops of Southern Pacific Company
- Build date: February 1921
Specifications
- Configuration
  - Whyte: 2-8-2
  - UIC: 1′D1′ h2
- Gauge: 4 ft 8 1/2 in (1,435 mm)
- Leading dia.: 33 in (838 mm)
- Driver dia.: 63 in (1,600 mm)
- Trailing dia.: 42 in (1,067 mm)
- Length: 84 ft (26 m)
- Axle load: 54,200 lb (24.6 t)
- Adhesive weight: 213,380 lb (96.8 t)
- Loco weight: 285,980 lb (129.7 t)
- Total weight: 442,080 lb (200.5 t)
- Fuel type: Oil
- Fuel capacity: 3,800 US gal (14,000 L; 3,200 imp gal)
- Water cap.: 10,000 US gal (38,000 L; 8,300 imp gal)
- Firebox
  - Grate area: 70.4 sq ft (6.54 m^{2})
- Boiler pressure: 200 psi (1.38 MPa)
- Heating surface: 3,974 sq ft (369.2 m^{2})
- Superheater
  - Heating area: 865 sq ft (80.4 m^{2})
- Cylinders: Two, outside
- Cylinder size: 26 in × 28 in (660 mm × 711 mm)
- Valve gear: Walschaerts
- Valve type: Piston valves
- Loco brake: Air
- Train brakes: Air
- Couplers: Knuckle
Performance figures
- Maximum speed: 60 mph (97 km/h)
- Tractive effort: 51,076 lbf (227.20 kN)
- Factor of adh.: 4.18
Career
- Operators: Southern Pacific Lines; Louisiana Steam Train Association
- Class: Mk-5
- Numbers: SP 745
- Nicknames: Spirit of Louisiana
- Retired: 1956
- Restored: December 12, 2004
- Current owner: Louisiana Steam Train Association
- Disposition: Undergoing 1,472-day inspection and overhaul
- Southern Pacific Steam Locomotive #745
- U.S. National Register of Historic Places
- Location within Louisiana Location within the United States
- Location: Timbermill Museum, Garyville, LA
- Coordinates: 30°03′31″N 90°37′07″W
- NRHP reference No.: 98001077
- Added to NRHP: September 4, 1998

Southern Pacific 745 is a preserved Mk-5 class 2-8-2 "Mikado" type steam locomotive that was fabricated at the Southern Pacific Railroad's Algiers Shops at Algiers Point directly across the Mississippi River from New Orleans. With a 2-8-2 wheel configuration, No. 745 was built as a freight engine for the Southern Pacific Railroad Company (SP). The locomotive returned to service in 2004 after a restoration period. It is currently the only operating steam locomotive in Louisiana.

== History ==
=== Historic significance ===
SP 745 is regarded as a classic among steam locomotives and is on the U.S. National Register of Historic Places.

- First and foremost, the Mikado-type locomotive is considered by many to be the classic American freight locomotive from the golden age of steam locomotives, before Diesel-electric locomotives became widely used. About one out of every five locomotives in service on North American railroads was a Mikado or MacArthur.
- Second, despite well over 10,000 Mikados being built for American use, only twelve of them remain capable of operating on standard railroad tracks (others are smaller, narrow-gauge locomotives and a few are tank locomotive, designed only for short-range operation).
- Third, SP 745 is a "Harriman Standard Mikado". Railroad tycoon E. H. Harriman obtained control of the Southern Pacific and several other major railroads, and then insisted that all of them have their new locomotives built to more-or-less standard designs for each type, based on the best features known at the time. The Harriman standard Mikados, including SP 745 and the other members of Southern Pacific's Mk-5 class designed in 1913, were the first great attempt at standardizing the main freight locomotive. (The other great standardized version was the USRA Light Mikado design produced by a government committee during World War I.)
- Fourth, SP 745 suffered a boiler explosion on Paisano Pass in Texas in 1921, killing engineer William Francis Bohlman and throwing fireman Charles F. Robinson from the cab, knocking him unconscious. 745 was rebuilt following the accident and placed back into service.
- Finally, SP 745 is the last surviving steam locomotive built in Louisiana. It was one of a small batch of steam locomotives that the Southern Pacific built essentially from spare parts after World War I. The railroad built 745 and her sisters mostly at its Algiers shops in New Orleans. Number 745 was built in 1921, based on the 1913 Mk-5 class design.
  - Due to this special historic status, on May 19, 2022, SP 745 was officially designated as the official state locomotive of Louisiana, despite law broadly stating the entire 2-8-2 class.

=== Revenue service ===
Although the Southern Pacific’s (SP) Algiers Shops' primary function was the repair and service of locomotives, the demands of World War I caused the Shop to begin limited construction of locomotives. Among these were twelve locomotives that were part of the SP’s Class Mk-5 Mikado-type locomotives, numbered 738 to 749.

SP 745 transported primarily freight (owing to its relatively slow speed capabilities) throughout Louisiana and Texas during its tenure from 1921 until 1956. However, the locomotive was also used to transport soldiers during World War II. Although it was always painted "Southern Pacific" or "Southern Pacific Lines", it actually worked for SP subsidiaries. The state of Texas had a law that required railroads operating in the state to be based there. SP owned the Galveston, Harrisburg, and San Antonio, and sent 745 to work for it. Later 745 worked for another Texas-based, SP-owned line, the Texas and New Orleans Railroad (TNO). In these roles, 745 operated mostly between east Texas and the east end of the SP system in New Orleans.

In 1956, the locomotive completed its final journey by its own steam when it retired to Audubon Park in Uptown New Orleans, where it remained until 1984. There are three other surviving Mk-5 class 2-8-2s(Numbers 771, 786, and 794), but No. 745 remains as the last locomotive from the Mk-5s built by the SP’s Algiers Shops.

=== Excursion service ===
After Southern Pacific retired 745 in 1956, it was donated and placed on display in Audubon Park in New Orleans. It remained there until 1984, when it was removed to make room for expansion of the Audubon Zoo. Ownership was transferred to the Old Kenner Railroad Association (OKRA). After OKRA disbanded, Louisiana Railway Heritage Trust assumed ownership. The locomotive is currently leased to the Louisiana Steam Train Association (LASTA). In 2001, they had obtained enough donations and grants to begin a several year restoration project with volunteers and professional crews.

In December 2004, SP 745 conducted its first main-line operations in forty-eight years, running to Reserve, LA and back over the Kansas City Southern Railway (KCS) with William H. Johnson, engineer and David Bartee, fireman, as engine crew. The engine would also be givin the nickname the Spirit of Louisiana. Since then SP 745 has visited many areas around the state of Louisiana and southwest Mississippi as well as Kansas City, Missouri. Each year during Gretna Fest, 745 finds itself only a few miles from its birthplace on the old SP line.

In 2019, No. 745 was removed from service to undergo its Federal Railroad Administration (FRA) 1,472-day inspection and overhaul at the Timbermill Museum in nearby Garyville; the overhaul is expected to be completed in 2026.

== Appearances in media ==
SP 745 has been used in several films, including two major motion picture, the Brad Pitt / Cate Blanchett movie The Curious Case of Benjamin Button, for which it was painted to look like a Southern Railway locomotive, and Jonah Hex, where it took on characteristics of a much older locomotive.

== See also ==
- Southern Pacific 786 (Another preserved SP MK-5 class locomotive)
- Southern Railway 4501
- St. Louis–San Francisco 4003
- National Register of Historic Places listings in St. John the Baptist Parish, Louisiana
