= Austin Steam Train Association =

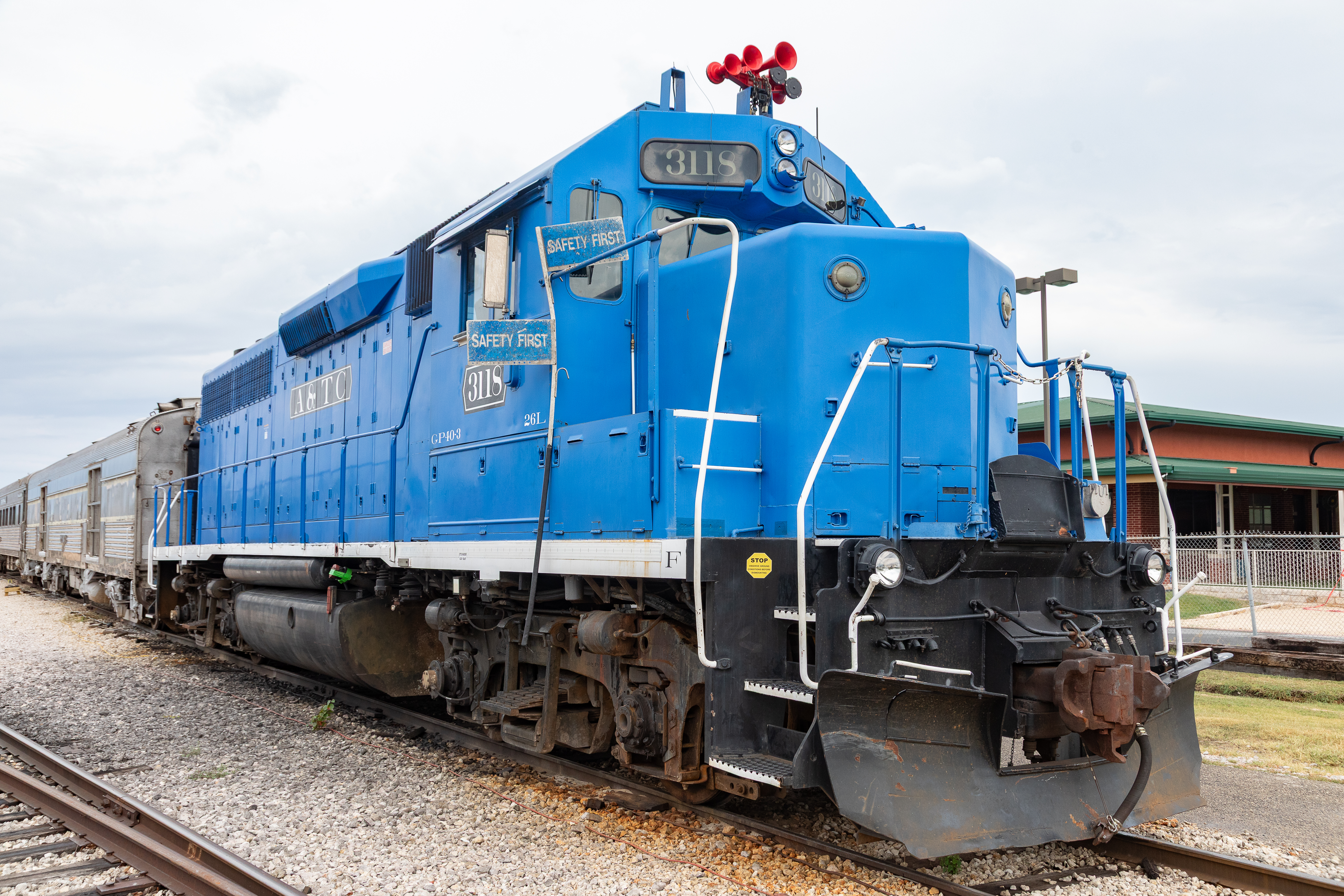

Overview
- Headquarters: Cedar Park, Texas
- Reporting mark: ATCX
- Locale: Williamson County, Texas
- Dates of operation: 1989–present

Technical
- Track gauge: 4 ft 8 1/2 in (1,435 mm) standard gauge
- Length: 167 miles (269 km)

Other
- Website: www.austinsteamtrain.org

The Austin Steam Train Association (reporting mark ATCX), also known as the Austin & Texas Central Railroad or ASTA, is a heritage railroad based in Cedar Park, Texas, that operates passenger excursion trains over ex-Southern Pacific (SP) tracks between Cedar Park and Burnet. The railroad offers coach and first class service and special seasonal trips. In addition to 100 volunteers, ASTA employs seven full time staff members.

== History ==
In 1956, the Southern Pacific Railroad donated 2-8-2 "Mikado" steam locomotive #786 to the City of Austin. It was displayed at a vacant lot behind the Central Fire Station between 4th and 5th Streets downtown.

In 1989, a group of railroad preservationists officially founded the Austin Steam Train Association to restore #786 to operation. Excursions officially began in 1992.

In 1993, ASTA moved into its rail yard in Cedar Park, Texas.

After #786 was sidelined for repairs in 1999, ASTA purchased a diesel locomotive to haul excursions, ALCO RSD-15 #442 (ex-ATSF #842). #442 was the main power for ASTA excursions until it went down for repairs in 2016.

In 2017, ASTA leased a rebuilt EMD GP40-3, HZRX #3134 (ex-PC 3118). In 2025, they purchased #3134 and renumbered it back to #3118.

As of November 2025, the restorations of #786 and #442 are ongoing.

== Trackage ==
The Austin Steam Train Association operates excursions over a portion of the ex-Southern Pacific Llano Branch owned by CapMetro. The Bertram Flyer runs between Cedar Park and Bertram, while the Hill Country Flyer runs between Cedar Park and Burnet. The Capital City Flyer previously operated between Cedar Park and Downtown Station in Austin, but it has not run since the mid-2010s. ASTA excursions share trackage with CapMetro Rail commuter service and Austin Western freight trains.

== Equipment ==
=== Steam locomotive ===
- Southern Pacific 2-8-2 #786 (under restoration)

=== Diesel locomotives ===
- Austin & Texas Central ALCO RSD-15 #442 (ex-ATSF #842) (under restoration)
- Austin & Texas Central EMD GP40 #3118 (ex-PC #3118) (operational)
- Belt Railway of Chicago ALCO C424 #605 (sold but still on property)
- VLIX 158 ALCO S2 #158 (sold but still on property)

=== Passenger cars ===
- ATCX concession car "Cedar Park" (ex-ATSF)
- ATCX power car (ex-ATSF) (under restoration)
- Atchison, Topeka & Santa Fe (ATSF) lounge "Maurice Beckham"
- Atchison, Topeka & Santa Fe (ATSF) lounge "Nambe"
- Denver & Rio Grande Western (DRGW) coach "Silver Pine"
- Kansas City Southern (KCS) observation "Good Cheer" (awaiting restoration)
- Milwaukee Road (MILW) coach "Buckeye Lake" (ex-DL&W)
- Milwaukee Road (MILW) coach "Buckeye Trail" (ex NKP)
- Missouri-Kansas-Texas (MKT) coach "New Braunfels"
- Missouri Pacific (MP) lounge "Eagle Cliff"
- New York Central (NYC) lounge "Rippling Stream"
- New York Central (NYC) lounge #41
- Southern Railway (SOU) business car #4 "Boonesborough" (under restoration)

=== Freight cars ===
- Missouri-Kansas-Texas (MKT) flatcar #13551

=== Caboose ===
- Atchison, Topeka & Santa Fe (ATSF) caboose #999418
