= Southern Pacific 18 =

Preserved Narrow-gauge 4-6-0 steam locomotive

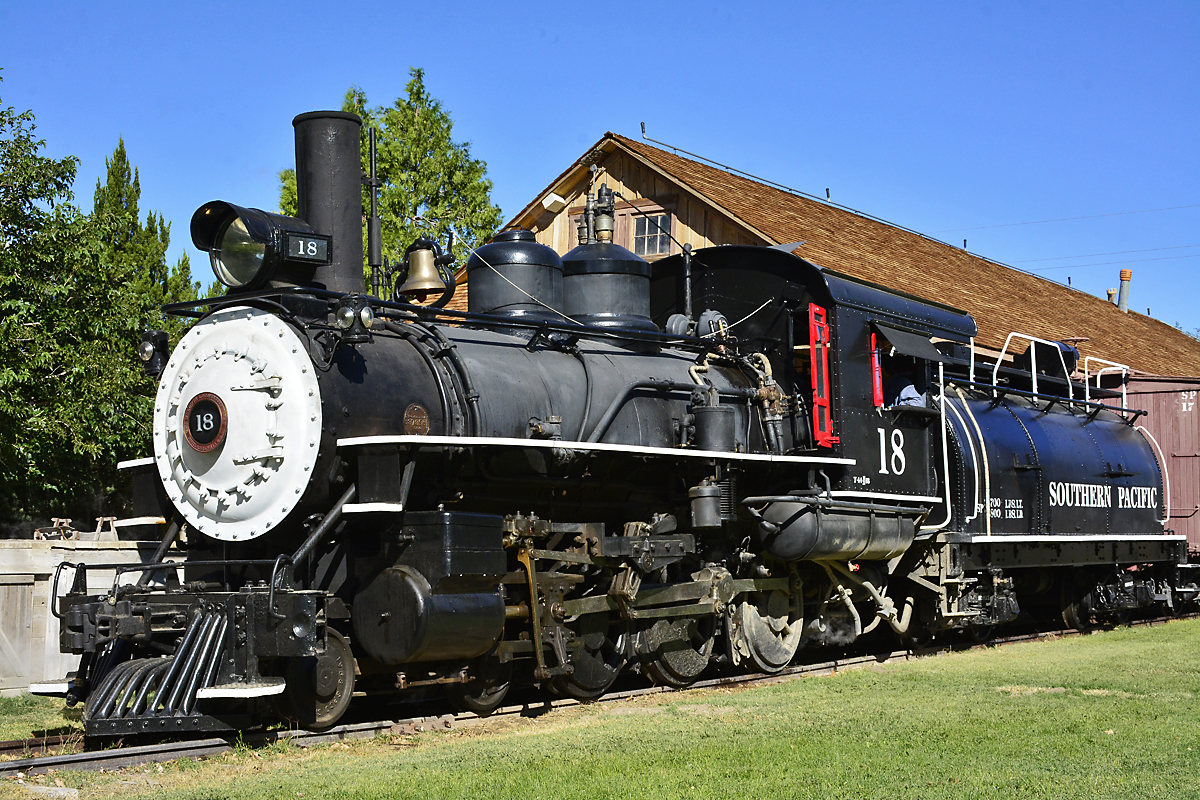
- No. 18 at Laws, California, in 2017
Type and origin
- Power type: Steam
- Builder: Baldwin Locomotive Works
- Serial number: 37395
- Model: 10-26 D 285
- Build date: December 1911
Specifications
- Configuration
  - Whyte: 4-6-0
  - UIC: 2′C
- Gauge: 3 ft (914 mm)
- Driver dia.: 44 in (1.118 m)
- Tender weight: 87,000 pounds (39 t)
- Tender type: Whaleback
- Fuel type: Oil
- Boiler pressure: 180 lbf/in^{2} (1.24 MPa)
- Cylinders: Two, outside
- Cylinder size: 16 in × 20 in (406 mm × 508 mm)
- Valve gear: Inverted Walschaerts
- Valve type: Piston valves
- Loco brake: Air
- Train brakes: Air
- Couplers: Knuckle
Performance figures
- Tractive effort: 17,800 lbf (79.18 kN)
Career
- Operators: Nevada–California–Oregon Railway; Southern Pacific; Eastern California Museum; Durango and Silverton Narrow Gauge Railroad (leased)
- Numbers: NCO 12; SP 18
- Nicknames: Slim Princess
- Locale: Eastern California
- Delivered: 1911
- Retired: 1955
- Restored: July 2017
- Current owner: Eastern California Museum
- Disposition: Operational

Southern Pacific 18 is a 4-6-0 "Ten-wheeler" type narrow-gauge steam locomotive, built by the Baldwin Locomotive Works in 1911.

== History ==
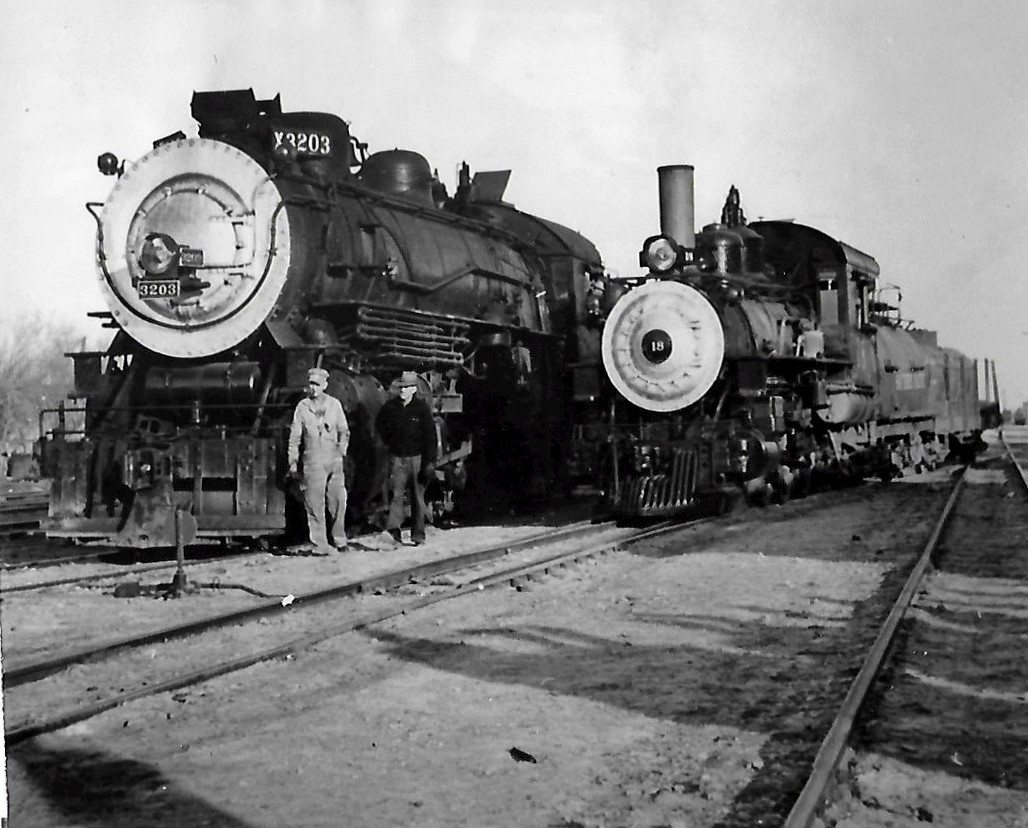
No. 18 with standard gauge Southern Pacific locomotive No. 3203 at Owenyo, California, in 1953

No. 18 was originally built in 1911 for the Nevada–California–Oregon Railway (NCO) as No. 12 until it was sold to Southern Pacific (SP) in 1926. It was renumbered to 18 and worked the rest of its career on SP's narrow-gauge lines along with sister locomotives Nos. 8 and 9, serving the desert areas of Nevada and California.

In 1954, a new narrow-gauge General Electric diesel locomotive was purchased as Southern Pacific No. 1 to replace Nos. 8 and 18, resulting in the two steam locomotives retiring soon. No. 8 was donated to the City of Sparks, Nevada, while No. 18 was donated to the City of Independence, California.

No. 9 was the last SP narrow-gauge steam locomotive to retire and pull a passenger train, with the last day of steam operation on the narrow-gauge line being August 25, 1959, and was retired a year later.

The locomotive was preserved, along with No. 8 and No. 9. Between 2009 and July 2017, No. 18 was restored for operating condition on a short stretch of track in a public park in Independence, California. Then, in early November 2018, No. 18 was leased to the Durango and Silverton Narrow Gauge Railroad (D&SNG) in Durango, Colorado, to train the crew on an oil burning steam locomotive, as the D&SNG is restoring K-37 No. 493 to operating condition while also converting the locomotive from burning coal to burning oil. (Note: The restoration work of the No. 493 locomotive was later completed on January 24, 2020.) As of 2023, the D&SNG is aiming to have most, if not all, of their operational steam locomotives converted from burning coal to burning oil.

On April 9, 2019, while the locomotive was pulling an excursion, a piston ring broke on the engineer's side, creating a hole in the right-side cylinder head. The failure of the piston ring occurred on the grades between Hermosa and Rockwood. The four passenger cars, along with 100 passengers on board, were hauled back to Durango, and No. 18 was hauled back to Durango for repairs the next day. On July 22, 2019, the locomotive returned to service and returned to the Eastern California Museum three months later.

On April 8, 2021, it was announced that No. 18 will return to the D&SNG from April to October 2021, and on April 11, it departed for Durango, Colorado via truck. After arriving back at Durango, No. 18 has been used for many double header runs to Silverton since early May 2021 and will be taking part in a photo charter in September 2021 alongside the newly restored No. 493.

On the Fourth of July weekend of 2022, No. 18 visited the Nevada State Railroad Museum in Carson City, Nevada, for the Great Western Steam Up event, which marked the 150th anniversary of the completion of the Virginia & Truckee Railroad.

== See also ==
- Southern Pacific 8
- Southern Pacific 9

== Bibliography ==
- Drury, George H. (2015). Guide to North American Steam Locomotives (2nd ed.). Kalmbach Media. ISBN 978-1-62700-259-2.
