= Eastern California Museum =

Museum in California

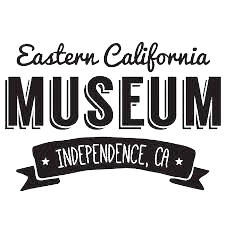

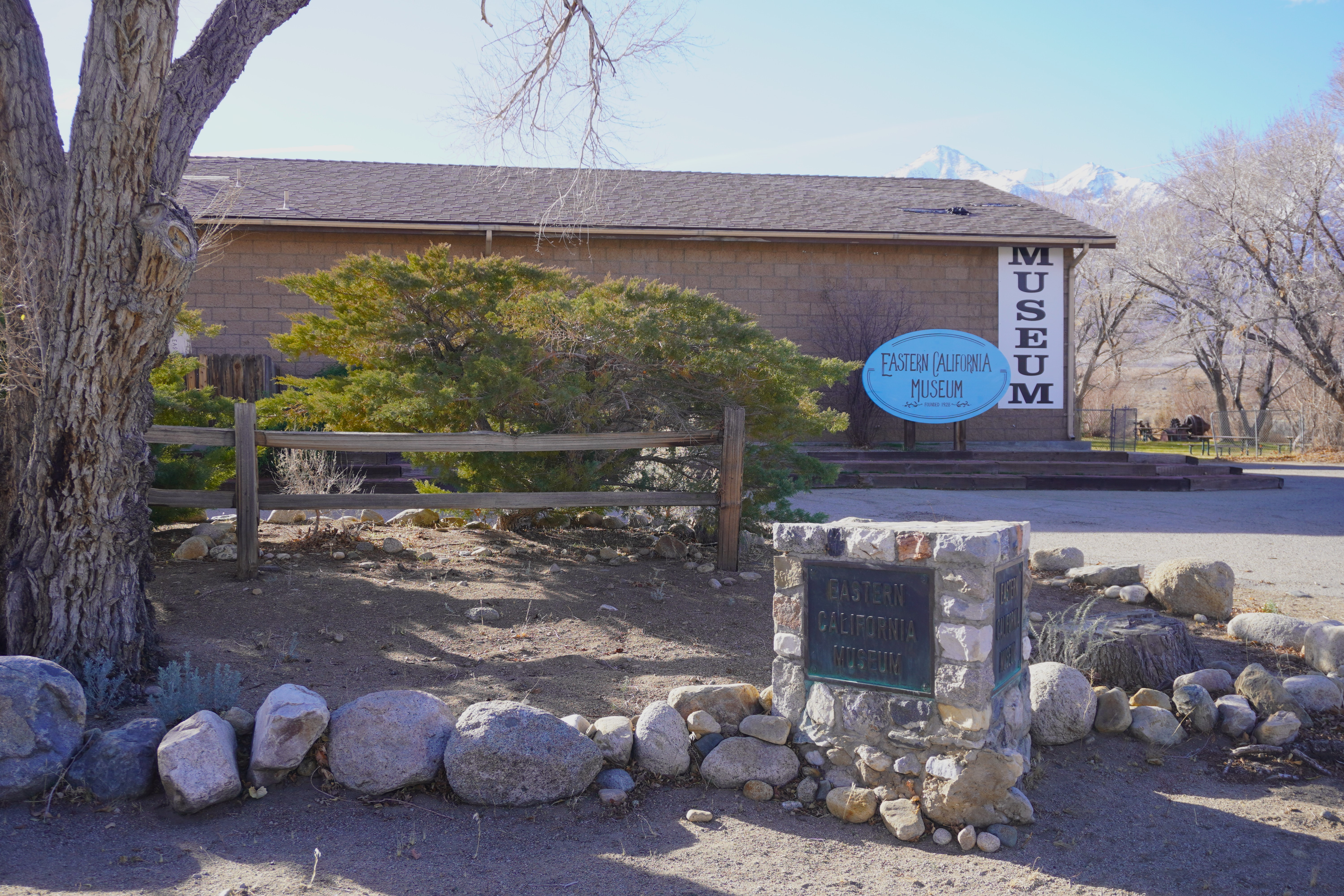
- The museum in 2024

- Location within California Location within the United States
- Established: May 5, 1928
- Location: 155 N Grant St, Independence, CA 93526
- Coordinates: 36.8019°N 118.2039°W
- Type: Historical museum
- Collection size: ~10,700 items
- Founders: Ralph Bell, Charles Forbes, Frank Parcher, Marie Louise Parcher, and William Sanford
- Owner: Inyo County
- Website: fecm.org

The Eastern California Museum is a history and heritage museum in Independence, California. It was founded in 1928 and showcases the history of the region of Eastern California. It is operated by Inyo County.

== History ==
Due to the rapid development in Owens Valley in the early 20th century, many people realized that much of the area's history could be lost unless preserved. In early 1928, a group of young men consisting of Ralph Bell, Frank Parcher, Charles Forbes, and William Sanford were interested in Native American culture, locating and photographing petroglyphs and also collecting artifacts. Parcher's mother, Marie Louise Parcher, came up with the idea to have a museum to exhibit the collections the four men had gathered. Thus, the Eastern California Museum Association was born, with Marie Parcher acting as its first president (often referred to as "Mrs. W.C. Parcher" for her husband William Chandler Parcher). It was formally organized on May 5, 1928 at the Inyo County Library's Bishop Branch.

The association was granted a room in the basement of the Inyo County Courthouse for the storage of its exhibits in 1929 and obtained a second one in the 1950s. The museum's current building was dedicated in 1968 to G. Walter and Maude Dow for their donations to the museum that allowed the structure to be constructed. Also starting in 1968, it went under the operation of Inyo County. The renaming of the Eastern California Museum Association to the Eastern California Historical Society and the formation of the Friends of the Eastern California Museum both occurred in the 1980s.

In 2019, a tusk most likely coming from a species in the genus Mammuthus was loaned to the museum by the Los Angeles Department of Water and Power. The tusk was found in 2015 but had to be stabilized by the Environmental Science Associates before it was ready for display.

== Exhibits ==
The museum contains one of the most extensive collections of Owens Valley Paiute and Timbisha baskets in California, with over 400 and 100 other related artifacts. It also has hundreds of photographs donated by former interments of Manzanar depicting everyday life in the camp. Over 70 were taken by noted photographer Tōyō Miyatake. The locomotive Southern Pacific 18 is housed at the museum. There are also mining wagons from Eastern California's mining era, construction and mining equipment, and an exhibit detailing the California water wars.

The museum has over 27,000 historic photographs of the Eastern California area in its collection, with many of them on display. Most of them were taken from the late 1800s to the 1950s. The exterior of the museum also has a native plant garden, named after Mary DeDecker, a botanist who worked mainly in Eastern California. It is a collaboration with the Bristlecone Chapter of the California Native Plant Society, which DeDecker founded.

The museum manages two historic houses in Independence: the Edwards House, which was built by the town planner, Thomas Edwards, in 1861, and the Commander's House, which was built from recycled lumber from the remains of Fort Independence in the late 1880s.
