= Excursion car =

Open railroad car intended for passengers

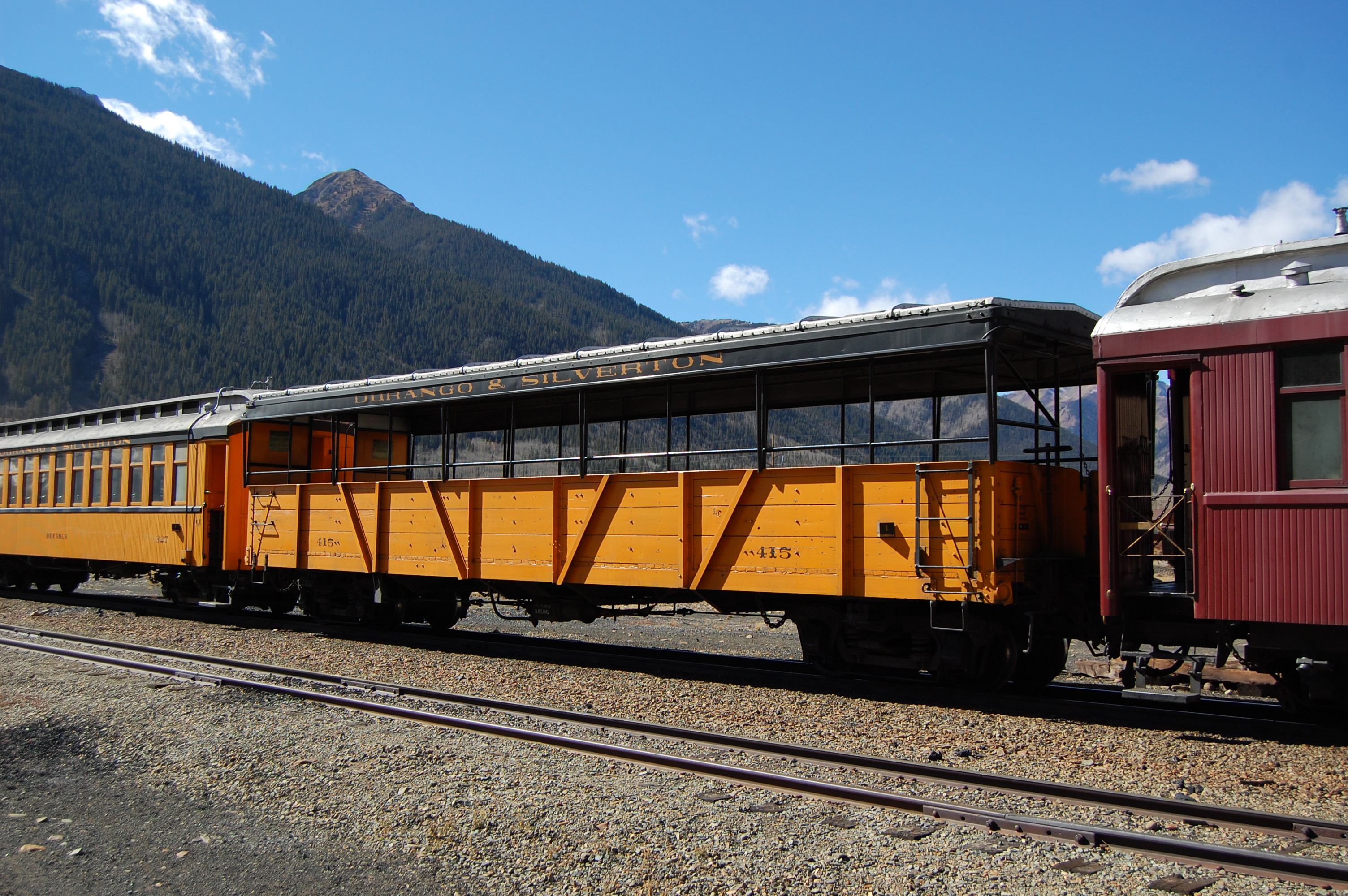
Roofed excursion car on the Durango and Silverton Narrow Gauge Railroad

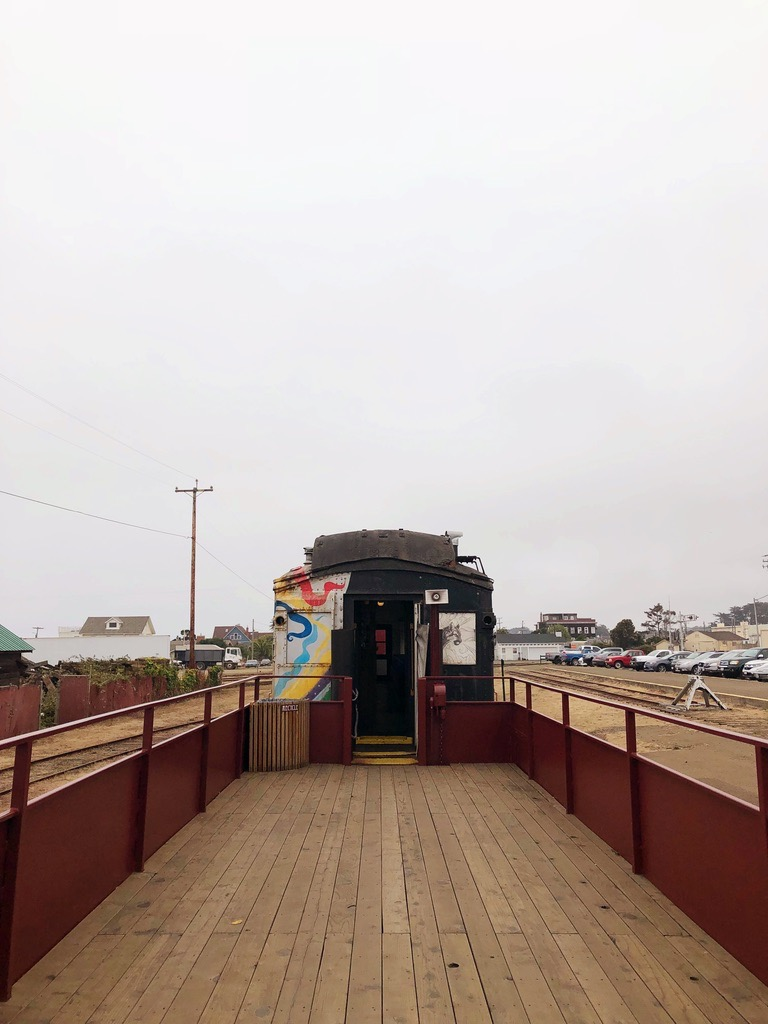
Unroofed excursion car on the California Western Railroad

An excursion car is a type of passenger railroad car intended for transporting passengers to special events or through scenic terrain during good weather. Excursion cars are designed to carry a large number of passengers in an open air environment.

== History ==
During the late 19th century, newly constructed North American railroads offered reduced-fare excursion trains to introduce potential passengers to their service routes. Later excursions were scheduled to reach special events. Excursion cars were required when the number of passengers transported during excursions exceeded the capacity of the railroad's passenger car inventory for routine service. Some established railroads serving resort destinations owned excursion cars designed for recurring use on holidays or during vacation season. Excursion cars remain in use on some heritage railways.

== Variations ==
Flatcars or gondolas were sometimes temporarily converted to excursion cars by addition of seats and safety railings. Some excursion cars built for low speed had transverse benches extending across the full width of the car accessed by steps extending along the length of the side of the car. Excursion cars built for higher speeds typically have waist-high side walls with no windows and may be either unroofed or roofed for shade. Some cars have benches for seating while others expect passengers to stand.
