= Southern Pacific 8 =

Preserved Narrow-gauge 4-6-0 steam locomotive

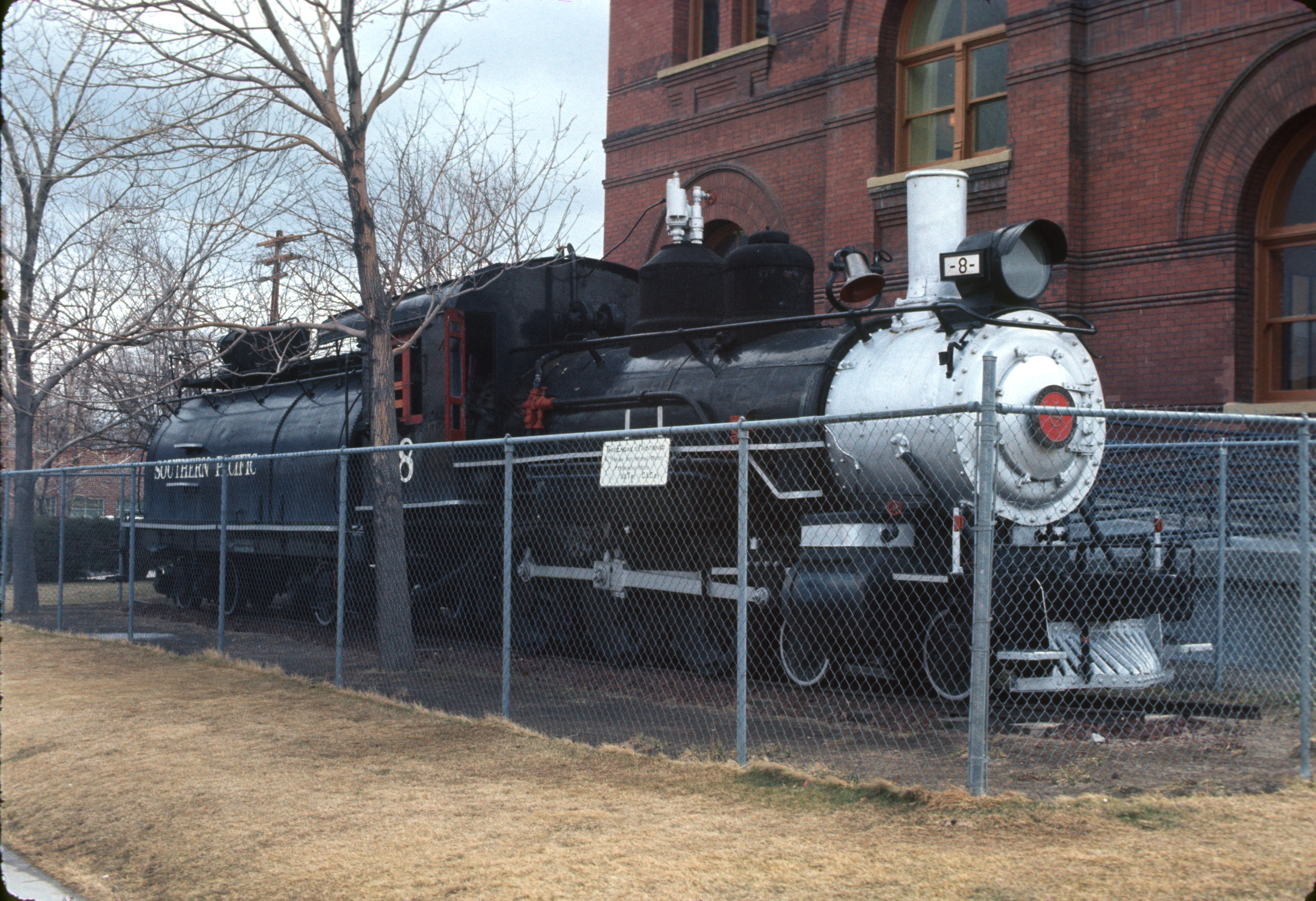
- No. 8 on display at Carson City, Nevada on February 19, 1975
Type and origin
- Power type: Steam
- Builder: Baldwin Locomotive Works
- Serial number: 31445
- Model: 10-26 D 217
- Build date: 1907
Specifications
- Configuration
  - Whyte: 4-6-0
  - UIC: 2′C
- Gauge: 3 ft (914 mm)
- Driver dia.: 44 in (1.118 m)
- Loco weight: 81,000 pounds (37 t)
- Fuel type: Bunker C fuel oil
- Boiler pressure: 180 lbf/in^{2} (1.24 MPa)
- Cylinders: Two, outside
- Cylinder size: 16 in × 20 in (406 mm × 508 mm)
- Valve gear: Stephenson
- Valve type: Piston valves
- Loco brake: Air
- Train brakes: Air
- Couplers: Knuckle
Performance figures
- Tractive effort: 17,800 lbf (79.18 kN)
Career
- Operators: Nevada–California–Oregon Railway; Southern Pacific Company
- Numbers: NCO 8 SP 8
- Retired: 1954
- Disposition: On static display

Southern Pacific 8 is a 4-6-0 "Ten-Wheeler" type narrow-gauge steam locomotive, built in 1907 by the Baldwin Locomotive Works (BLW).

It was originally built for the Nevada–California–Oregon Railway (NCO) as their second No. 8, and was sold to Southern Pacific (SP) in 1929. She spent the rest of its career hauling passengers and freight along Southern Pacific's Keeler Branch. The locomotive, along with sisters 9 and #18 were nicknamed "The Slim Princesses".

In 1954, an GE 50 Ton diesel locomotive was purchased, relegating steam power on the Southern Pacific's narrow-gauge line to backup duty. Locomotive #8 was retired in 1955 after 48 years of service and donated to the State of Nevada. Now owned by the Nevada State Railroad Museum (NSRM), it has been on display at Lillard Park at Sparks, Nevada since 1975 after negotiations of a long-term loan.

== See also ==
- Southern Pacific 9
- Southern Pacific 18
