= Laws, California =

Unincorporated community in California, United States

Laws
- Unincorporated community
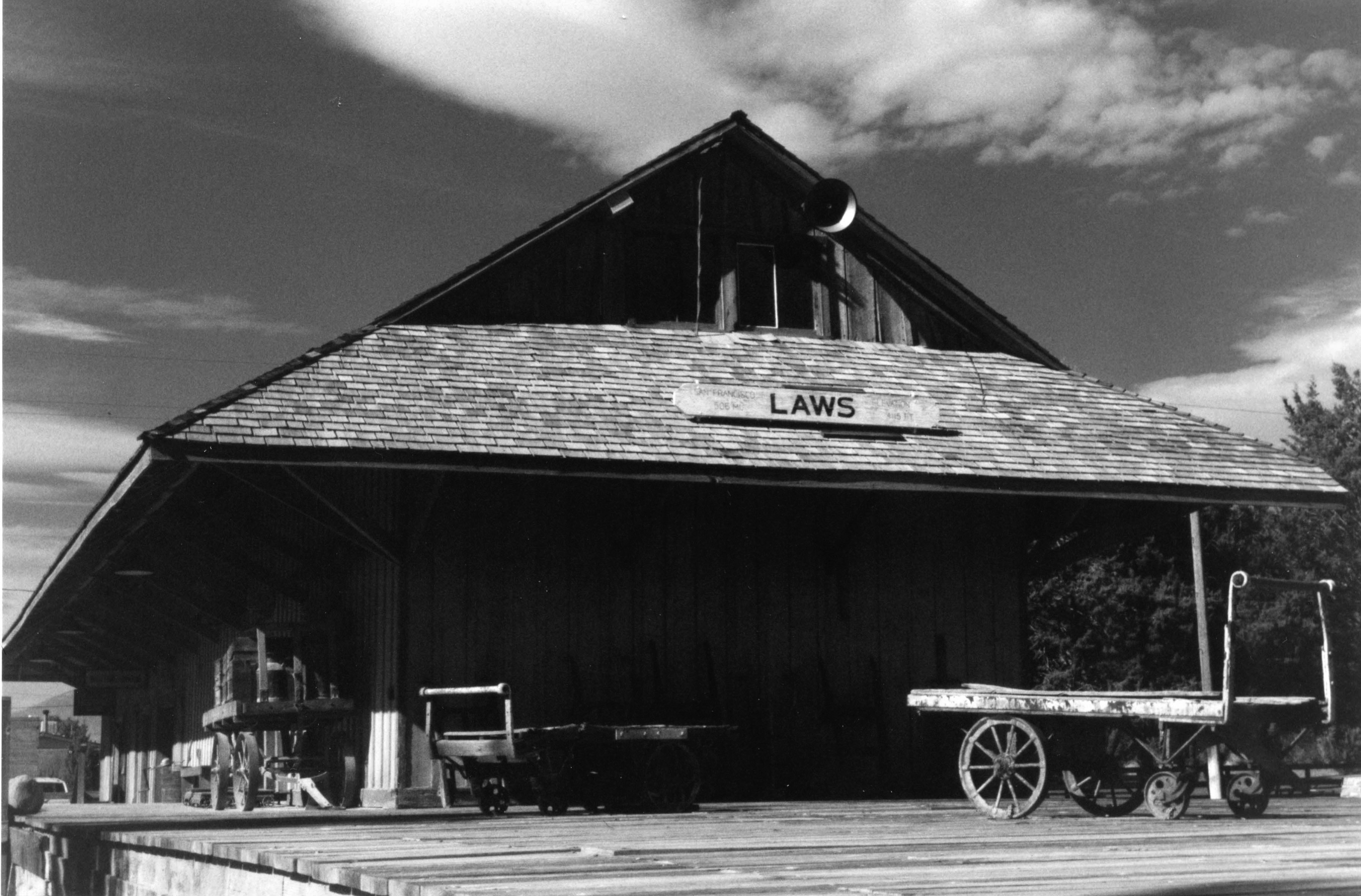
- Laws station in 1998

- Location in California
- Coordinates: 37°24′03″N 118°20′44″W
- Country: United States
- State: California
- County: Inyo
- Elevation: 4,117 ft (1,255 m)
- Time zone: UTC-8 (Pacific Time Zone)
  - Summer (DST): UTC-7 (PDT)
- ZIP Code: 93514
- Area code: 760
- GNIS feature ID: 1659742

California Historical Landmark
- Official name: Laws Station
- Reference no.: 953

Laws (formerly Station and Bishop Depot) is an unincorporated community in Inyo County, California, United States. Laws is located 4 miles (6.4 km) northeast of Bishop on U.S. Route 6, towards the Nevada state line.

== Geography ==
The town is bordered by the White Mountains to the east and the Sierra Nevada Mountains, the "Eastern Sierras," to the west. It is located near the Owens River in upper Owens Valley.

== History ==
The settlement of Station was formed in 1883 as a depot on the Carson and Colorado Railroad. The name was changed to Laws in honor of R.J. Laws, a railroad official. A post office operated at Laws from 1887 to 1963. The town of Laws was a railroad station along a 3 ft (914 mm) narrow gauge railway portion of the Southern Pacific Railroad.

Today the town of Laws exists as a museum of Owens Valley and Eastern Sierra Nevada history. It is registered as California Historical Landmark #953.

== Laws Railroad Museum and Historic Site ==
In 2015, the travel website Atlas Obscura designated this museum as one of 160 "international gems."

=== Railroads displays ===
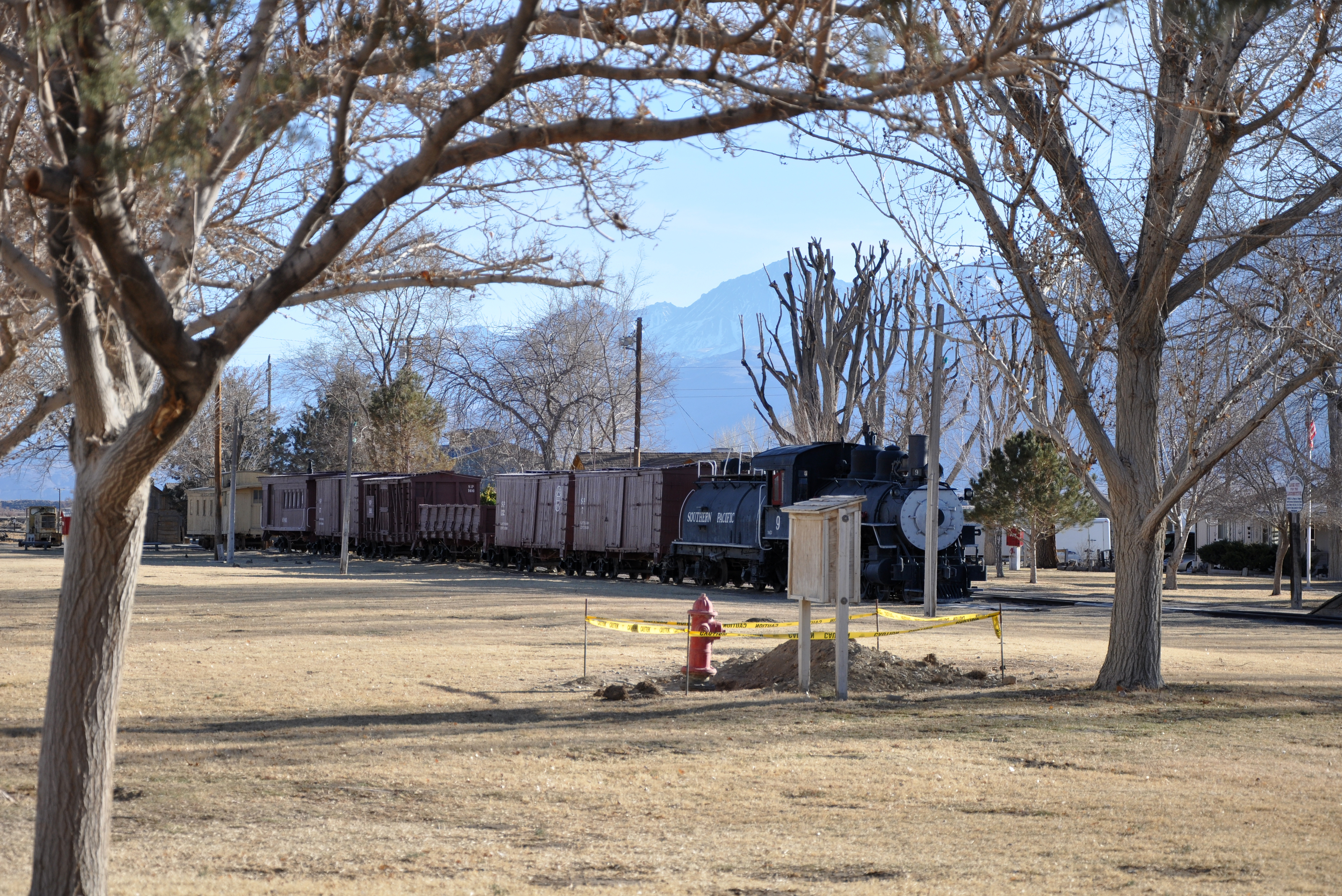
Train in the historic district

The Laws Railroad Museum and Historic Site includes static displays of a train consisting of an oil-fired steam locomotive, Southern Pacific 9, and several freight cars from the Southern Pacific Railroad's 3 ft (914 mm) narrow gauge lines. There are also operating locomotives (none of which are steam-powered) that run on the narrow gauge tracks in the museum's grounds. The museum's display explains that the railroad was relied on by many Eastern Sierra communities before modern roads were built during the 1950s and 1960s.

A station agent's home is located south of the railroad station. Docents portray the station agent on most days, helping visitors understand the period culture.

The Museum includes several historic buildings moved to the site from downtown Bishop. There is a church and school house. A vehicle on display was a 1949 ambulance, which was later painted black, stripped of emergency lighting, and used as a hearse. Medical implements from a historic local doctor's office are on display. There is also a wooden Western Electric type 11 telephone booth.

=== Owens Valley history displays ===
Owens Valley history, including construction and impact of the Los Angeles Aqueduct project, or "Owens Valley Aqueduct," is described in Museum displays. Today, land on all sides of the museum is property of the Los Angeles Department of Water and Power, of the City of Los Angeles. Photographs and docents show and explain that the Valley included large tracts of agricultural land; from the Paiute Native American era, through pioneer days, to the Aqueduct 'water wars era' that began diversions of water in the early 20th century to Los Angeles. A tour docent, sharing a vintage black-and-white photograph, explained "This is a picture of my mom's apple orchard."

=== Mining displays ===
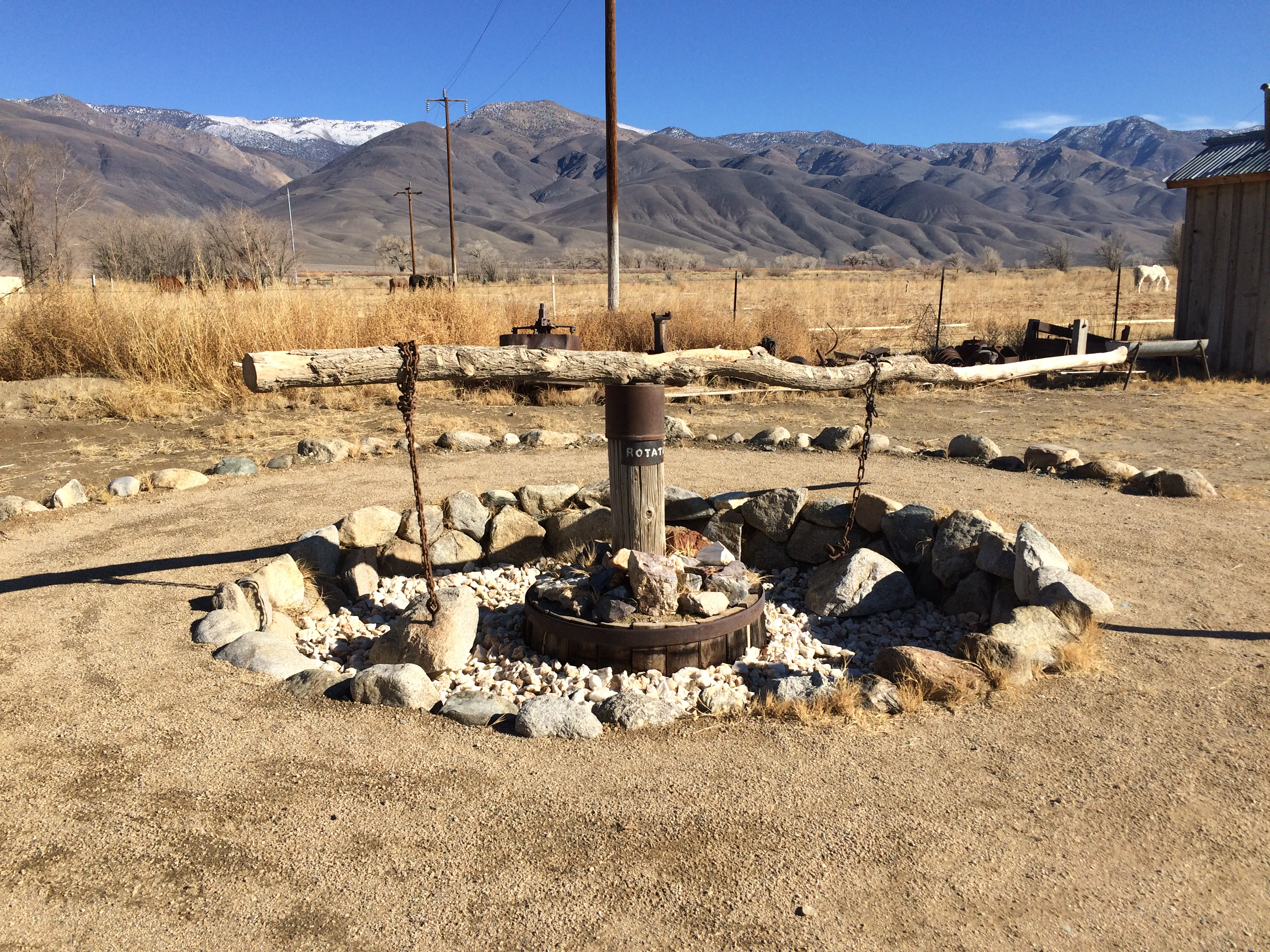
An arrastra, whose rotating sweep arm drags heavy rocks over ore-bearing rocks to crush them.

The museum also houses an extensive collection of old and reconstructed mining equipment. Recently, museum volunteers recreated a primitive human- or animal-powered ore-crusher called an arrastra:

A new arrastra was built out of native materials, in this case an elm tree and hardware such as chains found in the museum's bone yard. An arrastra is a basic mine milling machine used to pulverize rock. A sweep arm – the elm log – is rotated and drags heavy stones over pieces of ore-rich rock to be pulverized. After many rotations, the rock breaks apart and the ore is exposed. It's heavy labor that was done by a beast of burden before mechanization.

== Government ==
In the California State Legislature, Laws is in the 8th senatorial district, represented by Democrat Angelique Ashby, and the 26th Assembly district, represented by Democrat Patrick Ahrens.

In the United States House of Representatives, Laws is in California's 8th congressional district, represented by Democrat John Garamendi.

== See also ==
=== Desert railroads ===
- Tonopah and Tidewater Railroad
- Las Vegas and Tonopah Railroad
- Carson and Colorado Railway
- Death Valley Railroad
- Borate and Daggett Railroad
- Waterloo Mining Railroad
- Calico and Odessa Railroad
- Trona Railway
- List of defunct California railroads
- List of defunct Nevada railroads

=== Locale ===
- Bishop, California
- California Water Wars
- Cadillac Desert
- Fish Slough Area of Critical Environmental Concern
- Category: Geography of Inyo County, California
- Inyo National Forest
- Manzanar
- Owens River
