= Hotel Drover =

Coordinates: 32°47′14″N 97°20′51″W

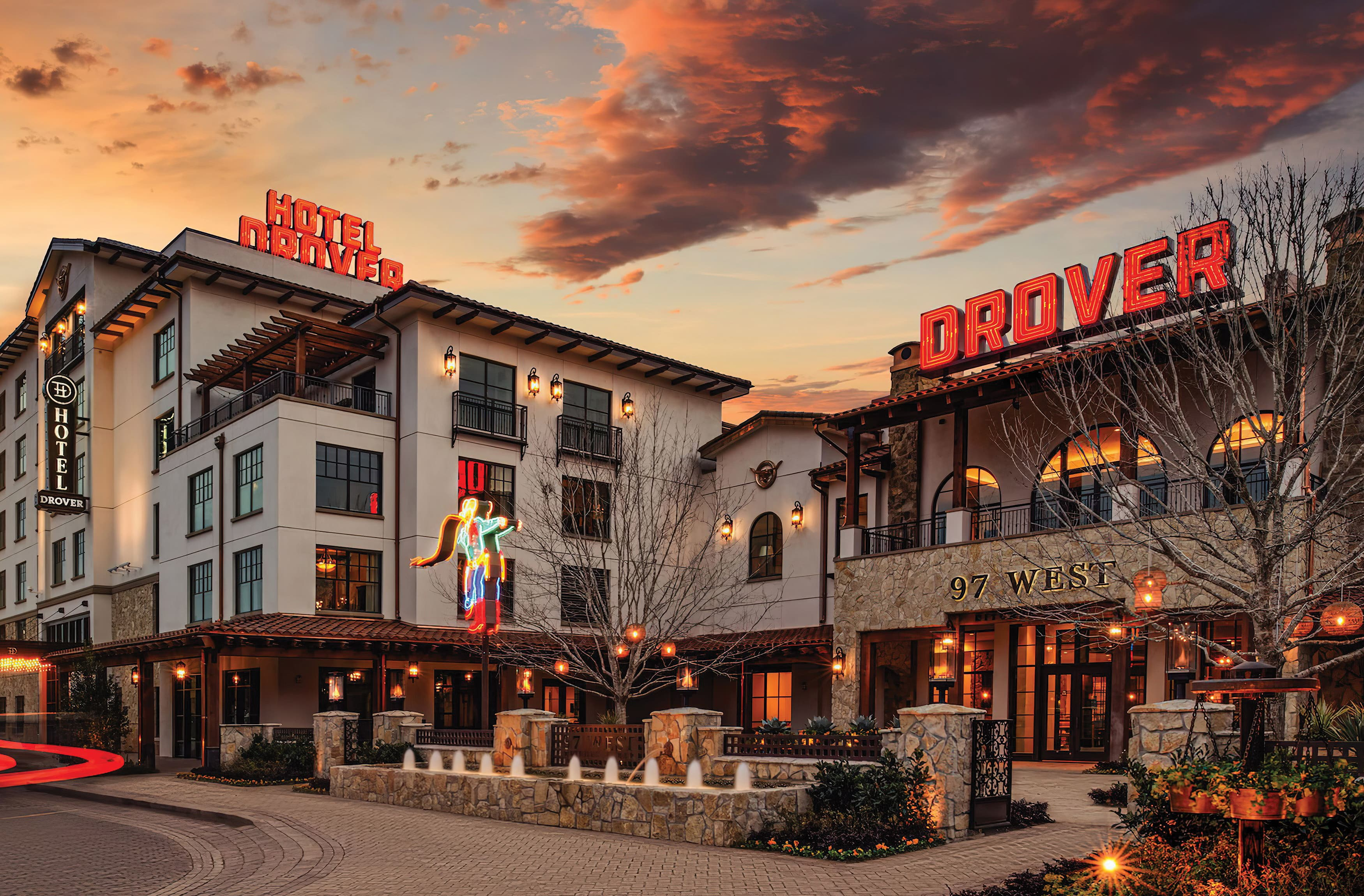
- Interactive map of the Hotel Drover area

General information
- Location: Fort Worth, Texas
- Opening: March 25, 2021
- Owner: Majestic Reality

Other information
- Parking: Valet

Website
- http://hoteldrover.com

Hotel Drover is an Autograph Collection hotel in the Stockyards district of Fort Worth, Texas.

== Description ==
It is a Western themed hotel, with 200 guest rooms, and three cabanas. Its decor includes a ten-foot antler chandelier, a cowboy neon sign display and a life-size sculpture of drovers. Each Christmas, the hotel hosts the "12 Days of Drover" with Cowboy Santa and live reindeer. The Michelin Guide described it as "unmistakably Texan but without crossing too far into kitsch".

The hotel property includes shops, bars, restaurants, and entertainment venues. Its most well known restaurant is 97 West, which is known for Southern cuisine including steaks and game meats like antelope and pheasant.

== History ==
Hotel Drover was built as part of the redevelopment of Mule Alley in the Fort Worth Stockyards. The hotel is part of the Autograph Collection owned by Marriott International. The hotel held its grand opening on March 25, 2021.

The hotel received a Michelin Key from the Michelin Guide.

In 2022, Hotel Drover bought the historic Stockyards Hotel.

== In popular culture ==
Hotel Drover appeared in the television series Landman.

== Awards ==
- Travel + Leisure World's Best Awards: Voted the No. 1 Best Hotel in Dallas-Fort Worth (2022, 2024, and 2025).
- Michelin Key: Hotel Drovers 97 West is recognized among the world's top hotel restaurants.
- Great Place to Work: Hotel Drover is consistently certified as a Great Place to Work by its employees.
