= Grapevine Vintage Railroad =

Railroad in Texas, United States

Coordinates: 32.9338°N 97.0780°W

Grapevine Vintage Railroad (GVRR)
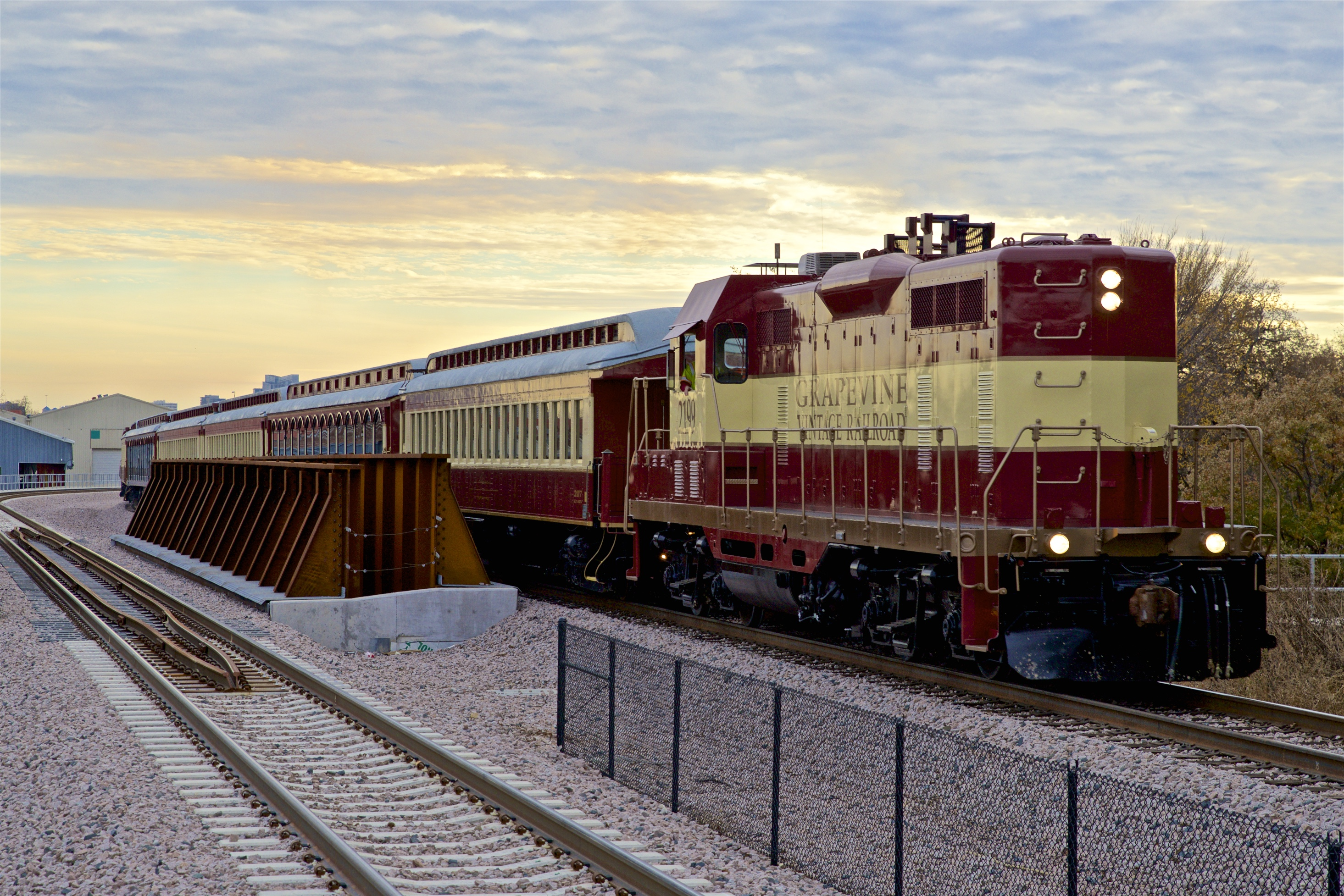
- GVRR passenger train operating from Fort Worth to Grapevine-Main Street station in 2019.

Overview
- Other name: GVRX (reporting mark)
- Status: Operational, non-common carrier
- Owner: The City of Grapevine
- Locale: Tarrant County, Texas
- Termini: Main Street station (east); Fort Worth Stockyards (west)
- Stations: 2

Service
- Type: Excursion and Special Event Train
- Operator: The City of Grapevine
- Rolling stock: See below

Technical
- Track gauge: 4 ft 8 1/2 in (1,435 mm)
- Highest elevation: 640 feet (200 m)

The Grapevine Vintage Railroad (GVRR) is an excursion and special event railroad in Grapevine, Texas, that runs from the Grapevine–Main Street station in Grapevine to the Fort Worth Stockyards. GVRR is owned and operated by the City of Grapevine.

== History and description ==
The railroad operates passenger excursion trains using GVRR 2199 (EMD GP7) to pull its 1920s-era Victorian coaches. Since early 2016, GVRR 2248 has been out of service for overhaul, with the new addition of ditch lights and LED head lights per a contract with the Durango and Silverton. Two additional diesel locomotives, GVRR 2014 and GVRR 2016 (EMD FL9) are also used.

Passengers board at Grapevine's historic Main Street station and the train operates over a 21.99-mile (34 kilometer) route to the Fort Worth Stockyards on former trackage that was owned by the St. Louis Southwestern Railway (aka the "Cotton Belt"). The main run starts in Grapevine and goes to the Fort Worth Stockyards. From its stop in the stockyards, the train then runs a separate excursion along the Trinity River to the 8th Ave Yard of the Fort Worth and Western Railroad, then returns to the stockyards. Upon return to the stockyards, the engine turns around via a turntable and runs around the train on a siding, then it departs back toward Grapevine.

The route was formerly operated by the FWWR and was known as the Tarantula train. In 1999 and for a short period of time the FWWR contracted with Coe Rail, Inc. for operation of the Tarantula train. An accident with a freight train in 2000 caused the Fort Worth & Western to sever the relationship and took back control of passenger operations. Later that year, the City of Grapevine expressed interest to FWWR owner William Davis in owning and operating the Tarantula train. After receiving an offer, the purchase was complete around 2005.

The city named their new operation the Grapevine Vintage Railroad (GVRR) with FRA reporting mark GVRX. Grapevine operated the train under trackage agreements with FWWR. When Trinity Metro began operating their TEXRail commuter line, GVRR made arrangements for trackage rights on their right-of-way to Haltom City. From that point on, GVRR uses FWWR trackage under the original agreement.

== Special Excursions ==
In addition to the normal Grapevine-Fort Worth and Trinity River runs, GVRR is responsible for many events and special excursions throughout the year.

=== North Pole Express ===
Considered the railroad's most popular event, the North Pole Express, runs every year late-November through December. The station and the train are both decorated for the occasion. For this out-and-back run, the train runs part of the way down the line from Grapevine until it gets to 'Reindeer Ridge', and then reverses back to Grapevine.

As riders board the train, they are given a souvenir ticket, and Santa's Elves pass out Frosty Chocolate Snow Milk in a souvenir mug. When the train gets to 'Reindeer Ridge', Mrs. Claus boards the train, and as the train heads back to Grapevine, each child is presented with a silver bell that says 'We Believe'. Back in Grapevine, riders get off the train and enter the North Pole, where they are greeted with a snowy forest path that leads them to Santa's Workshop. Once there, Santa, Mrs. Claus, and the elves perform a short musical, and afterwards guests are offered free pictures with Santa.

=== Day Out with Thomas ===
Although it is a short 25-30 minute trip, it is popular for families with small children. For one weekend each year, a replica of Thomas the Tank Engine comes to Grapevine and leads the train for a short out-and-back excursion. At the station, riders will find photo opportunities with Thomas and other characters from the show, as well as activities that vary from year to year. These activities can include but are not limited to the Thomas and Friends Imagination Station, magic shows, live performances, and storytelling.

=== Kiss Me I'm Irish Express ===
Another out-and-back excursion, this ride is offered one Saturday in March, and offers riders 21 and older a souvenir Kiss Me I'm Irish mug, two free glasses of beer, and Irish-style hors d'oeuvres and desserts.

=== Jazz Wine Train ===
On this out-and-back excursion in mid-March, riders 21 and older experience live jazz music in each coach. Guests receive meals and wine tastings provided by local Grapevine businesses, as well as bottled water and a souvenir wine glass.

=== Witches Brew Train ===
Another 21 and older out-and-back trip, this excursion offers guests Halloween-themed food and entertainment, as well as two free glasses of craft beer in a souvenir stein. Costumes are highly encouraged on this run but not required.

=== Trick 'r' Treat Trains ===
A Halloween themed excursion geared for the whole family.

=== Additional Seasonal Excursions ===
Although less popular, the Grapevine Vintage Railroad offers these themed excursions throughout the year: Christmas Wine Trains, After Christmas Trains, Spring Break Trains, Easter Bunny Train, Mother's Day Train, Memorial Day Train, Father's Day Train, Fourth of July Train, and Labor Day Train.

== Locomotives ==
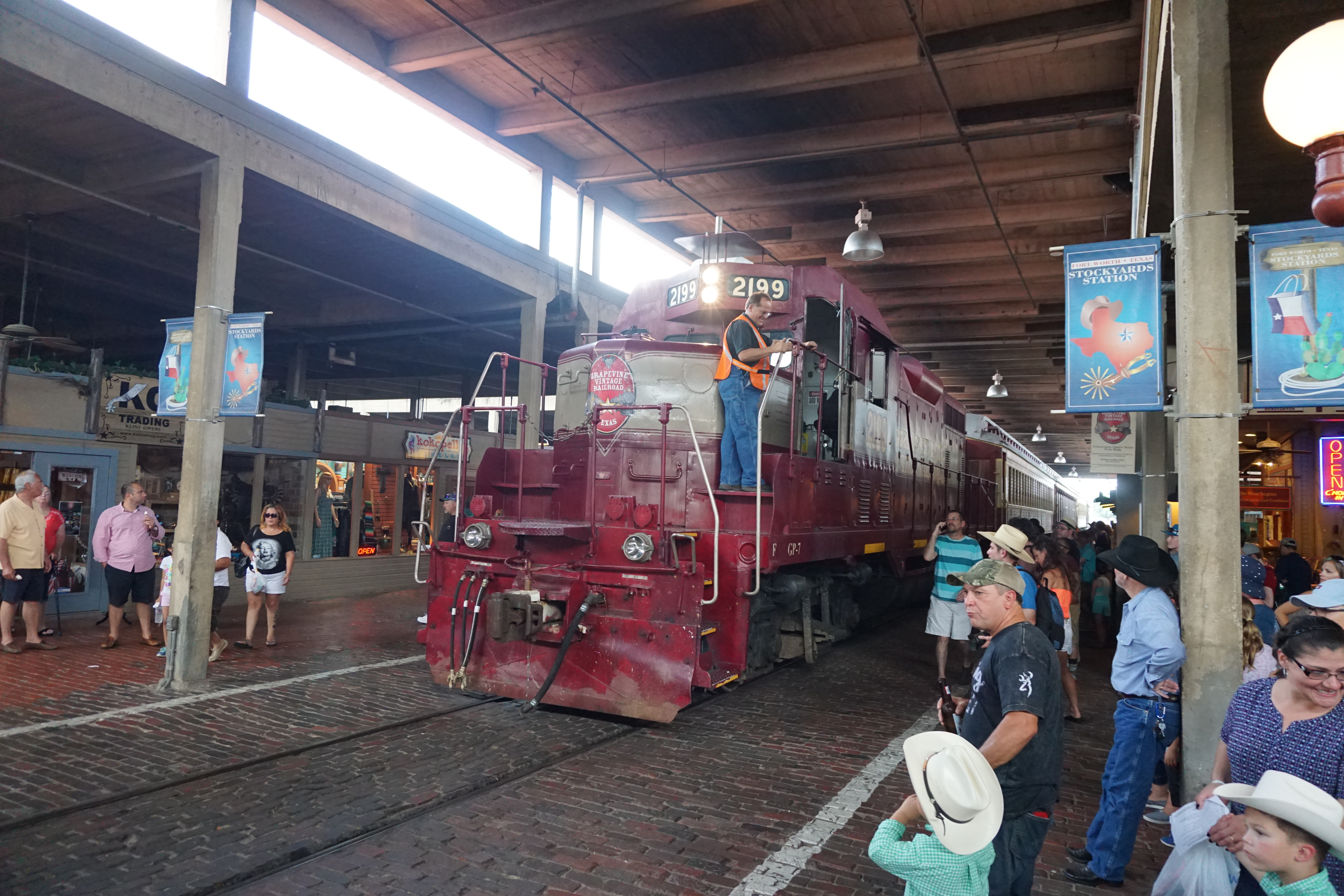
The "Vinny" locomotive at the Stockyards

=== #2199 'Vinny' ===
#2199, nicknamed Vinny, is a 1953 EMD GP7u diesel locomotive. Originally owned by the Atchison, Topeka, and Santa Fe Railroad, it was purchased by the Grapevine Vintage Railroad in 2005. Vinny is the most used locomotive on the line while 2248 is down for repair.

=== #2248 'Puffy' ===
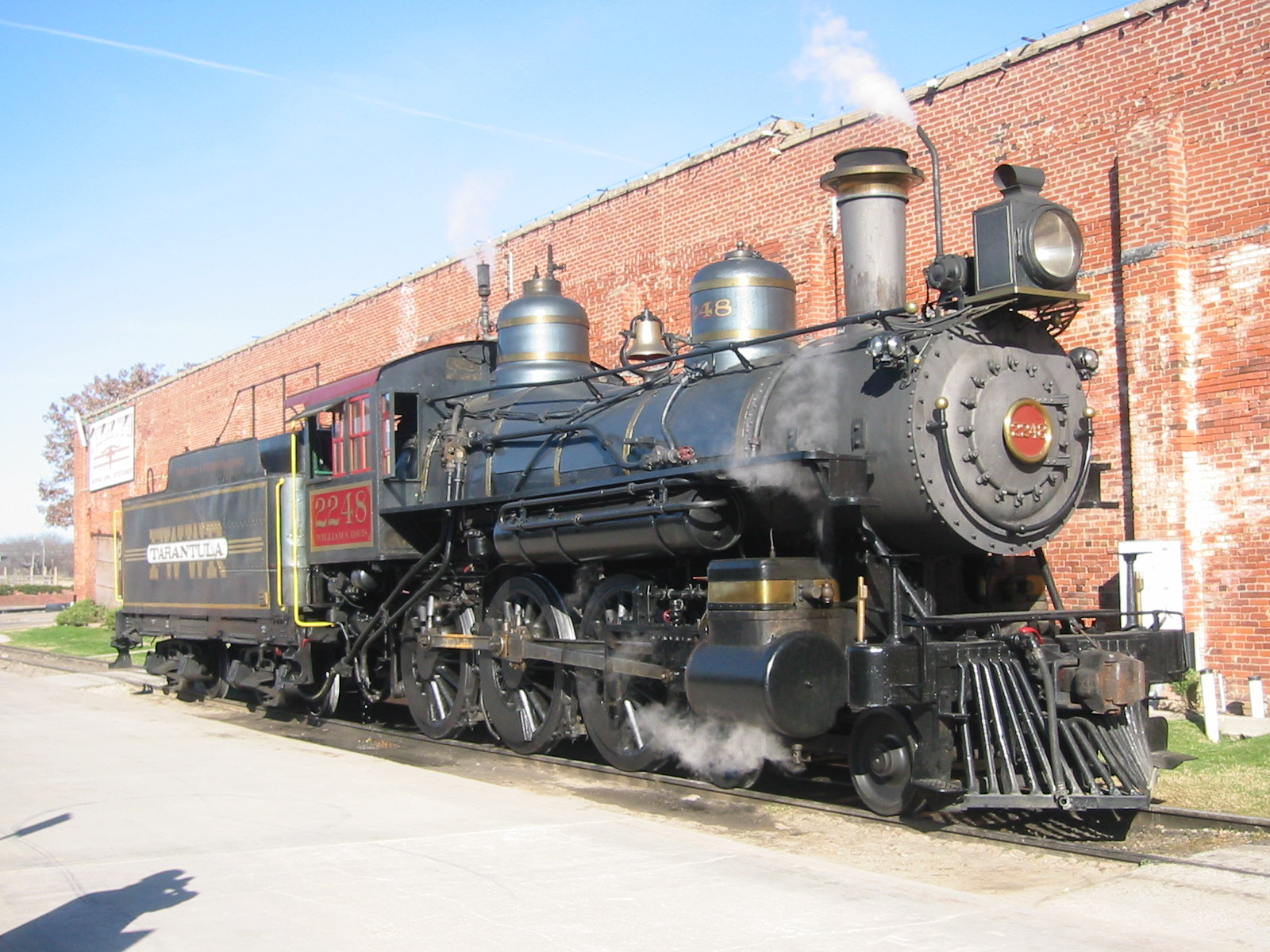
The "Puffy" locomotive at the Stockyards displaying the old Tarantula branding

Built by Cooke Locomotive Works in 1896, 2248, nicknamed Puffy, is the railroad's 4-6-0 steam locomotive. It was originally owned by the Southern Pacific Railroad for mixed passenger and freight use in California. Later in its life, it was converted into a fire train, and eventually ended up as a ceremonial engine in a private collection. Although at one point Walt Disney was eyeing it for a project that never came to be, it ended up in the hands of the Texas State Railroad in 1976. In 1990, #2248 was purchased by the FWWR and restored to operational condition in 1991. In early 2016, the 2248 was taken out of service to undergo a major overhaul. The overhaul was completed in August 2026 and returned to service soon after.

=== #2014 and #2016 ===
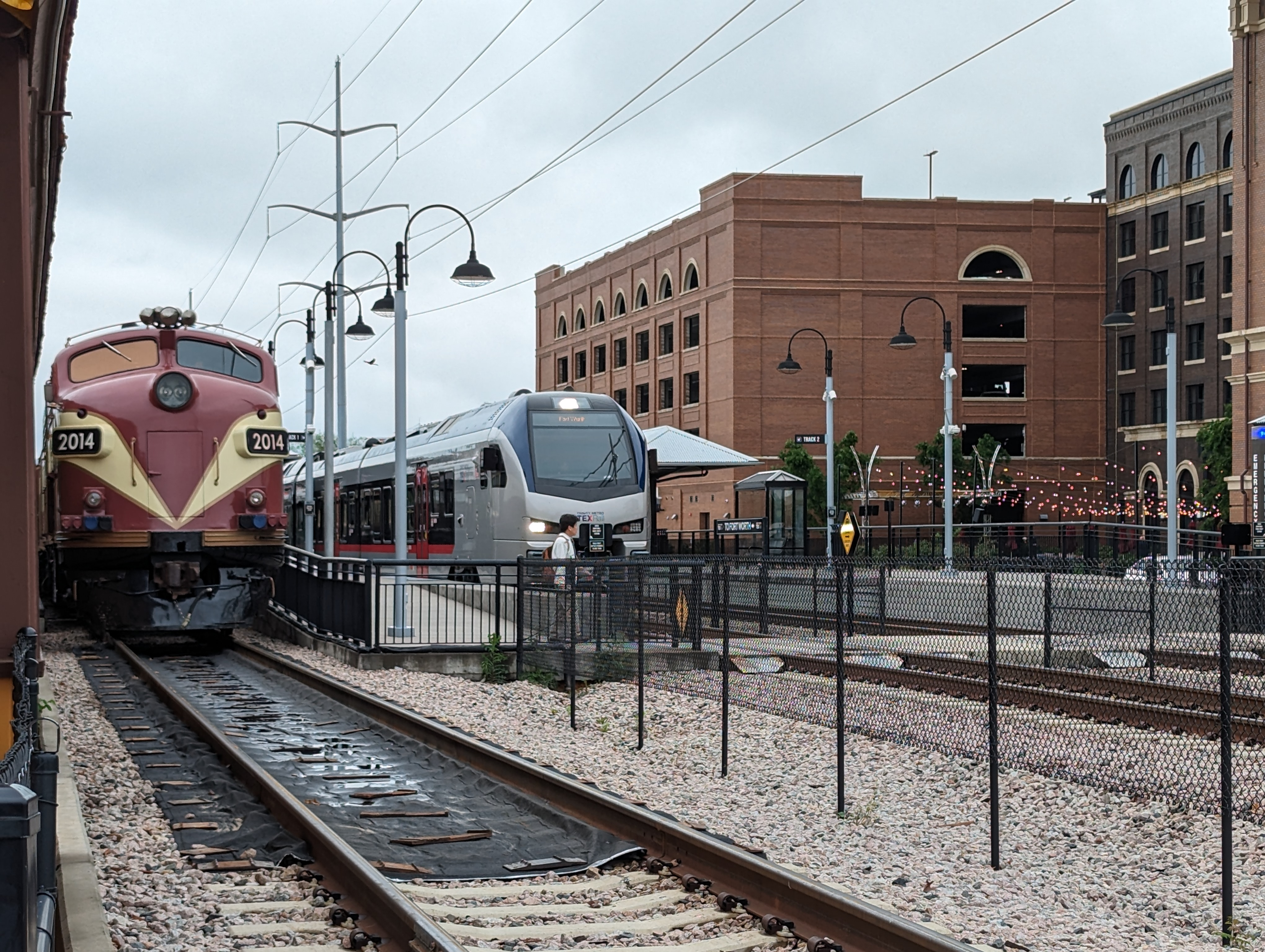
GVRR 2014 rests at Grapevine/Main Street station in 2024

#2014 and #2016 are two EMD FL9 diesel locomotives. They were originally owned by the New Haven Railroad, numbered 2041 and 2044, respectively. They were transferred to ConnDOT/MTA Metro-North Railroad for commuter service between New York City and New Haven, Connecticut, when the New Haven Railroad was absorbed into Conrail. They remained under ConnDOT ownership until they were placed for sale, when the FL9 locomotives were purchased by GVRR.
