= Grapevine/Main Street station =

Train station in Grapevine, Texas

Grapevine/Main Street
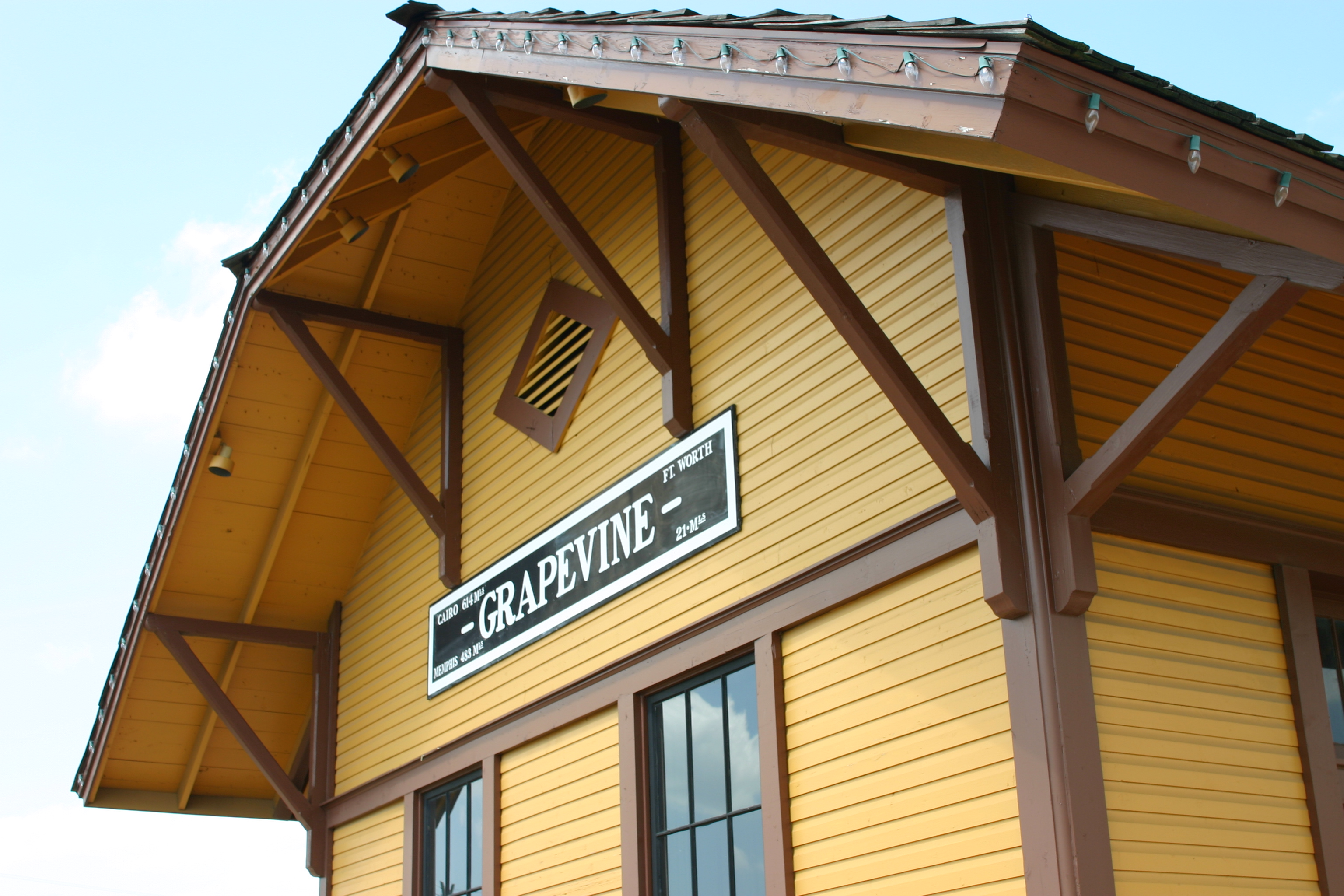
- The historic depot at the station

General information
- Location: 815 S Main St, Grapevine, Texas 76051
- Coordinates: 32°56′00″N 97°04′38″W
- Owner: City of Grapevine
- Platforms: 2 side platforms (TEXRail) and 1 bay platform (Grapevine Vintage Railroad)

Construction
- Structure type: At-grade
- Parking: 175 spaces
- Accessible: Yes

History
- Opened: 1888 (depot); December 31, 2018 (TEXRail preview service); January 10, 2019 (revenue service)

Services
Preceding station	Trinity Metro	Following station
North Richland Hills/Smithfield toward T&P Station	TEXRail	DFW Airport North toward DFW Airport Terminal B
Preceding station	Grapevine Vintage Railroad	Following station
Fort Worth Stockyards Terminus	Grapevine Vintage Railroad	Terminus
Former services
Preceding station	St. Louis Southwestern Railway	Following station
Smithfield toward Fort Worth	Fort Worth local	Coppell toward Addison
Location

Grapevine/Main Street station, also known as Main Street Depot, is a train station in Grapevine, Texas. The station is currently served by the TEXRail commuter rail line and the Grapevine Vintage Railroad.

== Services ==
=== TEXRail ===
The Grapevine/Main Street station was an opening day station when revenue service began on January 10, 2019. The mayor of Grapevine remarked that he wanted the station to look like Fort Worth Central Station, another station on the TEXRail route that currently serves Amtrak trains and the Trinity Railway Express commuter rail line.

=== Grapevine Vintage Railroad ===
The Grapevine Vintage Railroad (GVRR) calls at a historic platform at Grapevine/Main Street station directly adjacent to the TEXRail platforms before continuing along the 21-mile (34 kilometer) Cotton Belt Corridor through to the Fort Worth Stockyards.

== Gallery ==
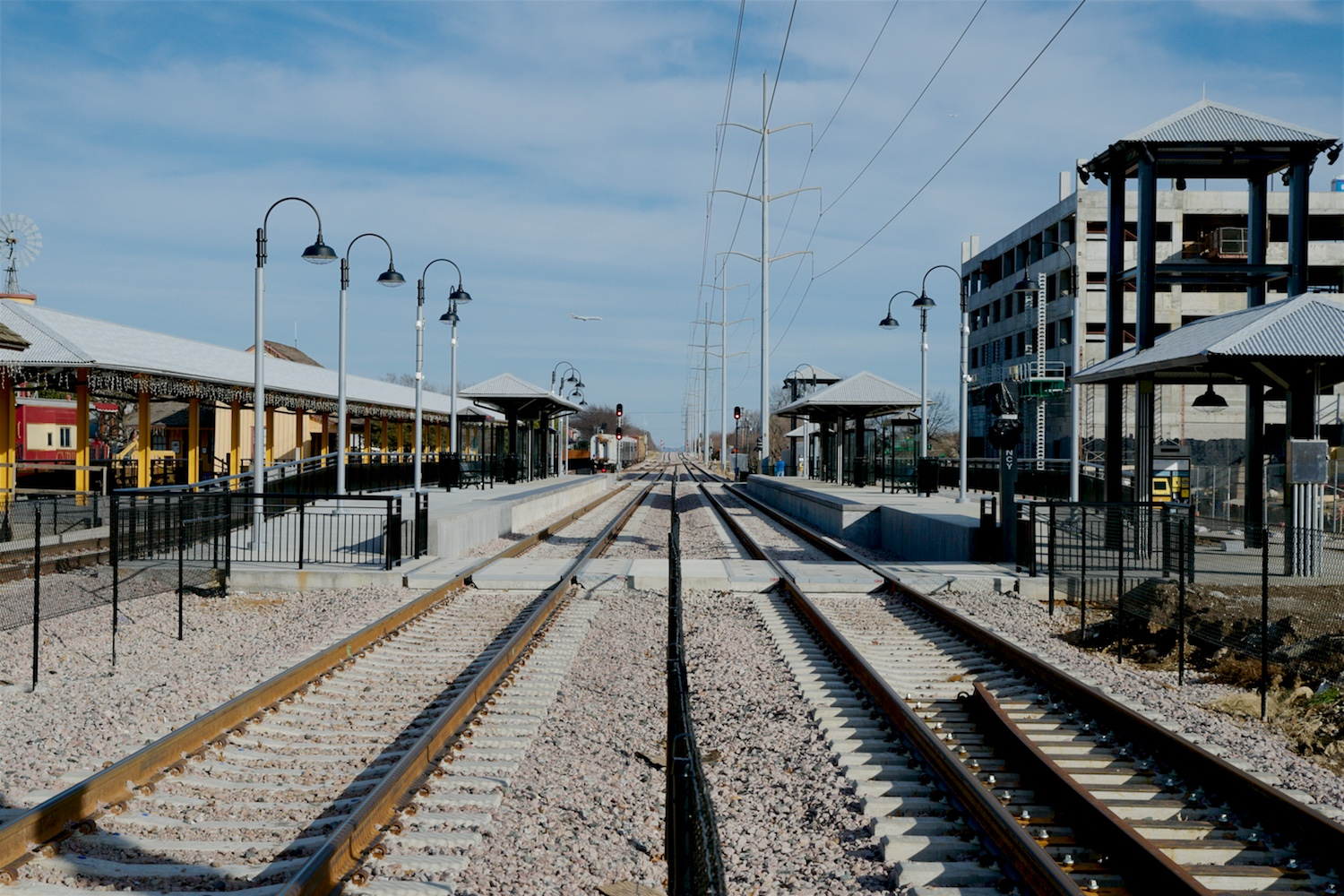
View of the TEXRail station from the tracks

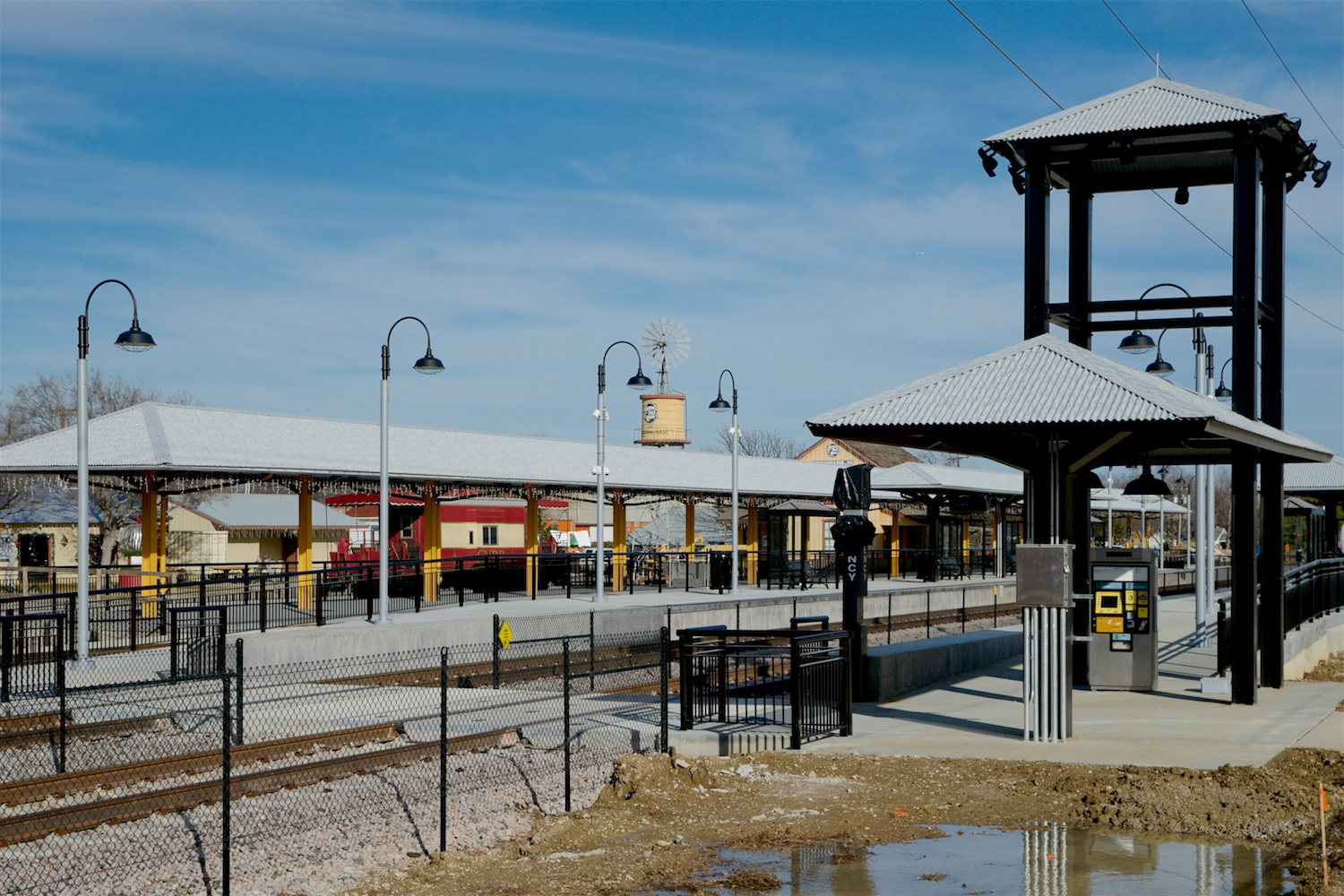
View of the TEXRail station from a grade crossing

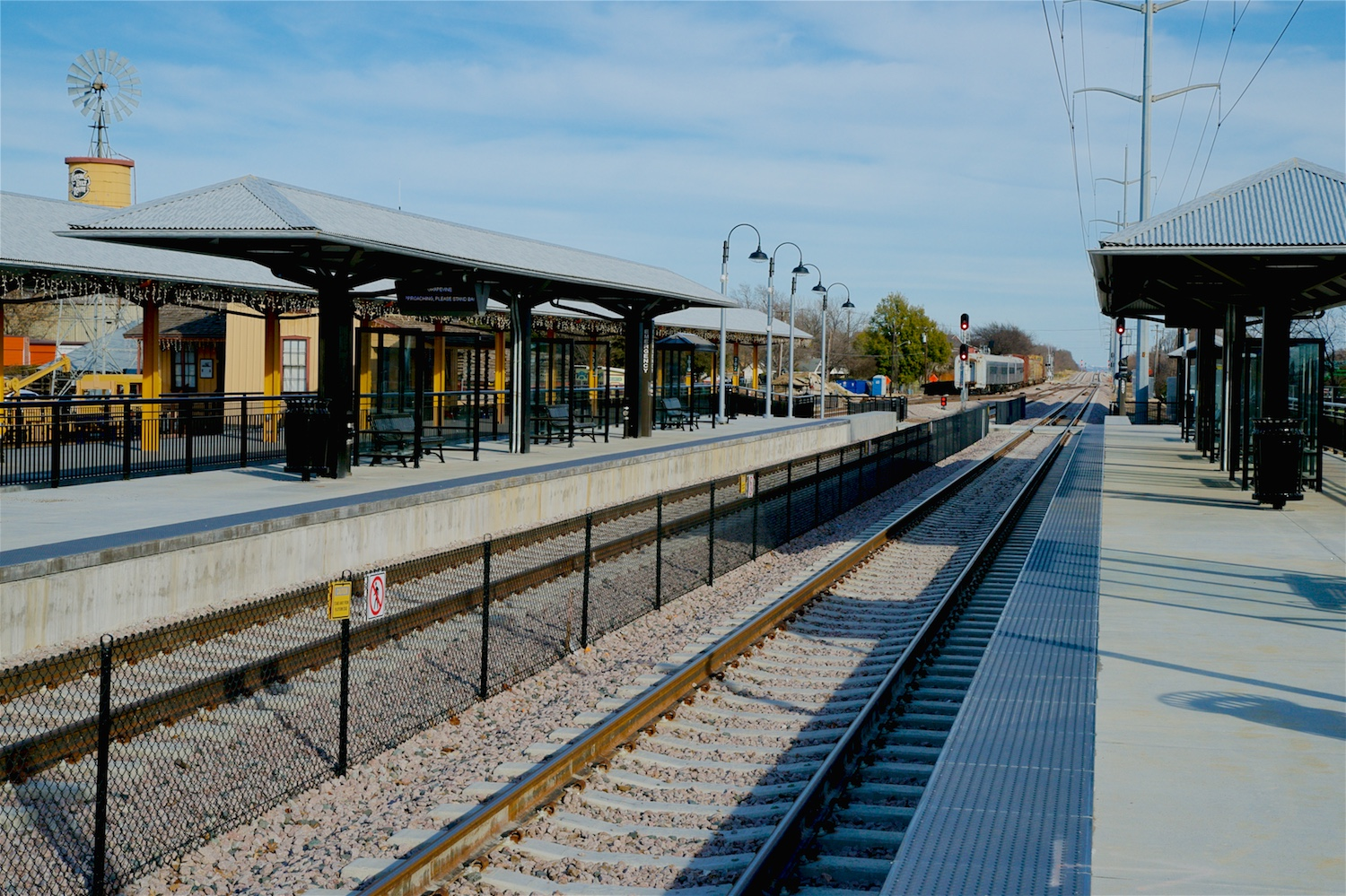
View of the TEXRail station from the platforms

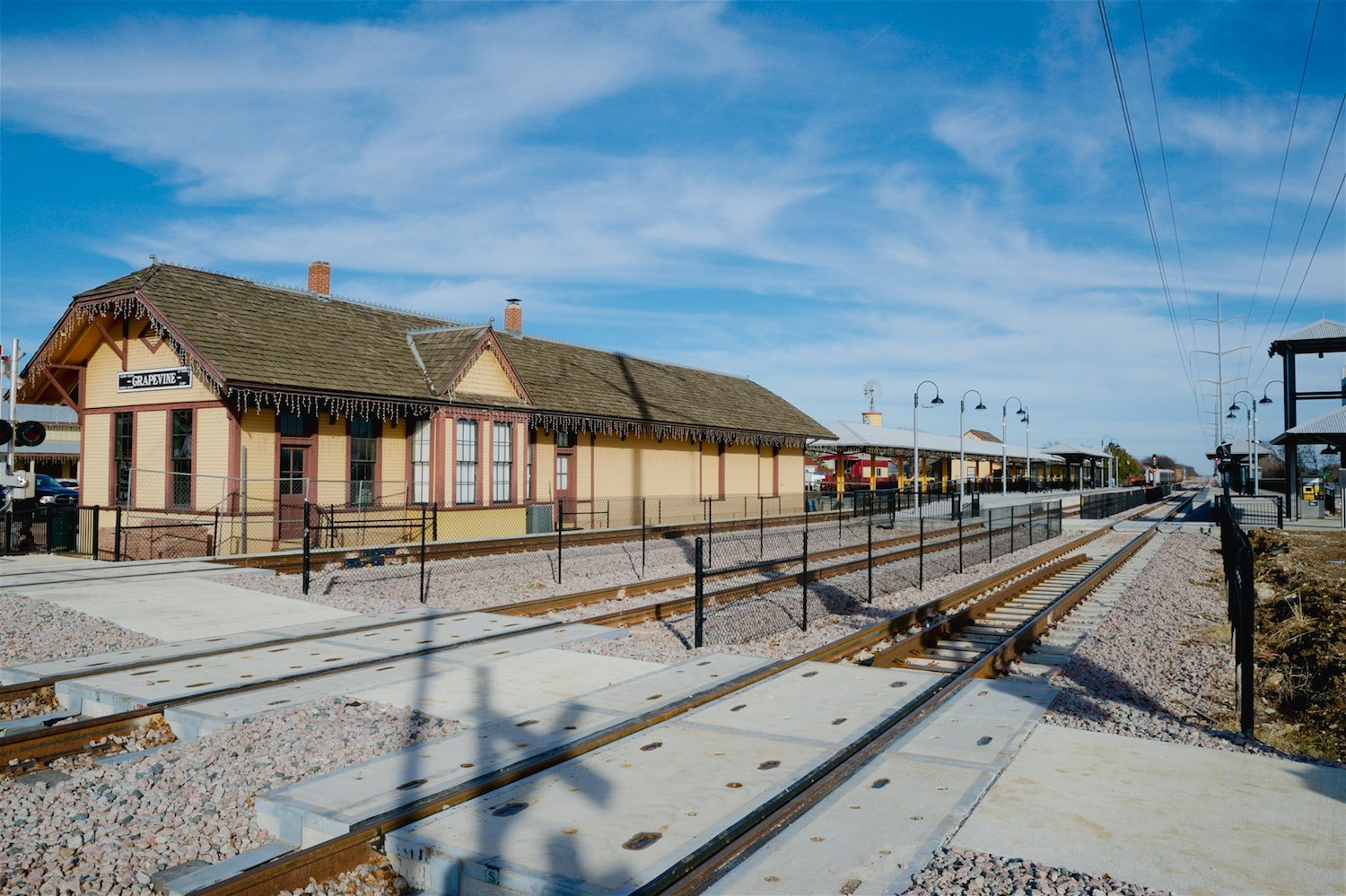
View of the historic station
