= Thannisch Block Building =

- Recorded Texas Historic Landmark
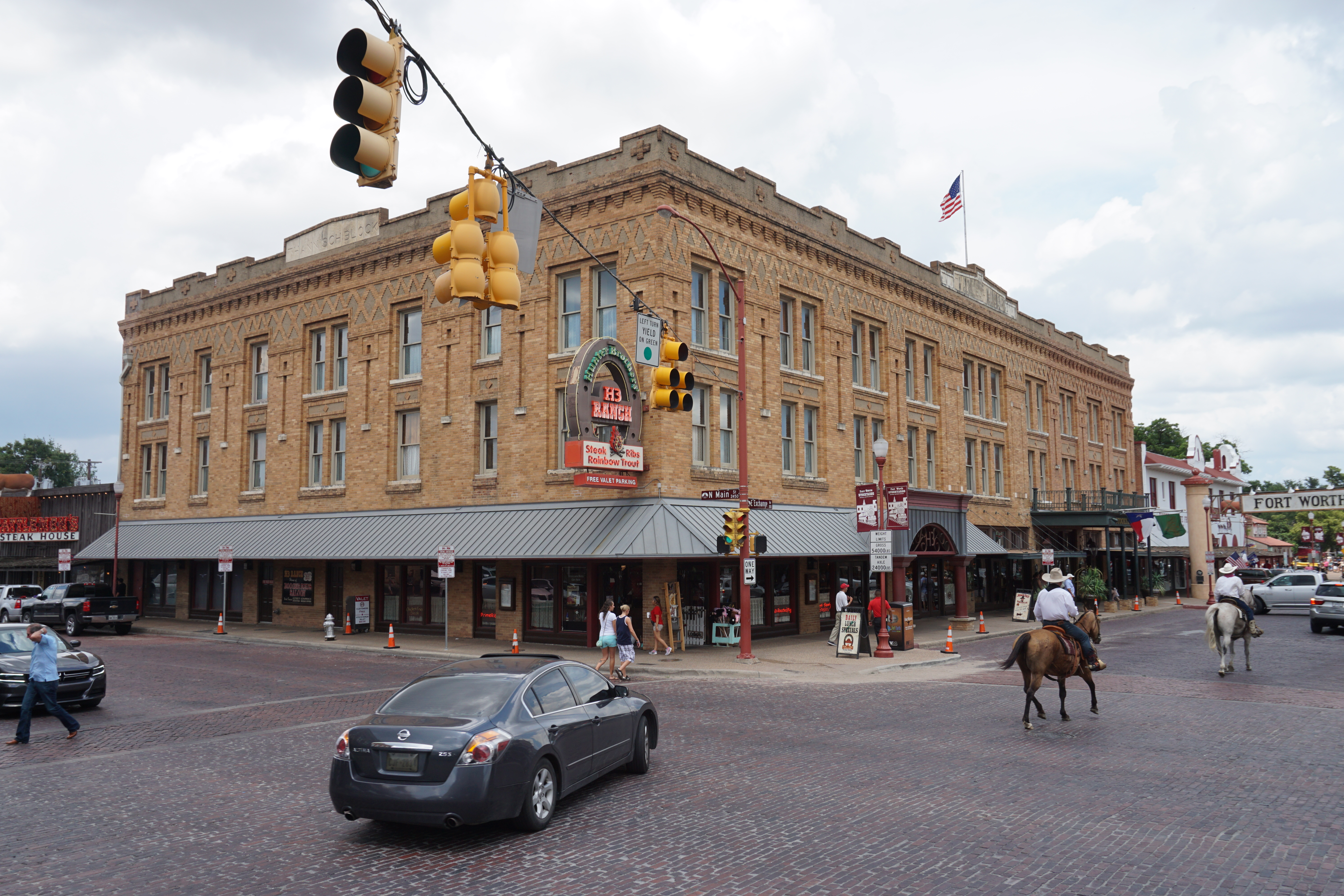
- Thannisch Block in 2016.

- Location within Texas
- Location: E. Exchange Avenue, Fort Worth, Texas
- Coordinates: 32°47′19.97″N 97°20′54.89″W
- Architect: E. Stanley Field and Wiley G. Clarkson
- Architectural style: Early Commercial architecture
- Website: stockyardshotel.com
- Part of: Fort Worth Stockyards
- RTHL No.: 5278
- Added to NRHP: 1984

The Thannisch Block Building, operating as the Stockyards Hotel, is a historic hotel in the Fort Worth Stockyards.

== Description ==
The building's exterior is patterned ochre brick, with a steeped parapet and cast stone trim. In the Stockyards Hotel, the interior decor is based on the Old West. Its 52 rooms are decorated in four different themes, cowboy, mountain man, Victorian and Native American. Many of its suites are named after famous figures from Old West history and lore, including Bonnie and Clyde, Butch Cassidy, Geronimo and Davy Crockett. The Bonnie and Clyde suite was where outlaws Clyde Barrow and Bonnie Parker stayed in 1933 during their crime spree.

Its celebrity suite has accommodated guests like George Strait, Willie Nelson, Tanya Tucker, and Chuck Norris. The hotel staff reportedly filled the suite's jacuzzi with champagne for some of these guests on request.

Booger Red's Saloon and H3 Ranch Steak House are also located in the Thannisch Block.

== History ==
The building was built by Colonel Thomas M. Thannisch. In 1904, he bought a plot on the corner of Main Street and Exchange Avenue and built the Stockyards Club and Saloon, a wooden-frame hotel and bar. He bought two more lots to the east of the building and hired contractor C.E. Brown to build a three-story building called the Thannisch Block at 109 E. Exchange Avenue. The block's first floor included a bar and other businesses including a physician's office, while the second and third floors were used by the hotel. It opened in 1907.

In 1913, Thannisch demolished the original building on Main Street, and expanded the Thannisch Block. The architects behind this expansion were E. Stanley Field and Wiley G. Clarkson. The expanded building included an 86 room hotel and a larger commercial center. It was subsequently called the Chandler Hotel, after manager Robert L. Chandler. It later operated as Planters Hotel (1924), Stock Yards Hotel (1925-1949), and Right Hotel (1950-1981).

Many of the hotel's guests were ranchers and businessmen associated with the nearby stockyards. The declining importance of the livestock markets caused the Stockyards neighborhood to decline, and by the 1970s the hotel had become a flophouse. In 1981, the hotel was closed due to health code violations.

Two businessmen, Tom Yater and Marshall Young, purchased the hotel from Thannisch's descendants in 1982, and began restoring it. Architect Ward Bogard was in charge of the project, while Kay Howard redesigned the interior. In 1984, it reopened as the Stockyards Hotel. The reopened building had 52 rooms, a restaurant, a bar, and shops. That year, it was recorded as a Recorded Texas Historic Landmark. It is a part of the Fort Worth Stockyards National Register Historic District. After its reopening, it became an exclusive hotel.

Reported hauntings at the hotel have been a subject of local lore.

In 2022, the hotel was acquired by Hotel Drover.
