= Fort Worth and Western Railroad =

Railway line in Texas, United States

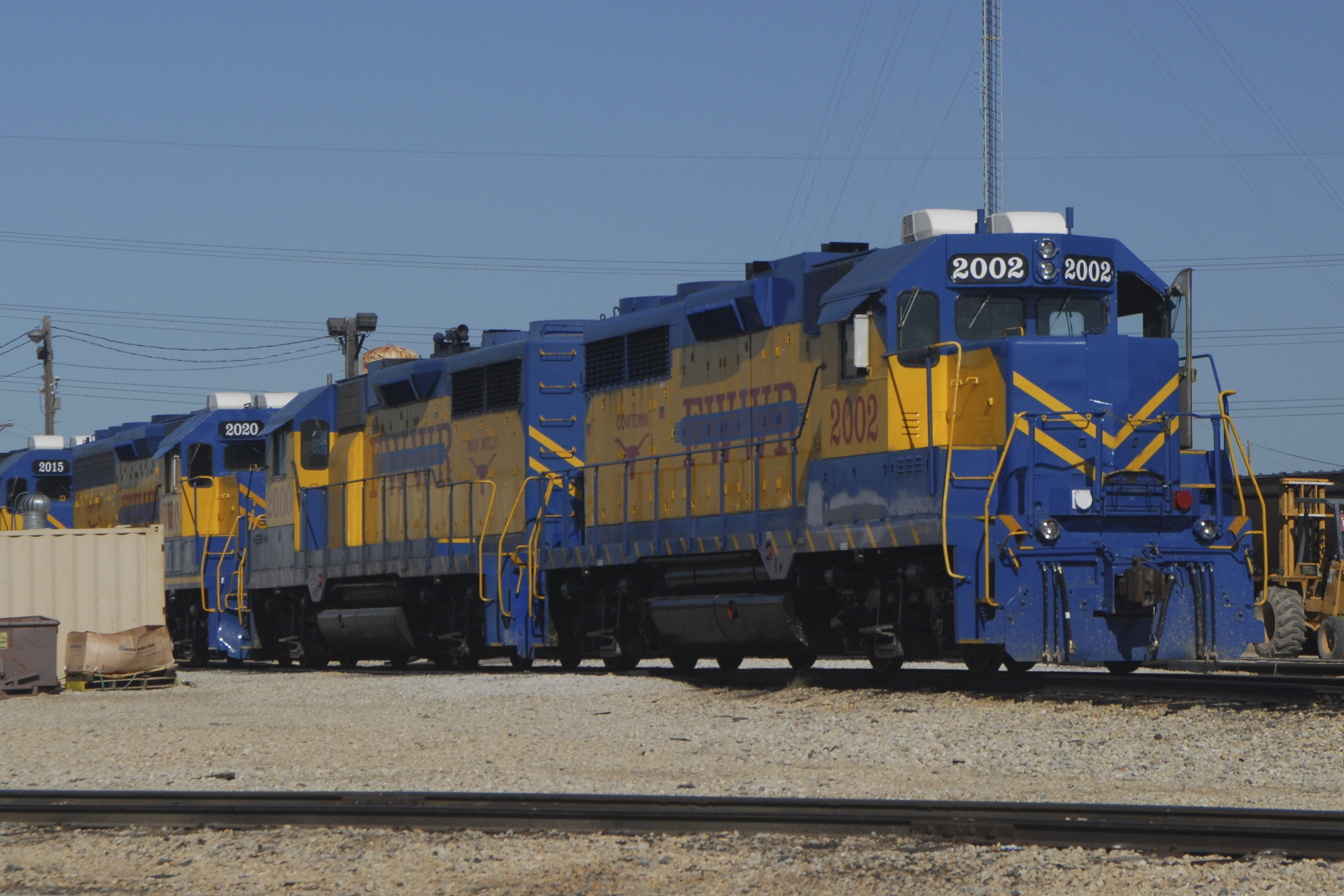

Overview
- Headquarters: Fort Worth, Texas
- Reporting mark: FWWR
- Locale: West Central Texas
- Dates of operation: 1988–present

Technical
- Track gauge: 4 ft 8 1/2 in (1,435 mm) standard gauge

The Fort Worth and Western Railroad (reporting mark FWWR) is a Class III short-line railroad headquartered in Fort Worth, Texas. Operating only within the state of Texas, its main freight service route is between Carrollton, Fort Worth and Brownwood.

== History ==
Much of the company's route originally belonged to the Fort Worth and Rio Grande Railway (FW&RG), which began construction from Fort Worth in 1886 and reached Brownwood in 1891. In 1901, the FW&RG was bought by the St. Louis–San Francisco Railway (the Frisco), which sold it to the Atchison, Topeka and Santa Fe Railway (Santa Fe) in 1937. The Santa Fe sold the line to an affiliate of the South Orient Railroad in 1994.

The FWWR began operations in 1988, with 6.25 miles (10.06 km) of track that it had bought from the Burlington Northern Railroad. By the mid-1990s, the railroad operated 10.75 miles (17.30 km) of track, the result of numerous minor acquisitions. In 1996, the FWWR more than doubled its total trackage with the lease of a 28.5 miles (45.9 km) route from Dallas Area Rapid Transit, and in 1998 purchased 134 miles (216 km) of track from South Orient Railroad, now Texas Pacifico Transportation. The FWWR leased two Union Pacific Railroad properties, a yard and branch line, in 2002 and 2003 respectively.

== Route ==
The FWWR operates 276 miles (444 km) of track between Carro and Ricker, Texas, with branch lines from Dublin to Gorman and from Cresson to Cleburne, as well as trackage rights in the Fort Worth area and between Ricker and San Angelo Junction, Texas. Since 2007, the railroad has been in the process of resurfacing its trackage, as well as installing new sidings and upgrading the route, eventually to allow 40 mph (64 km/h) speeds over the entire line.

== Company ==
On December 27, 2010, Fort Worth and Western named Thomas Schlosser as president and CEO. He took over from Steven George, who had held the position since 2000. On August 19, 2015, Kevin Erasmus became president and CEO. The company's vice president and COO is Richard Green. The company employs around 85 people.

== Fleet ==
As of July 2023, the Fort Worth and Western's locomotive fleet (past and present) consists of the following:

Number	Type	History	Nickname
1008, 1009, 1010	GE AC4400CW		
2000	EMD GP38-3		Miss Molly
2001	EMD GP38-3		Niles City
2002	EMD GP38-3		Cowtown
2003	EMD GP38-3		General Worth
2004	EMD GP38-3		Comanche
2005	EMD GP38-3		Maj. Ripley Arnold
2006	EMD GP38-3		General Tarrant
2007	EMD GP38-3		B.B. Paddock
2008	EMD GP50		Panther City
2009	EMD GP50		Chisolm Trail
2010, 2011	EMD GP50		Miss Etta
2012	EMD GP50		Chaparral
2016	EMD SD40-2		Sundance Kid
2017	EMD SD40-2		Kid Curry
2019	EMD GP38-2		Apache
2020	EMD GP40-2		
2021, 2022	EMD GP40-2		
2023, 2024, 2025, 2026, 2027, 2028, 2029, 2030, 2031, 2032	EMD SD40-2		
2036	EMD SD60M		Tarantula
2037	EMD SD60M		Longhorn
2038	EMD SD60M		Mustang
2039	EMD GP60		Cleburne

=== Former units ===
Number	Type	History	Nickname
103	EMD GP7	Ex-Conrail, nee-Penn Central, nee-NYC; retired	
104	EMD F7A	Ex-B&LE; retired	Texas Southern
2013 (Rebuilt from 103)	NRE 2GS14B		Luke Short
2014 (Rebuilt from 2785)	NRE 2GS14B		Timothy Courtright
2015	EMD SD40-2		Butch Cassidy
2018	EMD SD40-2		Tarantula
5004, 5007, 5020	GMDD GP35	Ex-CPR	
Units belonging to the Grapevine Vintage Railroad
2199 (GVRX)	EMD GP7		Vinny
2248 (GVRX)	Cooke Locomotive Works 4-6-0		Puffy
