= Fort Worth Stockyards =

- Fort Worth Stockyards Historic District
- U.S. National Register of Historic Places
- U.S. Historic district
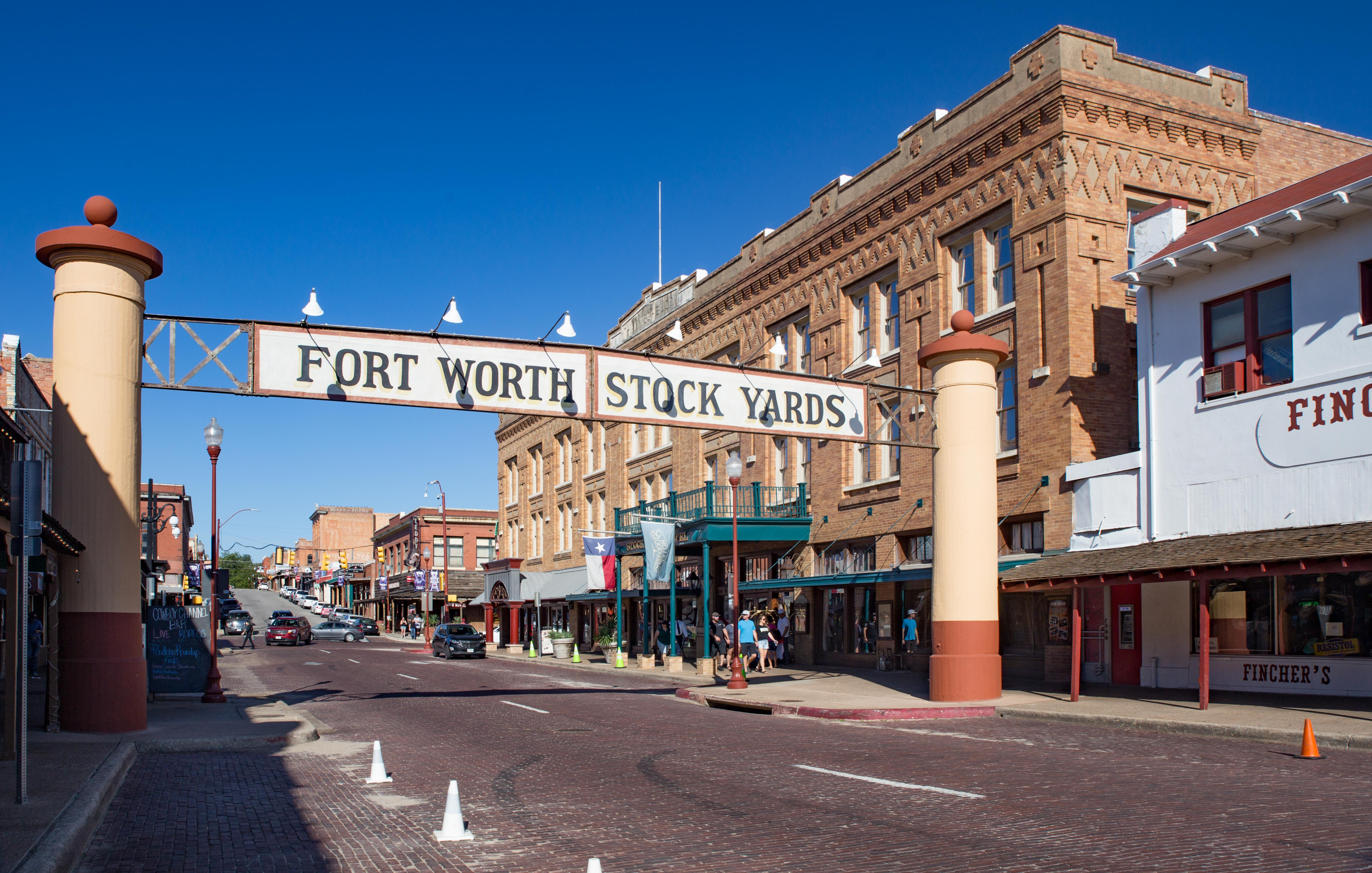
- Entrance to Fort Worth Stockyards, 2022

- Location within Texas Location within the United States
- Location: Roughly bounded by 23rd, Houston, and 28th Sts., and railroad, Fort Worth, Texas
- Coordinates: 32°47′25″N 97°20′46″W
- Area: 98 acres (40 ha)
- Architectural style: Mission/Spanish Revival
- Website: Fort Worth Stockyards National Historic District
- NRHP reference No.: 76002067
- Added to NRHP: June 29, 1976

The Fort Worth Stockyards is a historic district that is located in Fort Worth, Texas, United States, north of the central business district. A 98-acre (40 ha) portion encompassing much of the district was listed on the National Register of Historic Places as Fort Worth Stockyards Historic District in 1976. It holds a former livestock market which operated under various owners from 1866.

== History ==
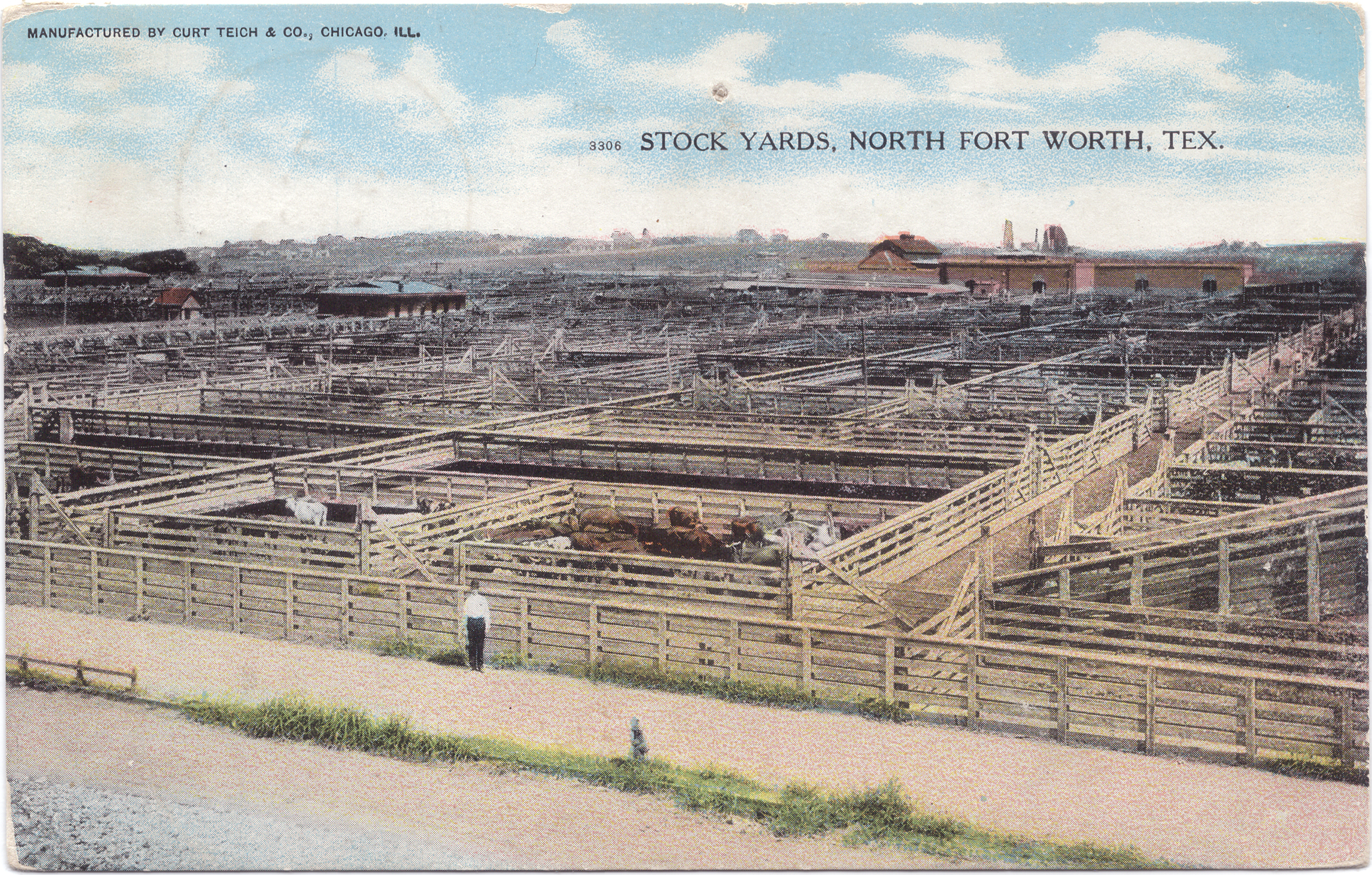
Stock yards, north Fort Worth, Texas (postcard, c. 1900s)

The arrival of railroads in 1876 made the area a very important livestock center. Fort Worth Union Stockyards opened for business on January 19, 1890, covering 206 acres. On February 7, the Fort Worth Dressed Meat and Packing Company was founded. This facility was operated without profit until purchased by G. W. Simpson of Boston. In an effort to produce revenue, they reached out to the Swift and Armour companies to establish packing houses. By 1886, four stockyards had been built near the railroads. Boston capitalist Greenleif W. Simpson, with a half dozen Boston and Chicago associates, incorporated the Fort Worth Stock Yards Company on March 23, 1893, and purchased the Union Stock Yards and the Fort Worth Packing Company. The Stockyards experienced early success. By 1907, the Stockyards sold a million cattle per year. The stockyards was an organized place where cattle, sheep, and hogs could be bought, sold and slaughtered. Fort Worth remained an important part of the cattle industry until the 1950s. Business suffered due to livestock auctions held closer to where the livestock were originally produced.

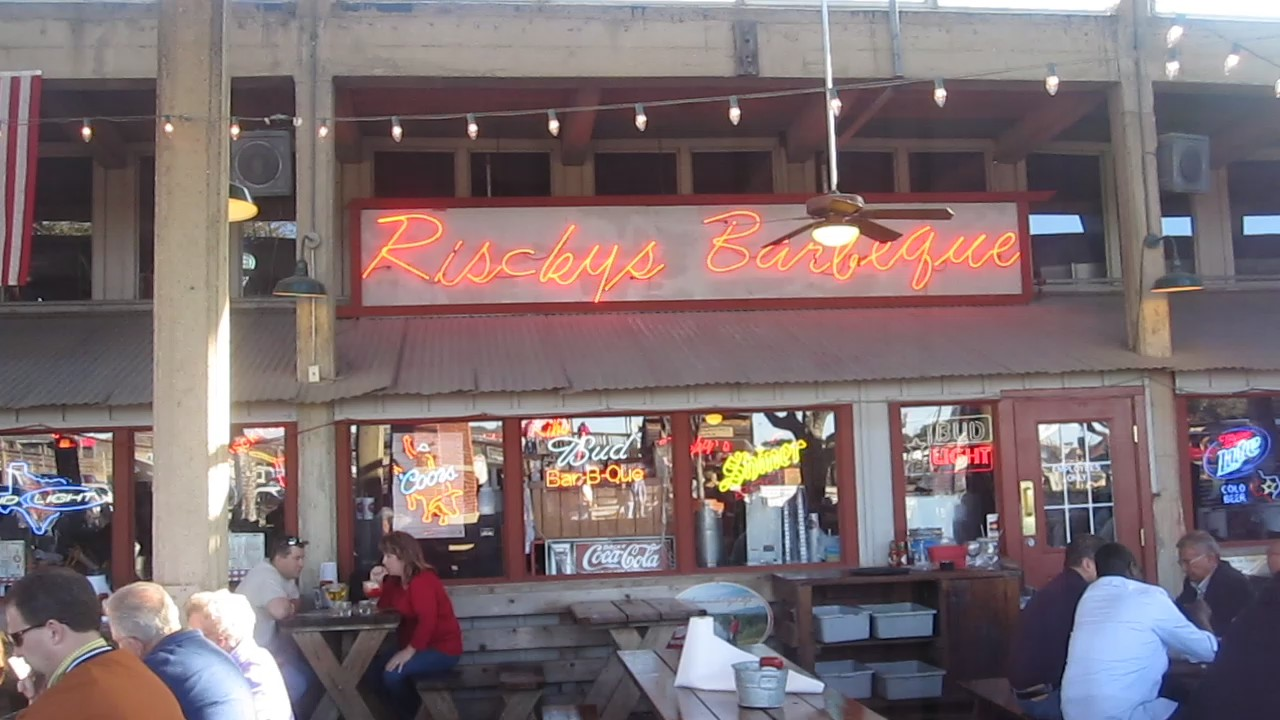
Riscky's Barbeque and a separate Riscky's Steakhouse are located in the Fort Worth Stockyards

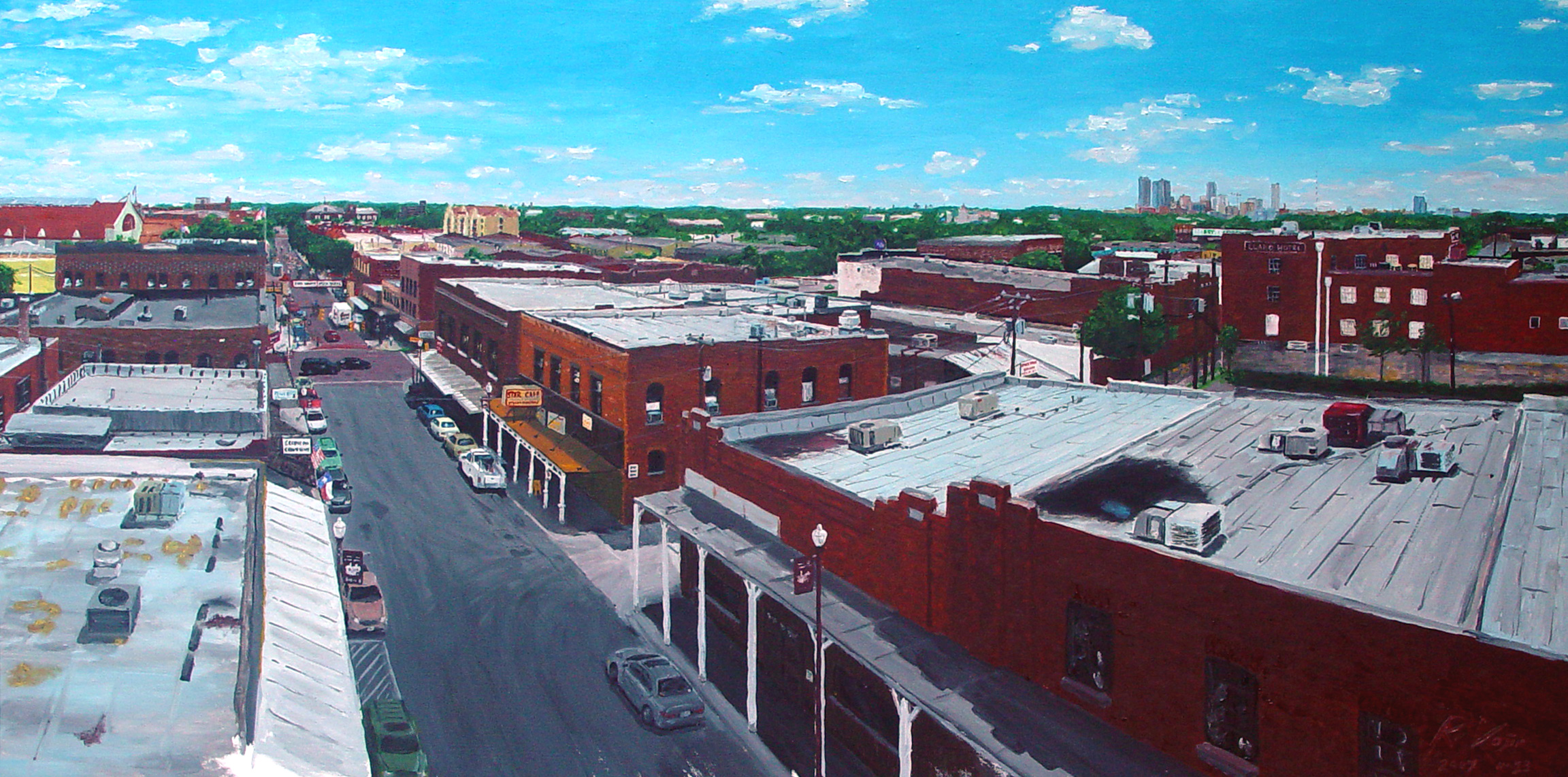
Fort Worth Stockyards and Skyline, 2007 painting by R. Vojir

The Fort Worth Stockyards was listed on the National Register as a historical district in 1976. The listing included 46 contributing buildings and one other contributing structure. Recorded Texas Historic Landmarks within the district include the entrance sign, the Livestock Exchange Building, and the Thannisch Block Building housing the Stockyards Hotel. State Antiquities Landmarks also include the entrance sign as well as the Armour & Swift Plaza and the Cowtown Coliseum.

The Stockyards consist of mainly entertainment and shopping venues that capitalize on the "Cowtown" image of Fort Worth. Home to the famous boot making company M.L. Leddy's which is located in the heart of the Stockyards and The Maverick Fine Western Wear and Saloon where customers "can 'belly up' to the bar, relax and have a cold beer while in the Stockyards; just like they did in the days of the big cattle drives", as they shop around the store. The city of Fort Worth is often referred to as "Where the West Begins." Many bars and nightclubs (including Billy Bob's Texas) are located in the vicinity, and the area has a Western motif. There is also an opry and the weekend rodeos at Cowtown Coliseum. Some volunteers still run the cattle drives through the stockyards, a practice developed in the late 19th century by the frontiersman Charles "Buffalo" Jones, who herded buffalo calves through the streets of Garden City, Kansas.

A reenactment of a 19th-century cattle drive took place in 1999 as part of the city's sesquicentennial celebration. Weather permitting, drives continue to be held twice daily except on certain holidays.

| Preceding station | Grapevine Vintage Railroad | Following station |
|---|---|---|
| Terminus | Grapevine Vintage Railroad | Main Street Depot Terminus |

== Gallery ==
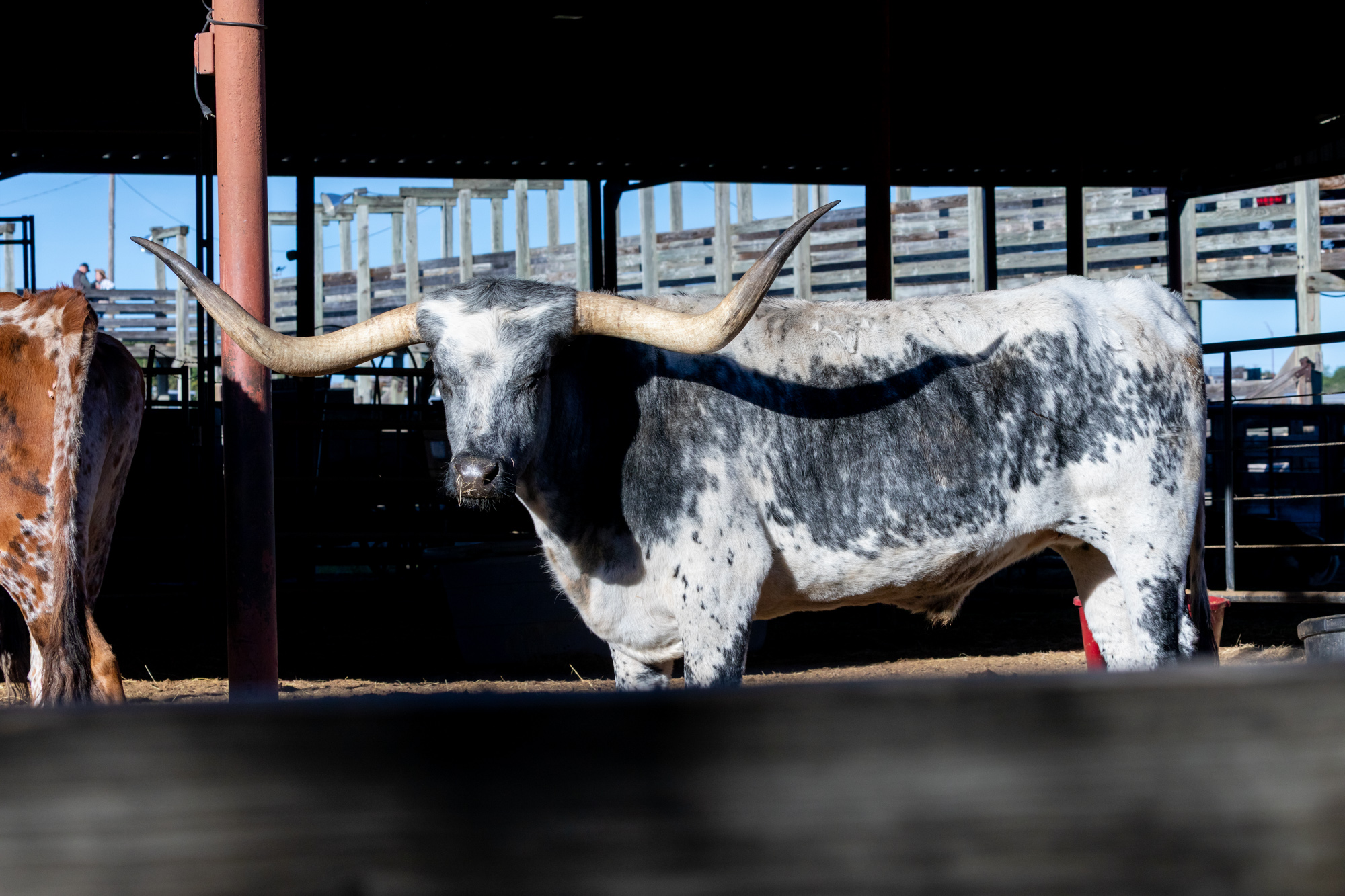
Longhorn cattle in the Fort Worth Stockyards

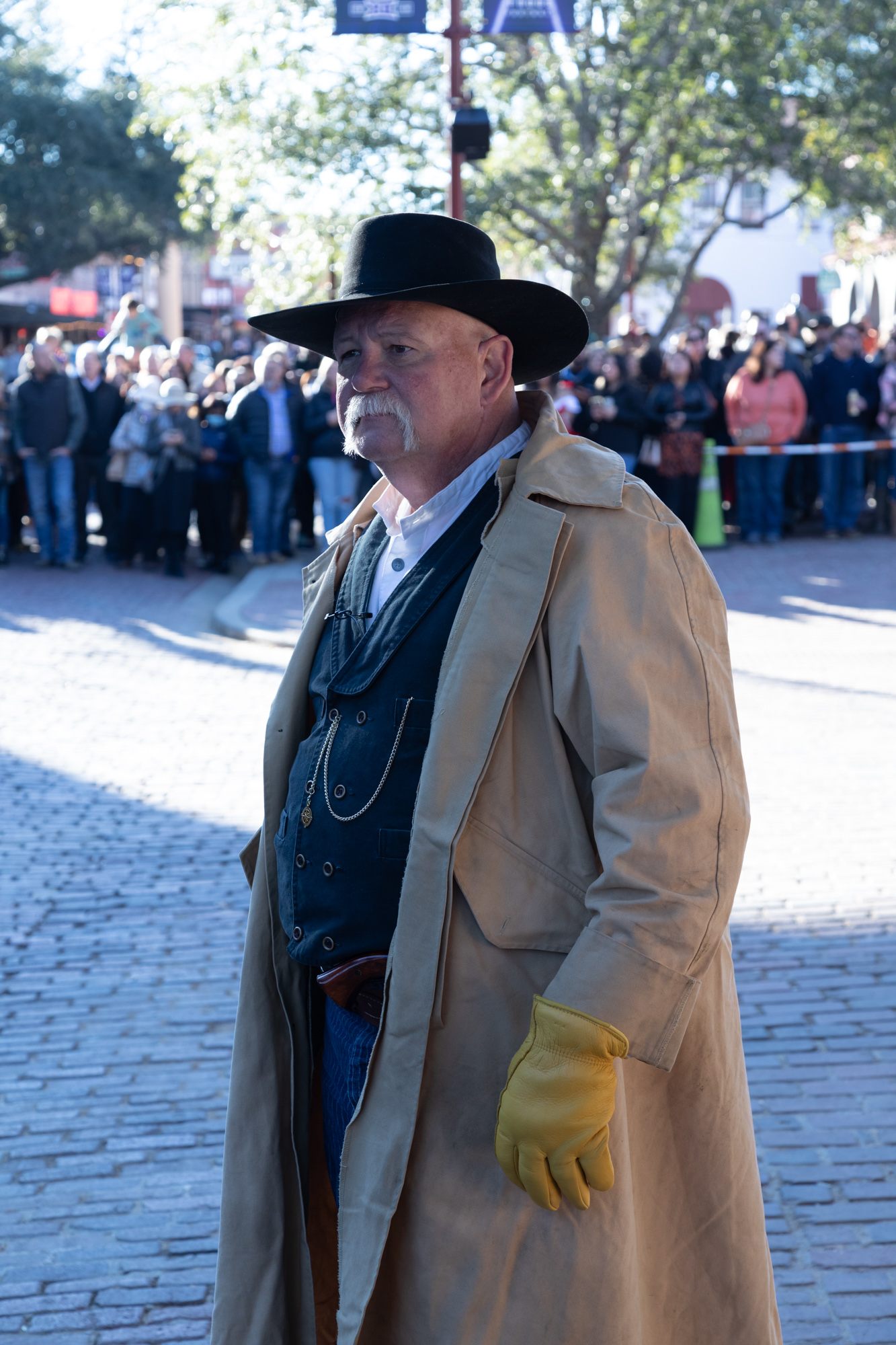
Longhorn cattle rancher in the Fort Worth Stockyards

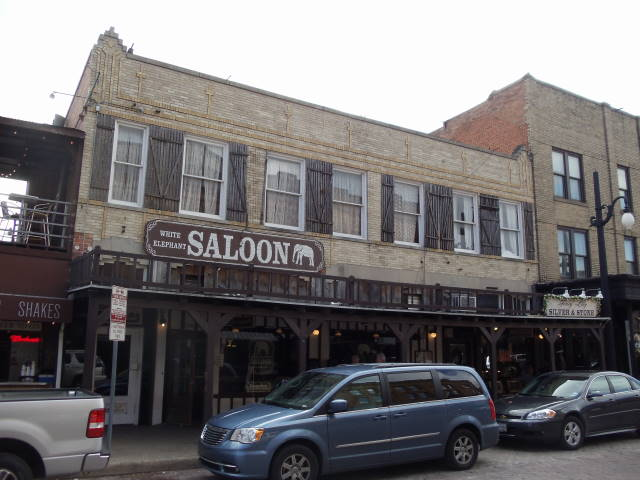
White Elephant Saloon

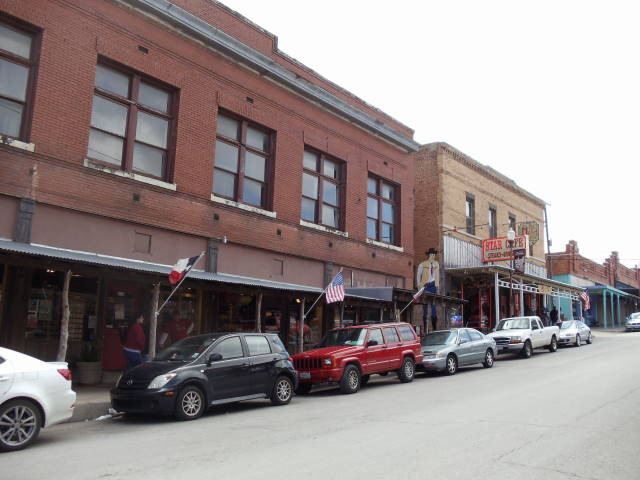
General Store and Trading Post, Star Café

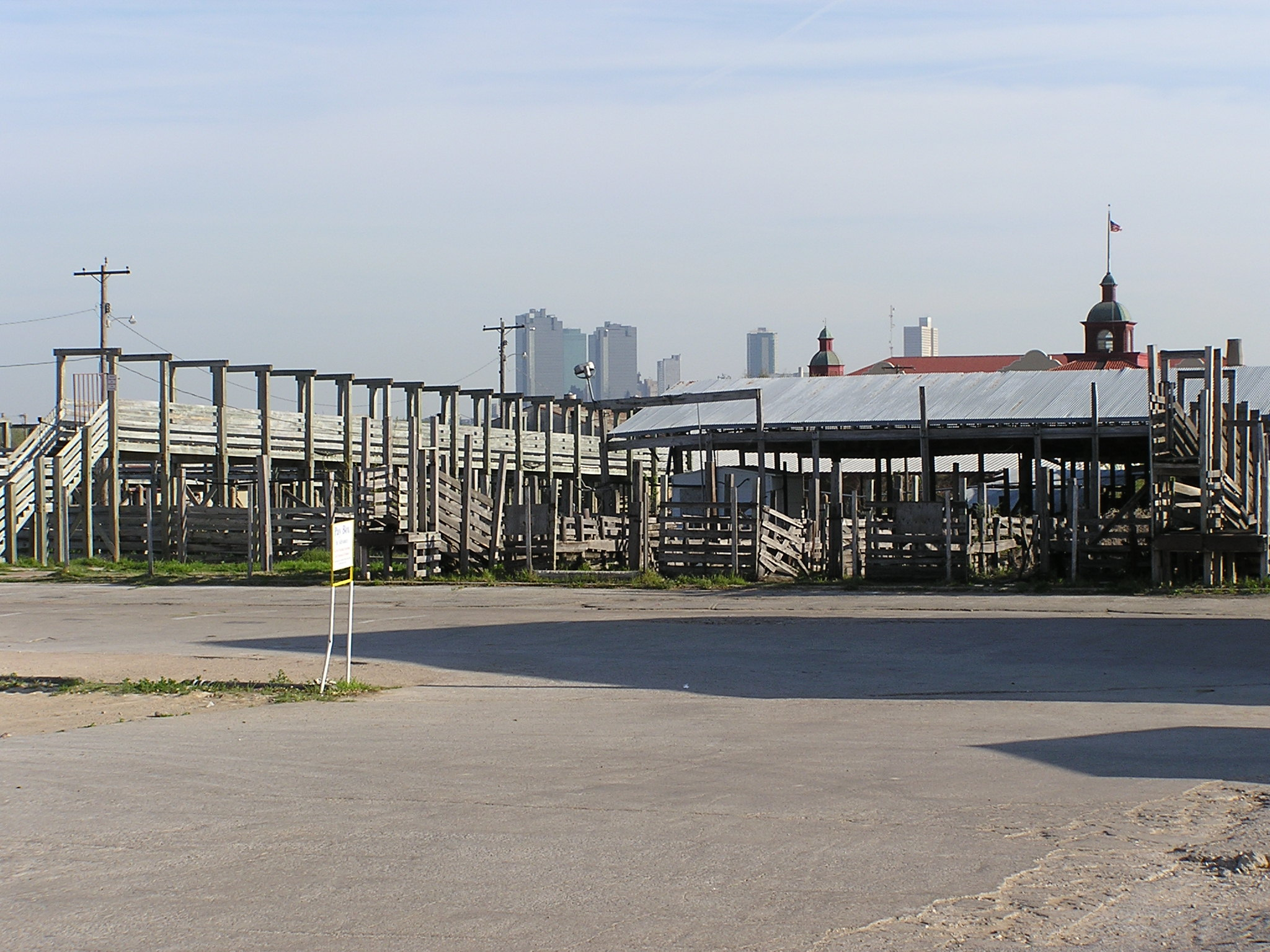
Cattle pens

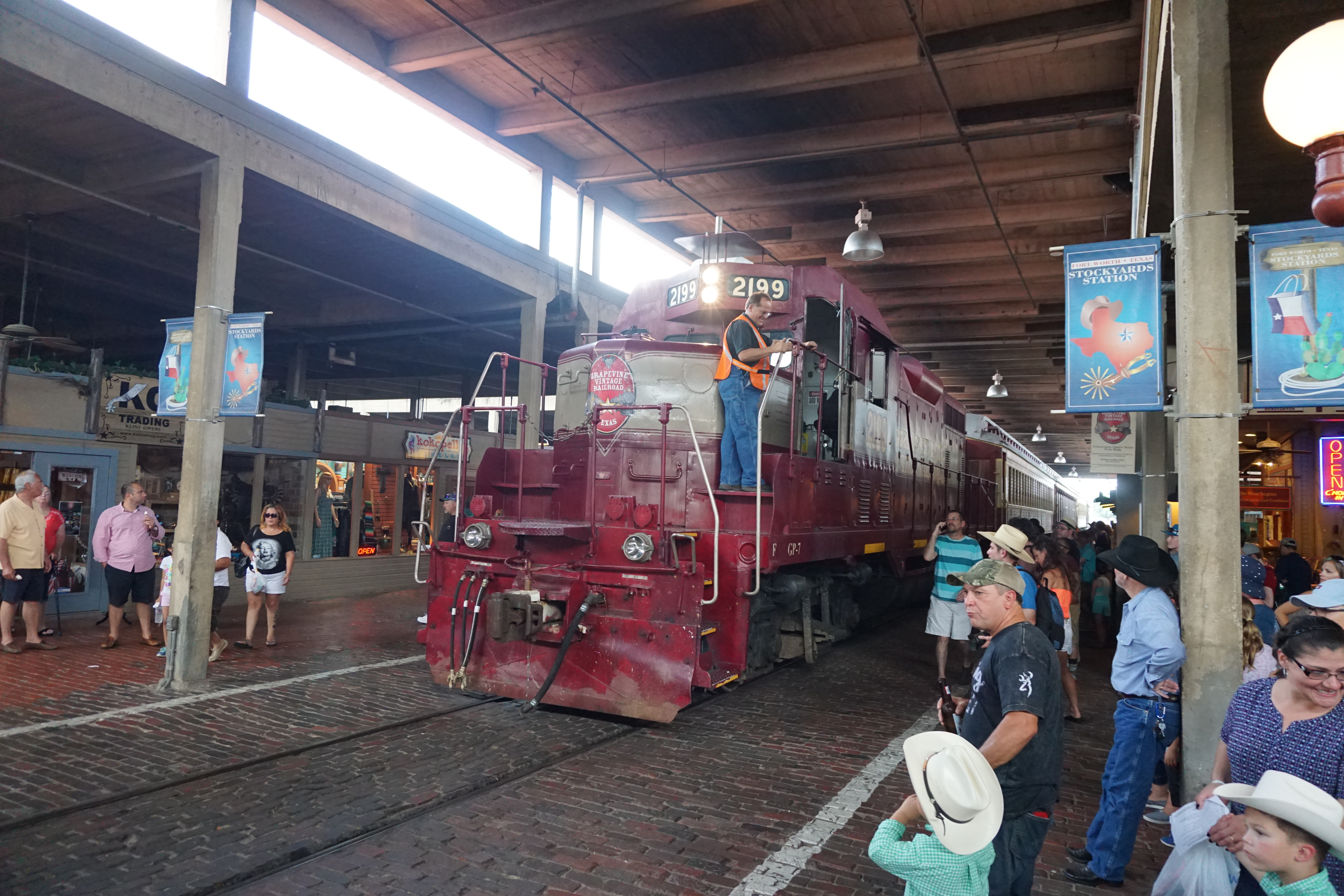
Grapevine Vintage Railroad at the Stockyards

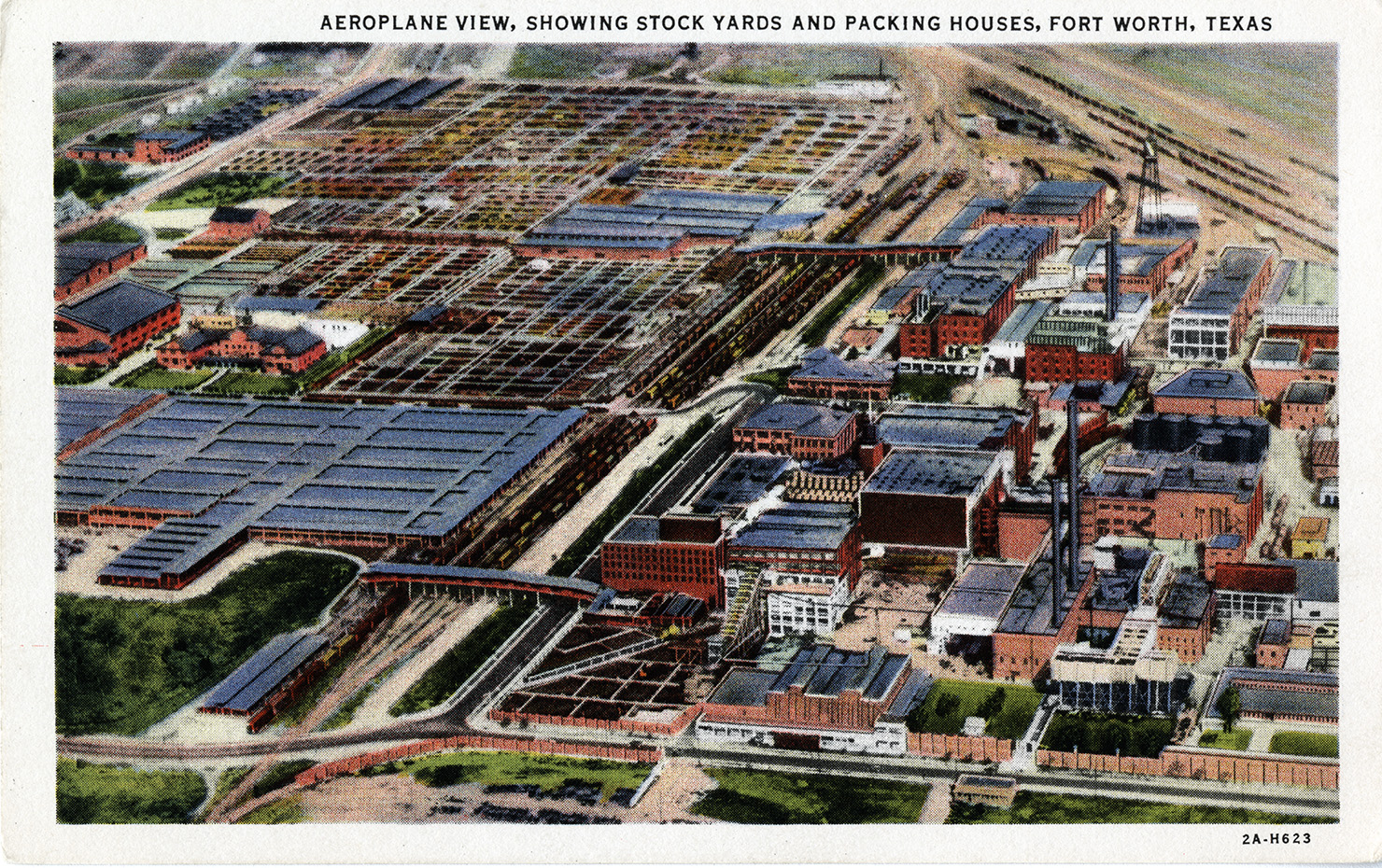
Postcard with an aerial view of the Stockyards, undated

== See also ==
- List of neighborhoods in Fort Worth, Texas
- Grapevine Vintage Railroad
- National Register of Historic Places listings in Tarrant County, Texas
- Recorded Texas Historic Landmarks in Tarrant County
