= Southern Pacific 975 =

Preserved SP F-1 class 2-10-2 locomotive

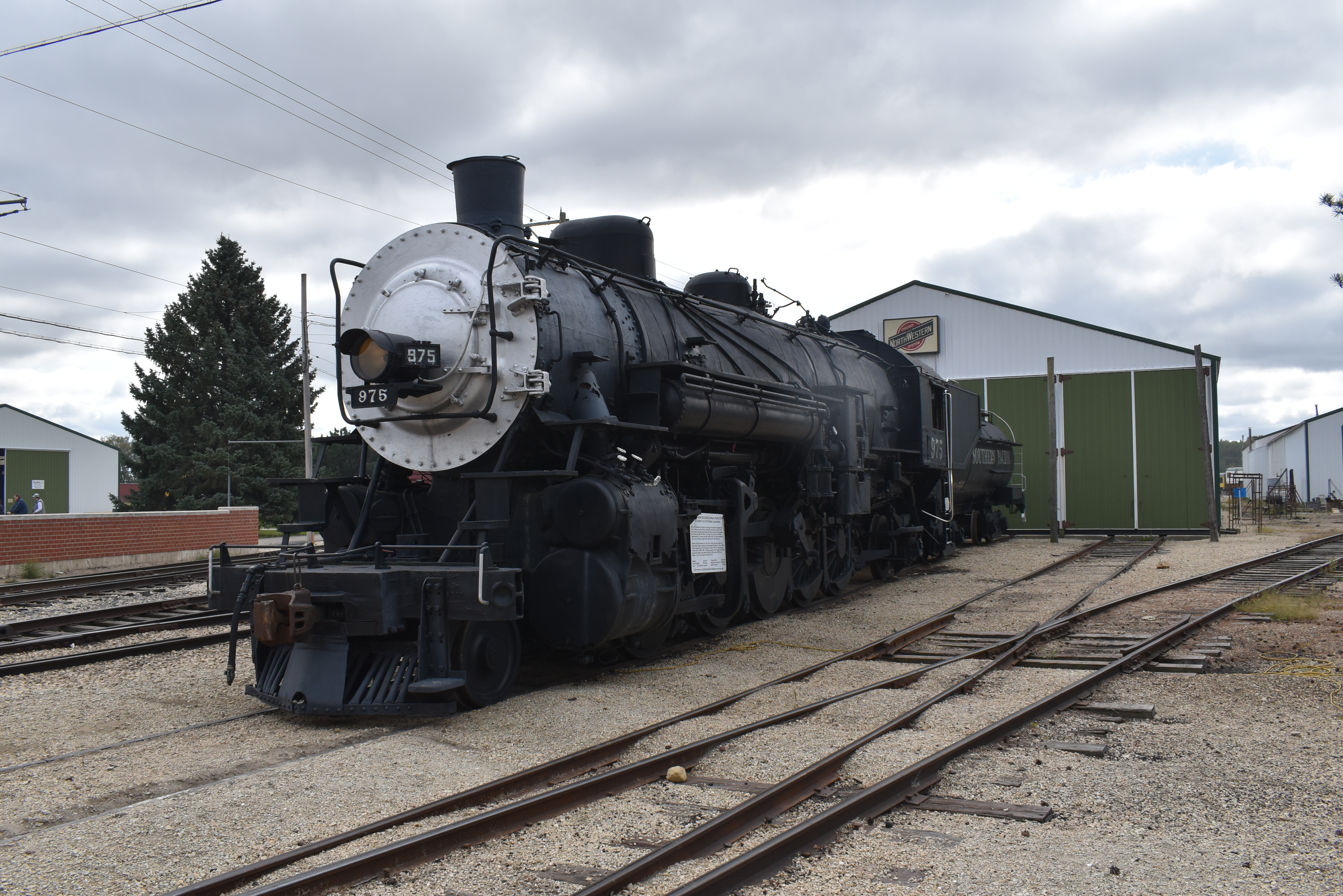
- Southern Pacific No. 975 at the Illinois Railway Museum
Type and origin
- Power type: Steam
- Builder: American Locomotive Company (Brooks Works)
- Serial number: 57978
- Build date: January 1918
Specifications
- Configuration
  - Whyte: 2-10-2
  - UIC: 1′E1′ h2
- Gauge: 4 ft 8 1/2 in (1,435 mm) standard gauge
- Driver dia.: 64 in (1.626 m)
- Length: 94 ft 10 in (28.91 m)
- Width: 10 ft 5 in (3.18 m)
- Axle load: 59,600 lb (27,000 kg; 27.0 t)
- Adhesive weight: 282,000 lb (128,000 kg; 128 t)
- Loco weight: 352,000 lb (160,000 kg; 160 t)
- Total weight: 525,500 lb (238,400 kg; 238.4 t)
- Fuel type: Oil
- Fuel capacity: 3,100 US gal (12,000 L; 2,600 imp gal)
- Water cap.: 10,000 US gal (38,000 L; 8,300 imp gal)
- Firebox
  - Grate area: 63 sq ft (5.9 m^{2})
- Boiler pressure: 200 lbf/in^{2} (1.38 MPa)
- Heating surface: 4,462 sq ft (414.5 m^{2})
- Superheater
  - Heating area: 950 sq ft (88 m^{2})
- Cylinders: Two, outside
- Cylinder size: 27.5 in × 32 in (698 mm × 813 mm)
- Valve gear: Walschaerts
- Loco brake: Air
- Train brakes: Air
- Couplers: Knuckle
Performance figures
- Tractive effort: 63,300 lbf (281.6 kN)
Career
- Operators: Texas and New Orleans Railroad
- Class: F-1
- Numbers: SP 975
- Nicknames: Deks
- Delivered: March 1918
- Retired: 1957
- Preserved: February 2, 1957
- Restored: 2021 (cosmetically)
- Current owner: Illinois Railway Museum
- Disposition: On static display

Southern Pacific 975 is a F-1 class 2-10-2 "Santa Fe" type steam locomotive, built in 1918 by American Locomotive Company (ALCO) at the former Brooks Locomotive Works plant in Dunkirk, New York. It entered service on Southern Pacific (SOU) subsidiary Texas and New Orleans Railroad (TNO) in March 1918, where it worked until its retirement in 1957.

The T&NO donated the locomotive to the city of Beaumont, Texas, on February 2, 1957, with the project spearheaded by then Mayor Jimmie P. Cokinos. No. 975 is now preserved in static display at the Illinois Railway Museum (IRMX) in Union, Illinois. It is one of only two Southern Pacific locomotives of this wheel arrangement to be preserved; the other is 982, which has moved to Union Station, Daikin Park in Houston, Texas in 2005. Today, No. 975 has since received a cosmetic restoration and is now on display.
