= EMD SD7 =

Model of 1500 hp Co′Co′ American diesel locomotive

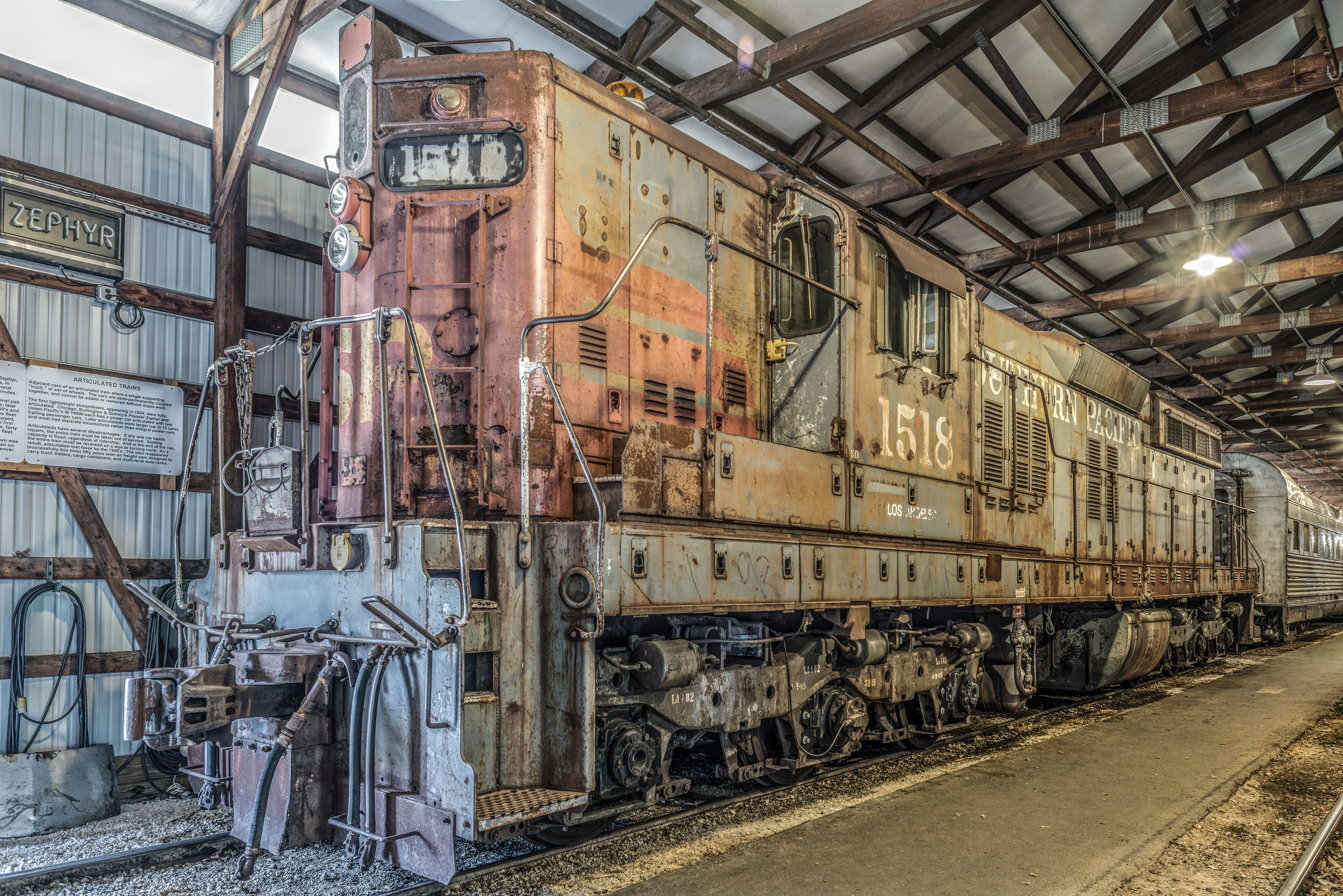
- SP #1518 inside Barn 9 at the Illinois Railway Museum in Union, Illinois on May 27, 2023.
Type and origin
- Power type: Diesel-electric
- Builder: General Motors Electro-Motive Division (EMD)
- Model: SD7
- Build date: May 1951 – November 1953
- Total produced: 188
Specifications
- Configuration
  - AAR: C-C
- Gauge: 4 ft 8 1/2 in (1,435 mm) standard gauge
- Trucks: EMD Flexicoil C
- Wheel diameter: 40 in (1,016 mm)
- Minimum curve: 23° (250 ft (76.20 m) radius)
- Wheelbase: 48 ft 7 in (14.81 m)
- Length: 61 ft 2 3/4 in (18.66 m)
- Width: 10 ft 8 in (3.25 m)
- Height: 15 ft 4 1/2 in (4.69 m)
- Loco weight: 309,000 lb (140,000 kg)
- Fuel capacity: 1,200 US gal (4,500 L; 1,000 imp gal)
- Prime mover: EMD 16-567B
- RPM range: 800
- Engine type: V16 diesel engine
- Aspiration: Roots-type blower
- Displacement: 9,072 cu in (148.66 L)
- Generator: D-12-C
- Traction motors: (6) D-27-B
- Cylinders: 16
Performance figures
- Maximum speed: 65 mph (105 km/h)
- Power output: 1,500 hp (1.12 MW)
- Tractive effort: 77,250 lbf (343,600 N)
Career
- Locale: United States
- Disposition: Some still in service, others preserved

The EMD SD7 is a model of 6-axle diesel locomotive built by General Motors Electro-Motive Division between May 1951 and November 1953. It had an EMD 567B 16-cylinder engine producing 1,500 horsepower (1.12 MW) for its six traction motors. United States railroads bought 188 units.

This was the first model in EMD's SD (Special Duty) series of locomotives, a lengthened B-B GP7 with a C-C truck arrangement. The two extra axles and traction motors are useful in heavy, low-speed freight service. EMD continues to produce SD series locomotives to this day. Some SD7s both high and short-hood can still be found in service today on shortline railroads and industrial operators, although most Class I roads stopped using these locomotives by the 1970s and 1980s.

== Design and production ==
The SD7 was conceived as a modification of the existing EMD GP7 with two additional powered axles, one for each truck. Providing two more axles served two purposes: it gave the locomotive more tractive effort compared to the four-axle GP7, and it distributed the locomotive's weight more evenly.

EMD produced its first examples of the SD7 in May 1951, using the 567B engine. Starting in August 1953 a total of 26 SD7s were produced which used either the 567BC engine or the 567C engine.

SD7s were originally set up to run long hood forward, usually noted by the letter "F" painted adjacent to the top step of the long hood boarding steps. Many were later changed or upgraded to run short hood forward as is today's Association of American Railroads standard.

EMD ended production in November 1953 and began producing the SD7's successor, the SD9, in January 1954.

== Rebuilds ==
=== SD7R ===
The Southern Pacific Transportation Company (SP) had rebuilt a total of 42 of their SD7 locomotives into the EMD SD7R. They were numbered 1500–1542. The rebuilds had also included upgrades to the electrical systems, traction motors, as well as a changeout of the prime movers swapping the 16-cylinder 567B prime movers with 16-cylinder 645CE prime movers.

The Chicago and North Western Transportation Company (C&NW) had seven SD7s rebuilt at their own Oelwein shops in Oelwein, Iowa changing their power output from 1,500 horsepower (1.12 Megawatts) to 1,750 horsepower (1.30 Megawatts). All seven C&NW units were retired from the C&NW's roster on September 5, 1986, and sold to the Dakota, Minnesota and Eastern Railroad (DM&E).

== Original buyers ==
Image	Owner	Quantity	Numbers	Notes	Ref.
	Electro-Motive Division	2	990	to Southern Pacific 5308 then to 2715 to 1415 and finally 1518. Preserved at the Illinois Railway Museum.	
	Electro-Motive Division	2	991	to Baltimore and Ohio 760	
	Baltimore and Ohio Railroad	4	761–764	These units were built with the 567BC engine.	
	Bessemer and Lake Erie Railroad	8	451–455, 801–803		
	Chicago and North Western Railway	5	1660–1664		
	Chicago, Burlington and Quincy Railroad	37	300–324, 400–411	322-324 were built with the 567BC engine. To Burlington Northern 6023-6059	
	Chicago, Burlington and Quincy Railroad (Colorado and Southern Railway)	10	810–819	To Burlington Northern 6070-6079	
	Chicago, Burlington and Quincy Railroad (Fort Worth and Denver Railway)	11	850–860	858-860 were built with the 567BC engine. To Burlington Northern 6080-6090	
	Chicago, Milwaukee, St. Paul and Pacific Railroad	24	2200–2223	Renumbered 500–523, 2215-2223 were built with the 567BC engine.	
	Central of Georgia Railway	1	201		
	Denver and Rio Grande Western Railroad	5	5300–5304		
	Great Northern Railway	23	550–572	To Burlington Northern 6000-6022	
	Kennecott Copper Corporation	1	903		
	Minneapolis and St. Louis Railway	2	852, 952	Renumbered 300–301. To Chicago and North Western Railway.	
	Nevada Northern Railway	1	401	Sold to LADWP in the 1980s; reacquired by Nevada Northern in 2021, along with RSD-4 #201.	
	Pennsylvania Railroad	2	8588–8589	These units were built with the 567BC engine. Later renumbered to 6950-6951, to Penn Central 6998-6999, and to Conrail 6998-6999	
	Southern Pacific Railroad	42	5279–5293, 5309–5335	5321-5323, 5334-5335 were built with the 567C engine	
	Union Pacific Railroad	10	775–784		
	Total	188			

== Preservation ==
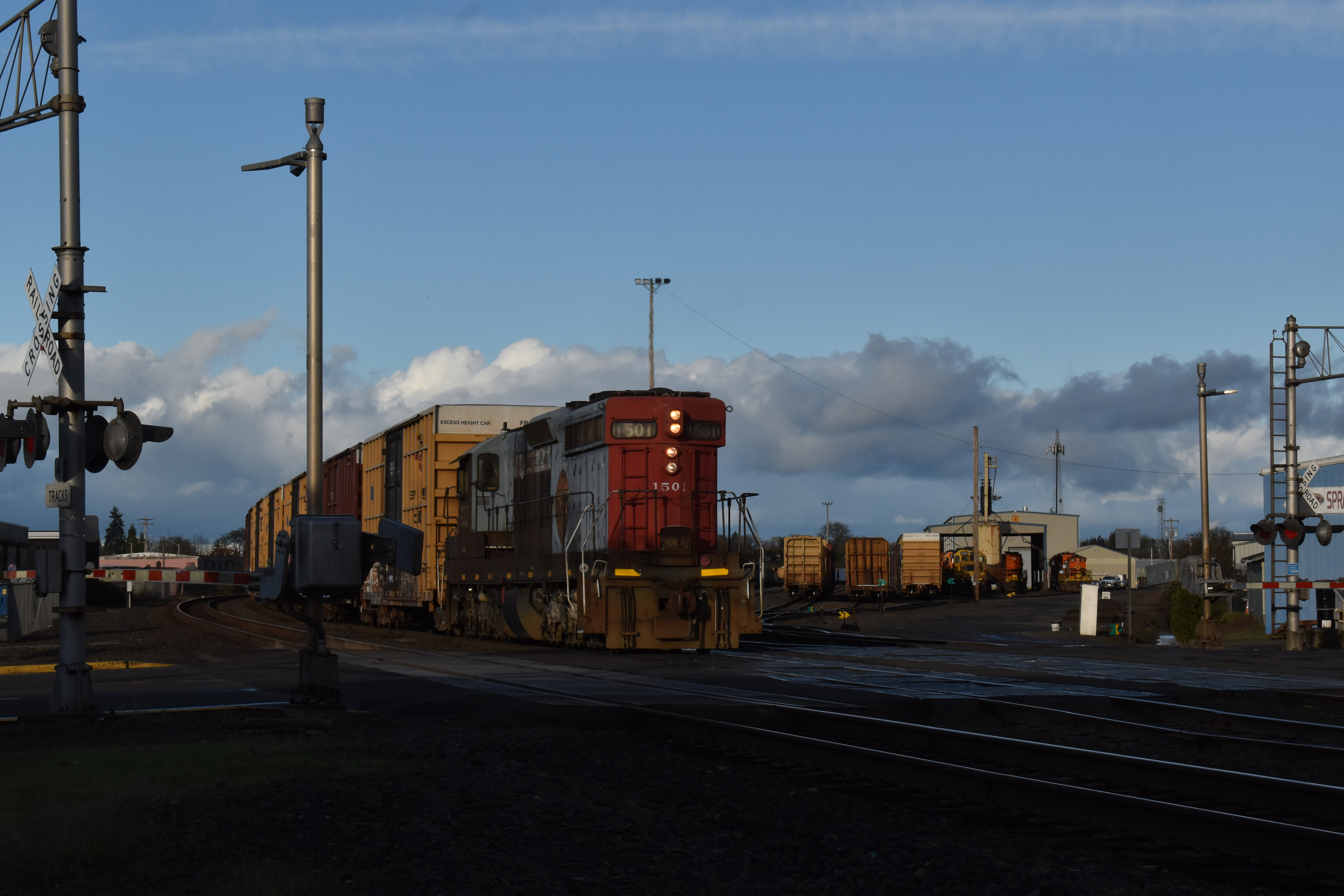
PNWR 1501 working in PNWR's yard in Albany, Oregon, on January 20, 2022

=== Currently preserved ===
- Burlington Northern #6008 (ex-Great Northern #558) is preserved at the Minnesota Transportation Museum in Saint Paul, Minnesota. #6008 was one of the first 20 SD7s to be built in 1952; it's currently under restoration to its original appearance as Great Northern #558.
- Southern #197 is preserved at the Virginia Museum of Transportation. It was originally built as Central of Georgia #201.
- Southern Pacific #1518 (ex-EMD demonstrator #990), is preserved in operational condition at the Illinois Railway Museum. #1518 was the first SD7 (later converted into an SD7R) built by EMD.
- Portland and Western formerly rostered SD7 #1501 (Ex-SP #5280), which was retired in 2023 as part of a fine resolution agreement with the EPA.
- ILSX #1751 (ex-Pennsylvania Railroad #8589) is in operation at Red Trail Energy in Richardton, ND.
- Nevada Northern Railway 401 is in service at the Intermountain Power Plant in Delta, Utah. When retired, it will be donated to the Nevada Northern Railway Museum, as part of an agreement with the museum.
