= 1935 Roseville, California railroad crash =

Railway incident in California, United States

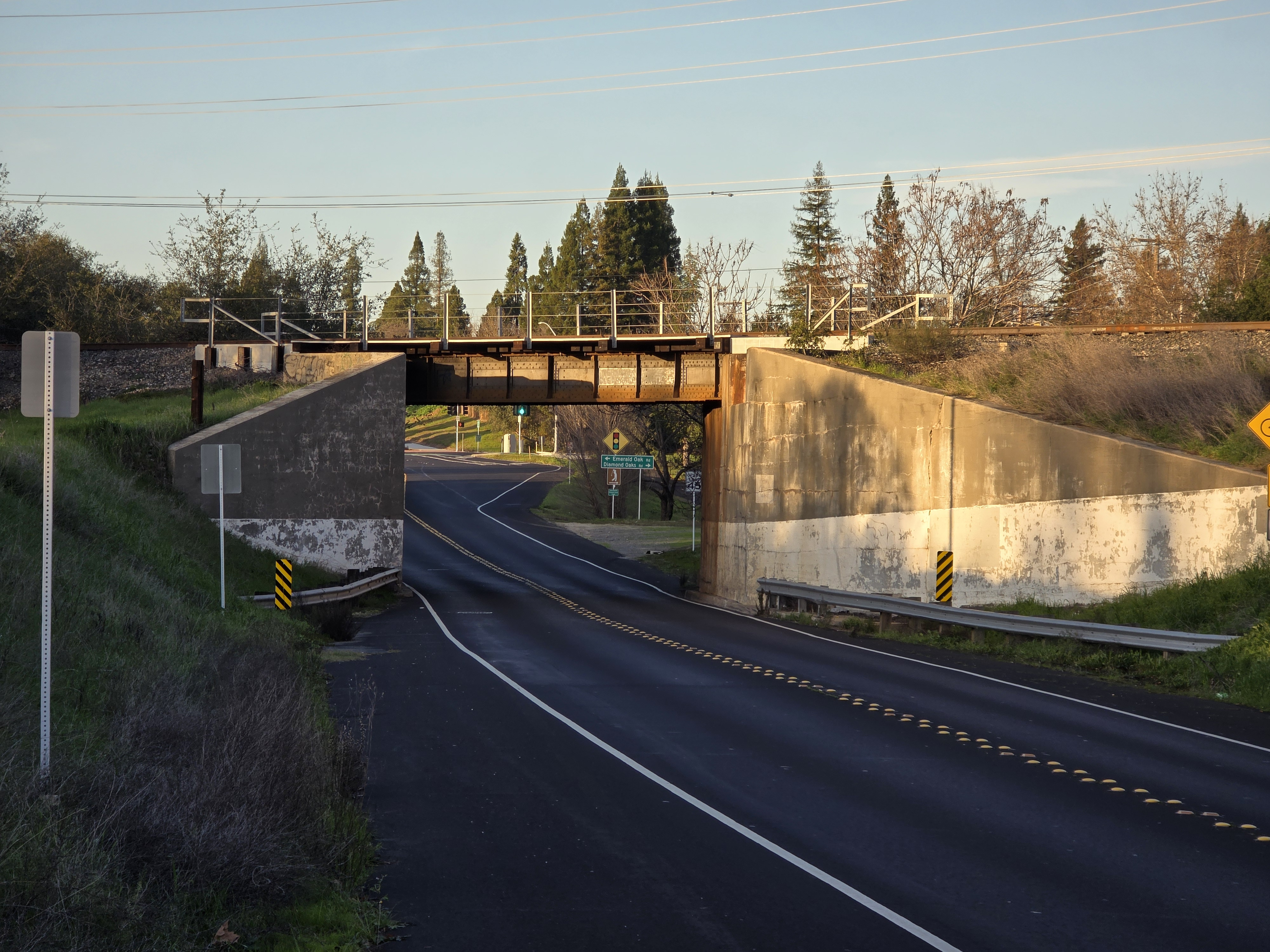
The approximate location of the 1935 railroad crash as seen in 2026

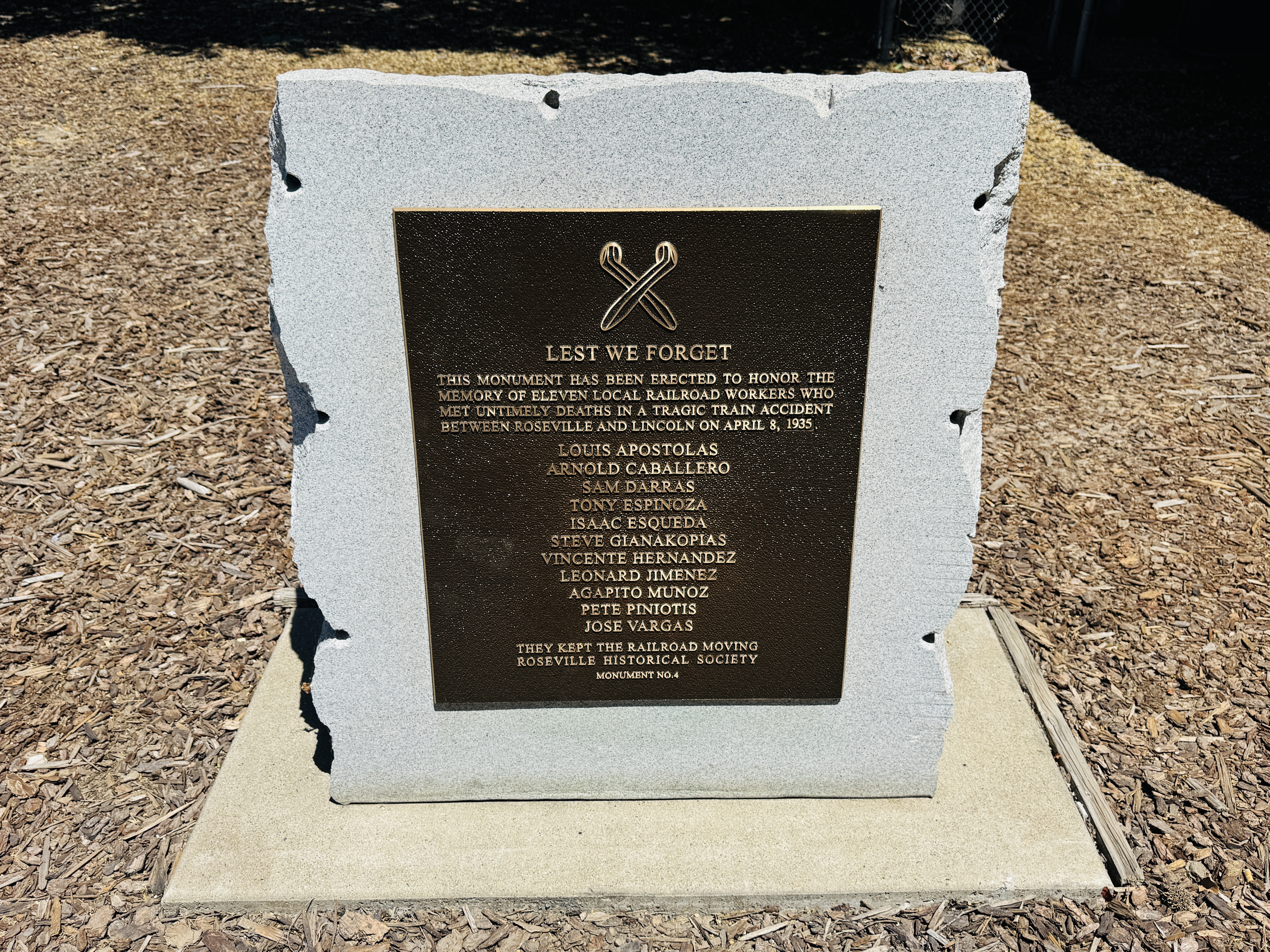
Lest We Forget monument at the Roseville Amtrak station

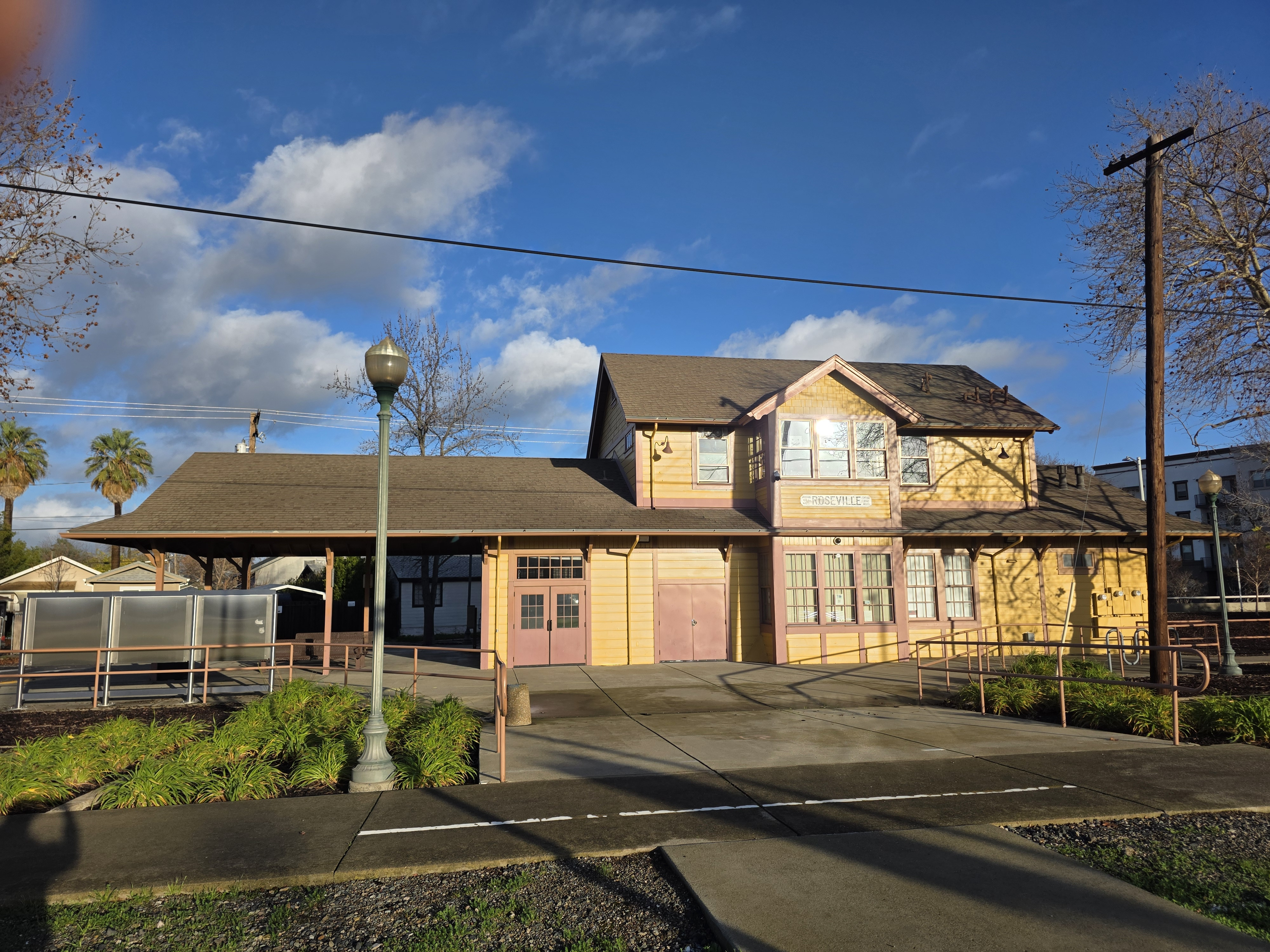
The Roseville Amtrak station is the site of the monument

The 1935 Roseville, California railroad crash on April 8, 1935 followed a severe rainstorm and flooding, and resulted in the deaths of 11 Southern Pacific Railroad workers in Roseville, California.

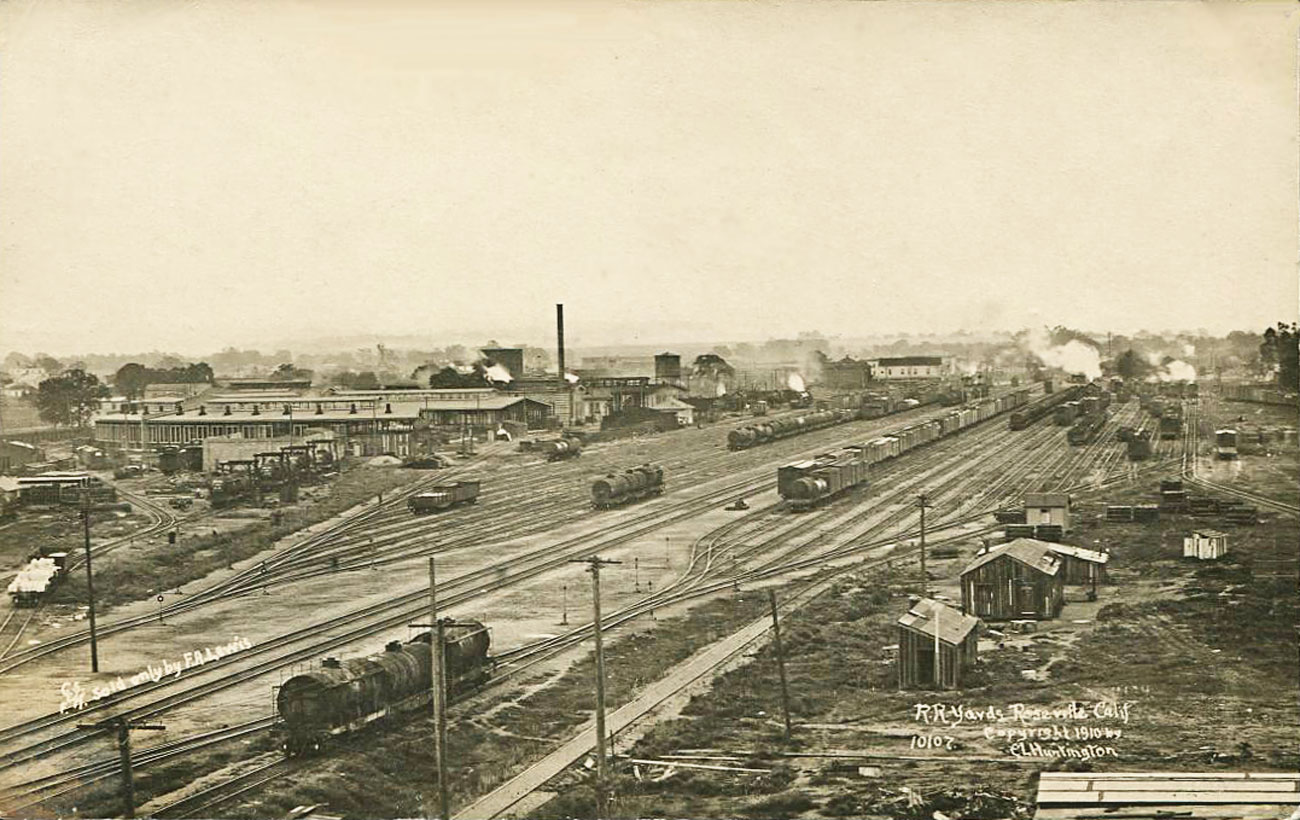
Southern Pacific Roseville Yards in 1910

On April 6 and 7, torrential rain fell in California's Sacramento Valley. The situation was exacerbated by the fact that local rivers were already at high levels. In addition, there was an unusually heavy accumulation of snow at moderate elevations in the Sierra Nevada mountains to the east. The rain caused massive melting of the snowpack, causing additional water to surge down the rivers into the valley. The result was widespread flooding in low lying valley areas. Three people drowned in Lincoln, California.

At that time, the Southern Pacific Railroad operated a major classification yard in Roseville that serviced the transcontinental Overland Route between the San Francisco Bay Area and Omaha, Nebraska. After a 1996 merger, the yard is now owned and operated by the Union Pacific Railroad. It is the largest railroad yard in California. A branch line runs north from this yard to Lincoln and Marysville, California. The storm and the flooding washed out the train tracks in several locations between Roseville and Lincoln, a distance of 11 miles. Southern Pacific dispatched a 14 man maintenance crew from the Roseville yard on April 8 to begin repair work on the damaged tracks. The workers traveled in two open self-propelled railcars. At the end of the workday, the crew was traveling back to the Roseville yard when it collided at about 8:30 p.m. with a gravel car being pushed by a locomotive in the other direction. Due to darkness, poor weather and the position of the locomotive, neither crew was aware that the other was on the same track. Eleven of the men were killed, and some of their bodies were thrown as far as 50 feet from the impact point, ending up in a steep ravine. The crash occurred just north of the Andora underpass, where Washington Boulevard passes underneath the railroad tracks in Roseville, adjacent to a residential neighborhood now called Diamond Oaks.

All 11 of the men who were killed were buried in the Roseville Public Cemetery. Seven were of Mexican ancestry and were buried together. Four were of Greek ancestry, and were also buried together, after a funeral conducted by a Greek Orthodox priest. The accident had a negative impact on the morale of Roseville residents. The city had only about 5,500 people at that time, and railroad jobs were valued in the middle of the Great Depression, when unemployment was very high.

Seventy years later in 2005, the Roseville Historical Society installed a simple memorial monument honoring the 11 men at the Roseville Amtrak passenger station, which is located at the Roseville yard. Titled "Lest We Forget", the monument's plaque lists the men by name.
