= Southern Pacific class MC-2 =

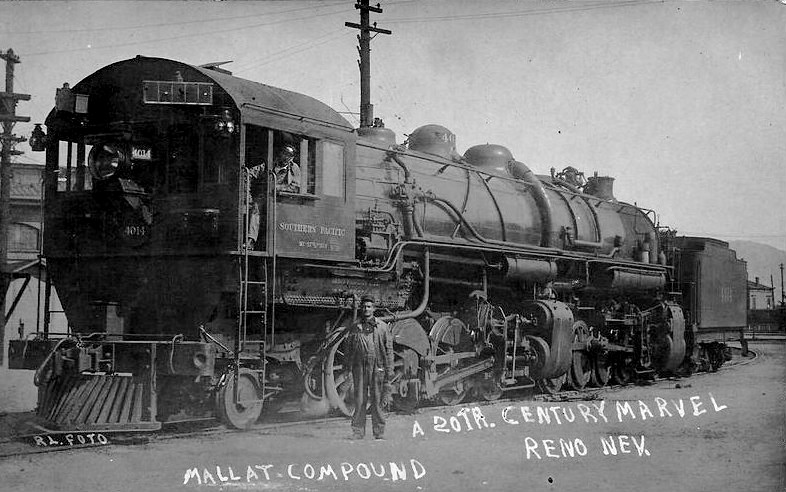
- Number 4014 in 1910.
Type and origin
- Power type: Steam
- Builder: Baldwin Locomotive Works
- Serial number: 34019, 34043, 34044, 34046, 34047, 34063-34067, 34093-34097
- Build date: November–December 1909
Specifications
- Configuration
  - Whyte: 2-8-8-2
- Gauge: 4 ft 8 1/2 in (1,435 mm) standard gauge
- Driver dia.: 57 in (1,448 mm)
- Adhesive weight: 394,700 lb (179,000 kg)
- Loco weight: 437,000 lb (198,000 kg)
- Fuel type: oil
- Boiler pressure: 200 psi (1.4 MPa)
- High-pressure cylinder: 26 in × 30 in (660 mm × 762 mm)
- Low-pressure cylinder: 40 in × 30 in (1,016 mm × 762 mm)
Performance figures
- Tractive effort: 94,880 lbf (422.05 kN)
Career
- Operators: Southern Pacific Railroad
- Class: MC-2
- Number in class: 15
- Numbers: 4002 – 4016
- First run: February 4, 1910
- Retired: 1946 – 1948
- Disposition: scrapped

Southern Pacific Railroad's MC-2 class of steam locomotives was the first class to be ordered by and built for Southern Pacific (SP) as cab forward locomotives. They were built in 1909 following the design of SP's MC-1 class built earlier that year. The success of this locomotive model led to the design and introduction of the AC class of 4-8-8-2 cab forward locomotives in the 1930s and 1940s.

In order to get the fuel oil from the tender to the opposite end of the locomotive where the firebox sat, SP had to pressurize the oil in the tender. Five pounds-force per square inch (34 kPa) of air pressure was sufficient to get the oil to the fire.

The two MC-1 locomotives built in May 1909 were rebuilt in 1923 as MC-2 class with uniform cylinders measuring 22 in (559 mm) diameter × 30 in (762 mm) stroke; these rebuilt locomotives weighed 437,000 lb (198,000 kg), like the as-built MC-2 class, but with 393,700 lb (178,600 kg) on the drivers. Most of the rest of the MC-2 class were "simpled" to the same size cylinders by 1931. Except for numbers 4011 and 4013 which were both scrapped by 1936, all of the MC-2 and the two former MC-1 locomotives were rebuilt again into class AC-1 with a higher boiler pressure, but a lower overall tractive effort. The MC-2 rebuilds included installation of a new 4 1/4-BL Worthington feedwater heater as well.

SP used these locomotives until after World War II, retiring and then scrapping them in 1947 and 1948. The last locomotive of this class was scrapped on April 12, 1949, at SP's Sacramento shops.
