= Southern Pacific Class T-1 =

Class of 39 4-6-0 "Ten-Wheeler" type steam locomotives

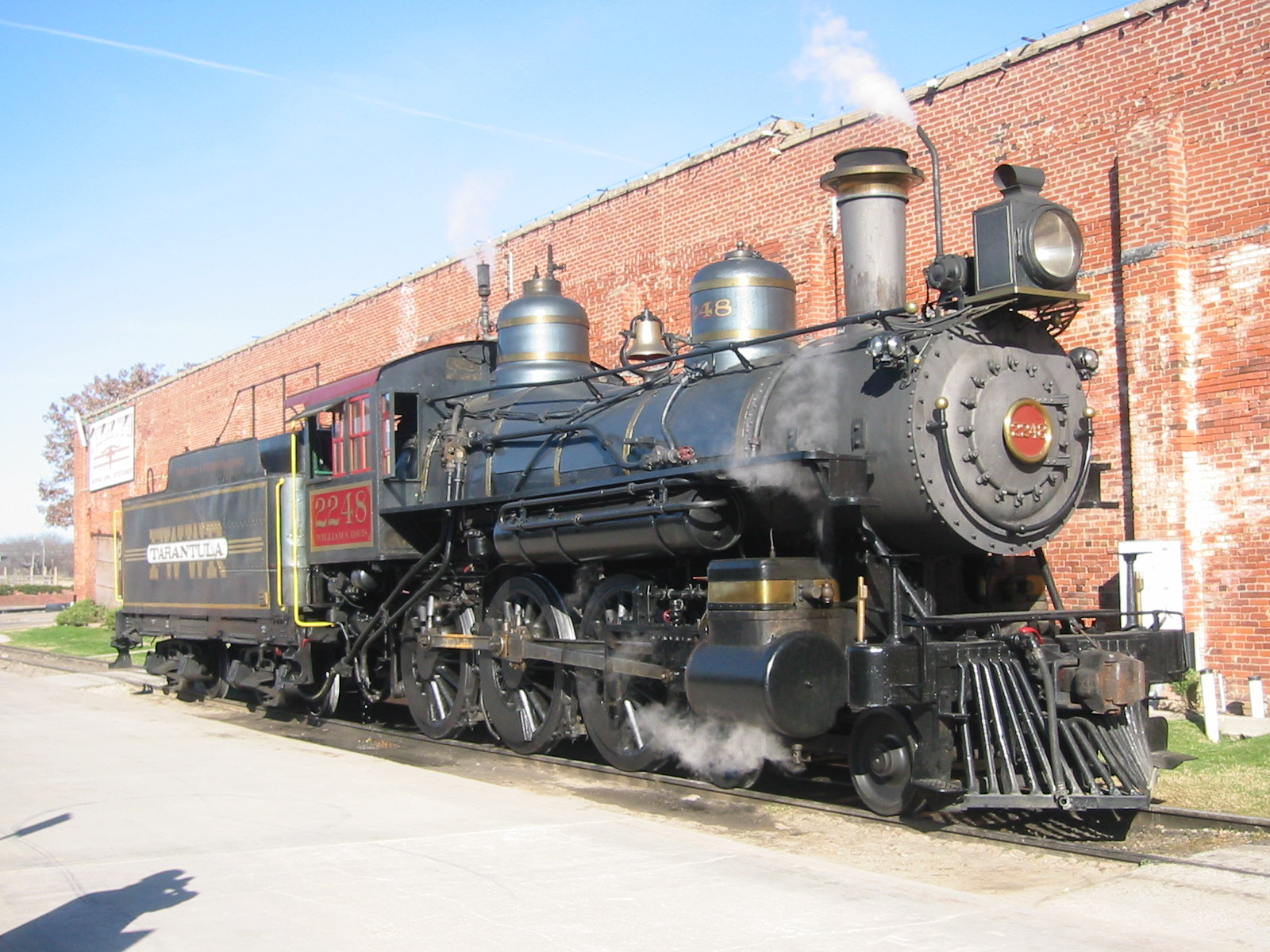
Type and origin
- Power type: Steam
- Builder: Cooke Locomotive and Machine Works (30); Schenectady Locomotive Works (9)
- Build date: 1896–1897
- Total produced: 39
Specifications
- Configuration
  - Whyte: 4-6-0
- Gauge: 1,435 mm (4 ft 8 1/2 in) standard gauge
- Fuel type: Coal
- Boiler pressure: 180 psi (1,200 kPa; 1.2 MPa)
- Cylinders: Two, outside
- Valve gear: Stephenson
- Valve type: Piston valves
- Loco brake: Air
- Train brakes: Air
- Couplers: Knuckle
Career
- Operators: Southern Pacific Railroad; Texas State Railroad; Fort Worth and Western Railroad; Grapevine Vintage Railroad
- Class: T-1
- Numbers: 2235–2273
- Nicknames: Puffy (No. 2248)
- Retired: 1956–1957
- Restored: 1974 (No. 2248)
- Disposition: Two preserved, remainder scrapped

The Southern Pacific Class T-1 is a class of 4-6-0 "Ten-Wheeler" type steam locomotives built by the Cooke Locomotive and Machine Works and the Schenectady Locomotive Works for the Southern Pacific Railroad.

== History ==
In the mid-to-late 1890s, the Southern Pacific Railroad needed more motive power for heavy passenger usage on the Southern Pacific's system. The Cooke Locomotive and Machine Works and the Schenectady Locomotive Works were tasked on building and refining a new locomotive from scratch and from the drawing board for the Southern Pacific Railroad. This resulted in the formation of what became the Southern Pacific Class T-1, these locomotives were designed to be used as heavy passenger locomotives on the Southern Pacific Railroad. A total of 39 of these locomotives were ever built between 1896 and 1897 by the Cooke Locomotive and Machine Works and the Schenectady Locomotive Works and all 39 locomotives were numbered 2235-2273.

No. 2248 was modified to fight fires in the forests that were located next to the lines operated by the Southern Pacific Railroad but these modifications were later removed.

== Preservation ==
Two locomotives have been preserved:

- No. 2248 was saved from the scrapper's torch as it was selected to be part of Disney's collection as they were looking for a locomotive to operate at one of their parks. However, the project never came to be and the 2248 was instead sold off to the Texas State Railroad (TSRR) in 1974, it was eventually restored to operating condition and was operated as TSRR No. 200. The locomotive would operate tourist excursions at the TSRR from 1976 until being taken out of service in 1981. In 1990. No. 2248 was later sold to the Fort Worth and Western Railroad for use on the Tarantula Express and operated there until being taken out of service again in 1999 due to major boiler work being required on the locomotive. In 2001, 2248 was restored back to operation and later sold again to the Grapevine Vintage Railroad in 2004 where it operated more excursions until being taken out of service once again in early 2016 due to boiler issues. The locomotive returned to service in August 2026 after undergoing a major overhaul.
- No. 2252 was also saved from the scrapper's torch and was donated by the Southern Pacific to the City of Roseville, California where the locomotive was placed on static display until 2003 when the locomotive was moved to its current location near the Southern Pacific's Roseville yard and is currently on display outside along with a rotary snowplow.
