= EMD SD9 =

North American diesel–electric locomotive class

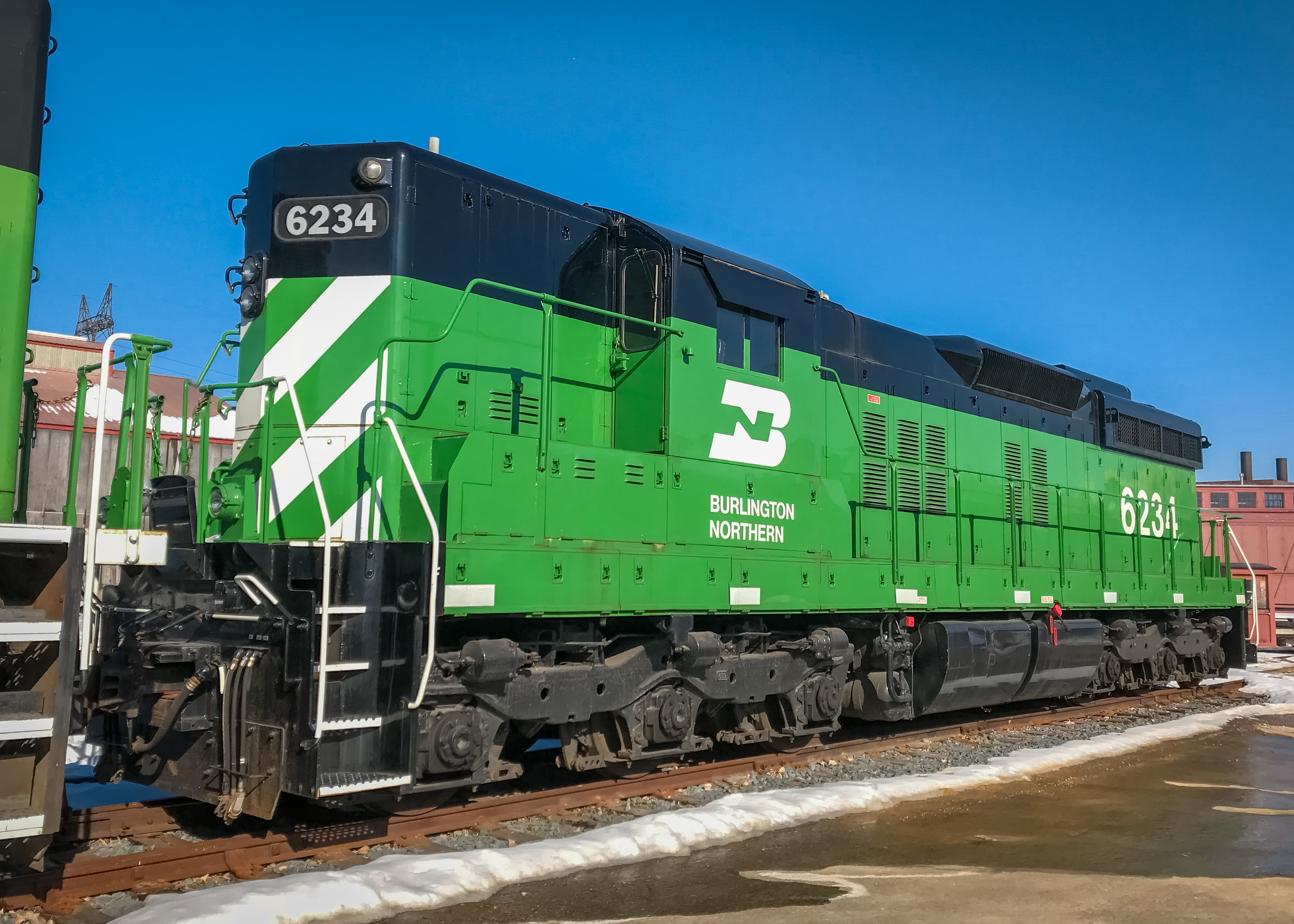
- Burlington Northern SD9 #6234.
Type and origin
- Power type: Diesel-electric
- Builder: General Motors Electro-Motive Division (EMD)
- Model: SD9
- Build date: January 1954 – June 1959
- Total produced: 515
Specifications
- Configuration
  - AAR: C-C
  - UIC: Co'Co'
- Gauge: 4 ft 8 1/2 in (1,435 mm) standard gauge
- Wheel diameter: 40 in (1,016 mm)
- Wheelbase: 48 ft 7 in (14.8 m)
- Length: 60 ft 8.5 in (18.5 m)
- Fuel capacity: 1,200 or 2,400 US gal (4,500 or 9,100 L; 1,000 or 2,000 imp gal)
- Lubricant cap.: 200 US gal (757 L)
- Sandbox cap.: 50 cu ft (1.4 m^{3})
- Prime mover: EMD 16-567C
- Engine type: V16 diesel
- Boiler: Vapor-Clarkson Steam Boiler OK4625
- Cylinders: 16
Performance figures
- Maximum speed: 65 mph (105 km/h)
- Power output: 1,750 hp (1.30 MW)
Career
- Disposition: Many have been rebuilt, and are still in service.

The EMD SD9 is a model of diesel locomotive built by General Motors Electro-Motive Division between January 1954 and June 1959. An EMD 567C 16-cylinder engine generated 1,750 horsepower (1.30 MW). Externally similar to its predecessor, the SD7, the SD9 was built with the improved and much more maintainable 567C engine.

471 SD9s were built for American railroads, while a further 44 were produced for export.

Many SD9s, both high and short hood variants, can still be found in service today on shortline railroads and with industrial operators. Although most Class I railroads stopped using these locomotives by the 1970s and 1980s, some remain on major Class I railroads in rebuilt form, as switcher locomotives.

== History ==
The SD9 was the second model of EMD's SD (special duty) line of locomotives, following the SD7. Just as the SD7 was a lengthened GP7 with two additional axles, the SD9 was a corresponding modification of the GP9. The additional axles in SD series locomotives provide more tractive effort and more even distribution of locomotive weight compared to the four axle GP series locomotives.

SD9s can be distinguished from the similar looking SD7s by observing the position of the classification lights on the ends of the locomotive, above the number board. The SD9's classification lights are on a small pod, canted outward, while the SD7's classification lights are closer to the centerline and flush with the hood.

== Variants ==
=== SD9s ===
EMD produced a lightweight variant of the SD9, named the SD9s. This locomotive had its weight reduced for service on lighter tracks with modifications such as a smaller fuel tank.

=== SD9E ===
Between August 1970 and March 1980, the Southern Pacific Transportation Company had rebuilt 144 of their units into EMD SD9E locomotives under their own rebuild program known as the General Rehabilitation and Improvement Program (G.R.I.P). 142 of their rebuilt units were renumbered as 4300-4441 and two additional rebuilt units being renumbered as 4450 and 4451. These 142 units were also reclassified as EF618E-1, with their two units #4450 and #4451 as EF618E-2, which had left six other SD9 locomotives un-rebuilt.

== Original buyers ==
Railroad	Quantity	Road numbers	Notes
Electro-Motive Division (demonstrator)	1	5591	to Duluth, Missabe and Iron Range 110
Atlanta and St. Andrews Bay Railroad	3	503–505	503 was wrecked at Youngstown, Florida on February 26, 1978, and scrapped.
Baltimore and Ohio Railroad	10	765–774	
Chicago, Burlington and Quincy Railroad	80	325–374, 430–459	300s had steam generators. To Burlington Northern 6127-6206
Chicago, Burlington and Quincy Railroad (C&S)	23	820–842	To Burlington Northern 6215-6237 6234 preserved
Central of Georgia Railway	6	202–207	
Chicago and Illinois Midland Railroad	5	50–54	
Chicago and North Western Railway	14	1701–1710, 1721–1724	Fitted for Chicago commuter service
Chicago, Milwaukee, St. Paul and Pacific Railroad	14	2224–2237	Renumbered 530-543
Chile Exploration	5	901–905	Track gauge?
Duluth, Missabe and Iron Range Railroad	73	101–109, 111–174	129–130 had steam generators
Denver and Rio Grande Western Railroad	10	5305–5314	
Elgin, Joliet and Eastern Railway	3	600–602	
Great Northern Railway	27	573–599	To Burlington Northern 6100-6126
Korail (Korea)	29	101–129	Later renumbered 5001-5029
New York, Chicago and St. Louis Railroad (“Nickel Plate Road”)	20	340–359	
Orinoco Mining (Venezuela)	10	1011–1020	
Pennsylvania Railroad	25	7600–7624	
Reserve Mining	1220–1225	1220-1224 to Escanaba and Lake Superior Railroad in 1992.	
Soo Line (Wisconsin Central Railroad)	1	2381	
Southern Pacific Company	150	5340–5444, 5449–5493	5340–5391 had steam generators
Total	515		

== Preservation ==
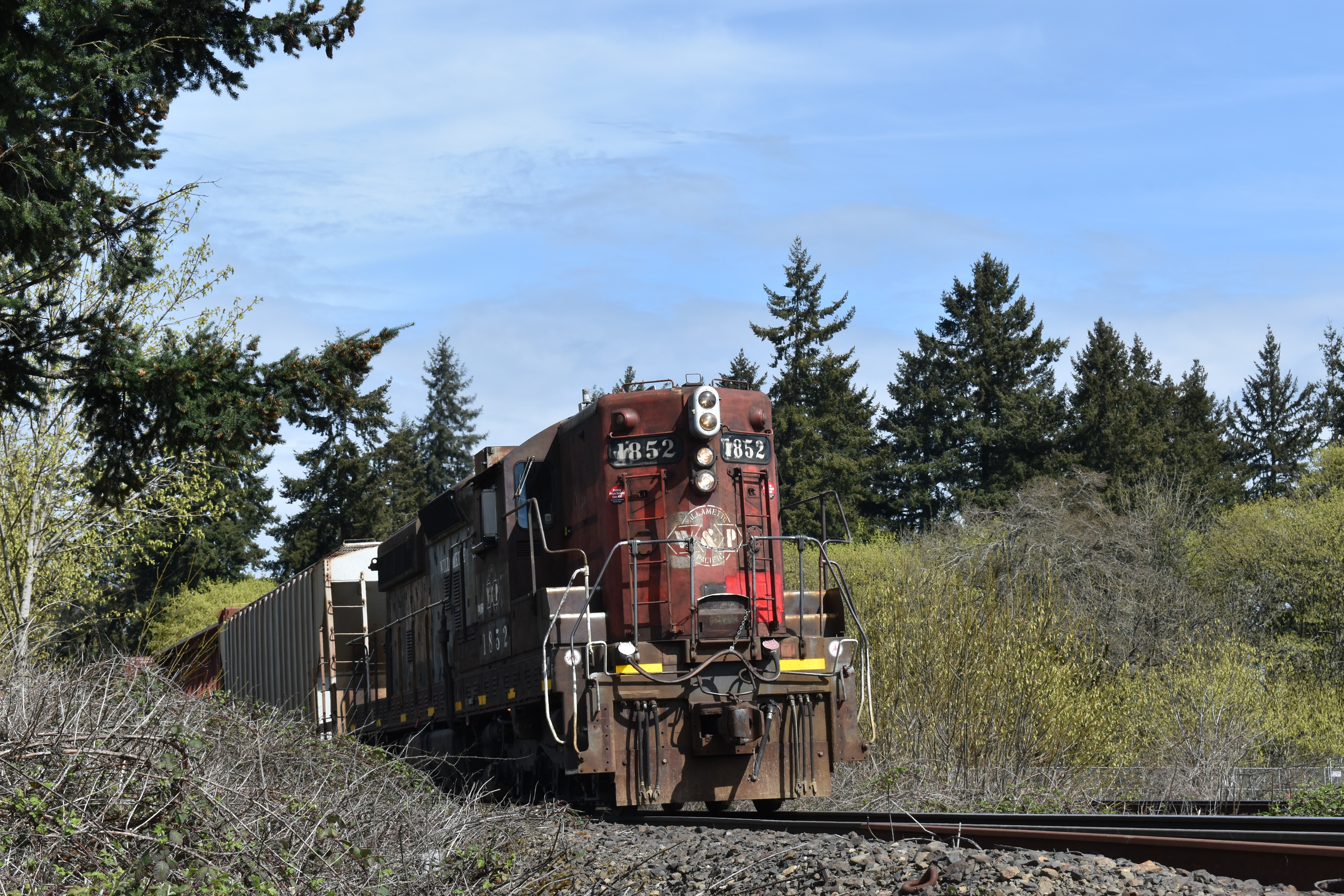
PNWR 1852 in Albany, Oregon

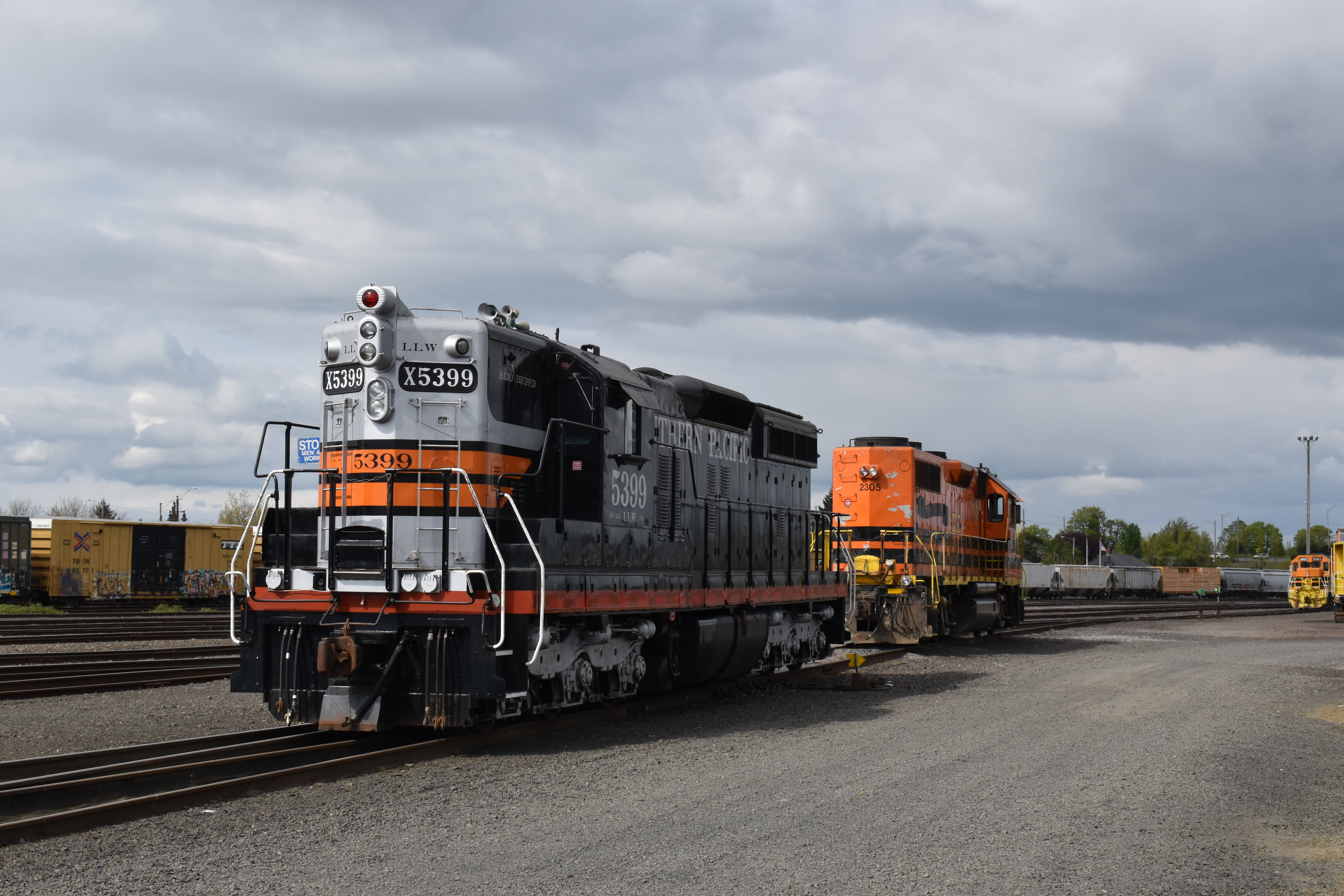
AERC 5399 in Albany, Oregon

Some SD9 locomotives can be found in museums and on tourist lines, and at least two are in service on a working railroad.

- BNSF #1550 is preserved at the Lake Superior Railroad Museum, having been donated by BNSF in 2022.
- BNSF #1730 (ex-GN #598) is preserved at the Inland Northwest Rail Museum at Reardan, Washington, having been donated in 2020. It is being restored into its original Great Northern appearance. Sister locomotive Great Northern #599 is also preserved by the same museum and will undergo a cosmetic restoration, with mechanical parts used for the restoration of #598. The 599 was previously donated to the city of Skykomish, WA and was on display until 2019-2022.
- Milwaukee Road #532 is preserved and operational at the Whitewater Valley Railroad.
- Nevada Northern Railway #204 (ex-SP #4426) is preserved and operational at the Nevada Northern Railway Museum in Ely, Nevada, and was recently repainted and renumbered to #250 to celebrate the United States Semiquincentennial in 2026.
- Nickel Plate Road #358 is preserved and operational at the Fort Wayne Railroad Historical Society. It has been restored into its original appearance.
- Escanaba & Lake Superior Railroad #1221 and #1224 are active assigned to Channing Michigan's Upper Peninsula and NE Wisconsin. Units #1222 stored. Unit #1220 ran for about a year and then was stored OOS, stored for parts. #1223 ran for a week in 2026 before checking fire fate unknown. Despite rumors, Reserve Mining unit #1225 was never purchased by the ELS RR.
- Black River and Western Railroad #9581 leased in virginia (Central Of Georgia 202).
