= Southern Pacific Railroad =

United States Class I railroad (1865–1996)

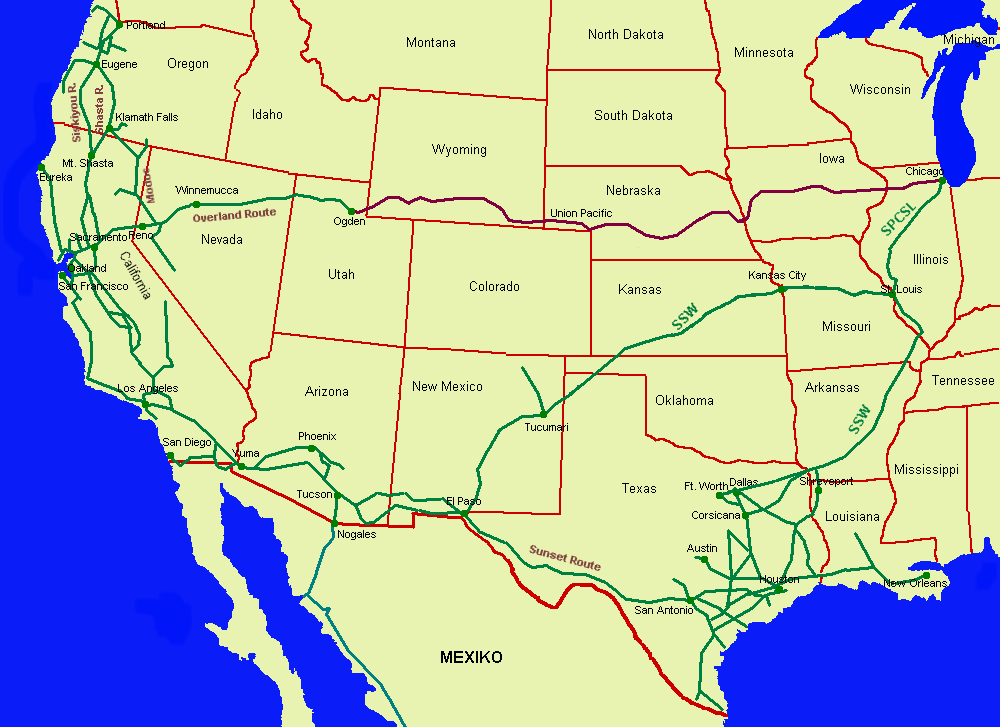
- SP system map (before the 1988 DRGW merger)

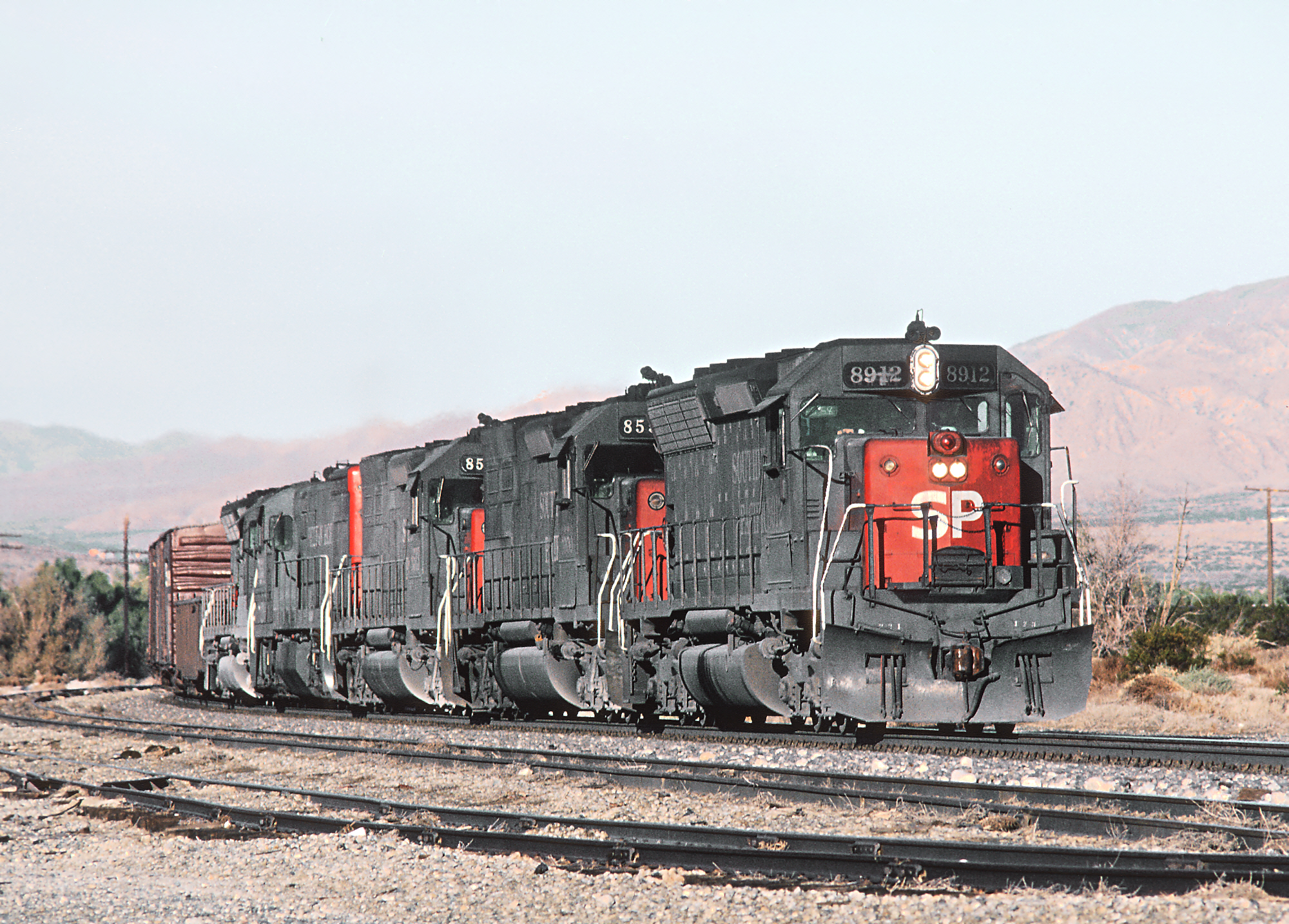
- SP #8912 leads a freight train in Palm Springs, California, in February 1981.

Overview
- Headquarters: San Francisco, California
- Founders: William Tell Coleman; Timothy Guy Phelps; William Rosecrans; Leland Stanford
- Reporting mark: SP
- Locale: Arizona, Arkansas, California, Colorado, Illinois, Kansas, Louisiana, Missouri, Nevada, New Mexico, Oklahoma, Oregon, Tennessee, Texas, Utah
- Dates of operation: 1865–1996
- Predecessor: Central Pacific Railroad
- Successors: Santa Fe Pacific Corporation; Union Pacific Railroad

Technical
- Track gauge: 4 ft 8 1/2 in (1,435 mm) standard gauge with some 3 ft (914 mm) narrow gauge branches

The Southern Pacific (reporting mark SP) (or Espee from the railroad initials) was an American Class I railroad network that existed from 1865 to 1996 and operated largely in the Western United States. The system was operated by various companies under the names Southern Pacific Railroad, Southern Pacific Company and Southern Pacific Transportation Company.

The original Southern Pacific began in 1865 as a land holding company. The last incarnation of the Southern Pacific, the Southern Pacific Transportation Company, was founded in 1969 and assumed control of the Southern Pacific system. The Southern Pacific Transportation Company was acquired in 1996 by the Union Pacific Corporation and merged with their Union Pacific Railroad.

The Southern Pacific legacy founded hospitals in San Francisco, Tucson, and Houston. In the 1970s, it also founded a telecommunications network with a state-of-the-art microwave and fiber optic backbone. This telecommunications network became part of Sprint, a company whose name came from the acronym for Southern Pacific Railroad Internal Networking Telephony.

== History ==
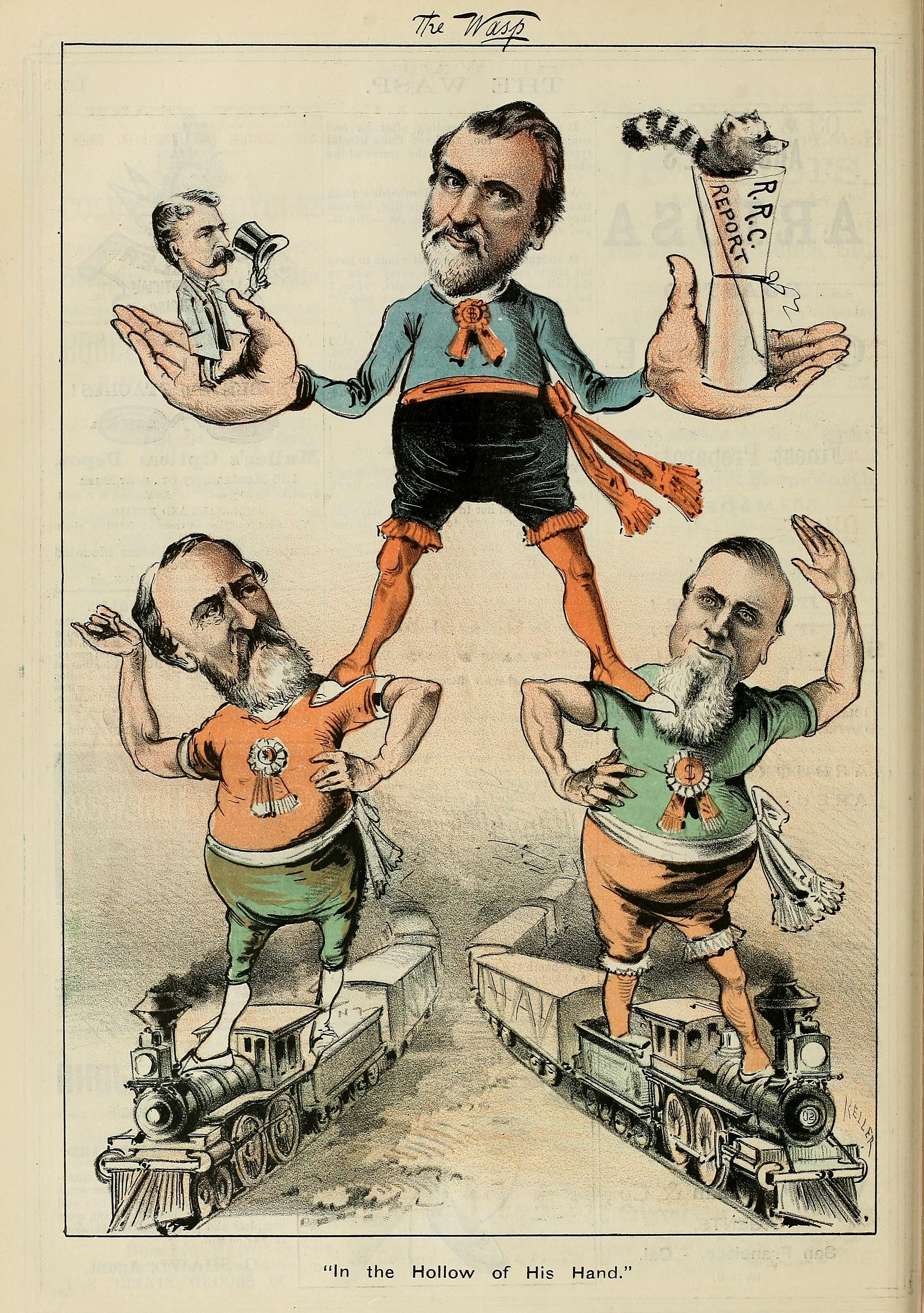
"In the Hollow of His Hand," a political cartoon by George Frederick Keller published in The Wasp depicting California Railroad Commissioners Charles J. Beerstecher and J. S. Cone as puppets of Southern Pacific president Leland Stanford, February 19, 1881

The original Southern Pacific Railroad was founded in San Francisco in 1865, by a group of businessmen led by Timothy Phelps with the aim of building a rail connection between San Francisco and San Diego, California. The company was purchased in September 1868 by a group of businessmen known as the Big Four: Charles Crocker, Leland Stanford, Mark Hopkins, Jr. and C. P. Huntington. (The Big Four had, in 1861, created the Central Pacific Railroad (CPRR)) It later acquired the routes of the Central Pacific Railroad in 1885 through leasing. By 1900, the Southern Pacific system was a major railroad system incorporating many smaller companies, such as the Texas and New Orleans Railroad and Morgan's Louisiana and Texas Railroad. It extended from New Orleans through Texas to El Paso, across New Mexico and through Tucson, to Los Angeles, through most of California, including San Francisco and Sacramento. Central Pacific lines extended east across Nevada to Ogden, Utah, and reached north through Oregon to Portland. Other subsidiaries eventually included the St. Louis Southwestern Railway (Cotton Belt, reporting marks SSW), El Paso and Southwestern Railroad, the Northwestern Pacific Railroad at 328 miles (528 km), the 1,331-mile (2,142 km) Southern Pacific Railroad of Mexico, and a variety of 3 ft (914 mm) narrow-gauge routes.

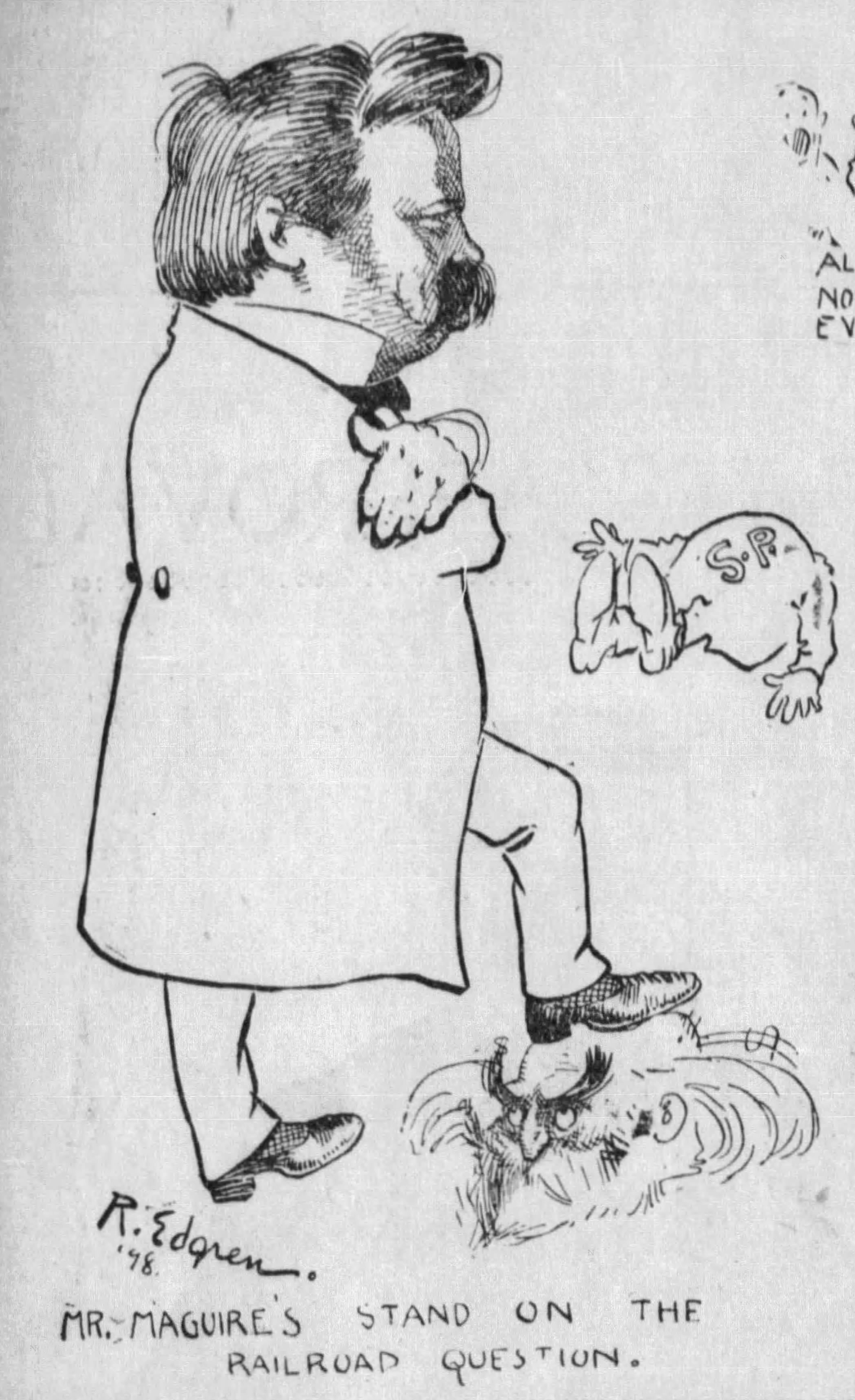
"Mr. Maguire's Stand on the Railroad Question," a caricature of Democratic gubernatorial candidate James G. Maguire published in the San Francisco Examiner depicting him triumphant over the political forces of the Southern Pacific, October 8, 1898

The company was headquartered in the Flood Building in San Francisco's downtown shopping district in 1907. Ten years later, they moved into the historic 11-story, 65-metre (213 ft) Southern Pacific Building, also known as "The Landmark", located at One Market Street on the Embarcadero whose construction started in 1916. At its completion, the building's first floor was devoted to retail except for the portion facing the rear courtyard (opening to Mission Street), which was reserved for Southern Pacific. SP rented the second floor to a tenant, but occupied floors three through ten with various offices. For nearly a century, the building was topped with a large sign emblazoned with a gothic "S·P" marking the company's San Francisco roots.

The SP was known for its mammoth back shops at Sacramento, California, which was one of the few in the country equipped to design and build locomotives on a large scale. Sacramento was among the top ten largest shops in the US, occupying 200 acres of land with dozens of buildings and an average employment of 3,000, peaking at 7,000 during World War II. Other major shop sites were located at Ogden, Utah; Houston, Texas; and Algiers, New Orleans. After the 1906 earthquake destroyed much of San Francisco, including the SP shops there, new shops and yards were built six miles south of the city at Bayshore. The Alhambra Shops in Los Angeles consisted of 10 buildings and employed 1,500 but declined in importance when the Taylor Yard was built in 1930.

The SP was the defendant in the landmark 1886 United States Supreme Court case Santa Clara County v. Southern Pacific Railroad, which is often interpreted as having established certain corporate rights under the Constitution of the United States.

The Southern Pacific Railroad was replaced by the Southern Pacific Company and assumed the railroad operations of the Southern Pacific Railroad. In 1929, Southern Pacific/Texas and New Orleans operated 13,848 route-miles not including Cotton Belt, whose purchase of the Golden State Route circa 1980 nearly doubled its size to 3,085 miles (4,965 km), bringing total SP/SSW mileage to around 13,508 miles (21,739 km). The T&NO was fully merged into the SP in 1961.

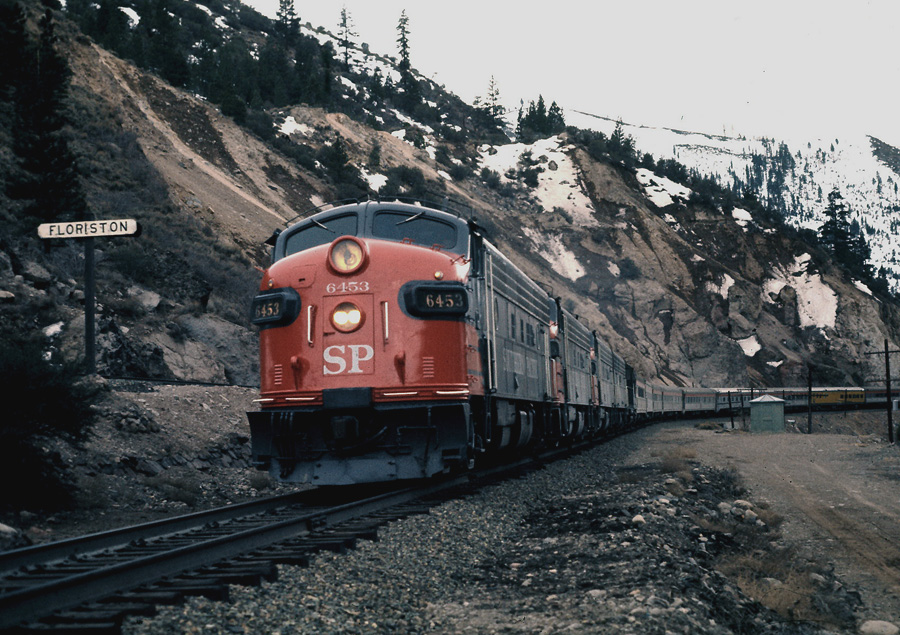
An EMD FP7 leads a Pacific Rail Society Special through Floriston, California, in February 1971.

In 1969, the Southern Pacific Transportation Company was established and took over the Southern Pacific Company; this Southern Pacific railroad is the last incarnation and was at times called "Southern Pacific Industries", though "Southern Pacific Industries" is not the official name of the company. By the 1980s, route mileage had dropped to 10,423 miles (16,774 km), mainly due to the pruning of branch lines. On October 13, 1988, the Southern Pacific Transportation Company (including its subsidiary, St. Louis Southwestern Railway) was taken over by Rio Grande Industries, the parent company that controlled the Denver and Rio Grande Western Railroad (reporting marks D&RGW). Rio Grande Industries did not merge the Southern Pacific Transportation Company and the Denver and Rio Grande Western Railroad together, but transferred direct ownership of the Denver and Rio Grande Western Railroad to the Southern Pacific Transportation Company, allowing the combined Rio Grande Industries railroad system to use the Southern Pacific name due to its brand recognition in the railroad industry and with customers of both the Southern Pacific Transportation Company and the Denver and Rio Grande Western Railroad. A long time Southern Pacific subsidiary, the St. Louis Southwestern Railway was also marketed under the Southern Pacific name. Along with the addition of the SPCSL Corporation (Note: a subsidiary of Southern Pacific Transportation Company) route from Chicago to St. Louis, the former mainline of the Chicago, Missouri and Western Railroad that once belonged to the Alton Railroad, the total length of the D&RGW/SP/SSW system was 15,959 miles (25,684 km). Rio Grande Industries was later renamed Southern Pacific Rail Corporation.

In 1977, the SP collaborated with shipping company SeaLand to develop and design the first well car, a railroad car that would carry intermodal shipping containers stacked on top of one another. Would-be merger mate, Union Pacific, ran the first double stack freight train in partnership with American President Lines from Los Angeles to New Jersey under the "Stacktrain" banner. Throughout the journey, the train was handed over to the Chicago & North Western Railway and then to Conrail.

By 1996, years of financial problems had dropped Southern Pacific's mileage to 13,715 miles (22,072 km). The financial problems caused the Southern Pacific Transportation Company to be taken over by the Union Pacific Corporation; the parent Southern Pacific Rail Corporation (formerly Rio Grande Industries), the Denver and Rio Grande Western Railroad, the St. Louis Southwestern Railway and the SPCSL Corporation were also taken over by the Union Pacific Corporation. The Union Pacific Corporation merged the Denver and Rio Grande Western Railroad, the St. Louis Southwestern Railway and the SPCSL Corporation into their Union Pacific Railroad but did not merge the Southern Pacific Transportation Company into the Union Pacific Railroad. Instead, the Union Pacific Corporation merged the Union Pacific Railroad into the Southern Pacific Transportation Company on February 1, 1998; the Southern Pacific Transportation Company became the surviving railroad and at the same time the Union Pacific Corporation renamed the Southern Pacific Transportation Company to Union Pacific Railroad. Thus, the Southern Pacific Transportation Company became, and is still operating as, the current incarnation of the Union Pacific Railroad.

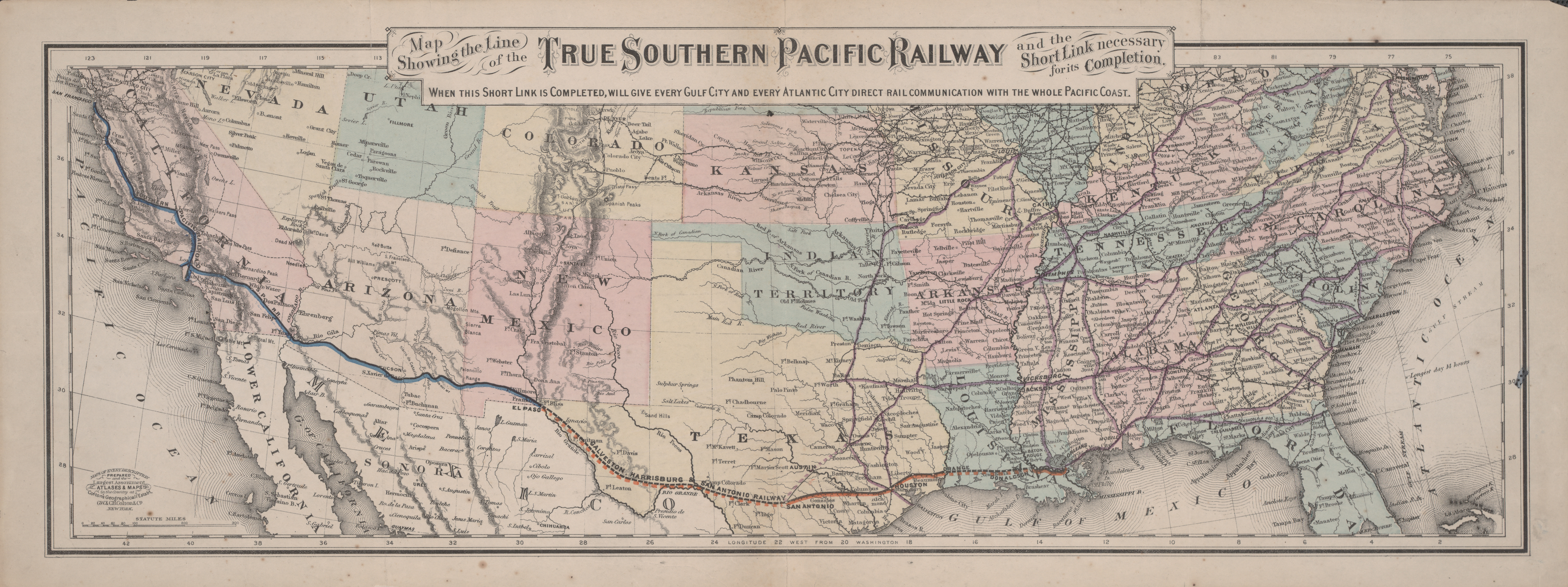
G. W. & C. B. Colton, Map Showing the Line of the True Southern Pacific Railway, showing the planned trajectory in c. 1881. The Coast Line in California was originally planned to run via Coalinga, though the company's eventual west coast route would differ from this.

== Locomotives ==
Like most railroads, the SP painted most of its steam locomotives black during the 20th century, but after 1945 SP painted the front of the locomotive's smokebox silver (almost white in appearance), with graphite colored sides, for visibility.

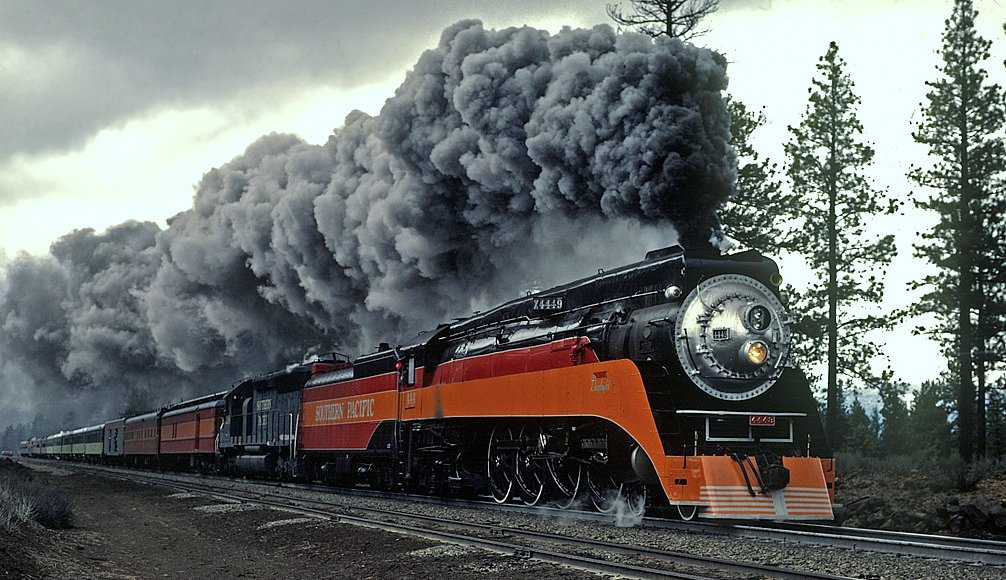
SP 4449 underway, wearing the Daylight scheme (April 1981)

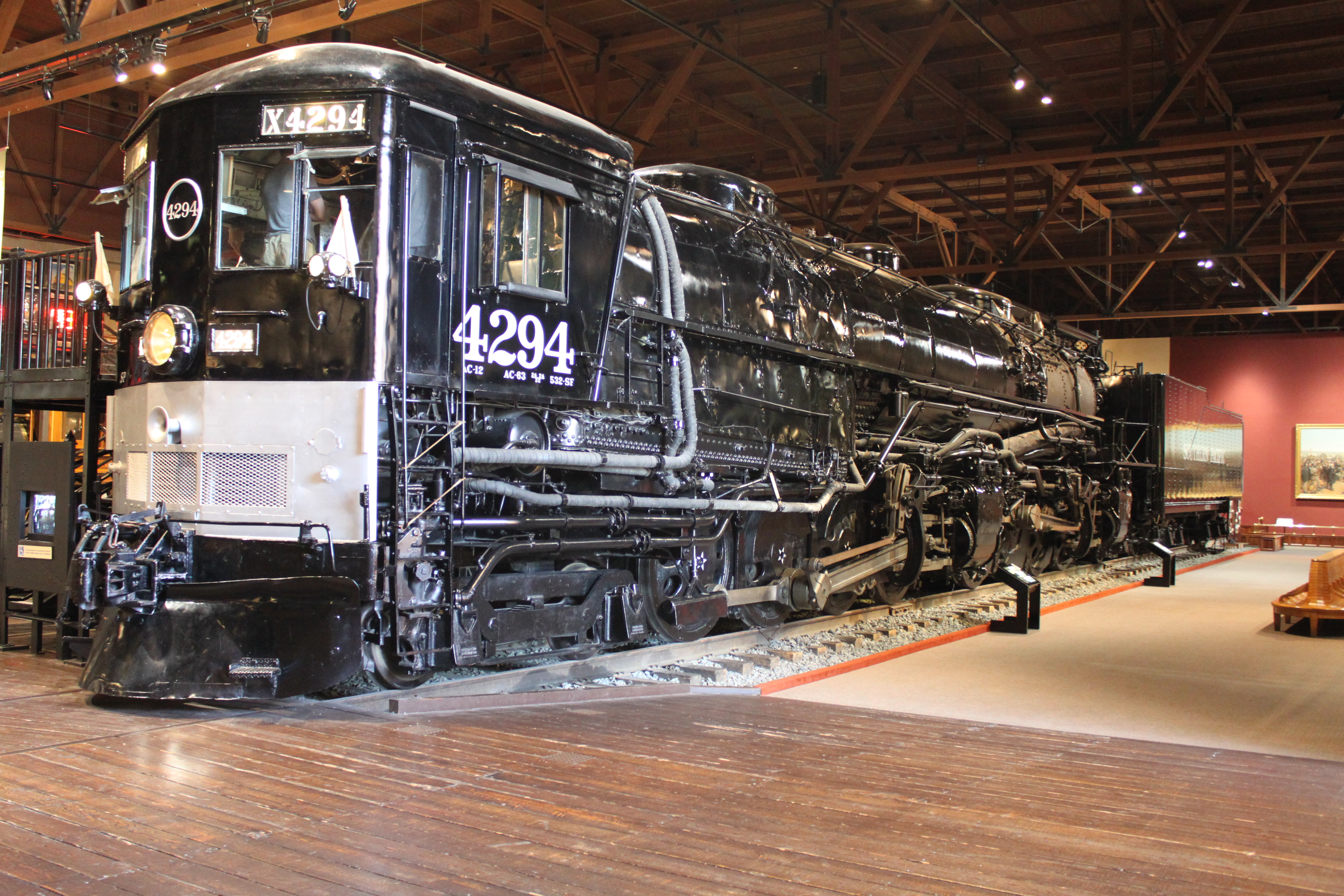
SP 4294 "cab-forward" locomotive

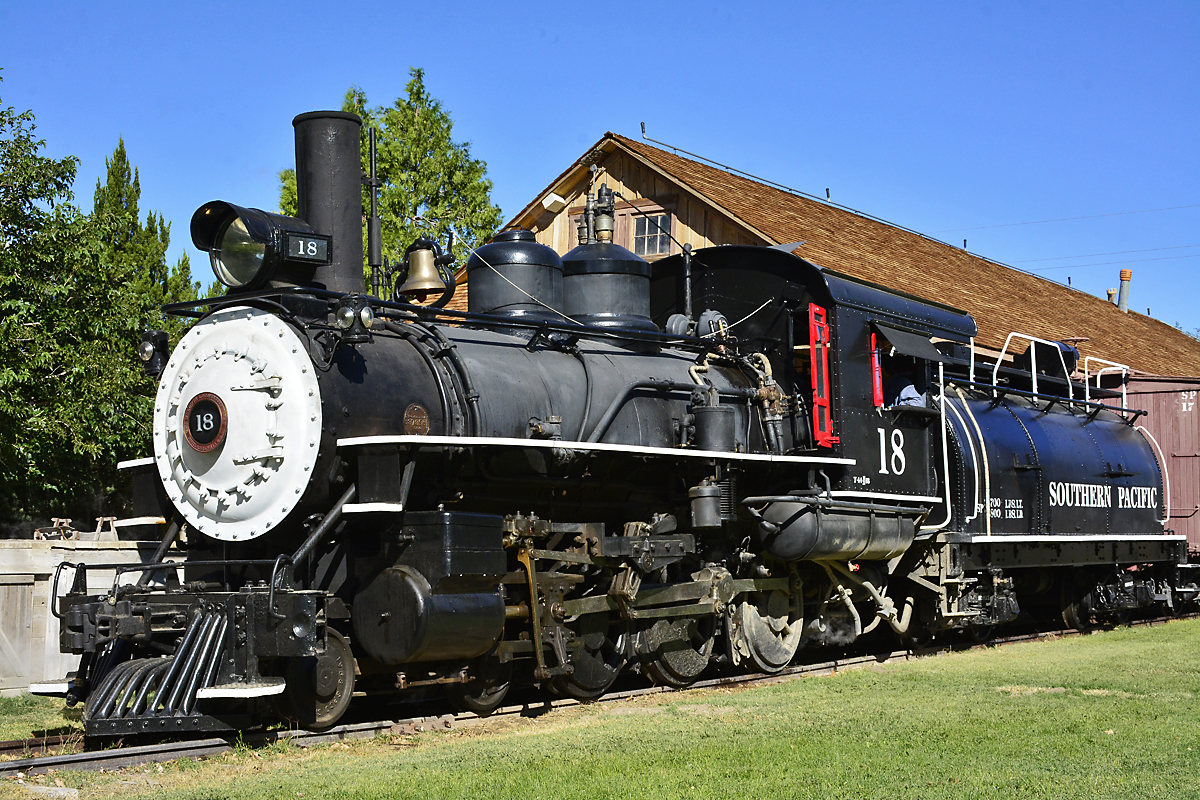
Restored SP #18 operational at Laws

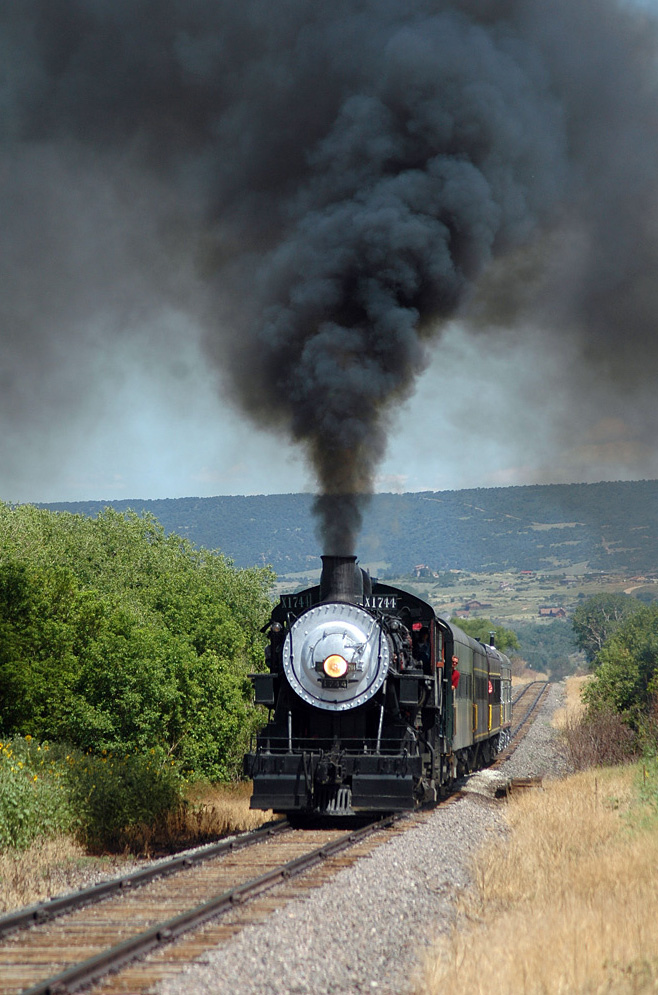
Restored No. 1744 while it operated on the Rio Grande Scenic Railroad

Some passenger steam locomotives bore the Daylight scheme, named after the trains they hauled, most of which had the word Daylight in the train name. The most famous "Daylight" locomotives were the GS-4 steam locomotives. The most famous Daylight-hauled trains were the Coast Daylight and the Sunset Limited.

Well known were the Southern Pacific's unique "cab-forward" steam locomotives. These were 4-8-8-2, 2-8-8-2, and 4-6-6-2 (rebuilt from 2-6-6-2) locomotives set up to run in reverse, with the tender attached to the smokebox end of the locomotive. Southern Pacific had snow sheds in mountain terrain, and locomotive crews nearly asphyxiated from smoke in the cab. After engineers began running their engines in reverse (pushing the tender), Southern Pacific asked Baldwin Locomotive Works to produce cab-forward designs. No other North American railroad ordered cab-forward locomotives.

=== List of locomotives used ===
==== Steam locomotives ====
- T.D. Judah - 4-2-2
- C.P. Huntington - 4-2-4T
- E class 4-4-0 - Eight Wheeler/American (various (inc. Gov. Stanford, Jupiter, Leviathan))
- A class 4-4-2 - Atlantic (A-1 – A-6)
- S class 0-6-0 - Switcher (S-1 – S-22)
- M class 2-6-0 - Mogul (M-1 – M-4 (SP 1673), M-6 (SP 1744) – M-22)
- Pr class 2-6-2 - Prairie (Pr-1)
- MM/AM-class 2-6-6-2/4-6-6-2 - Cab forward Mallet/Articulated Mogul (MM-1, MM-2/AM-2, MM-3; Convention on the SP was that Mallet referred to compound expansion, while Articulated referred to simple expansion.)
- T class 4-6-0 - Ten Wheeler (T-1 – T-31 (SP 2353, SP 2355) – T-58)
- P class 4-6-2 - Pacific (P-1 – P-8 (SP 2467, SP 2472) – P-10 (SP 2479) – P-14)
- Se class 0-8-0 - Switcher (Se-1 – Se-4)
- C class 2-8-0 - Consolidation (C-1 – C-8 (SP 2706, SP 2718), C-9 (SP 2579) – C-32)
- Mk class 2-8-2 - Mikado (Mk-2, Mk-4, Mk-5 (SP 745, SP 786) – Mk-11;
- MC/AC class - 2-8-8-2/4-8-8-2 - Cab Forward Mallet/Articulated Consolidation (MC-1/AC-1, MC-2/AC-2, AC-3, MC-4/AC-4, AC-5, MC-6/AC-6, AC-7, AC-8, AC-10, AC-11, AC-12 (SP 4294))
- AC-9 - 2-8-8-4 - Yellowstone/Articulated Consolidation
- TW-class 4-8-0 - Twelve Wheeler (Mastodon, TW-1 – TW-8)
- Mt-class 4-8-2 - Mountain (Mt-1 – Mt-5)
- GS-class 4-8-4 - Golden State/General Service ((GS-1, GS-2, GS-3, GS-4 (SP 4449), GS-5, GS-6 (SP 4460), GS-7, GS-8)
- D-class 2-10-0 - Decapod (D-1)
- F-class 2-10-2 - Fourteen Wheeler (F-1 (SP 975, SP 982) – F-5; Usually called the Santa Fe, but since the ATSF was SP's primary rival, they refused to use the name.)
- El Gobernador - 4-10-0
- SP-class 4-10-2 - Southern Pacific (SP-1 (SP 5021))

Narrow Gauge Locomotives

- 4-6-0 Ten Wheeler - See SP 18

==== Diesel locomotives ====
- ALCO PA
- ALCO RS-3
- ALCO RS-11
- ALCO RS-32
- ALCO RSD-5 (Note: rebuilt into RSD-12s and RSD-15s)
- ALCO RSD-12 (Note: rebuilt from RSD-5s)
- ALCO RSD-15 (Note: some rebuilt from RSD-5s)
- ALCO C415
- ALCO C628
- ALCO C630
- ALCO S-1
- ALCO S-2
- ALCO S-3
- ALCO S-4
- ALCO S-6
- BLW AS-616
- BLW S-12
- BLW DS-4-4-1000
- BLW DRS-6-6-1500
- BLW VO-1000
- EMC E2
- EMD E7
- EMD E8
- EMD E9 (Note: see SP 6051)
- EMD F3
- EMD F7
- EMD FP7
- EMD NW2
- EMD SW1
- EMD SW8
- EMD TR6A/TR6B
- EMD SW9
- EMD SW900
- EMD SW900E
- EMD SW1200
- EMD SW1500
- EMD MP15AC
- EMD MP15DC
- EMD GP7 (Note: SSW only)
- EMD GP9
- EMD GP9R
- EMD GP9E
- EMD SD7
- EMD SD7R
- EMD SD9
- EMD SD9E
- EMD SD40M-2
- EMD SD39
- EMD SD38-2
- EMD SD35
- EMD SD35R
- EMD SDP45
- EMD GP60
- EMD GP40
- EMD GP40P-2
- EMD GP40M-2
- EMD GP40-2
- EMD GP40X
- EMD GP38-2
- EMD GP35
- EMD GP35E
- EMD GP35R
- EMD GP20
- EMD GP30
- EMD SD50 (Note: Seven units owned by the D&RGW, repainted into SP colors (with D&RGW sub-lettering) after SP was acquired by Rio Grande Industries in 1988)
- EMD SD45
- EMD SD45R
- EMD SD45T-2
- EMD SD45T-2R
- EMD SD40T-2
- EMD SD40
- EMD SD40R
- EMD SD70M
- EMD SD44R
- EMD DD35
- FM H-12-44
- FM H-24-66 "Train Master"
- GE 44-ton switcher
- GE 70-ton switcher
- GE AC4400CW
- GE B23-7
- GE B30-7
- GE B36-7
- GE B39-8
- GE B40-8
- GE C44-9W
- GE P30CH (Note: leased from Amtrak)
- GE U25B
- GE U25BE
- GE U28B
- GE U28C
- GE U30C
- GE U33C
- GE U50
- Krauss-Maffei ML 4000
- M-K TE70-4S

== Passenger train service ==
Until May 1, 1971 (when Amtrak took over long-distance passenger operations in the United States), the Southern Pacific at various times operated the following named passenger trains. Trains with names in italicized bold text still operate under Amtrak:

- 49er
- Acadian
- Apache (Note: operated jointly with the Rock Island Railroad (1926–1938))
- Argonaut
- Arizona Limited (Note: operated jointly with the Rock Island Railroad)
- Beaver
- Californian
- Cascade (Note: operates today as part of the Coast Starlight train)
- City of San Francisco (Note: operated jointly with the Chicago and North Western Railway and the Union Pacific Railroad; SP portion operates today as part of Amtrak's California Zephyr)
- Coast Daylight (Note: operates today as part of the Coast Starlight train)
- Coast Mail
- Coaster
- Coos Bay Limited
- Del Monte
- Fast Mail
- Golden Rocket (Note: proposed, was to have been operated jointly with the Chicago, Rock Island and Pacific Railroad)
- Golden State (Note: operated jointly with the Chicago, Rock Island and Pacific Railroad)
- Grand Canyon
- Hustler
- Imperial (Note: operated jointly with the Rock Island Railroad 1946–1967))
- Inside Track Flyer
- Klamath
- Lark
- Newsboy
- Oil Fields Flyer
- Oregonian
- Overland
- Owl Limited
- Pacific Limited
- Peninsula Commute (Note: operated until 1985, now Caltrain)
  - Loop Service
- Rogue River
- Sacramento Daylight
- San Francisco Challenger (Note: operated jointly with the Chicago and North Western Railway and the Union Pacific Railroad)
- San Joaquin Daylight
- San Jose Limited
- Seashore Express
- Senator
- Shasta Daylight
- Shasta Express
- Shasta Limited
- Shasta Limited De Luxe
- Shore Line Limited
- Starlight
- Statesman
- Sunbeam
- Sunset Limited
- Suntan Special
- Tehachapi
- West Coast
- El Costeño (Note: operated from 1927 till 1949 as an international train under the subsidiary Southern Pacific Railroad of Mexico between Tucson and Guadalajara, featuring through sleepers from Los Angeles to Mexico City)
- El Yaqui (Note: operated from 1927 till 1951 as an international train under the subsidiary Southern Pacific Railroad of Mexico between Tucson and Guadalajara)

== Notable accidents ==
- On March 28, 1907, the Southern Pacific Sunset Express, descending the grade out of the San Timoteo Canyon, entered the Colton rail yard traveling about 60 miles per hour (97 km/h), hit an open switch and careened off the track, resulting in 24 fatalities. Accounts said 9 of the train's 14 cars disintegrated as they piled on top of one another, leaving the dead and injured in "a heap of kindling and crumpled metal". Of the dead, 18 were Italian immigrants traveling to jobs in San Francisco from Genoa, Italy.
- The Coast Line Limited was heading for Los Angeles, on May 22, 1907, when it was derailed just west of Glendale, California. Passenger cars reportedly tumbled down the embankment. At least 2 people were killed and others injured. "The horrible deed was planned with devilish accurateness" the Pasadena Star News reported at the time. It said spikes were removed from the track and a hook placed under the end of the rail. The Star's coverage was extensive and its editorial blasted the criminal elements behind the wreck:
  The man or men who committed this horrible deed near Glendale may not be anarchists, technically speaking. But if they are sane men, moved by motive, they are such stuff as anarchists are made of. If the typical anarchist conceived that a railroad corporation should be terrorized, he would not scruple to wreck a passenger train and send scores and hundreds to instant death.
- On October 11, 1923, The DeAutremont Brothers held up SP Train #13 as it made its way through the Siskyou Mountains of southern Oregon. Thinking the train had gold on it, they killed all 4 crew members and blew up the mail car inside tunnel 13 at the summit. There was no gold on board. They were caught in 1927 and jailed. This was known as the last great train hold up in America
- On April 8, 1935, following torrential rains and flooding that washed out sections of track, a 14 man Southern Pacific work crew in railcars collided with a gravel car in the darkness in Roseville, California, resulting in 11 deaths.
- On New Year's Eve 1944, a rear-end collision west of Ogden in thick fog killed 48 people.
- On January 17, 1947, the Southern Pacific Nightflier wrecked 12 miles (19 km) outside of Bakersfield; 7 people were killed and over 50 injured. Four coaches and a tourist sleeper were overturned, landing far off the tracks; the other seven cars remained upright. The locomotive stayed on the tracks and its crew was uninjured. A 29-year-old passenger, Robert Crowley from Miami, Florida, had been conversing with a man across the aisle who was killed instantly. Crowley, who was a combat war veteran, said “I never saw such a mess” even on a battlefield.
- On May 8, 1948, in Monterey, California, a Southern Pacific passenger train, the Del Monte Express, struck a car driven by influential marine biologist Ed Ricketts at the now defunct railroad crossing at Drake Avenue. Ricketts succumbed to his injuries three days later in the hospital.
- On September 17, 1963, a Southern Pacific freight train crashed into an illegally converted bus at a grade crossing in Chualar, California, killing 32 bracero workers. It would later be a factor in the decision by Congress in 1964 to terminate the bracero program, despite its strong support among farmers. It also helped spur the Chicano civil rights movement. As of 2014, it was the deadliest automobile accident in United States history, according to the National Safety Council.
- On April 28, 1973, a Southern Pacific freight train carrying munitions exploded in Roseville Yard injuring 52 people, the cause of this was due to a hot box on a railcar setting the floor ablaze, heating a bomb until it detonated.
- On May 12, 1989, a Southern Pacific train, SP 7551 East carrying trona derailed in San Bernardino, California. The train failed to slow while descending a nearby slope, and sped up to about 110 miles per hour (180 km/h) before derailing, causing the San Bernardino train disaster. The crash destroyed 7 homes along Duffy Street and killed 2 train workers and 2 residents. Thirteen days later on May 25, 1989, an underground pipeline running along the right-of-way ruptured and caught fire due to damage done to the pipeline during cleanup from the derailment or from the derailment itself, destroying 11 more homes and killing 2 more people.
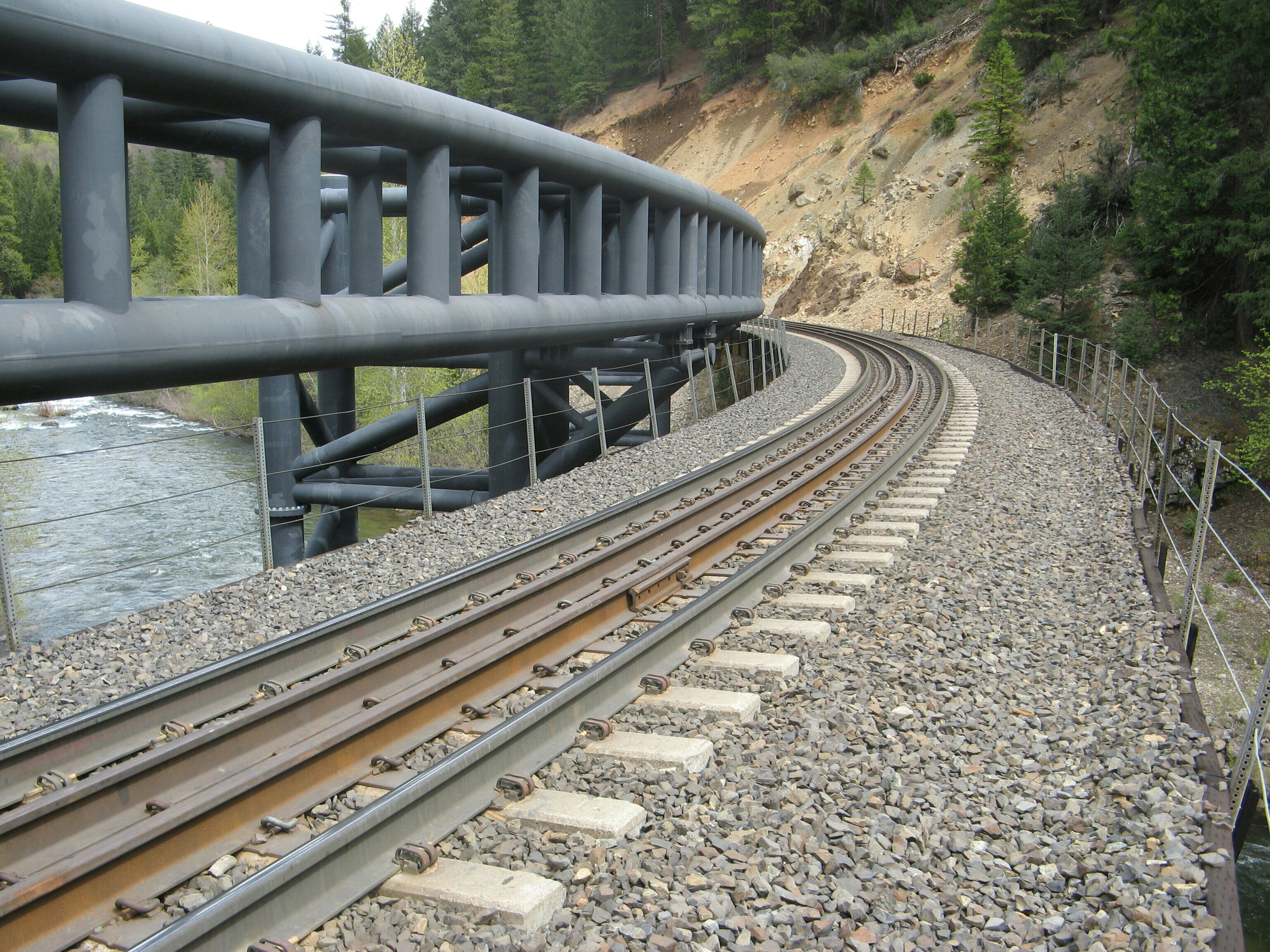
- Site of the 1991 spill. The guardrail on the left was constructed after the spill.
  On the night of July 14, 1991, a Southern Pacific train derailed into the upper Sacramento River at a sharp bend of track called "the Cantara Loop", upstream from Dunsmuir, California, in Siskiyou County. Several cars made contact with the water, including a tank car. Early in the morning of July 15, it became apparent that the tank car had ruptured and spilled its entire contents into the river – approximately 19,000 US gallons (72 m^{3}) of metam sodium, a soil fumigant. Ultimately, over a million fish, and tens of thousands of amphibians and crayfish were killed. Millions of aquatic invertebrates, including insects and mollusks, which form the basis of the river's ecosystem, were destroyed. Hundreds of thousands of willows, alders, and cottonwoods eventually died; many more were severely injured.
  The chemical plume left a 41-mile (66 km) wake of destruction from the spill site to the entry point of the river into Shasta Lake. The accident still ranks as the largest hazardous chemical spill in California history. At the time of the incident, metam sodium was not classified as a hazardous material.

== Preserved locomotives ==
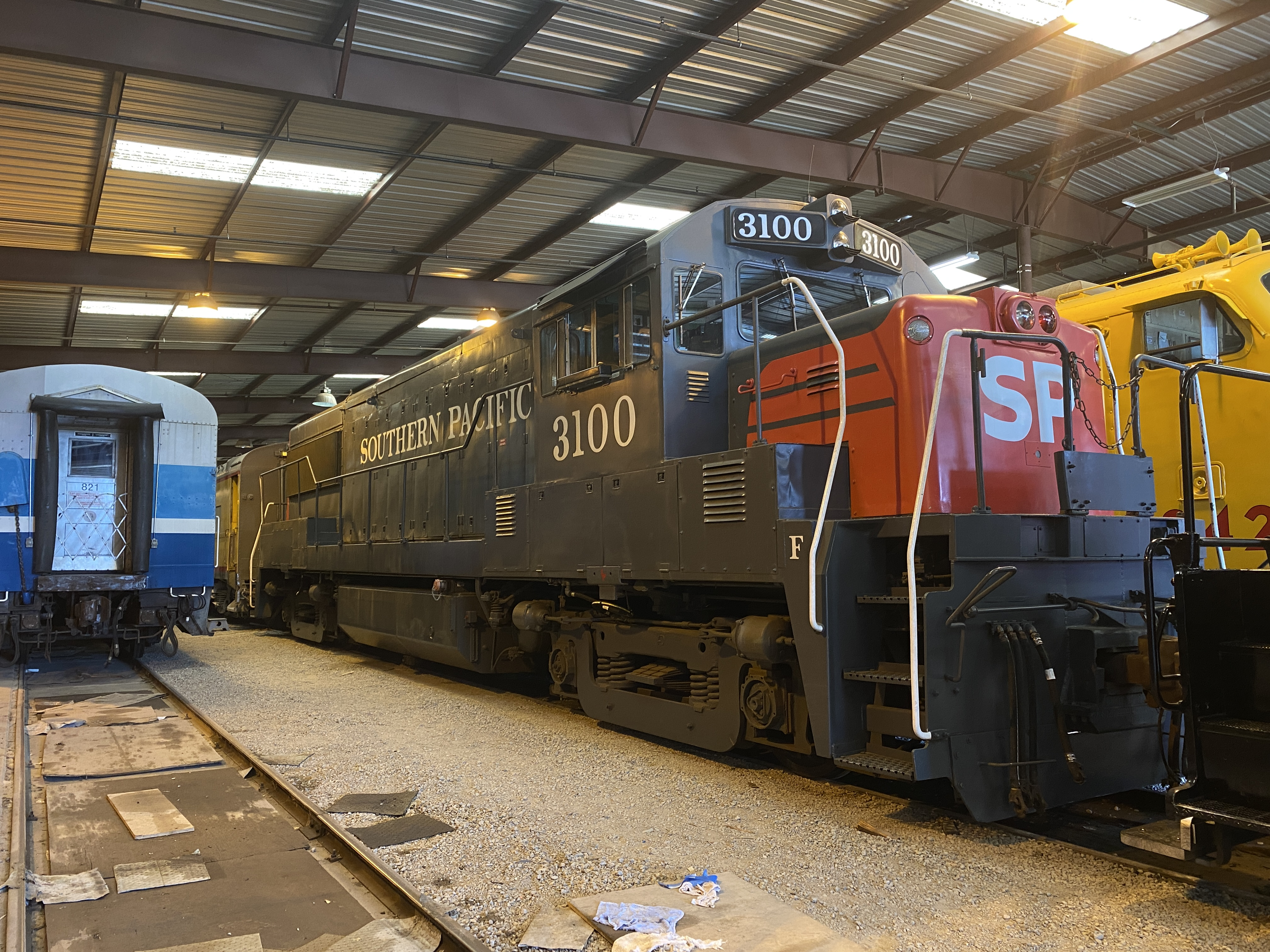
Southern Pacific 3100 at the Southern California Railway Museum, is the only U25B in existence that is operational.

There are many Southern Pacific locomotives still in revenue service with railroads such as the Union Pacific Railroad, and many older and special locomotives have been donated to parks and museums, or continue operating on scenic or tourist railroads. Most of the engines now in use with Union Pacific have been "patched", where the SP logo on the front is replaced by a Union Pacific shield, and new numbers are applied over the old numbers with a Union Pacific sticker, however some engines remain in Southern Pacific "bloody nose" paint. Over the past couple years, most of the patched units were repainted into the full Union Pacific scheme and as of January 2019, less than ten units remain in their old paint. Among the more notable equipment is:

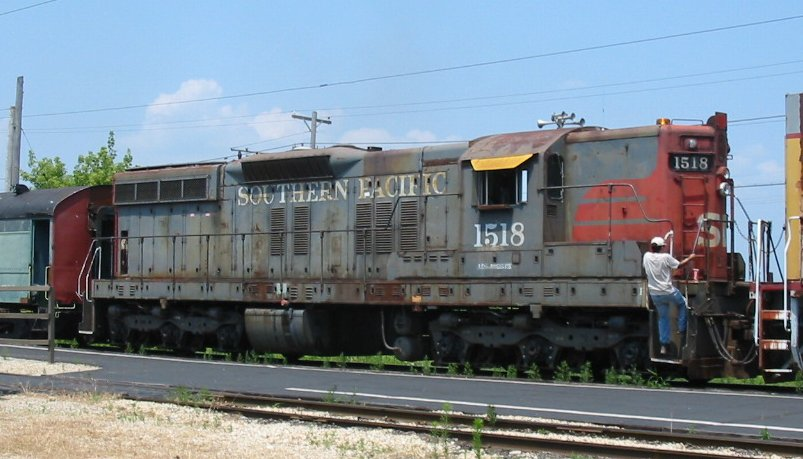
SP 1518 at IRM, July 2005

- 745 (Mk-5, 2-8-2), owned by the Louisiana Rail Heritage Trust, operated by the Louisiana Steam Train Association, and based in Jefferon (near New Orleans), Louisiana
- 786 (Mk-5, 2-8-2), owned by the City of Austin, leased to the Austin Steam Train Association. Currently under full mechanical restoration in Austin, Texas.
- 794 (Mk-5, 2-8-2), the last Mikado built for the Texas and New Orleans Railroad in 1916 out of spare parts in their Houston shops. It currently resides with cosmetic restoration at San Antonio Station, San Antonio, Texas, but plans are to restore it to operating condition.
- 982 (F-1, 2-10-2), tender located at the Heber Valley Railroad in Heber City, Utah, main locomotive located in Houston, Texas.
- 1518 (EMD SD7), former EMD demonstrator 990 and first SD7 built, located at the Illinois Railway Museum, Union, Illinois
- 1744 (M-6, 2-6-0), components slowly being gathered at Brightside, California for a restoration to operating condition on the Niles Canyon Railway.
- 2248 Puffy (T-1, 4-6-0), operated by the Grapevine Vintage Railroad, but is currently undergoing a 1,472-day overhaul required by the FRA in Grapevine, Texas.
- 2353 (T-31, 4-6-0), on display at the Pacific Southwest Railway Museum in Campo, California.
- 2467 (P-8, 4-6-2), on loan by the Pacific Locomotive Association, Fremont, California to the California State Railroad Museum
- 2472 (P-8, 4-6-2), owned and operated by the Golden Gate Railroad Museum, Redwood City, California
- 2479 (P-10, 4-6-2), owned and being restored by the California Trolley and Railroad Corporation, San Jose, California
- 2718 (C-8, 2-8-0), on display at the Modoc County Museum in Alturas, California
- 3100 (former SP6800 Bicentennial), U25B owned and operated by the Southern California Railway Museum, Perris, CA
- 3420 (C-19, 2-8-0), owned by El Paso Historic Board, stored at Phelps Dodge copper refinery, El Paso, Texas
- 3709 (EMD GP9), being restored to operation at Pacific Southwest Railway Museum in Campo, California
- 3769 (EMD GP9), On display and used as a switch engine for the Utah State Railroad Museum in Ogden, Utah.
- 4294 (AC-12, 4-8-8-2), located at the California State Railroad Museum, Sacramento, California
- 4449 (GS-4, 4-8-4), formerly located at the Brooklyn Roundhouse before being relocated to the Oregon Rail Heritage Center in June 2012, Portland, Oregon
- 4460 (GS-6, 4-8-4), located at the National Museum of Transportation, Kirkwood, Missouri
- 5021 (SP-2, 4-10-2), located at the RailGiants Museum in Fairplex, Pomona, California
- 5119 (GE 70-ton switcher), Operational and awaiting paint restoration to SP colors at Pacific Southwest Railway Museum in Campo, California
- 7304 (ALCO RS-32), on display awaiting restoration at Pacific Southwest Railway Museum in Campo, California
- 7457 (EMD SD45) the first GM Electro-Motive Division SD45 diesel-electric road switcher locomotive to be built for that railroad in 1966. It last saw service on Donner Pass. It was donated to the Utah State Railroad Museum in 2002.

== Honorary tribute ==
On August 19, 2006, UP unveiled a brand-new EMD SD70ACe locomotive, Union Pacific 1996, as part of a new heritage program. It was the final unit in UP's Heritage Series of locomotives, and was painted in a color scheme inspired by the "Daylight" and "Black Widow" schemes.

== Company officers ==
=== Presidents ===
- Timothy Guy Phelps (1865–1868)
- Charles Crocker (1868–1885)
- Leland Stanford (1885–1890)
- Collis P. Huntington (1890–1900)
- Charles Melville Hays (1900–1901)
- E. H. Harriman (1901–1909)
- Robert S. Lovett (1909–1911)
- William Sproule (1911–1918)
- Julius Kruttschnitt (1918–1920)
- William Sproule (1920–1928)
- Paul Shoup (1929–1932)
- Angus Daniel McDonald (1932–1941)
- Armand Mercier (1941–1951)
- Donald J. Russell (1952–1964)
- Benjamin F. Biaggini (1964–1976)
- Denman McNear (1976–1979)
- Alan Furth (1979–1982)
- Robert Krebs (1982–1988)
- D. M. "Mike" Mohan (1988–1993)
- Edward L. Moyers (1993–1995)
- Jerry R. Davis (1995–1996)

=== Chairmen of Executive Committee ===
- Leland Stanford (1890–1893)
- (vacant 1893–1909)
- Robert S. Lovett (1909–1913)
- Julius Kruttschnitt (1913–1925)
- Henry deForest (1925–1928)
- Hale Holden (1928–1932)

=== Chairmen of Board of Directors ===
- Henry deForest (1929–1932)
- Hale Holden (1932–1939)
- (position nonexistent 1939–1964)
- Donald J. Russell (1964–1972)
- Benjamin F. Biaggini (1976–1982)
- Denman K. McNear (1982–1988)
- Edward L. Moyers (1993–1995) Chairman/C.E.O.

== Notable employees ==
- Carl Ingold Jacobson, Los Angeles, California, City Council member, 1925–33
- Blake R. Van Leer, President of Georgia Tech, United States Army officer and hydraulic process inventor
- Charles Wright, land surveyor for the railway, before becoming a botanist
- Jack Kerouac, novelist
- Harry K. McClintock, singer-songwriter, The Big Rock Candy Mountains
- Jimmie Rodgers, Father of Country Music, singer-songwriter

== See also ==
- History of rail transportation in California
- El Paso and Southwestern Railroad
- Long Wharf (Santa Monica)
- Mussel Slough Tragedy
- Pacific Fruit Express
- Santa Fe–Southern Pacific merger
- Southern Pacific 7399
- Southern Pacific 4449
- Southern Pacific Depot
- St. Louis Southwestern Railway
- Texas and New Orleans Railroad
- TOPS (Total Operations Processing System), rolling stock management system jointly developed with IBM and Stanford University and used by SP until 1980, still used by British Rail and successor system

== Notes ==
List 1

List 2
