= Southern Pacific class MC-1 =

Class of two American 2-8-8-2 Mallet locomotives

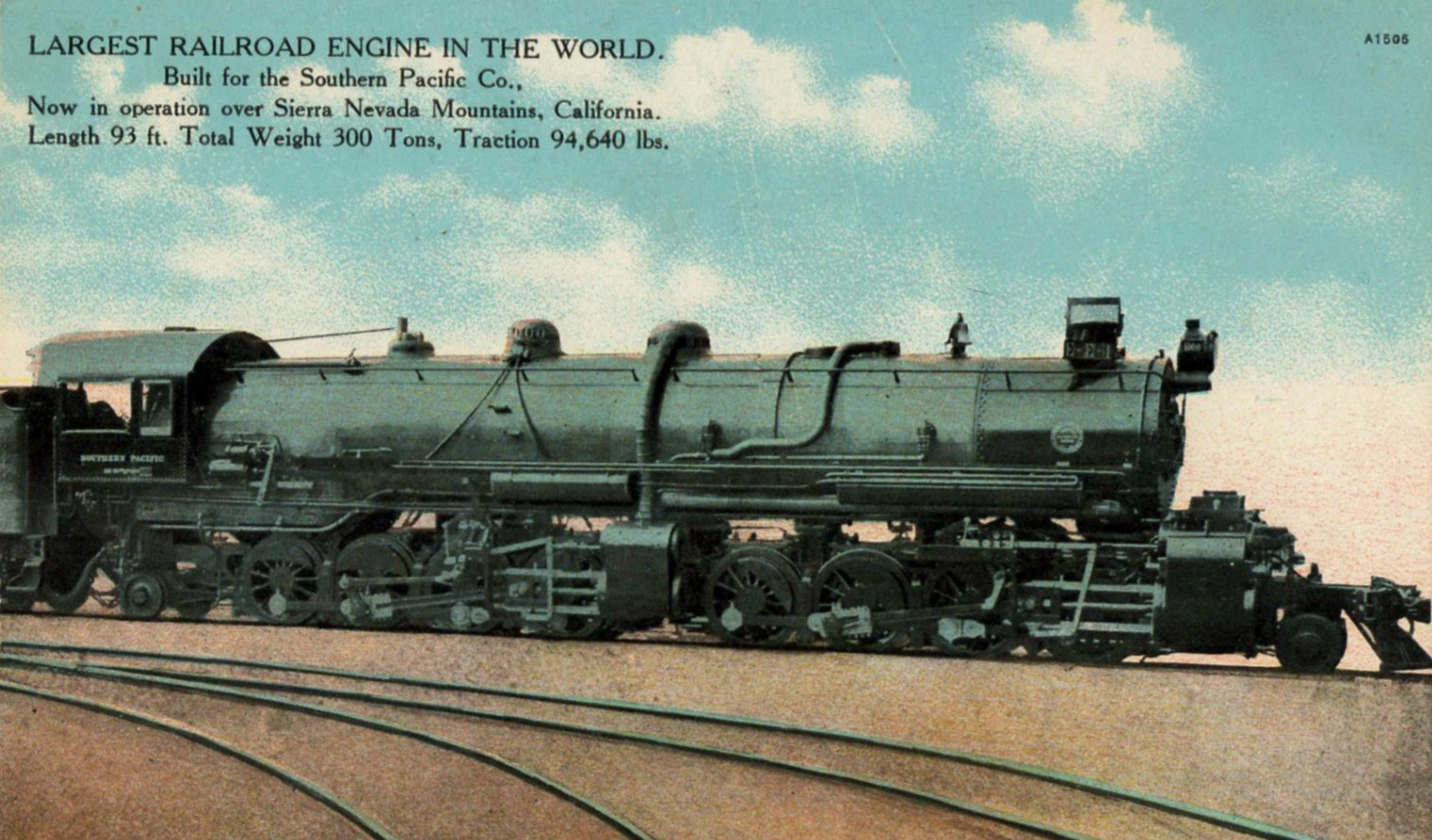
- Number 4000 before it was converted to a cab forward locomotive.
Type and origin
- Power type: Steam
- Builder: Baldwin Locomotive Works
- Serial number: 33340, 33341
- Build date: April 1909
Specifications
- Configuration
  - Whyte: 2-8-8-2
- Gauge: 4 ft 8 1/2 in (1,435 mm) standard gauge
- Driver dia.: 57 in (1.448 m)
- Adhesive weight: 394,150 lb (178,780 kg)
- Loco weight: 425,900 lb (193,200 kg)
- Boiler pressure: 200 psi (1.4 MPa)
- High-pressure cylinder: 26 in × 30 in (660 mm × 762 mm)
- Low-pressure cylinder: 40 in × 30 in (1,016 mm × 762 mm)
Performance figures
- Tractive effort: 94,880 lbf (422.0 kN)
Career
- Operators: Southern Pacific Railroad
- Class: MC-1
- Number in class: 2
- Numbers: 4000, 4001
- First run: May 26, 1909
- Retired: 1948
- Disposition: scrapped

Southern Pacific Railroad's MC-1 class of steam locomotive consisted of two locomotives built by Baldwin Locomotive Works in April 1909. They are the first two locomotives converted by Southern Pacific (SP) to run as cab forward locomotives.

The first of these two, number 4000, entered service on May 26, 1909. It was rebuilt as a cab forward and reclassified as an MC-2 in June 1923. Another rebuild on June 4, 1931, "simpled" it with uniform cylinders and reclassified it as an AC-1. 4000 was scrapped on April 2, 1948. The second locomotive in this class, 4001, entered service on May 30, 1909. It was rebuilt as an MC-2 in April 1923, "simpled" on February 9, 1931, retired from active service on May 23, 1947, and scrapped on June 14, 1947, at SP's Sacramento shops.
