= Southern Pacific class AC-1 =

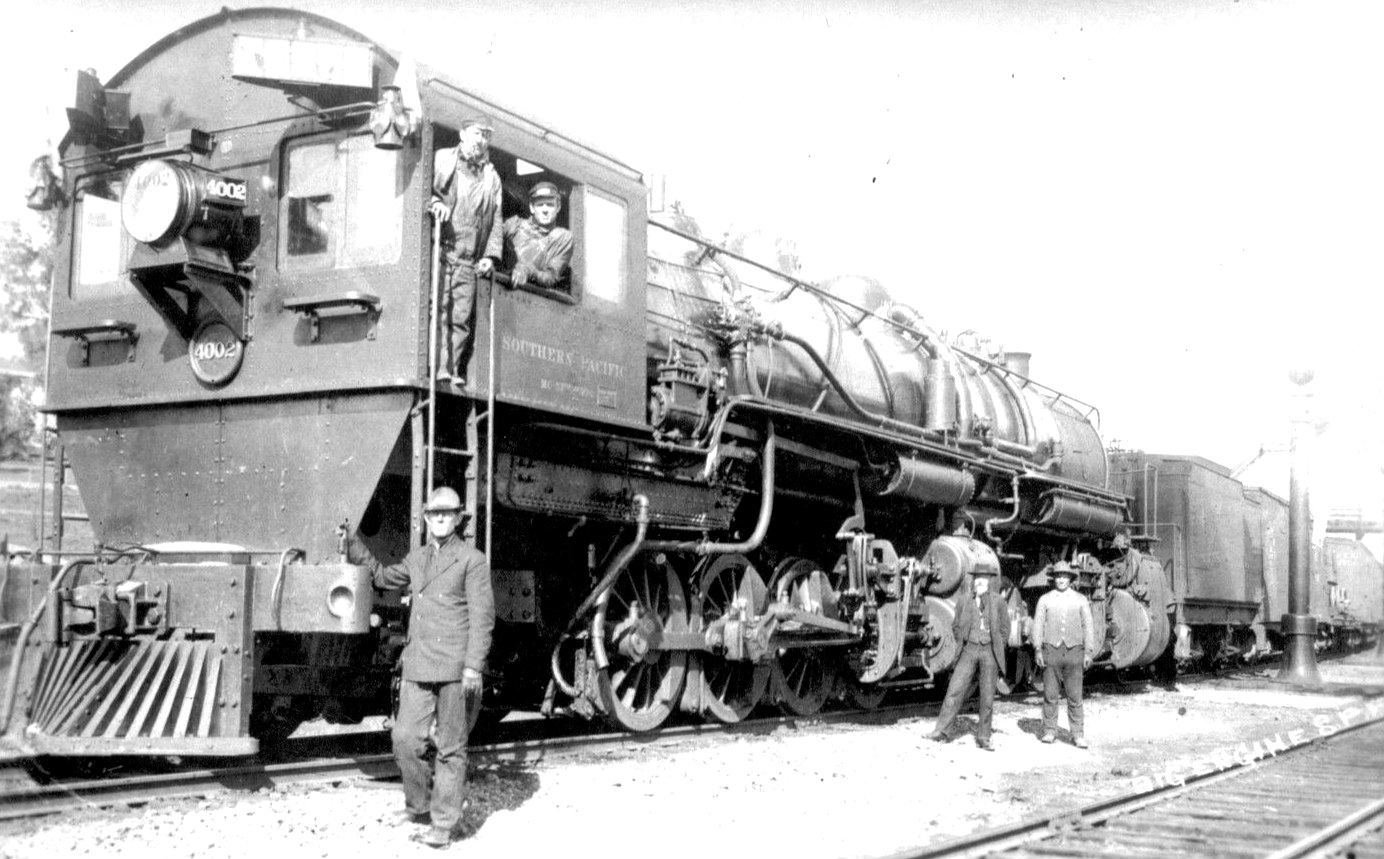
- Southern Pacific No. 4002
Type and origin
- Power type: Steam
Specifications
- Configuration
  - Whyte: 2-8-8-2
- Gauge: 4 ft 8 1/2 in (1,435 mm) standard gauge
- Driver dia.: 57 in (1,448 mm)
- Adhesive weight: 440,800 lb (199,900 kg)
- Loco weight: 481,200 lb (218,300 kg)
- Boiler pressure: 210 psi (1,400 kPa)
- Feedwater heater: 4 1/4-BL Worthington
- Cylinder size: 22 in × 30 in (559 mm × 762 mm) dia × stroke
Performance figures
- Tractive effort: 90,940 lbf (404.5 kN)
Career
- Operators: Southern Pacific Railroad
- Class: AC-1
- Number in class: 15
- Numbers: 4000 – 4010, 4012, 4014 – 4016
- Retired: 1947 – 1948
- Disposition: All scrapped

Southern Pacific Railroad's AC-1 class of cab forward steam locomotives consisted of locomotives rebuilt from MC-1 and MC-2 class locomotives that were originally built by Baldwin Locomotive Works in 1909. The MC-2 class was the first class of locomotives built and delivered to SP as cab forward locomotives in late 1909. The AC-1 class was the first of the successful AC series of cab forward locomotives that numbered nearly 200 in total on the SP. Southern Pacific No. 4002 was rebuilt in June 1923 as a Cab Forward.

Their rebuilds into class AC-1 was around June 1931. SP used the rebuilt locomotives through the traffic rush of World War II, then the SP removed them from the roster soon after the war. They were all retired from active service by 1949 and were scrapped soon after their retirement. The last locomotive of this class that was scrapped was number 4014 on April 12, 1949. None of the original AC-1's were preserved. The only cab forward left in the United States of America is SP No. 4294, an AC-12 built in March 1944.
