= Southern Pacific 982 =

American 2-10-2 steam locomotive

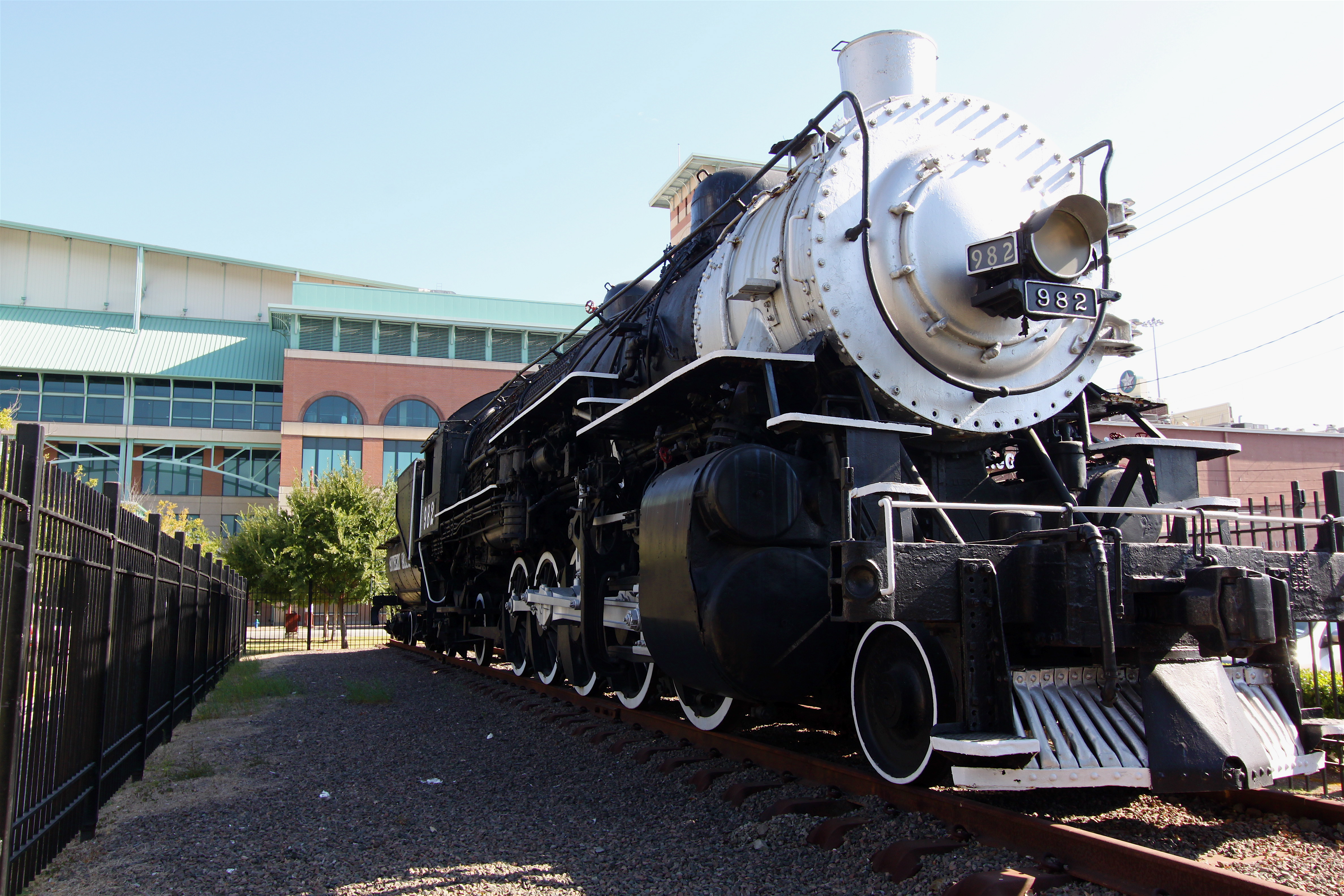
Type and origin
- Power type: Steam
- Builder: Baldwin Locomotive Works
- Serial number: 52053
- Build date: July 1919
Specifications
- Configuration
  - Whyte: 2-10-2
  - UIC: 1′E1′
- Gauge: 4 ft 8 1/2 in (1,435 mm) standard gauge
- Driver dia.: 63 in (1.600 m)
- Length: 94 ft 10 in (28.91 m)
- Width: 10 ft 5 in (3.18 m)
- Axle load: 56,400 lb (25,600 kg; 25.6 t)
- Adhesive weight: 282,000 lb (128,000 kg; 128 t)
- Loco weight: 352,000 lb (160,000 kg; 160 t)
- Total weight: 525,500 lb (238,400 kg; 238.4 t)
- Fuel type: New: Coal; Now: Oil
- Fuel capacity: 3,839 US gal (14,530 L; 3,197 imp gal)
- Water cap.: 10,030 US gal (38,000 L; 8,350 imp gal)
- Firebox
  - Grate area: 63 sq ft (5.9 m^{2})
- Boiler pressure: 200 lbf/in^{2} (1.38 MPa)
- Heating surface: 4,462 sq ft (414.5 m^{2})
- Superheater
  - Heating area: 950 sq ft (88 m^{2})
- Cylinders: Two, outside
- Cylinder size: 27.5 in × 32 in (698 mm × 813 mm)
- Valve gear: Walschaerts
Performance figures
- Tractive effort: 65,300 lbf (290.5 kN)
- Factor of adh.: 4.19
Career
- Operators: Texas and New Orleans Railroad
- Class: F-1
- Numbers: SP 3651; SP 982
- Retired: 1956
- Preserved: May 1957
- Disposition: In storage, awaiting relocation

Southern Pacific 982 is a F-1 class 2-10-2 "Santa Fe" type steam locomotive built by Baldwin (BLW) in 1919 for the Southern Pacific Co. (SP)

== History ==
No. 982 was built by the Baldwin Locomotive Works (BLW) in 1919 for the Southern Pacific Co. (SP) as No. 3651. The locomotive spent most of its career hauling heavy freight trains on the Southern Pacific Railroad (SP) until November 1922, when it was transferred to the Texas & New Orleans Railroad (TNO) and renumbered as No. 982.

No. 982 was retired from revenue service in 1956 and the following year in May 1957, it was donated to the City of Houston, Texas and Houston Jaycees, where it used to be on static display at the Hermann Park Conservancy. Later on, the City of Houston would transform the area near the lake into the Hermann Park Cultural Plaza, with a café, a covered plaza, and public art pieces. In 2005, it was moved to the site of Houston's former Union Station, now the Daikin Park, where it remained for a number of years. In June 2013, the engine was gifted to the Nau Center for Texas Cultural Heritage and was moved to the Get Big Things Done gallery for static display.

In 2019, the TRPA was awarded No. 982 with support of the Houston Astros and the City of Houston. In 2022, the TRPA acquired the former Great Northern 2100's tender, which was a larger more long distance Vanderbilt tender that was not only historic but accurate to the class of locomotive by Baldwin for SP long distance. The group is currently preparing to relocate to permanent more public enticing home, and has found interest from local railroads in Texas.

On May 4, 2024, No. 982's 5-chime whistle was temporarily outfitted onto Grand Canyon Railway 4960 while pulling an excursion for benefit of No. 982's restoration.

As of February 2025 it is on a private siding awaiting transfer to a new location in the next few months according to www.trpahouston.org. It had displayed without its tender, which had been moved to the Heber Valley Railroad (HVRX) in Utah.
