= Goat Canyon Trestle =

Historic wooden railway bridge in southern California, United States

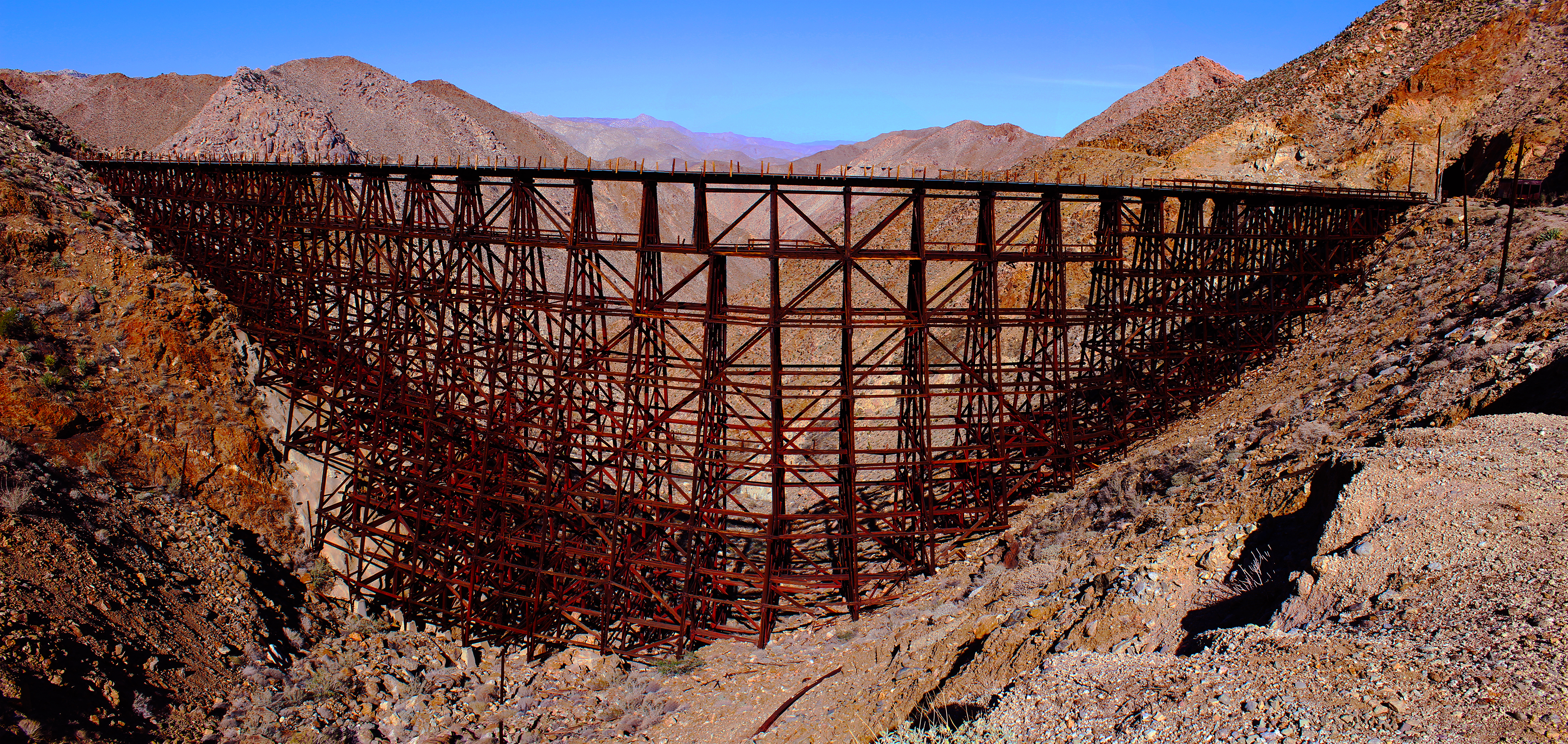
- Trestle as seen from the southeast in 2016
- Coordinates: 32°43′45″N 116°11′00″W
- Crosses: Goat Canyon
- Locale: Anza-Borrego Desert State Park
- Other name: Goat Canyon Railroad Trestle
- Owner: San Diego Metropolitan Transit System
- Heritage status: San Diego Historic Civil Engineering Landmark

Characteristics
- Material: Redwood
- Total length: 597–750 ft (182–229 m)
- Height: 186–200 ft (57–61 m)

History
- Construction start: 1932
- Construction end: 1933
- Replaces: Tunnel number 15

Location
- Interactive map of Goat Canyon Trestle

Goat Canyon Trestle is a wooden trestle in San Diego County, California. At a length of 597–750 feet (182–229 m), it is the world's largest all-wood trestle. Goat Canyon Trestle was built in 1933 as part of the San Diego and Arizona Eastern Railway, after one of the many tunnels through the Carrizo Gorge collapsed. The railway had been called the "impossible railroad" upon its 1919 completion. The railway runs through Baja California and eastern San Diego County before ending at Plaster City in the Imperial Valley. The trestle was made of wood, rather than metal, due to temperature fluctuations in the Carrizo Gorge. By 2008, most rail traffic stopped using the trestle.

== Background ==
Under the direction of John D. Spreckels, construction of the San Diego and Arizona Eastern Railroad began in 1907. It was backed by Edward Henry Harriman at the urging of President Theodore Roosevelt. Engineers called the route "impossible" as it crossed the Colorado Desert and through the Jacumba Mountains. In 1919, the railroad was completed, connecting San Diego with the Imperial Valley, by way of Mexico. Before the construction of the railroad, the only rail connection to San Diego was from the north, via Los Angeles, which was only completed in the late 19th century. The new railway provided a connection to the Southern Pacific Railroad, instead of going north on the Atchison, Topeka and Santa Fe Railway. At the opening of the railway, and prior to the construction of the Goat Canyon Trestle, the most significant bridge on the route was the Campo Creek Viaduct, which is 600 feet (180 m) long and 200 feet (61 m) high above the ground.

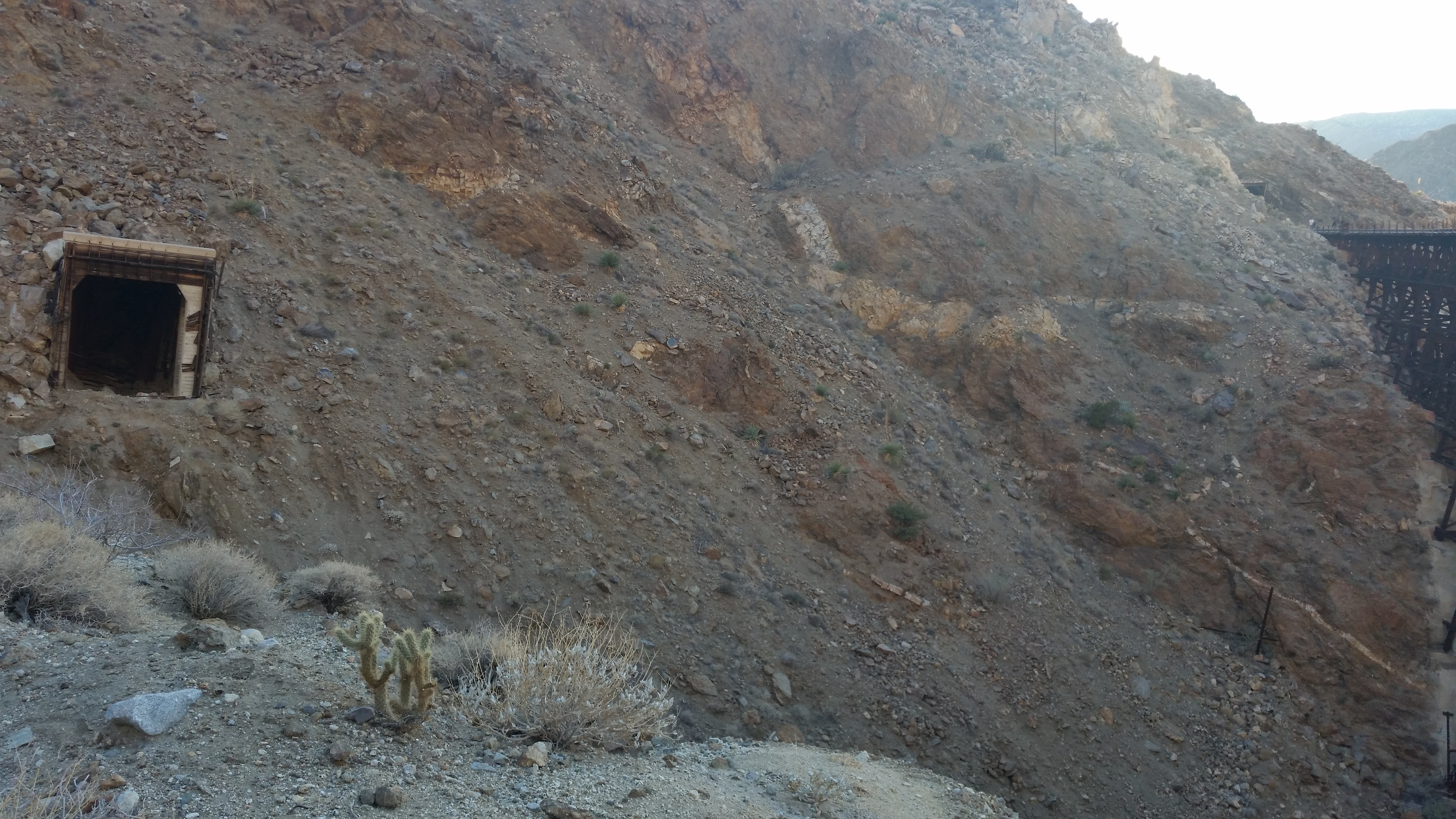
North portal of collapsed Tunnel 15

The San Diego and Arizona Railway experienced a series of difficulties, including collapsed tunnels and rock slides, which led to the periodic closure of the railroad. One such difficulty was the collapse of Tunnel 15 in March 1932; it had been caused by an earthquake. Its remnants can still be seen today.

== History ==
Designed by Chief Engineer of the San Diego and Arizona Railroad, Carl Eichenlaub, it was built to common standard drawing CS-33 standards. The trestle was built in response to the collapse of Tunnel 15. According to the original plans, the trestle would be 633-foot (193 m) long, and 186-foot (57 m) high. Construction began in 1932. Sections of the trestle were assembled at the bottom of the canyon, then lifted into position. Redwood timber, the same type used for railroad ties along the rest of the route, was utilized because Carrizo Gorge's considerable temperature fluctuations could have led to metal fatigue in a steel bridge. To resist Goat Canyon's high winds, it was built with a 14° curve. Additionally, the bridge was built without nails. Construction was completed by 1933, leading to a realignment of the railroad route. For fire suppression, a tank car was located near tunnel 16.

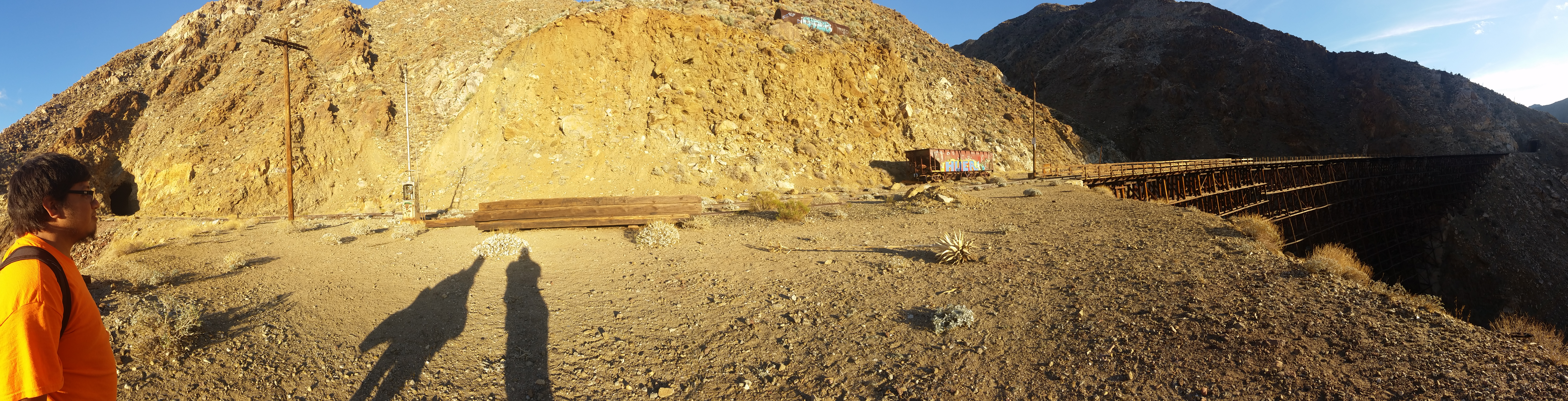
Panoramic photograph of the area just north of, and of, the Goat Canyon Trestle

After World War II, the San Diego and Arizona Eastern Railway was impacted by increased automobile travel spurred by state investment in a highway system which could operate at a loss. In 1951, scheduled passenger service over the trestle ended. Intermittent freight traffic continued when the railroad was not closed due to damage. In 1976, Hurricane Kathleen damaged the trestle, as well as the rest of the line; repairs were not completed until 1981. Use of the railroad ended again in 1983 due to collapsed tunnels. In 1999, Huell Howser visited the trestle and filmed an episode about it for the public television series California's Gold. Restoration of the railway did not resume until 2003. During the 2003 Cedar Fire, crews working on the railway repairs assisted the California Department of Forestry by extinguishing fires set by arsonists along the railroad tracks.

The Carrizo Gorge Railway resumed service on the line after repairs were completed in 2004. Pacific Southwest Railway Museum provided trips on the railroad from Campo. In 2008, the Desert line, which includes track north of Mexico including Carrizo Gorge closed indefinitely for repairs, ending revenue rail usage of the trestle. In early 2017, tunnel Number 6 near the trestle collapsed, and the route was obstructed. In January 2018, Baja California Railroad assessed the line hoping to repair it to allow it to return to operation, but efforts to repair the line had been abandoned by 2021. The trestle remains a popular destination for hikers.

== Surrounding environment ==
Goat Canyon is a valley in San Diego County, California. One feature of the canyon is a dry waterfall. The land that forms the canyon is crystalline basement. Since at least the 1970s, there has been a population of bighorn sheep, living near the trestle. Another endangered species in the area of the trestle is the Bell's vireo, a songbird. During a desert bloom, which occurred in 2017, monkey flowers were observed flowering in the canyon.

== Replicas ==
The San Diego Model Railroad Museum hosts a HO scale replica of the trestle. HO Scale is 1:87 scale. It stands six feet (1.8 m) off the floor is 10 feet (3.0 m) tall in total. It is older than the museum itself, having been built in 1941. The museum also contains a smaller N scale (1:160) replica of the trestle, based on an 1855 surveyed route.

== See also ==
- Kinsol Trestle
