= Tecate railway station =

Railway station in Tecate, Mexico

Tecate station Estación de Tecate

General information
- Location: 21460 Blvd. Defensores de Baja California 120, La Viñita, Tecate, Baja California; Mexico
- Coordinates: 32.569340°N 116.632321°W
- System: Baja California Railroad station
- Operator: Baja California Railroad (currently)
- Platforms: 2
- Tracks: 2

Other information
- Website: https://www.bajarr.com/en/stations/ (BJRR stations) https://tecate-railway-museum.edan.io/ (former railroad museum)

History
- Opened: 1914

Services
Preceding station	Baja California Railroad	Following station
García Terminus	Tijuana-Tecate Tourist Train	Terminus

Former services
Preceding station	Southern Pacific Railroad	Following station
Agua Caliente toward San Diego	San Diego and Arizona Eastern Railway Main Line	Campo toward El Centro
Location

Tecate station (Spanish: Estación de Tecate) was a train station in Tecate, Baja California. The Building has an influence on the architectural style of the first stage of American Frank Lloyd Wright. The station had a waiting room, cellar and office on the ground floor.

== History ==
The station was built around 1914 and was part of the Inter-California Railway, a branch of the Southern Pacific Railroad. It was built at a connection point between the Tijuana and Tecate Railway and the Inter-California Railway. This route was part of the Southern Pacific rail network that crossed Mexican territory at Tijuana passing through Tecate, leaving Mexico at a point near Campo, California; re-entering Mexican territory in Mexicali to leave Mexico at Algodones, in the northeastern part of the Baja California Peninsula. Right next to the station, in 1932, a malt plant for export was put into operation.
