= Goat Canyon (Carrizo Gorge) =

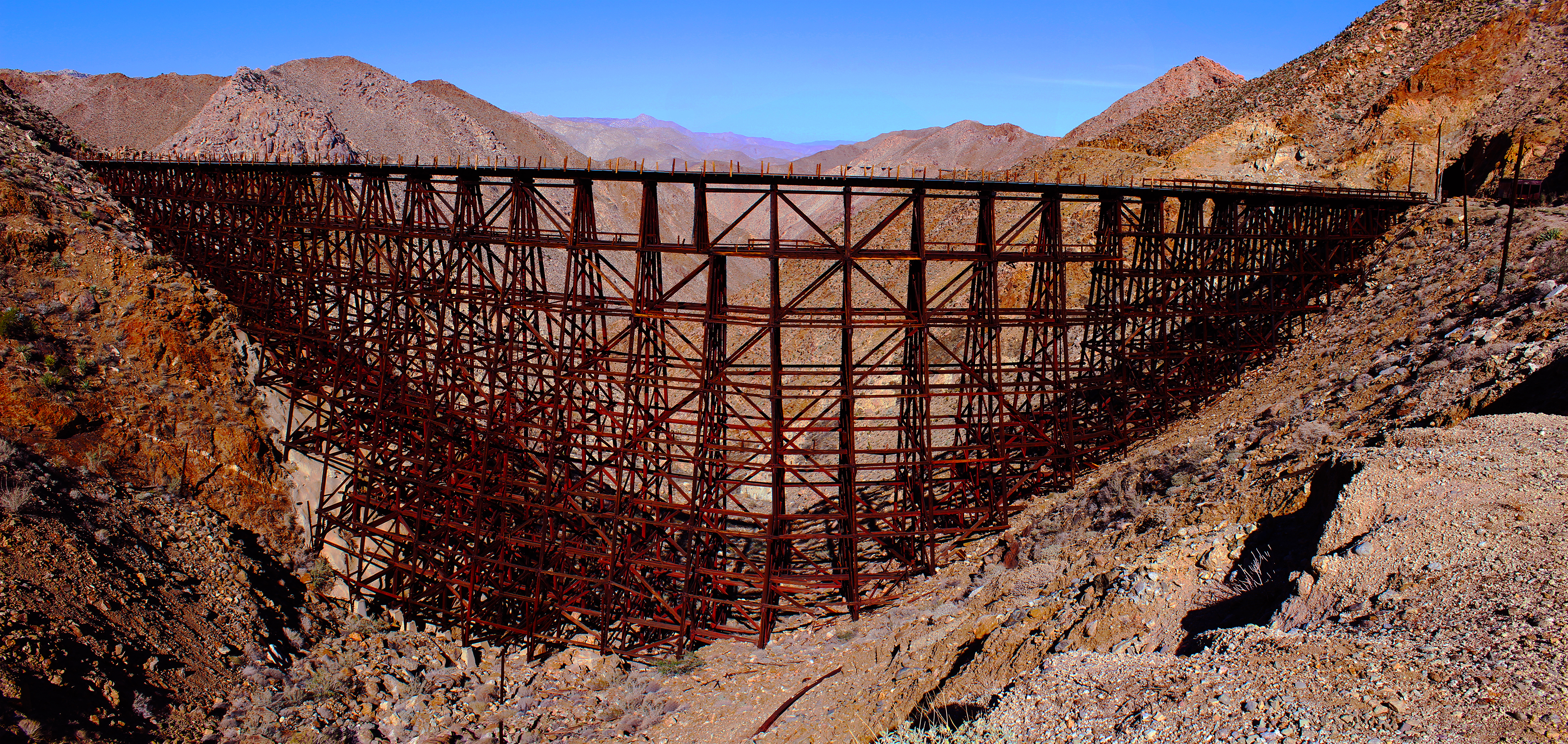
- The canyon with Goat Canyon Trestle
- Floor elevation: 1,690 ft (520 m)
- Area: Jacumba Mountains

Geography
- Location: Carrizo Gorge
- Coordinates: 32°43′57″N 116°11′23″W
- Interactive map of Goat Canyon

Goat Canyon is a valley in San Diego County, California, United States, located within the Carrizo Gorge in the Jacumba Mountains. The rock forming the canyon is crystalline basement. One feature of the canyon is a dry waterfall. The canyon is bridged by a wooden railroad trestle, the Goat Canyon Trestle, which is the world's largest curved all-wood trestle. The canyon is accessible by trail by traveling west from Mortero Palms.

== Flora and fauna ==
Goat Canyon is named after desert bighorn sheep that live within and around the canyon. During a desert bloom, which occurred in 2017, monkey flowers were observed flowering in the canyon. The endangered species least Bell's vireo migrates through the area around the canyon.

== Human history ==
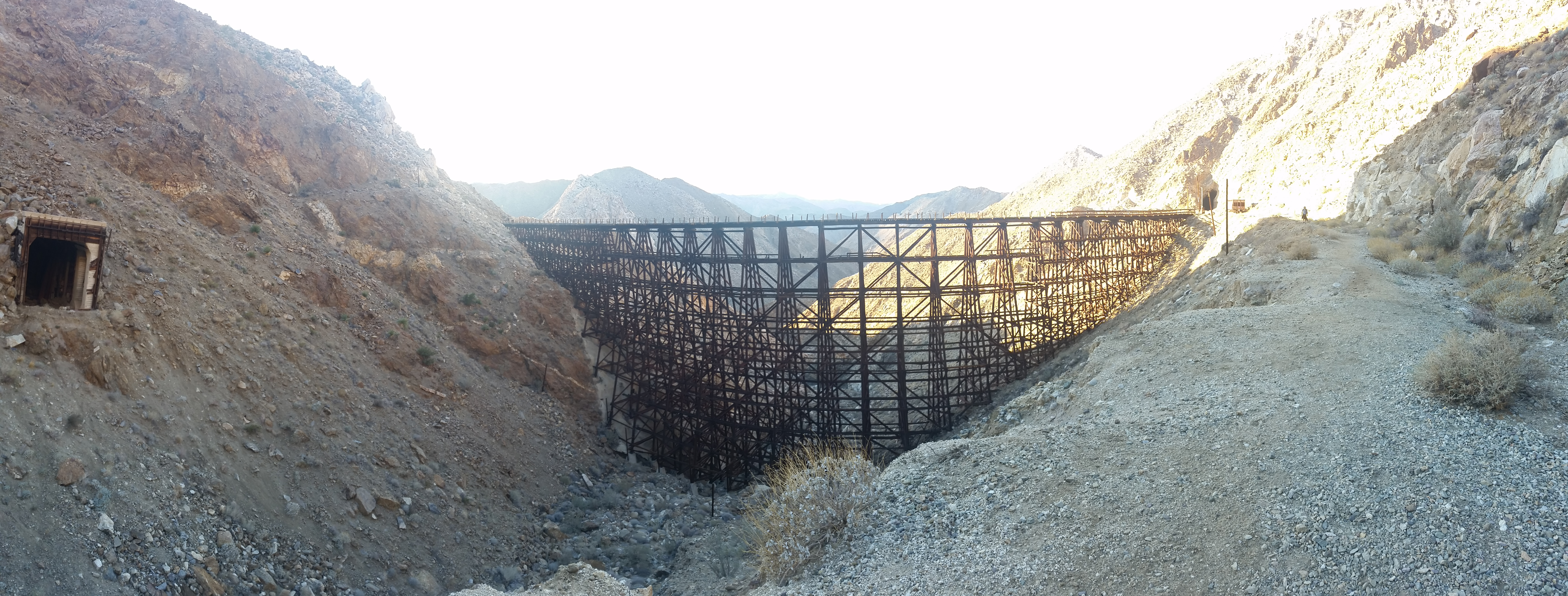
Panoramic photograph of Goat Canyon Trestle and Tunnel number 15

Prior to Spanish governance, there was Native American activity in the area around Goat Canyon; the impact of this activity includes petroglyphs and pictograms in Carrizo Gorge. The last Native Americans to live in the area were the Kumeyaay. Later cattle ranchers utilized the area. Beginning in 1912, construction began on the San Diego and Arizona Eastern Railway in the area. The Carrizo Gorge portion of the line, including Goat Canyon, was the final portion to be completed. A railroad tunnel of The San Diego and Arizona Railway, Tunnel number 15, was built into the side of the canyon but it collapsed in 1932. The collapse was caused by an earthquake, which dramatically changed the inclination of Tunnel number 15. After Tunnel number 15 collapsed, it was decided that it would be bypassed using a wooden trestle. During the construction of the trestle, segments were lowered into the canyon from the partially completed trestle. Construction workers took breaks in a portion of the collapsed tunnel that they called the "mud shed". The trestle was completed in 1933.

In 1976 Hurricane Kathleen's effects impacted the region around the canyon, destroying tracks and other trestles in Carrizo Gorge; the trestle over Goat Canyon was also damaged, with some of its footings destroyed during the hurricane. By 1981, repairs from the hurricane damage were completed. Heavy rains returned to the area in 1982 and 1983; this led to rail service being discontinued over Goat Canyon and through Carrizo Gorge. After repairs were again completed, trains once again ran over Goat Canyon in 2004. In 2008 the trains once again stopped running over Goat Canyon.

=== Popular media ===
In 1999, Huell Howser traveled to the canyon to visit the trestle over it. In 2017, the canyon was depicted in a "Mysteries of the Abandoned" episode on the Science Channel.

== Other uses ==
There is another Goat Canyon in San Diego County, which is located north of the Mexico–United States barrier and south of the Tijuana River.
