= Southern Pacific 2355 =

Preserved SP T-31 class 4-6-0 locomotive

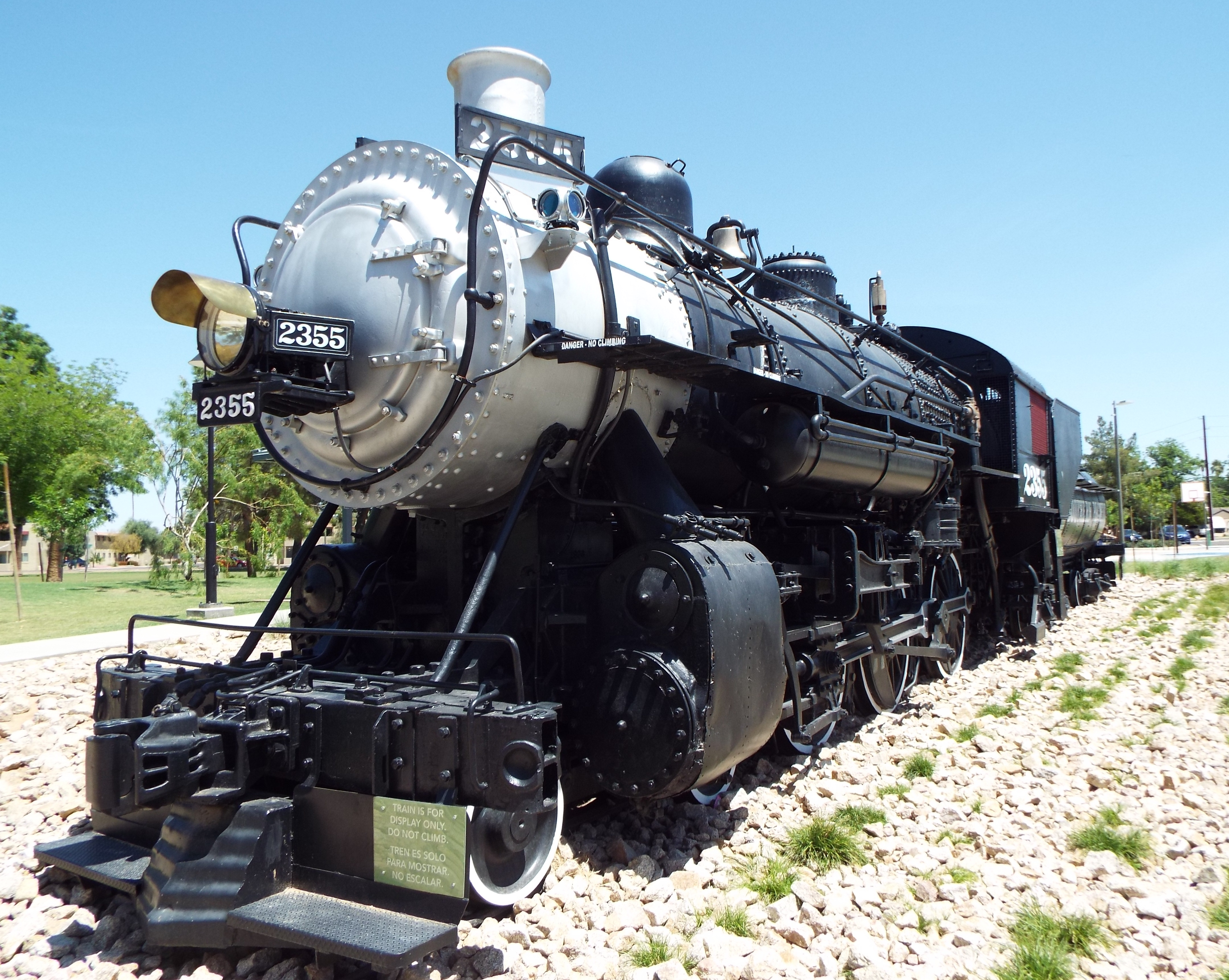
- Southern Pacific Railroad (SP) 2355
Type and origin
- Power type: Steam
- Builder: Baldwin Locomotive Works
- Serial number: 38223
- Build date: August 1912
Specifications
- Configuration
  - Whyte: 4-6-0
- Gauge: 4 ft 8 1/2 in (1,435 mm)
- Driver dia.: 63 in (1,600 mm)
- Adhesive weight: 162,000 lb (73,000 kg)
- Loco weight: 208,000 lb (94,350 kg)
- Fuel type: Oil
- Boiler pressure: 210 psi (1.4 MPa)
- Cylinders: Two, outside
- Cylinder size: 22 in × 28 in (560 mm × 710 mm)
- Valve gear: Walschaert
- Valve type: Piston valves
- Loco brake: Air
- Train brakes: Air
- Couplers: Knuckle
Performance figures
- Tractive effort: 38,400 lbf (170.81 kN)
Career
- Operators: Southern Pacific Railroad
- Class: T-31
- Number in class: 10
- Numbers: SP 2355
- Delivered: 1912
- Retired: 1957
- Current owner: City of Mesa, Arizona
- Disposition: On static display

Southern Pacific Railroad 2355 is one of 10 heavy 4-6-0 "Ten-wheeler" steam locomotives built by Baldwin Locomotive Works in 1912, designated the T-31 class. SP 2355 was retired from service in 1957 and was converted to a static display at Pioneer Park in Mesa, Arizona.

The locomotive was fenced off for safety concerns in the 1990s. Since 2008, efforts have been underway to relocate 2355 within Pioneer Park and perform cosmetic restoration. Restoring the locomotive to a running state from its current condition is deemed to be cost-prohibitive.

Southern Pacific 2355 has one surviving sibling. Southern Pacific 2353 is on static display in Campo, California's Pacific Southwest Railway Museum.

Southern Pacific 2355 remains on display where it was left in Pioneer Park. It was not relocated. The locomotive and tender have undergone a complete cosmetic restoration. Asbestos material and lead-based paint have been removed. Its paint was stripped completely using an environmentally-friendly blasting material. Polyurethane paint was applied and the train's electronics have been updated. Informational, interactive signage has been installed along with a completely new lighting arrangement. Cab control restorations continue. There are also plans to mount plaques listing all the donors and persons helping with the locomotive's restoration.
