= Southern Pacific 2353 =

Preserved SP T-31 class 4-6-0 locomotive

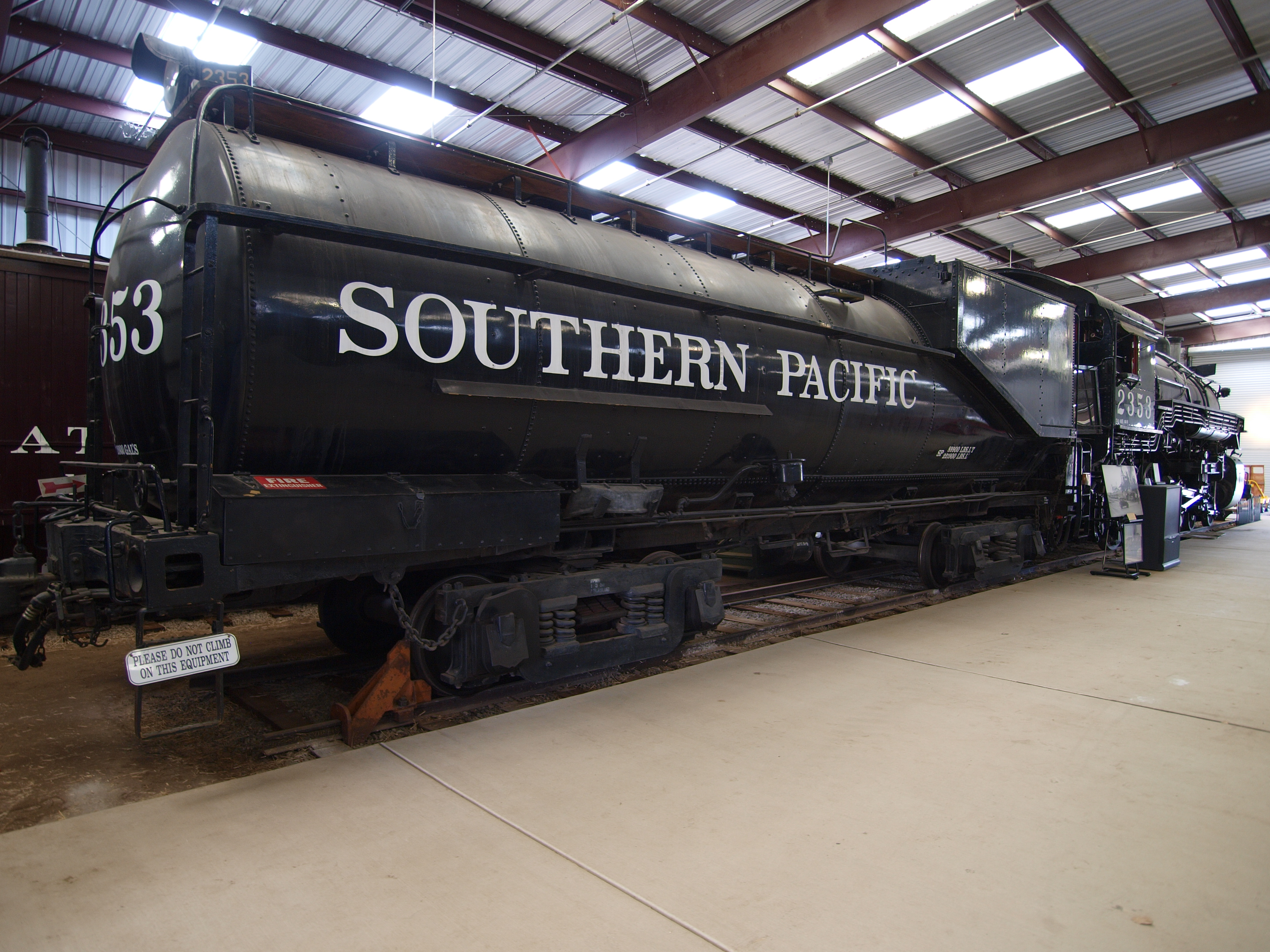
Type and origin
- Power type: Steam
- Builder: Baldwin Locomotive Works
- Serial number: 38221
- Build date: August 1912
Specifications
- Configuration
  - Whyte: 4-6-0
- Gauge: 4 ft 8 1/2 in (1,435 mm)
- Driver dia.: 63 in (1,600 mm)
- Adhesive weight: 162,000 lb (73,000 kg)
- Loco weight: 208,000 lb (94,350 kg)
- Tender weight: 89,900 lb (40,800 kg)
- Fuel type: Oil
- Boiler pressure: 210 psi (1.4 MPa)
- Cylinders: Two, outside
- Cylinder size: 22 in × 28 in (560 mm × 710 mm)
- Valve gear: Walschaerts
- Valve type: Piston valves
- Loco brake: Air
- Train brakes: Air
- Couplers: Knuckle
Performance figures
- Tractive effort: 38,400 lbf (170.81 kN)
Career
- Operators: Southern Pacific Railroad
- Class: T-31
- Number in class: 10
- Numbers: SP 2353
- Retired: January 1957 (revenue service); 2001 (excursion service)
- Restored: March 2, 1996
- Current owner: Pacific Southwest Railway Museum
- Disposition: On static display

Southern Pacific 2353 is one of 10 heavy 4-6-0 "Ten-wheeler" steam locomotives built by Baldwin Locomotive Works (BLW) in August 1912, designated the T-31 class. It was delivered to the Southern Pacific Railroad (SP) in October and the boiler was changed in 1917. In 1927, 2353 was leased to the San Diego & Arizona line, and later returned to Southern Pacific in 1939, serving in the San Francisco Bay Area. No. 2353 was retired from service on 18 January 1957 and displayed for the next 29 years at the California Mid-Winter Fairgrounds in Imperial, California.

In 1984, the Mid-Winter Fair's operator donated No. 2353 to the Pacific Southwest Railway Museum, with physical transfer of the locomotive occurring in summer 1986. Over the next ten years, volunteers restored 2353 to working order, with its first public appearance under steam happening on March 2, 1996. 2353 was withdrawn from service again in 2001, with extensive boiler repairs required before it can run again. Since then 2353 has been on static display. 2353 then went back on the rails one more time on November 16, 2019, during the San Diego and Arizona Railway's 100th Anniversary, held at the museum.

Southern Pacific 2353 has at least one surviving sibling. Southern Pacific 2355 has been on static display in Mesa, Arizona's Pioneer Park since 1958. Efforts to cosmetically restore 2355 have been underway since at least 2008.

== Film history ==
The 2353 was used for a brief action scene in the 2001 movie Pearl Harbor. The filming occurred on its last day of operation. The locomotive was also seen when the Irish girl group B*Witched filmed the music video of their hit single "Jesse Hold On" in 1999. And it can also be seen passing Barbara Stanwyck at the beginning of the film Clash By Night (1953). 2353 was also featured in a Levi's commercial.
