= San Diego and Imperial Valley Railroad =

Class III railroad in San Diego County, California, US

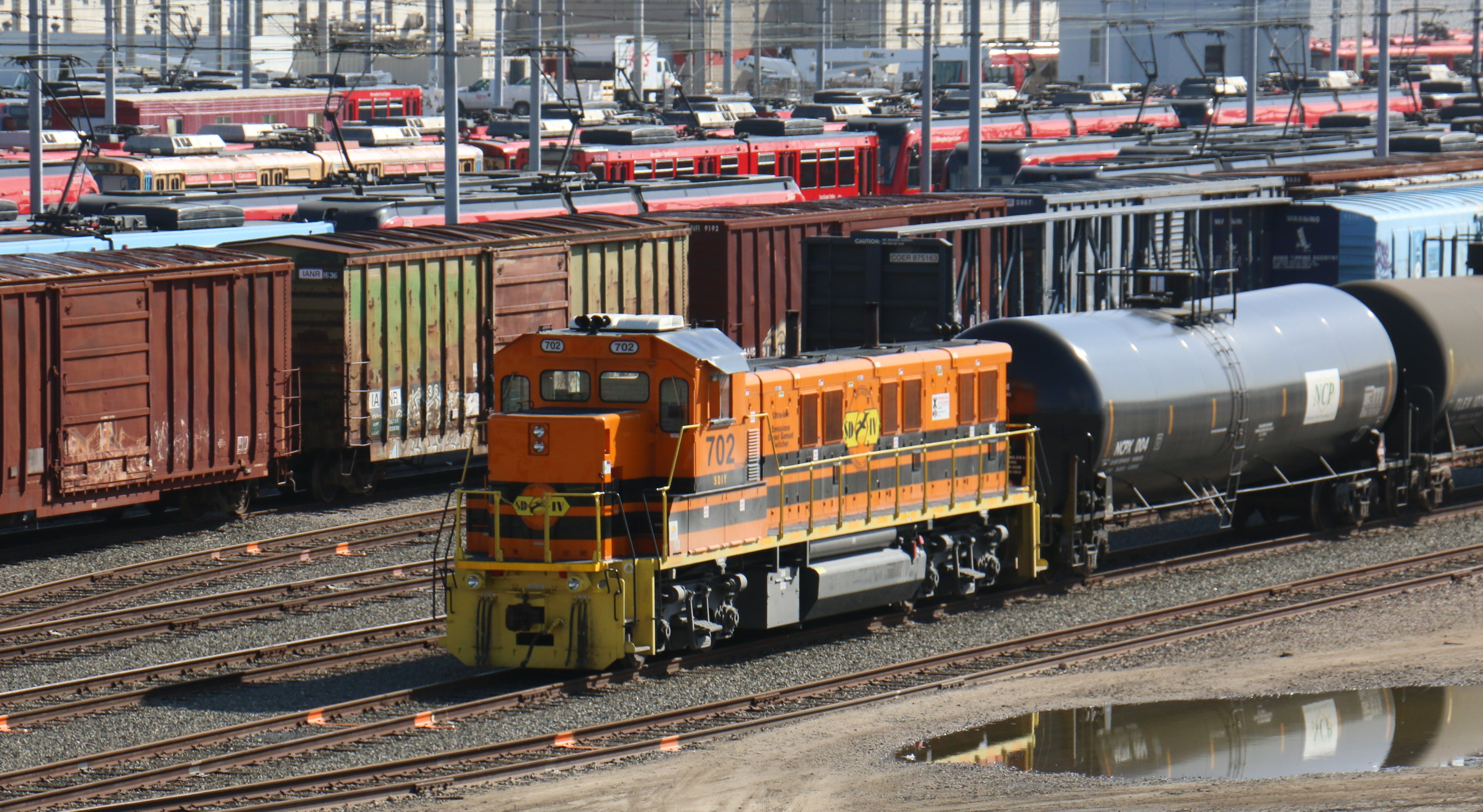
- SDIY 702, a locomotive for the San Diego and Imperial Valley Railroad at the railroad's yard in Downtown San Diego.

Overview
- Fleet: Two NRE 3GS21B diesel-powered genset locomotives
- Parent company: Genesee & Wyoming
- Reporting mark: SDIY
- Locale: San Diego
- Dates of operation: 1984–present

Technical
- Track gauge: 4 ft 8 1/2 in (1,435 mm) standard gauge
- Length: 38.8 miles (62.4 km) (7.2 miles (11.6 km) currently unused)
- No. of tracks: 1–2

Other
- Website: San Diego & Imperial Valley Railroad

The San Diego and Imperial Valley Railroad (SD&IV) (reporting mark SDIY) is a class III railroad operating freight rail service in the San Diego area, providing service to customers in the region and moving railcars between the end of BNSF Railway in downtown San Diego and the Mexico–United States border in San Ysidro. It was established in October 1984 and is owned and operated by Genesee & Wyoming.

The railroad has exclusive trackage rights to operate over tracks of the San Diego and Arizona Eastern Railway, a subsidiary of the San Diego Metropolitan Transit System, the regional public transit service provider. Tracks are shared with the San Diego Trolley, another subsidiary of the Metropolitan Transit System, and freight trains are only operated at night when passenger service is not in operation.

== History ==
The San Diego & Imperial Valley Railroad was established after March 8, 1984, when RailTex signed an agreement with Metropolitan Transit Development Board (known as the Metropolitan Transit System after 2005) to operate freight service across its San Diego and Arizona Eastern Railway.

The Metropolitan Transit Development Board (MTDB) had purchased the railroad from the financially struggling Southern Pacific Railroad in August 1979 with plans to convert the Main Line between San Diego and San Ysidro for use by light rail passenger trains and to preserve rail freight services between the Port of San Diego and the Imperial Valley. The MTDB initially signed an agreement with Kyle Railways to operate the line, but a storm in January 1980 damaged the Desert Line (between the Mexico–United States border in Tecate and Plaster City) and the portion of the line between Tijuana and Tecate (owned by another company) which wasn't repaired until January 1983. Just six months after the line reopened, a fire on June 18, 1983, destroyed two bridges on the Desert Line. After the fire, Kyle Railways petitioned the Interstate Commerce Commission (ICC) to abandon the railway, a request that was denied on April 25, 1984.

RailTex's application to operate freight service along the San Diego and Arizona Eastern Railway was approved by the ICC on August 9, 1984, and the San Diego & Imperial Valley Railroad began operation on October 15, 1984. The new general manager of the SD&IV, Dick Engle, persuaded local carriers to ship on this line and invited Mexican customers to start receiving shipments. The effort was met with much skepticism and took place more than 10 years before the signing of the North American Free Trade Agreement, that would increase cross-border shipping. On August 1, 1986, the SD&IV entered into a multi-year agreement with the Mexican Government to provide freight service into Baja California.

The work to repair the Desert Line proved challenging. In July 1989, SD&IV began to repair the burned trestles and collapsed tunnels on the line, but the estimated cost for the work was overwhelming for the railroad and work was halted in the early 1990s. In the early 2000s, investors calling themselves Carrizo Gorge Railway made an offer to make the needed repairs to the Desert Line and pay fees to the SD&IV and the MTDB in exchange for trackage rights. The deal was approved by all parties in April 2003 and repairs on the line began.

In 2000, the Coronado Branch from the 12th Street Junction in National City to Imperial Beach, CA saw its last shipment. Since then, the line has seen no traffic, and the connection to the Main Line has been removed.

The Desert Line reopened to freight service in January 2005. By October 2008 the condition of the track had deteriorated to the point that the Carrizo Gorge Railway closed the Desert Line. The Metropolitan Transit System (former MTDB) terminated the deal with Carrizo Gorge Railway in December 2012 and awarded new, long term operating agreement for the Desert Line to the Pacific Imperial Railroad. Earlier that year, on January 1, 2012, the Baja California Railroad assumed control of the line between Tijuana and Tecate which connected SD&IV's Main Line in San Diego with the Desert Line. The Pacific Imperial Railroad spent years negotiating a deal with the Baja California Railroad to transport freight over its tracks, which it said delayed its repairs to the Desert Line. The Pacific Imperial Railroad declared bankruptcy in October 2016. The Baja California Railroad purchased the rights to use the Desert Line in March 2017 with an agreement to pay the Metropolitan Transit System a million dollars per year to retain its lease. As of February 2019 Baja California Railroad has made no repairs to the line.

== Current operations ==
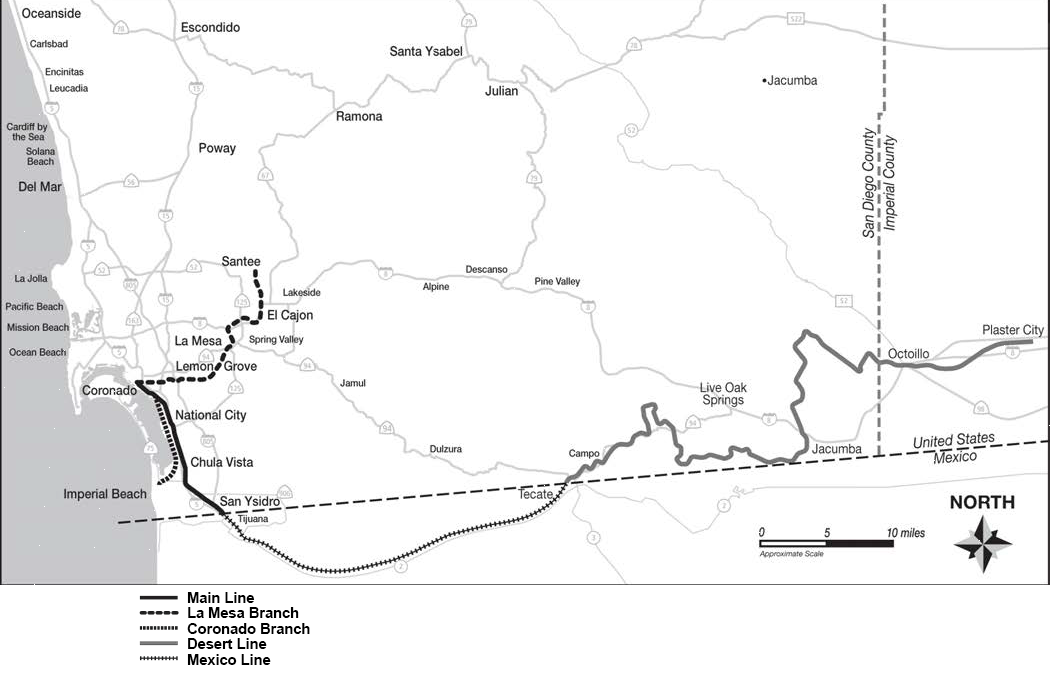
Railway map of the San Diego and Imperial Valley Railroad (SDIY), 2011.

The San Diego & Imperial Valley Railroad holds the exclusive right to operate freight service over three lines owned by the San Diego and Arizona Eastern Railway:

- The Main Line which runs 15.5 miles from downtown San Diego south to San Ysidro, and is also used by the Blue Line of the San Diego Trolley.
- The La Mesa Branch which runs 16.1 miles east to the city of El Cajon, and is also used by the Orange Line of the San Diego Trolley.
- The currently unused Coronado Branch which splits from the Main Line in National City and runs 7.2 miles south to Imperial Beach.

The San Diego & Imperial Valley Railroad does not hold the rights to operate over the San Diego and Arizona Eastern Railway's Desert Line in the Imperial Valley.

Despite operating on the electrified right-of-way of the San Diego Trolley, the San Diego and Imperial Valley Railroad uses two NRE 3GS21B diesel-powered genset locomotives instead of electric locomotives, as the rail yards used to marshal the trains are not electrified. However, genset locomotives are more fuel-efficient and have lower emissions than most traditional diesel locomotives as they are powered by three smaller engines that are turned off and on as needed. The overhead electric wires also prevent the double-stacking of shipping containers on rail cars on the line.

Freight trains only operate between 2 am and 4 am when San Diego Trolley passenger trains are not in operation.

The railroad interchanges with the BNSF Railway in San Diego and the Baja California Railroad in San Ysidro and the railroad's main source of traffic is moving railcars between the two other railroads. The primary commodities hauled are petroleum products, agricultural products, and wood pulp. The SD&IY hauled around 6,500 carloads in 2008.

== See also ==
- San Diego & Arizona Eastern Railway
- San Diego Trolley
- BNSF Railway
- Baja California Railroad
- Pacific Imperial Railroad
- RailAmerica
- Carrizo Gorge Railway
