= Goat Canyon =

Goat Canyon may refer to:

- Goat Canyon (Carrizo Gorge), a part of Carrizo Gorge in Eastern San Diego County, California, United States
- Goat Canyon (Tijuana River Valley), a valley in Western San Diego County which crosses south into Baja California, Mexico where it is known as Cañón de los Laureles
