= Pacific Imperial Railroad =

American railway line

Pacific Imperial Railroad, Inc.

Overview
- Headquarters: 401 West A Street Suite 1150 San Diego, CA 92101 United States
- Reporting mark: PIR
- Locale: Southern Border Region, Southern California
- Dates of operation: 2011–2016
- Predecessor: Carrizo Gorge Railway
- Successor: Baja California Railroad US subsidiary

Technical
- Track gauge: 4 ft 8 1/2 in (1,435 mm) standard gauge

The Pacific Imperial Railroad (reporting mark PIR) was a company in possession of the SD&AE Desert Line right of way in Southern California, colloquially referred to as the Desert Line. The Desert Line starts at the border crossing at Division, near Campo at Milepost 59.94 (inside Tunnel #4) in eastern San Diego County, California, where it connects with the Baja California Railroad in Mexico, and stretches 70.1 miles through the Jacumba Mountains to El Centro, California, where it connects to Union Pacific Railroad at Milepost 129.61. The significance of the Desert Line is that it provides an alternative rail route to and from the east for servicing the distribution, transportation, and supply chain needs of the Cali-Baja region.

== History ==
In 2012, following the embargo of the Carrizo Gorge Railway (CZRY) in October 2008 and the loss of operating rights in the Mexican Tecate-Tijuana segment, Pacific Imperial Railroad, Inc. replaced the San Diego and Imperial Valley Railroad as the rail operator between Plaster City and the border near Campo. The last freight movements through the area were sand from Mexico, for use in making ready-mixed concrete for the construction markets in San Diego County, CA.

Pacific Imperial Railroad, Inc. (PIR), was incorporated in Delaware on October 27, 2011 and qualified to do business in California on April 23, 2012, having its stated objectives being to lease, rehabilitate, reopen and resume service, manage, operate, and maintain the entire Desert Line from "Mileposts 59.94" at or near the U.S. Border in "Division" to "Milepost 130.0" at Plaster City, west of El Centro. On December 20, 2012, PIR executed a 99-year lease with San Diego and Arizona Eastern Railway (SD&AE) and San Diego Metropolitan Transit System (MTS), owners of the Desert Line right of way. The Desert Line extends from east San Diego County (border with Baja California) to western Imperial County.

According to an article in the San Diego Union-Tribune, in early 2014, a management team hired by the company left, alleging that investor money was fraudulently diverted to company principals. Company officials denied that was the case, and MTS said it found no evidence of any fraud.

On or around October 17, 2014, Mexico's Baja California Railroad (BJRR) ended negotiations with PIR with concerns over the U.S. company's rights to haul freight through Mexico across the former Tijuana and Tecate Railroad. An article from the San Diego Reader implied that goods from San Diego may have to be trucked through Mexico and then loaded onto trains in the United States before continuing to El Centro to interchange with the Union Pacific Railroad. However, there was an apparent turning point in the negotiations between BJRR and PIR sometime during the first half of 2015. On June 22, 2015 at the MTS headquarters in downtown San Diego, Baja California Railroad and Pacific Imperial Railroad reached a significant step by executing a memorandum of understanding expressly acknowledging the parties' desire and intent to work together to develop a binational railroad and outlining the expectations and issues that need to be resolved. The MOU states that the parties will use their best efforts to reach a "definitive agreement" on these outstanding issues within six months. Additionally, acknowledging that the delays in reaching an agreement with BJRR have also delayed the construction work necessary to bring the Desert Line back to an operational condition making it highly unlikely that PIR would be able to run a test train by the December 2015 lease deadline, PIR's management proposed that MTS agree to modify certain performance milestones so as to not be in violation of the lease. Subsequently, on July 17, 2015 PIR announced on the company's website that the new milestones were approved by the MTS Board of Directors by a 17-0 vote.

New owners took majority control of PIR in 2015. In June 2016, PIR and BJRR reached an agreement to pay the rehabilitation and operations of the Desert Line. BJRR subleased the Desert Line from Campo to Coyote Well; PIR will operate between Coyote Wells and Plaster City. Work by BJRR on restoring the Desert Line was scheduled to begin in the summer of 2016.

In October 2015 Arturo Alemany Salazar was confirmed as a CEO and president of PIR.Pacific Imperial Railroad Announces Majority Ownership Transfer and the Appointment of CEO and President Arturo Alemany

In October 2016, PIR announced it filed a voluntary petition for reorganization under Chapter 11 Bankruptcy in order to facilitate the further development of its primary asset.

According to Arturo Alemany, the recently appointed Chief Executive Officer of PIR, "the Chapter 11 petition will enable PIR to complete its goal by securing a strategic partner with the necessary capital and expertise to develop the remainder of PIR's railway assets in a manner that will pay PIR's creditors and further the interests of the public at large." Various claims arising from before Mr. Alemany's involvement with PIR had a chilling effect on PIR's ability to raise capital. The Chapter 11 proceeding will enable PIR to maximize the value of its assets, while providing an effective forum for resolving any disputes regarding the claims.

On March 10, 2017, a U.S. Bankruptcy Court judge approved the sale of PIR's Desert Line track leases and development rights to a Nevada corporation affiliated with Baja California Railroad. The bankruptcy case is still open, pending a final accounting of payments to creditors and two investor lawsuits.

== Operations ==
In June 2013 PIR entered into an agreement with J.L. Patterson & Associates, Inc. to commence inspections of the bridges, tunnels, track, and rail. A "summary level" report of the general condition of the bridges was completed in October 2013. So far, J.L. Patterson has completed initial repairs by clearing sand from the line that blew into the line's right-of-way with a ballast regulator and ran a high-tech Holland Track Geometry Hi-Rail truck on the Desert Line to identify defects on the entire Desert line.

As of July 1, 2015 PIR has made 5 payments of $500,000 totaling $2.5 million to MTS, owners of SD&AE's Desert Line right of way as part of the lease.

Thursday, June 9, 2016 - Binational Agreement Reached to Reconstruct the Desert Line Railroad "We have worked very hard with our partners in Mexico to realize this dream," said Arturo Alemany, Executive Board Member for Pacific Imperial Railroad. "This is a joint effort that will create a new cost-effective option for international businesses to ship products, such as automobiles, from Mexico to the eastern United States."

== Projects ==
PIR officials target the maquiladora market by interchanging with the Baja California Railroad where it meets the west end of the Desert Line, at the Mexico-US border at Division/Lindero (between Tecate and Campo), and with Union Pacific Railroad in Plaster City, CA. The PIR has also expressed intent to finance the proposed "El Lindero" customs, intermodal interchange, and industrial park project, which would be located one kilometer south of the border at Division/Lindero.

Improvements to the "Desert Line" started in August 2013. In August 2015, 49 empty boxcars were removed from the dormant line by GATX in preparation for reconstruction efforts.
