= Carrizo Gorge Railway =

American railroad operator

Overview
- Headquarters: El Cajon, California
- Reporting mark: CZRY
- Locale: Southern California, Northern Baja California
- Dates of operation: 1997–2012
- Predecessor: Ferrocarriles Nacionales de México; San Diego and Imperial Valley Railroad
- Successor: Baja California Railroad (in Mexico); Pacific Imperial Railroad (on the Desert Line)

Technical
- Track gauge: 4 ft 8 1/2 in (1,435 mm) standard gauge

Other
- Website: http://www.cgrp.us/czry.html

Carrizo Gorge Railway, Inc. (reporting mark CZRY) was a railroad operator on the San Diego and Arizona Eastern Railway (SD&AE) from Tijuana, Mexico, to Plaster City, California (Tijuana Tecate Short Line and Desert Line).

== History ==
In March 1984, the Metropolitan Transit Development Board signed an agreement with the shortline holding company Railtex to resume freight service on the SD&AE line from San Diego; Kyle Railways discontinued freight operations in 1983. The new railroad, the San Diego and Imperial Valley Railroad (SDIY), which commenced operations on October 15, 1984, did not want to invest the $5.5 million necessary to repair the collapsed tunnels and bridges in the Carrizo Gorge. CZRY Shareholders Gary Sweetwood and Benny L. Wright of local construction company East County Dirt Works, however, believed that the investment would be worthwhile and negotiated trackage rights on the line. The agreement required a fee of 6.9% imposed by SDIY, for the gross revenues from any freight on the SD&AE's Desert Line and a fee of 2% by the SD&AE Railway Company.

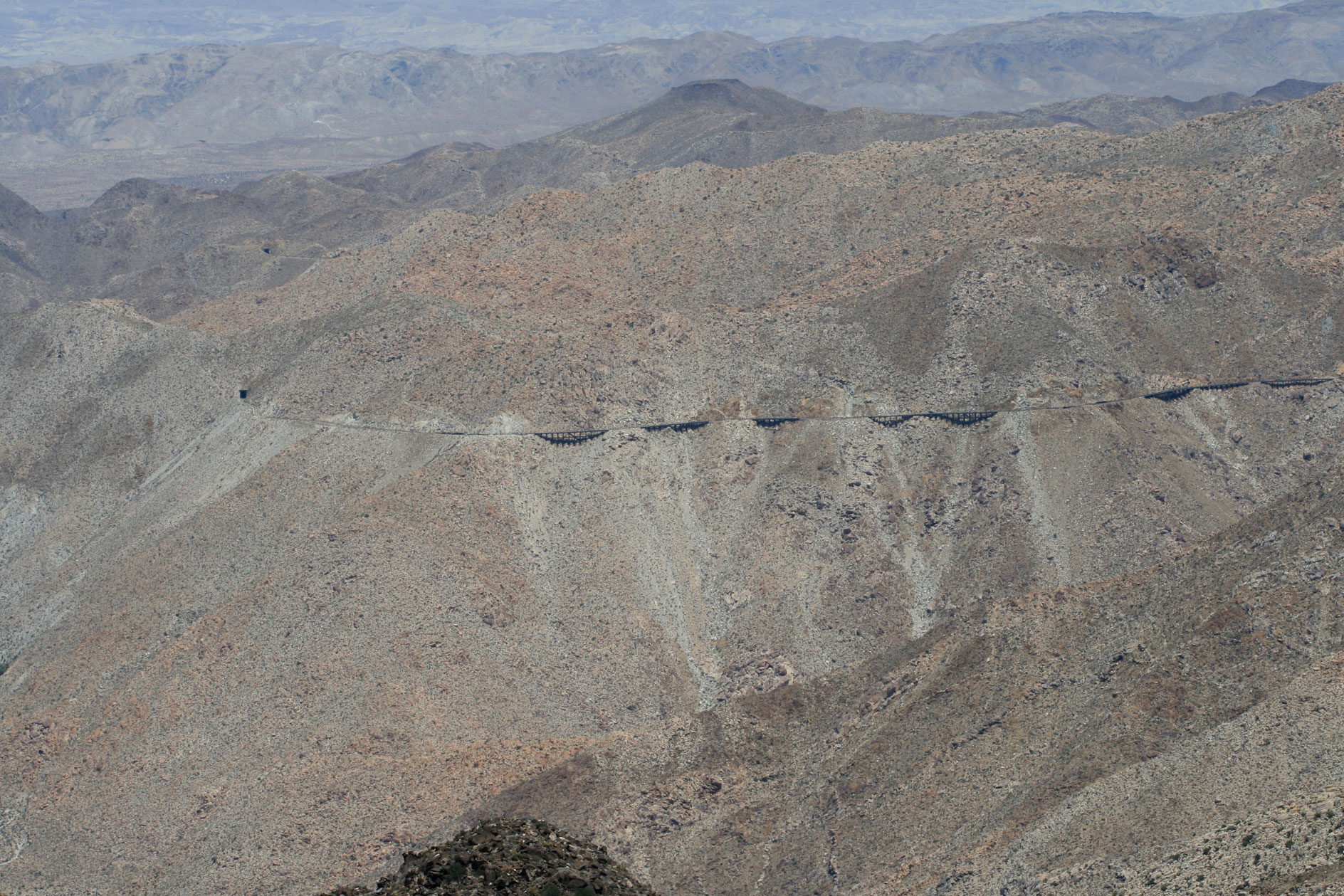
San Diego and Arizona Eastern Railway trestle in Carrizo Gorge

In 2000, FNM, owner of the Tijuana-Tecate segment, was privatized, transferring the administration to the State of Baja California.

On July 1, 2000, CZRY won the bid by the Administrator of the Tijuana-Tecate short line to operate as a technical-operational entity for rail service of the federally owned 44 miles from border to border, after SDIY exited operations of the segment. The CZRY later reopened the Desert Line in April 2004.

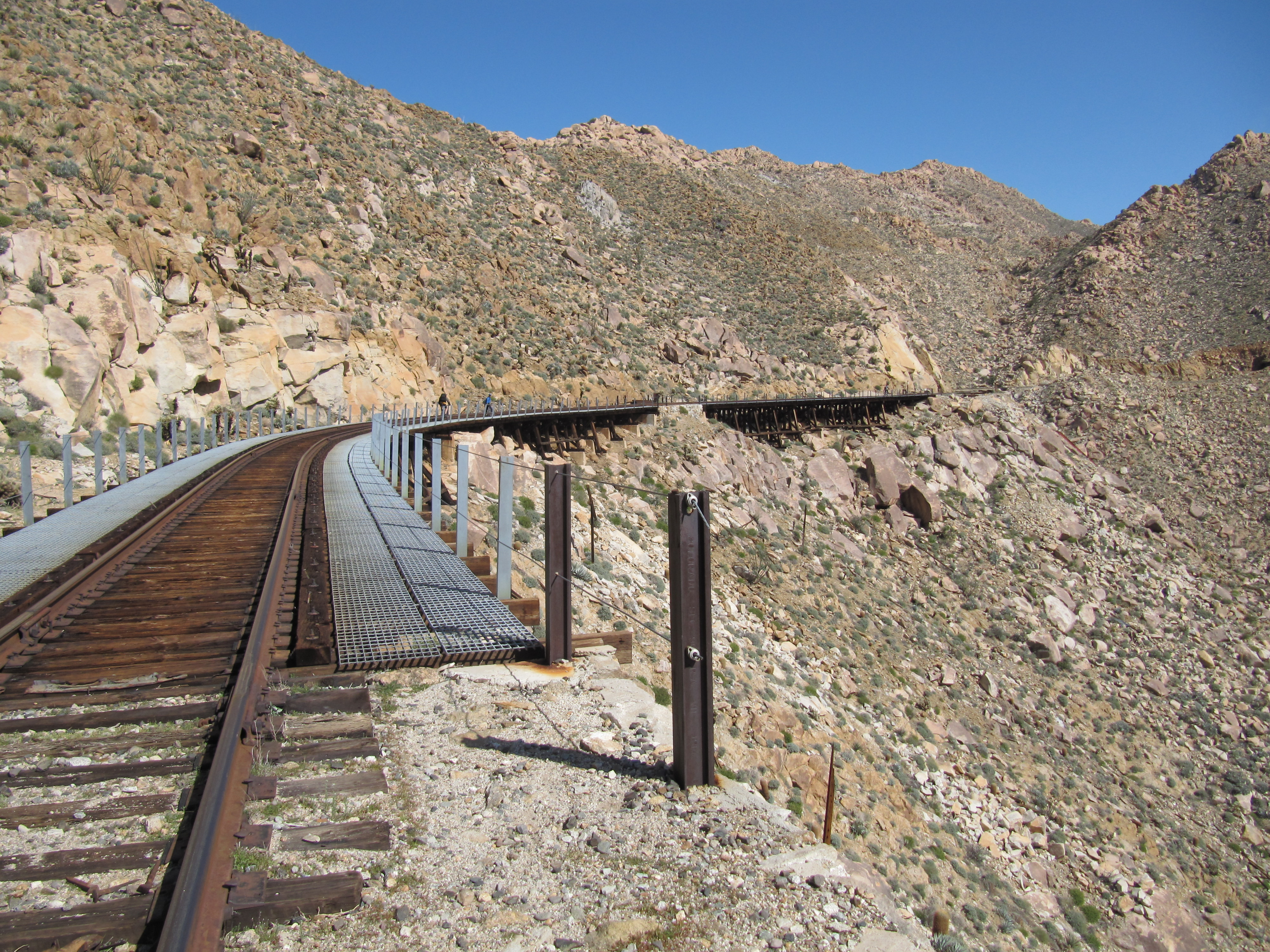
Carrizo Gorge Trestles

Sand hauling was the primary business for the CZRY from 1999 to 2005. The sand was used in making ready-mixed concrete for the construction markets in San Diego County, as it was loaded from Lindero to Campo and later from the Imperial Valley desert near Silica to Campo until 2007. There was also minor traffic of other goods between the U.S. and Mexico, mainly lumber for import. Rail car storage is another source of revenue on the east end of the Desert Line.

In October 2008, facing deteriorating conditions in the Desert Line and preparation for transportation projects in Baja California, the railroad embargoed the line from Plaster City to Campo for all revenue freight.

CZRY discontinued operations of the Tijuana-Tecate segment in the end of 2011. The contract was renewed in favor of Baja California Railroad, Inc. by the government of Baja California.

In December 2012, SD&AE, owner of the line, entered into a 50-year operating lease with the Pacific Imperial Railroad company for freight trains. The lease requires that certain operating goals and repairs be completed in a specific time frame. The lease also calls for a $1,000,000 yearly payment for the rights to operate freight trains, or 15% gross revenues, or any qualified value. With this lease, the operating rights of CZRY ended.

== Motive power ==
Carrizo Gorge Railway never owned any locomotives, but leased from various places. The railroad leased several locomotives from its employees and stockholder's interests from East County Dirt Works (ECDW).

- Two EMD F7As 100 & 102, ex-WCRC, née B&LE.
- One EMD F7B 101, ex-WCRC, née B&LE.
- One EMD GP9 3878, ex-DLSX, née SP.
- One EMD GP9 4324, ex-C&NW.
- One GP40M-2 669, ex-UP.
- One Alco S-4 1465, ex-RELCO, née SP.

After the Desert line was reopened, CZRY leased Union Pacific power, such as GP38-2's and GP60's. Union Pacific went to court to collect for non-payment of the lease and a return of the locomotives. They were later returned to Union Pacific after the enactment of the embargo.

== See also ==
- San Diego and Arizona Eastern Railway
- San Diego and Imperial Valley Railroad
- Pacific Imperial Railroad, Inc.
- Pacific Southwest Railway Museum
- San Diego & Arizona Railway
- United States Gypsum
- List of Mexican railroads
- Baja California Railroad
