= Pacific Southwest Railway Museum =

Museum in Campo, California, United States

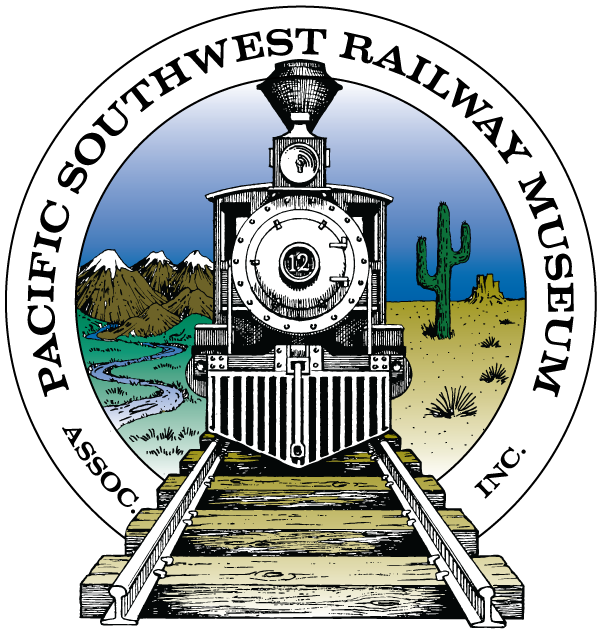
- Founded: 18 October 1959
- Founder: Eric Sanders, et al.
- Type: Public-benefit corporation
- Tax ID no.: 95-2374478 (CA 501(c)(3))
- Purpose: Preserving the physical legacy and the experience of rail transportation. Programs address the historical, social, economic and technical impact of railroading with particular emphasis on railroads of San Diego County and the larger systems with which they connected in the United States and Mexico.
- Location(s): 750 Depot Street; Campo, CA (excursion station); 4695 Nebo Drive; La Mesa, CA 91941 (business office)
- Coordinates: 32°36′46″N 116°28′21″W
- Origins: San Diego County Rail Museum
- Region served: San Diego County
- President: Stephen Hager
- Website: www.psrm.org
- Formerly called: San Diego Railroad Museum

The Pacific Southwest Railway Museum is a railroad museum in Campo, California, on the San Diego and Arizona Eastern Railway line. The museum also owns and manages a railroad depot in La Mesa, California.

== Facilities ==
=== Campo ===
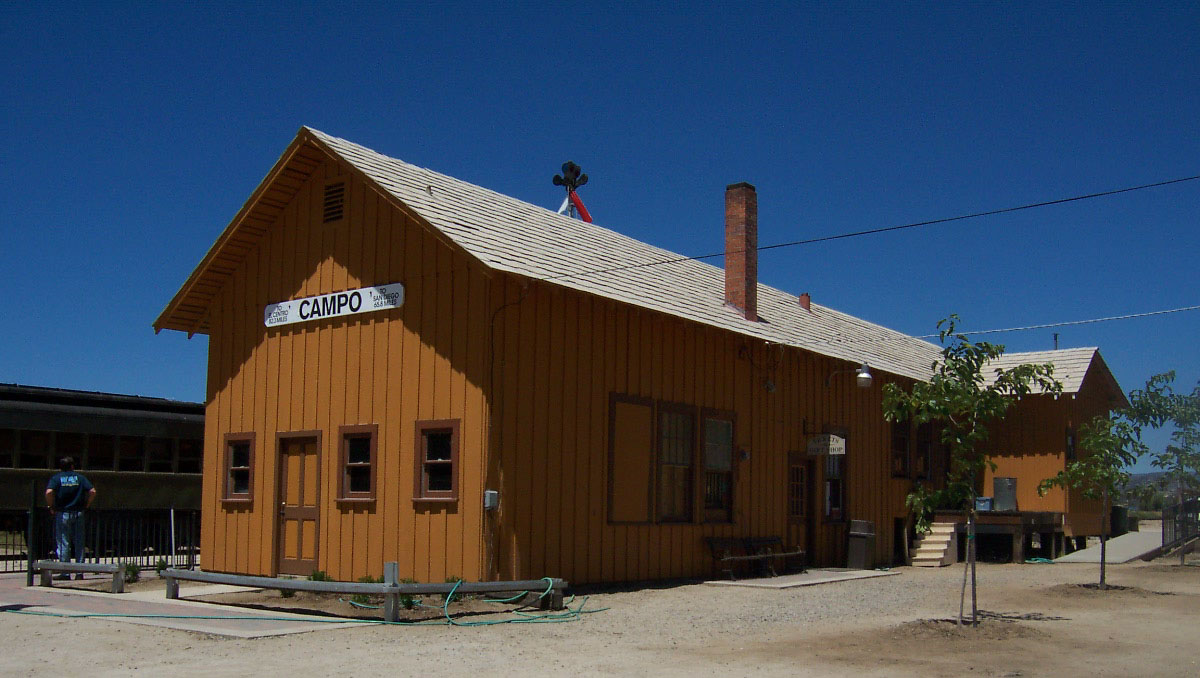
Campo station

Since 1986, the Pacific Southwest Railway Museum operates all-volunteer train excursions from the restored 1916 Depot in Campo, in the Mountain Empire area of southeastern San Diego County, California. These trains are powered by vintage diesel-electric locomotives. The facility sits on a 140 acres (0.57 km^{2}) property.

The museum also has approximately 90 historic railroad cars and locomotives on display, including five steam locomotives, eighteen diesel locomotives and many other pieces of rolling stock. A large display building houses part of the railroad equipment collection which allows visitors to view or walk through the equipment. This includes an exhibit titled "Signal Science" which uses retired railroad signals to demonstrate how railway signals work. The museum is also home to the Southwest Railway Library, which opened in Campo in July 2014. The library contains the second largest collection of railroad history in California.

Former services
Preceding station	Southern Pacific Railroad	Following station
Tecate toward San Diego	San Diego and Arizona Eastern Railway Main Line	Jacumba toward El Centro

=== La Mesa ===
The museum manages the original La Mesa depot in downtown La Mesa, next to La Mesa Boulevard station on the Orange Line of the San Diego Trolley. It is the oldest building in town and is the sole surviving San Diego and Cuyamaca Railway station. The museum's renovation of the depot won an award from San Diego's historic preservation society, Save Our Heritage Organization.

Next to the depot is a display train consisting of saddletank steam locomotive 0-6-0ST Mojave Northern Railroad #3, a Pacific Fruit Express reefer car, and a Southern Pacific Railroad caboose.

=== Train Rides ===
The museum has offered train rides since 1986 towards Miller Creek and 1987 to Tecate. However, in 2005, the museum announced that effective 2007, train rides to Miller Creek would be suspended indefinitely due to unsafe track conditions that the museum lacked the funds to rectify. From then until 2009, the Tecate trips were the only ones offered, until those too were suspended indefinitely when Tunnel Number 3 collapsed after hours. Nature has since reclaimed parts of the railway from Campo to Plaster City via Miller Creek, making this one of the few railroad museums or tourist railroads to be currently disconnected from the National Rail Network.

== In popular culture ==
- Part of the There Goes a... movie "There Goes a Train" features the railroad museum in Campo. The video was made in 1994 and the museum was closed for the week of shooting. In the video, the museum's ALCO MRS-1 United States Air Force 2104 locomotive was pulling a 3-car Golden State excursion train heading east. The museum was also a filming site for the Real Rockin' Wheels video, "Train Songs" featuring the museum's San Diego and Arizona EMD MRS-1 1809 locomotive.
- Irish girl group B*Witched filmed the music video of their hit single "Jesse Hold On" in the station in 1999, featuring one of the museum's locomotives, Southern Pacific 2353.

== See also ==
- Carrizo Gorge Railway
- List of heritage railroads in the United States
- List of railway museums
- List of museums in California
- Non-profit organization
- Pacific Imperial Railroad
- San Diego and Arizona Eastern Railway
- San Diego and Arizona Railway
