= San Diego and Arizona Eastern Railway =

Short-line American railroad founded in 1906

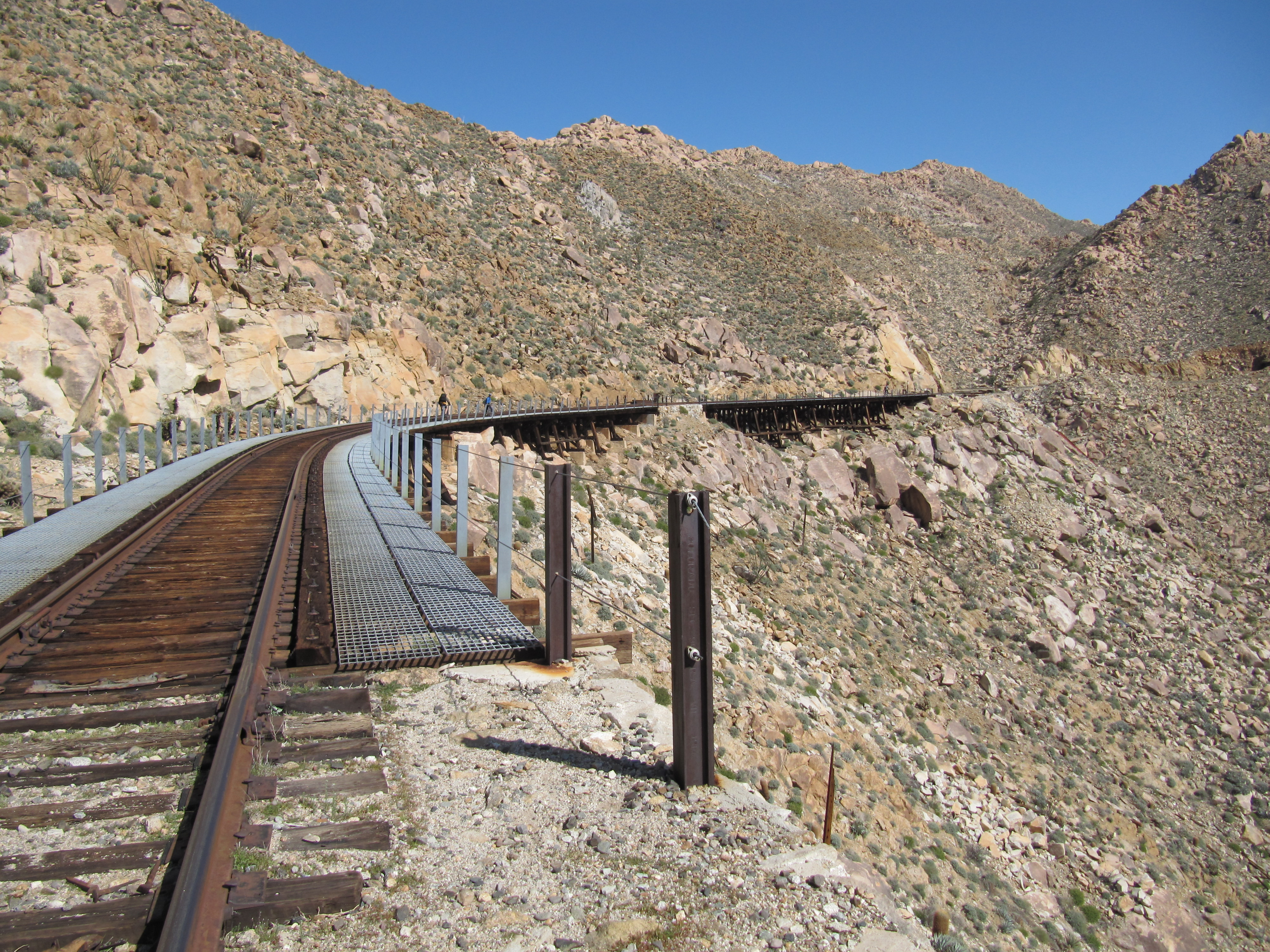
- Carrizo Gorge trestle

Overview
- Operator: San Diego and Imperial Valley Railroad, Pacific Southwest Railway Museum
- Parent company: Southern Pacific Railroad (1932–1979); San Diego Metropolitan Transit Development Board (1979–2005); San Diego Metropolitan Transit System (2005–present)
- Headquarters: James R. Mills Building; 1255 Imperial Avenue; San Diego, California
- Reporting mark: SDAE
- Locale: California and Mexico
- Dates of operation: 1932–present
- Predecessor: San Diego and Arizona Railway

Technical
- Track gauge: 4 ft 8 1/2 in (1,435 mm) standard gauge
Route map
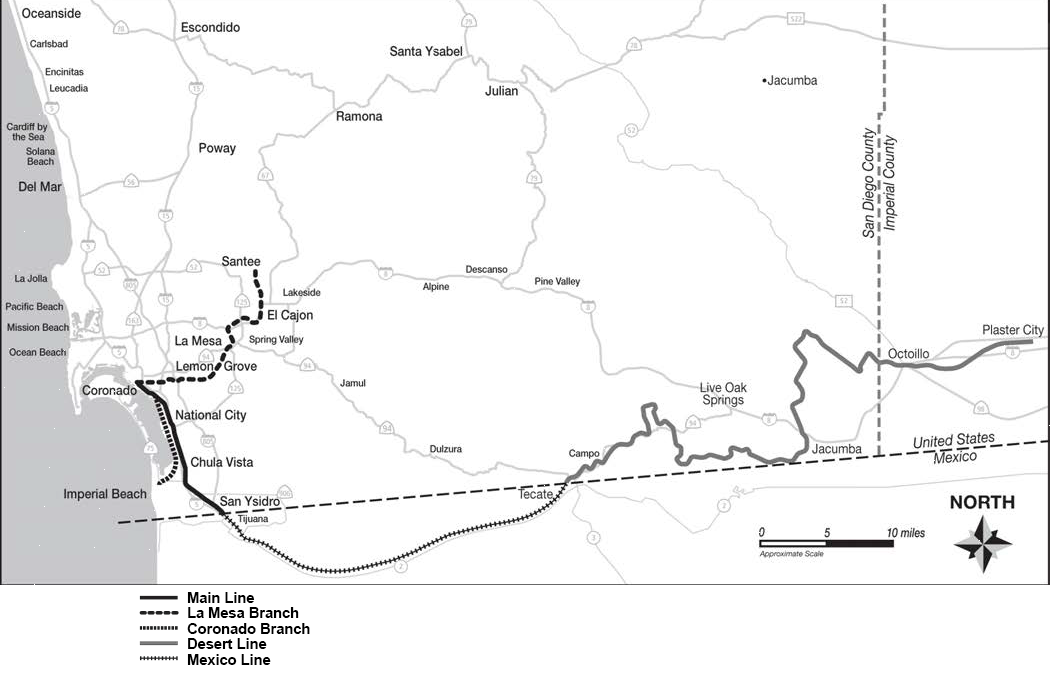

The San Diego and Arizona Eastern Railway (reporting mark SDAE) is a short-line American railroad founded in 1932 as the successor to the San Diego and Arizona Railway (SD&A), which was founded in 1906 by entrepreneur John D. Spreckels. Dubbed "The Impossible Railroad" by many engineers of its day due to the immense logistical challenges involved, the line was established in part to provide San Diego with a direct rail link to the east by connecting with the Southern Pacific Railroad lines in El Centro, California. Since 1979, the San Diego and Arizona Eastern Railway Company has been owned by the San Diego Metropolitan Transit Development Board and its successor, the San Diego Metropolitan Transit System.

== Network ==
At its peak, the SD&A operated 146.4-mile (235.6 km) of rail stretching from San Diego to El Centro. Today, the SD&AE operates approximately 108 miles (174 km) of the original SD&A system, across four segments:

- Main Line: Runs 15.5 miles (24.9 km) from downtown San Diego south to San Ysidro. Also used by the San Diego Trolley's Blue Line.
- La Mesa Branch: Runs 16.1 miles (25.9 km) east to the city of El Cajon. Also used by the San Diego Trolley's Orange Line.
- Coronado Branch (currently unused): Splits from the Main Line in National City and runs 7.2 miles (11.6 km) south to Imperial Beach.
- Desert Line (unused since 2008): Runs 69.9 miles (112.5 km) from the Mexico–United States border near Tecate to Plaster City.

== History ==
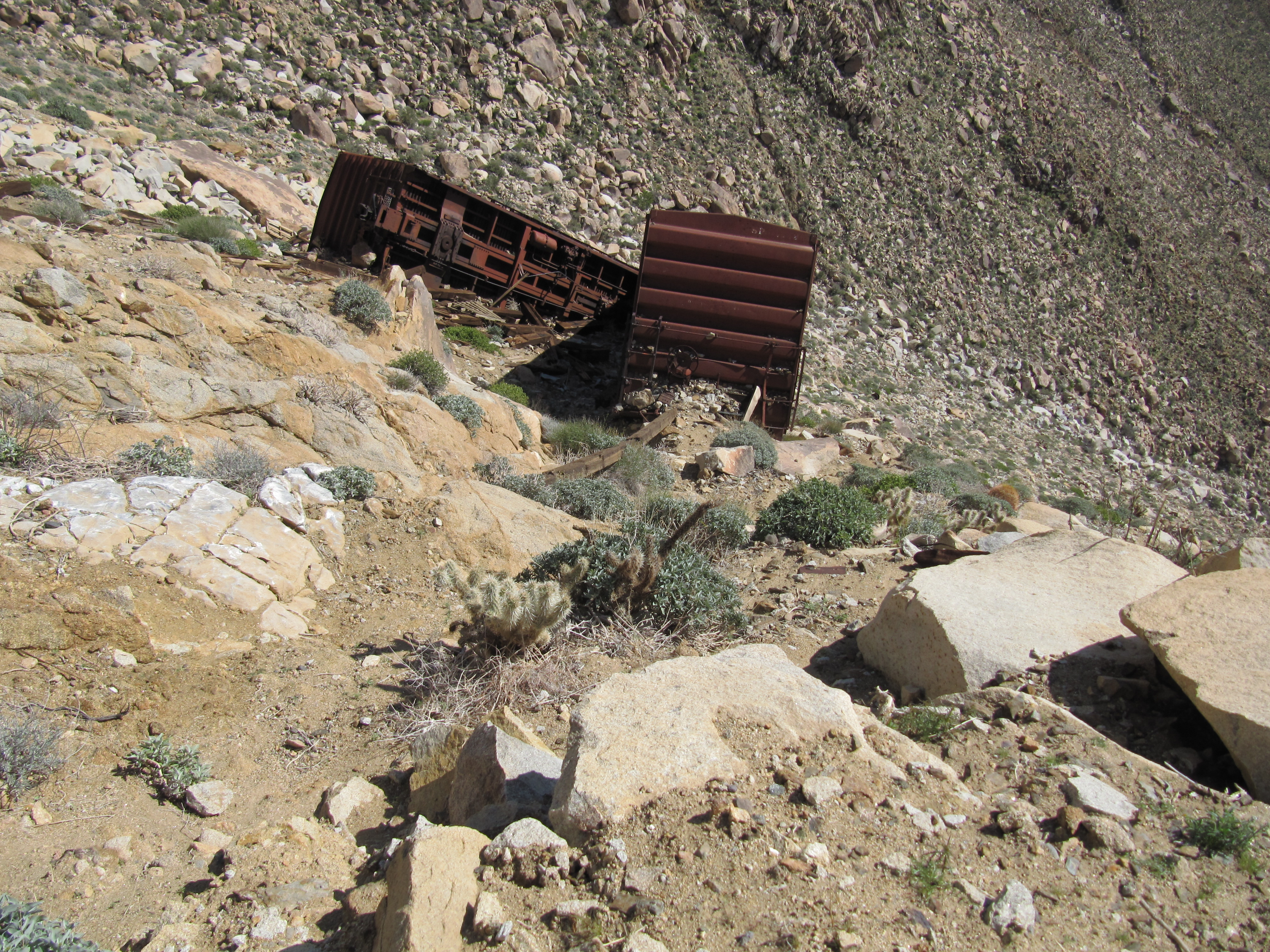
Fallen Southern Pacific Railroad cars in Carrizo Gorge, 2010.

The San Diego and Arizona Eastern Railway traces its origins back to December 14, 1906, when entrepreneur John D. Spreckels announced he would form the San Diego and Arizona Railway (SD&A) to connect San Diego with Southern Pacific (SP) lines in El Centro, California, providing a direct rail link to the east. Spreckels had an agreement with SP to silently fund the project. Groundbreaking for the line took place on September 7, 1907.

The SD&A reached an agreement with the Mexican Government in 1909 to route the tracks over the border. As part of the agreement, the SD&A was ordered to form the Tijuana and Tecate Railway, which would construct and hold a 99-year lease on the 44-mile (70.81 km) Mexican rail segment.

Construction proved extremely challenging. The line was called "The Impossible Railroad" by engineers of its day due to the immense logistical challenges involved. In Mexico, revolutionaries mounted several attacks on SD&A construction crews to conscript soldiers, take supplies, and cut telephone wires. On the U.S. side, the federal government seized control of all railroads in 1917 and stopped construction in an effort to conserve resources during World War I. Construction was later allowed to resume on the grounds that the SD&A would serve military installations.

Construction of the SD&A was completed on November 15, 1919, at a cost of $18 million (equivalent to $334 million in 2025). However, operation of the line would also prove challenging. Rains washed away large amounts of trackage east of San Diego in 1926, 1927, and 1929, leading to financial troubles for the railroad. The most challenging year came in 1932, when floods, landslides, and fires closed three tunnels. Repairs would cost over $600,000 (equivalent to $14,159,000 in 2025). Spreckels had died in 1926 and his descendants no longer wanted to deal with the financial troubles of the railroad, so in 1933, they sold their interests in the railroad to SP. Passenger service on the line ended on January 11, 1951, after years of continued declining patronage. On May 20, 1970, SP relinquished its interest in the Tijuana and Tecate Railway to a Mexican national railway, Ferrocarril Sonora–Baja California.

On September 10, 1976 Hurricane Kathleen destroyed major sections of track and bridges on the line east of San Diego. SP wanted to abandon the railway, a request that was denied by the Interstate Commerce Commission in 1978. The San Diego Metropolitan Transit Development Board (MTDB) stepped in and offered to buy the SD&AE for $18.1 million (equivalent to $80.3 million in 2025) if SP fully repaired the line. The deal closed on August 20, 1979.

The purchase gave MTDB two sections of right-of-way that could be used for mass transit: the SD&AE Main Line from downtown San Diego to the San Ysidro Port of Entry, which would become the Blue Line of the San Diego Trolley; and the SD&AE La Mesa Branch from downtown San Diego to El Cajon, which would become the Orange Line.

As part of the deal, SP retained the section of the Desert Line between Plaster City and El Centro (now the Union Pacific El Centro Subdivision), and all tracks had to remain available for freight service. The board reached a deal with the San Diego and Imperial Valley Railroad on March 8, 1984, to continue to move railcars from the end of the Santa Fe Railway in downtown San Diego to industrial customers in the San Diego area or to the Mexico–United States border in San Ysidro. However, freight service between San Ysidro and Plaster City has struggled. Additional natural disasters and the bi-national nature of the line have closed the line several times since 1979, and the line has been unused since 2008. In November 2021, the lease was cancelled for the most recent lessor of the line, the Baja California Railroad. The Pacific Southwest Railway Museum operates on a portion of the line in Campo.
