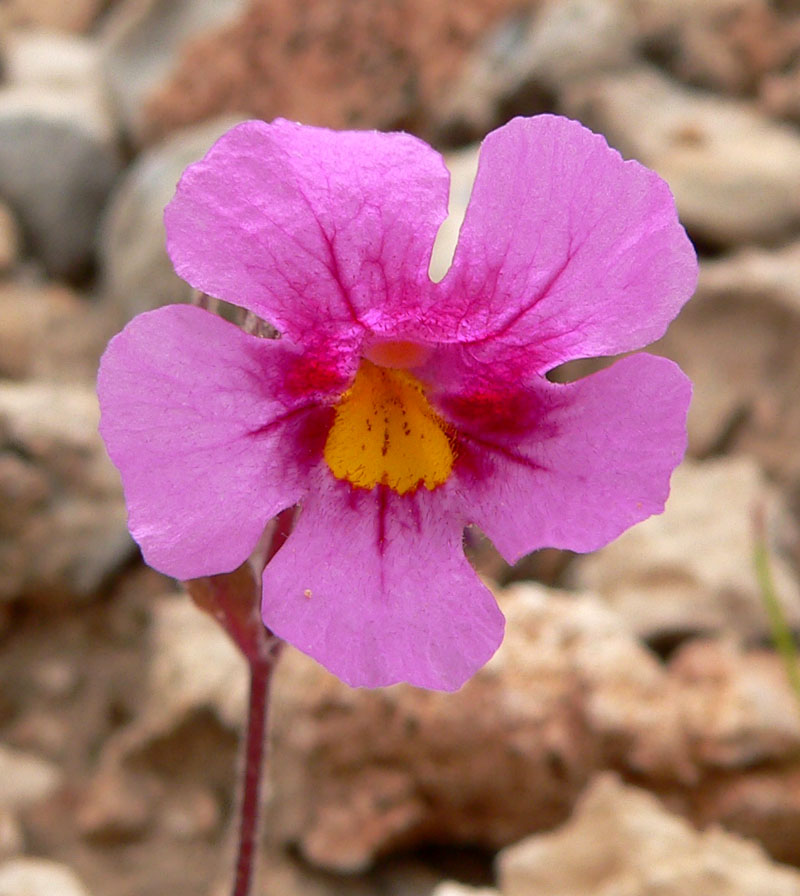

Scientific classification
- Kingdom: Plantae
- Clade: Embryophytes
- Clade: Tracheophytes
- Clade: Angiosperms
- Clade: Eudicots
- Clade: Asterids
- Order: Lamiales
- Family: Phrymaceae
- Genus: Diplacus
- Species: D. bigelovii

Binomial name
- Diplacus bigelovii (A.Gray) G.L.Nesom

Varieties
- Diplacus bigelovii var. bigelovii; Diplacus bigelovii var. cuspidatus (A.L.Grant) G.L.Nesom

Synonyms
- Eunanus bigelovii A.Gray; Mimulus bigelovii (A.Gray) A.Gray; synonyms of var. bigelovii: Mimulus bigelovii var. panamintensis Munz; synonyms of var. cuspidatus: Mimulus bigelovii var. cuspidatus A.L.Grant; Mimulus spissus A.L.Grant; Mimulus spissus var. lincolnensis Edwin; Mimulus washoensis Edwin

= Diplacus bigelovii =

Species of flowering plant

Diplacus bigelovii is a species of monkeyflower known by the common name Bigelow's monkeyflower. It is native to the southwestern United States and Baja California, where it grows in desert and slope habitats. It was formerly known as Mimulus bigelovii.

== Description ==
Diplacus bigelovi is a hairy annual herb producing an erect stem 2 to 25 centimeters tall. The plant is variable in size and shape as well as color, the herbage being green to nearly red in color. The pointed oval or rounded leaves are each up to 3.5 centimeters long and arranged in opposite pairs about the stem.

The tubular base of the flower is surrounded by a reddish-green or purple ribbed calyx of hairy sepals with long lobe tips. The trumpet-shaped flower corolla is roughly one to two centimeters long and has a very narrow tube and a wide mouth. The corolla has two upper lobes and three lower, and is generally magenta or deep pink in color with darker red, purple, and yellow spots in the throat.

== Varieties ==
Two varieties are accepted:

- Diplacus bigelovii var. bigelovii – Arizona, Baja California, California, and Nevada
- Diplacus bigelovii var. cuspidatus (A.L.Grant) G.L.Nesom – Arizona, California, Nevada, and Utah
