= Baja California Railroad =

Mexican Class III freight railroad

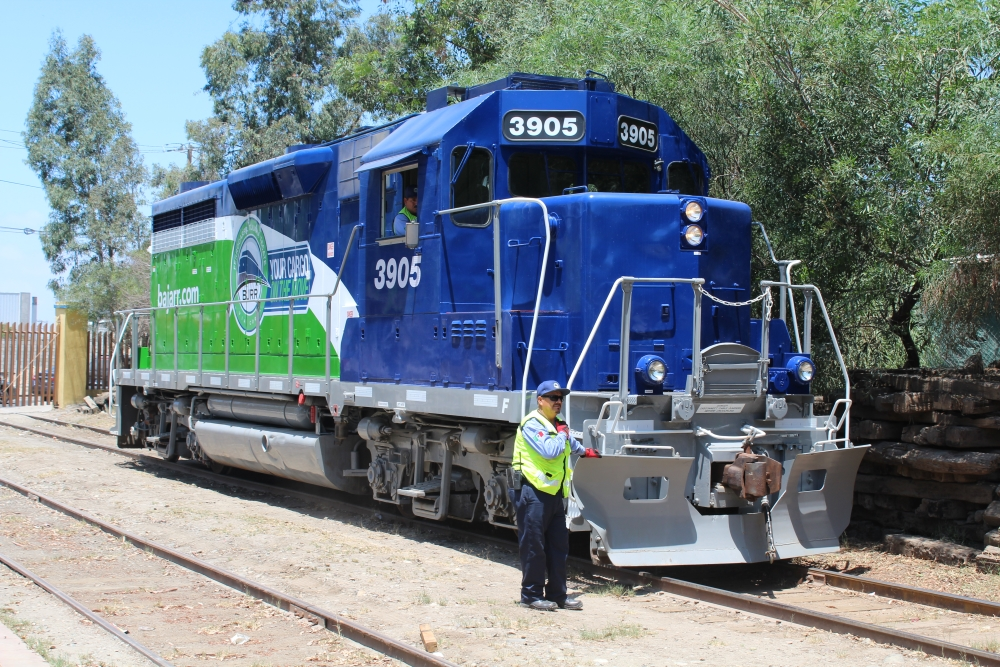
- BJRR 3905, an EMD GP39-3, in García station, Tijuana

Overview
- Stations called at: 5
- Parent company: ADMICARGA
- Headquarters: Av. Ferrocarril #1, Col. Libertad Parte Baja; Tijuana, Baja California
- Reporting mark: BJRR
- Locale: Northwestern Baja California
- Dates of operation: 2010–present

Other
- Website: bajarr.com

Baja California Railroad, Inc. (reporting mark BJRR) is a class III railroad operating in the northwest of Baja California, interchanging with San Diego and Imperial Valley Railroad in San Ysidro, California. After rehabilitation efforts are completed on the Desert Line portion of the railroad, an interchange is also planned with the Union Pacific Railroad in Plaster City, California.

The railroad is managed by ADMICARGA (Administradora de la Vía Corta Tijuana-Tecate), a Baja California government entity. It does not connect to any other railroads in Mexico's rail system.

== Operations ==
BJRR's biggest clients are Z Gas, North StarGas, Empacadora Rosarito, and Heineken Brewery in Tecate, which receives large amounts of grain and corn syrup imports.

Other clients receive shipments such as borax, pig lard, lumber, steel, paper, and cattle feed.

== History ==
Operations began in 2012, using 71.48 kilometres (44.42 mi) of the former track of the Ferrocarril Tijuana y Tecate, which was constructed in 1910 by the San Diego & Arizona Railway from San Diego to El Centro. The BJRR is the technical operating and maintenance assistant of the rail line's Baja California segment under agreement from the railroad's operator, ADMICARGA.

In February 2013, the local Baja California directors of BJRR announced an investment of $20 million to upgrade the neglected track. The first area to be developed was the first 20 kilometres (12 mi) from the border in Tijuana to El Florido as far as Matanuco. Work started in May 2013 with the building of the Tijuana railroad yard; the focus was on more track capacity, in conjunction with the upcoming San Ysidro Freight Rail Yard Improvement Project by SANDAG.

In June 2016, Baja California Railroad secured a 100-year lease with the San Diego Metropolitan Transit System (SDMTS) to rehabilitate and operate an additional 112.75 kilometres (70.06 mi) of track in the United States between Campo, California and Plaster City, California. The line, with 57 bridges and 17 tunnels, will be rehabilitated in three phases: Phase 1, Campo to Jacumba Hot Springs, California; phase 2, Dos Cabezas (near Ocotillo Wells, California) to Plaster City; and phase 3, from Jacumba to Dos Cabezas. The railroad paid SDMTS $1 million per year to retain its lease; Baja California Railroad stopped paying SDMTS beginning in 2020, breaking its lease.

In 2025, ADMICARGA began work on plans to build a train processing facility in Tijuana to enable trains with products assembled in Baja California to enter the United States.

== Route and stations ==
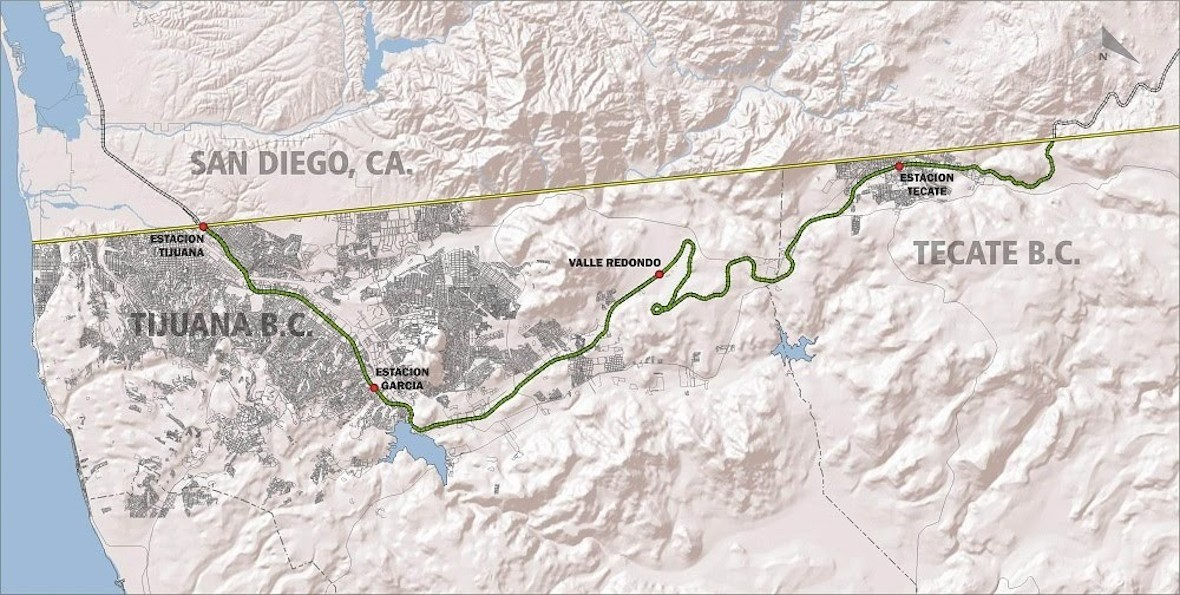
Map of the line, with its four stations. B.C. stand for Baja California.

=== Tijuana Station ===
Tijuana Station is located immediately to the south of the US San Ysidro Port of Entry. The station is now in a 1,000-square-metre (11,000 sq ft) three-story building that contains new administrative offices, an operations and logistics control center, offices for ADMICARGA (the railroad's operator), customs control, a customs agency (broker), the Mexican Secretariat of Agriculture and Rural Development, and the State Committee of Vegetable Sanitation (CESV). There is also space for sixty-eight 60-foot (18 m) cars. The original railway station, built in the late 1920s, will become a railway museum.

=== García Station ===
García Station is farther east, near La Mesa of Tijuana municipality. It has a 470-square-metre (5,100 sq ft) two-story building with a reception area and offices for customer service, administration, and logistics. Also, after renovations, the storage capacity was increased to 3,400 square metres (37,000 sq ft), of which 435 square metres (4,680 sq ft) is for cold storage.

== Tijuana–Tecate tourist train ==
In addition to freight trains, the Baja California Railroad's track is also used by the Tijuana–Tecate tourist train (Spanish: Tren Turístico Tijuana-Tecate). This service consists of a round trip from García Station to Tecate. Rolling stock consists of vintage Gallery Cars (described by The San Diego Union-Tribune as a "60-year old double decker train") hauled by one of the BJRR's locomotives.

The tourist train has been active since at least 2009. The train's operations were suspended from 2020 to 2023, due to the COVID-19 pandemic.

However, in December 2023, Marina del Pilar Ávila Olmeda, the Governor of Baja California, announced that the tourist train would return on January 27, 2024. As promised, the train would run again on January 27 that year, and another run, with a Valentine's Day theme, is scheduled to happen on February 17.
