= Carrizo Gorge =

Protected wilderness area in California, United States

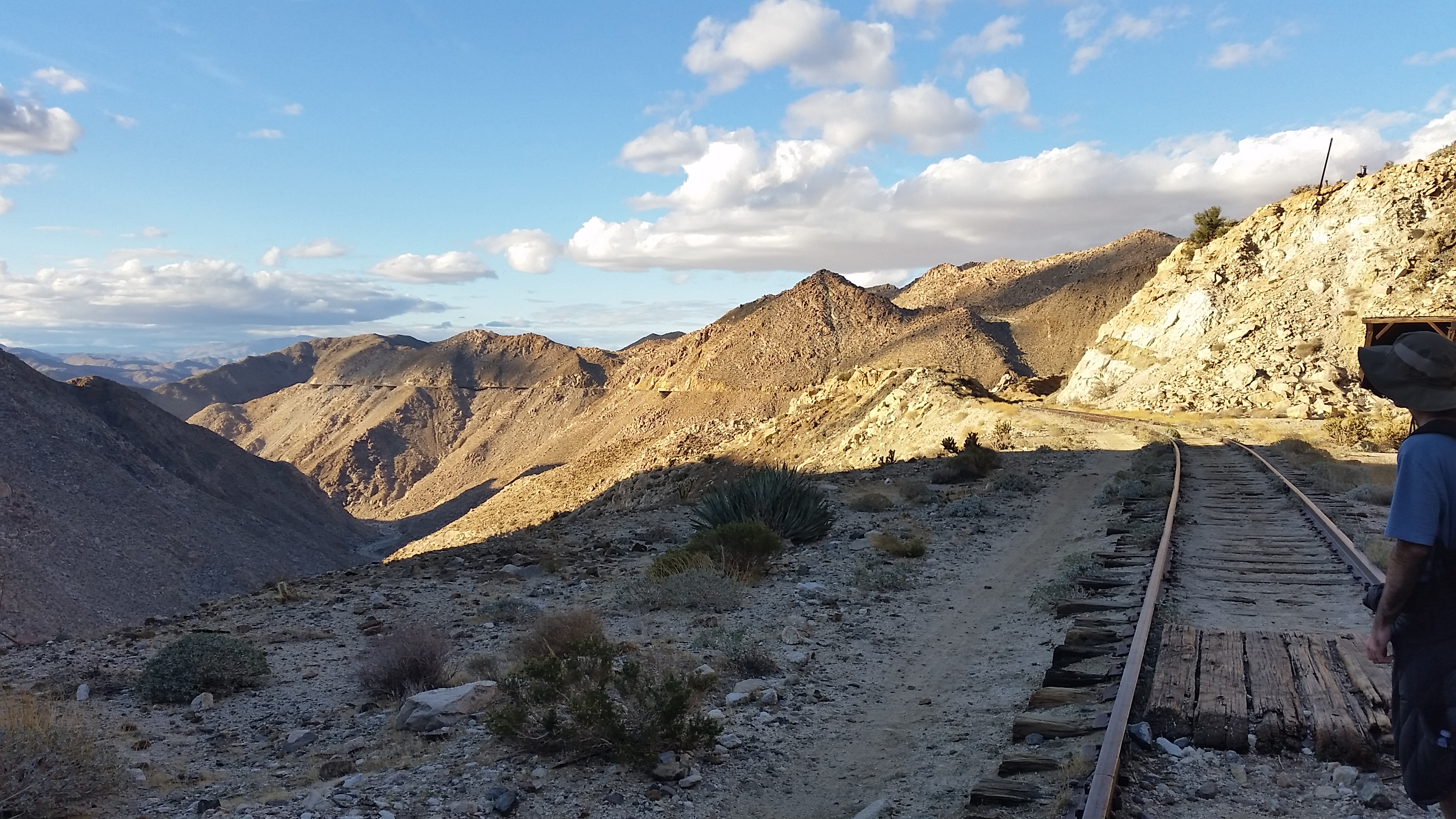
Hiker on the San Diego and Arizona Railway, looking north towards Carrizo Gorge

Carrizo Gorge is a gorge in the Jacumba Mountains in San Diego County, California. Its mouth is at an elevation of 1,411 feet (430 m), where it widens out to become Carrizo Canyon, 1 mi (1.6 km) northeast of Palm Grove. Its head is located in the Jacumba Mountains, 1.5 mi (2.4 km) north of Round Mountain, at an elevation of 2,600 ft (790 m) at 32°39′38″N 116°11′28″W.

It gave its name to the Carrizo Gorge Railway.
