= San Diego and Arizona Railway =

U.S. railroad founded by John D. Spreckels

Overview
- Headquarters: San Diego, California
- Reporting mark: SDA
- Locale: California; Mexico
- Dates of operation: 1919–1933
- Successor: San Diego and Arizona Eastern Railway

Technical
- Track gauge: 4 ft 8 1/2 in (1,435 mm) standard gauge
- Length: 129 miles (208 kilometers)

The San Diego and Arizona Railway (reporting mark SDA) was a 148-mile (238 km) short line U.S. railroad founded by entrepreneur John D. Spreckels, and dubbed "The Impossible Railroad" by engineers of its day due to the immense logistical challenges involved. It linked San Diego, its western terminus, with El Centro, its eastern terminus, where passengers could connect with Southern Pacific's transcontinental lines, eliminating the need to first travel north via Los Angeles or Riverside.

The company charter was executed on December 14, 1906, and the groundbreaking ceremony was held the following September. Numerous delays (including government intervention during World War I) delayed the completion of the line to November 15, 1919. Damage to the lines from both natural disasters and sabotage exerted great financial pressure on the company, and in 1932 Spreckels' heirs sold their interests in the railroad to the Southern Pacific, which changed the name to San Diego & Arizona Eastern Railway (SD&AE).

== History ==
The company was chartered on December 14, 1906, and groundbreaking ceremonies held at the intersection of San Diego's Main and 26th Streets on September 7, 1907. Construction delays, attacks by Mexican revolutionaries, and government intervention during World War I all served to push the construction completion to November 15, 1919 when the "golden spike" was finally driven by John Spreckels. In 1917, the SD&A acquired the San Diego and Southeastern Railway, which operated branches to Foster (formerly the San Diego, Cuyamaca, and Eastern Railroad) and Bonita (formerly the National City & Otay Railway).

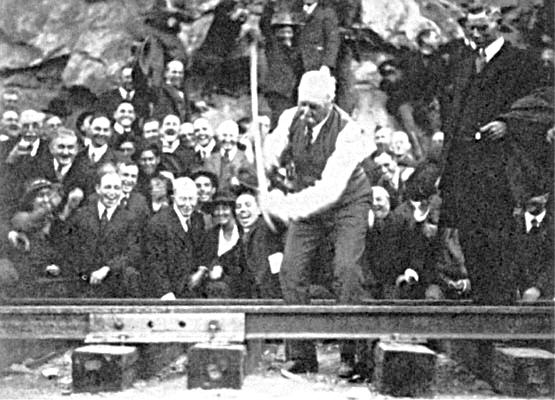
J.D. Spreckels drives the "golden spike" to ceremonially complete the San Diego and Arizona Railway on November 15, 1919.

The first through SD&A passenger train left Campo on the morning of November 30, and made the full run from El Centro to San Diego's downtown union station, Santa Fe Depot, for the official opening of the line on December 1, 1919. The total construction cost of the 146.4 miles (235.6 km) of track laid was approximately $18 million, or some $123,000 per mile; the original estimate was $6 million. The 11-mile (18 km) long segment through Carrizo Gorge (which included 13,385 feet (4,080 m) of tunnels, 17 in all) alone cost over $4 million to construct; the three miles (5 km) of tunnels (21 total) along the entire line ran another $1.8 million. Almost 2.5 miles (4.0 km) of bridges and trestles were built as well.

The tracks departed downtown San Diego south where they crossed the U.S.-Mexico border at San Ysidro. From there the line traversed eastward through Tijuana, then headed northeast through Tecate and back over the border to the town of Campo. To construct and maintain the 44-mile (72 kilometer) stretch through Mexico the SD&A formed the Ferrocarril Tijuana y Tecate, S.A. de C.V., at the behest of the Mexican government. East of Campo the road traveled through Clover Flats, across the Coast Range (elevation 3,660 feet), then descended through the breathtaking but treacherous Carrizo Gorge, the builders' most significant obstacle. Though the SD&A line ended in Seeley, trackage rights gave the railroad the ability to run trains as far east as El Centro and as far south as Calexico. Branch lines ran from downtown to as far north and east as the community of Lakeside, with a separate line which rounded San Diego Bay to service Coronado Heights, Coronado, and North Island.

Damage to the lines from heavy rainstorms, landslides, and fires took a financial toll on the railroad, as did border closings with Mexico. Clashes with the Industrial Workers of the World resulted in acts of vandalism as well. In 1932, financial difficulties forced Spreckels' heirs to sell their interests in the firm for $2.8 million to the Southern Pacific, which renamed the railroad the San Diego and Arizona Eastern Railway (SD&AE).

In 2012 the Mexican government allowed the company Baja Rail to restore and use the track between Tijuana and Tecate. The company has poured ~$20,000,000 into revitalizing the 44 mile stretch of track it is allowed to operate on. The company sought approval from the United States government to build and restore the desert line of the track in San Diego, to allow some more commerce between the two countries. The San Diego Metropolitan Transit System (MTS) stepped in, and Baja Rail partnered with them to restore the track. However, they made little progress and suddenly stopped making payments to MTS in 2020. The fate of the railway's operation is unclear, as of 2025.

== Timeline ==
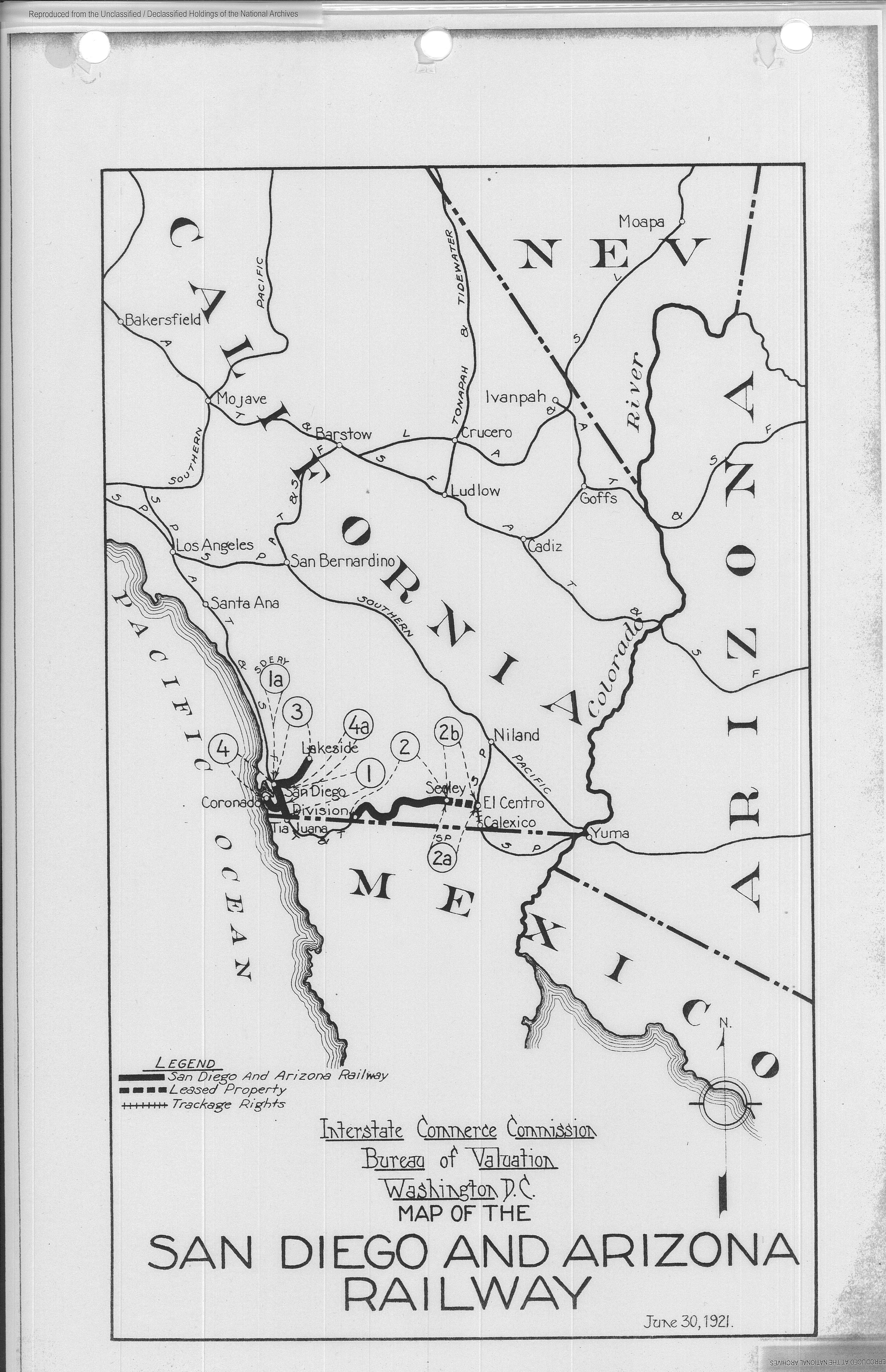
1921 map of the railroad

- 1873: The Texas and Pacific Railroad fails in an attempt to establish a direct rail link between San Diego and the East during the "Panic of 1873."
- 1905: The San Diego and Eastern Railroad (SD&E) conducts a survey for a planned rail line to Arizona but folds prior to commencing track laying.
- December 14, 1906: John D. Spreckels announces he will form the San Diego and Arizona Railway Company (SD&A) and build a 148-mile (238 km) line between San Diego and El Centro. Spreckels has an agreement with the Southern Pacific Railroad (SP) to silently fund the project (ironically, Spreckels later became an outspoken critic of the Southern Pacific Railroad and their monopolistic practices, and often used his newspaper interests as a platform to denounce the company and its officers).
- September 7, 1907: Groundbreaking ceremonies for the SD&A are held in downtown San Diego at the foot of 26th Street (now known as Dewey Street) and Main Street. The line will follow in part the route surveyed by the defunct SD&E.
- 1909: The Mexican Government orders the SD&A to form the Tijuana and Tecate Railway Company, which will construct and hold a 99-year lease on the 44-mile (71 km) Mexican rail segment.
- July 29, 1910: The first passenger train on the SD&A enters Mexico.
- 1911: Mexican revolutionaries mount several attacks on the SD&A construction crews to conscript soldiers and supplies, and cut telephone wires.
- 1916: The "Great Flood" washes out several rail lines. World War I increases the cost of railway construction materials by 50 to 150 percent.
- 1917: The U.S. federal government seizes control of all railroads and stops construction of the SD&A as part of its war effort to conserve resources, but later grants Spreckels special exemption on the grounds the SD&A will serve a military installation. The SD&A absorbs the struggling San Diego and Southeastern Railway (SDSR), assuming operation of the company's steam divisions and gas-electric motor cars. The San Diego Electric Railway (SDERy) continues to operate the interurban line to Chula Vista under lease. The remaining SDSR tracks not damaged in the previous year's flooding function as a "bridge" line between the SD&A and SDERy, which allows for the interchange of freight traffic.
- November 15, 1919: The "golden spike" is driven and construction of the SD&A is completed at a cost of $18 million (three times the original estimate).

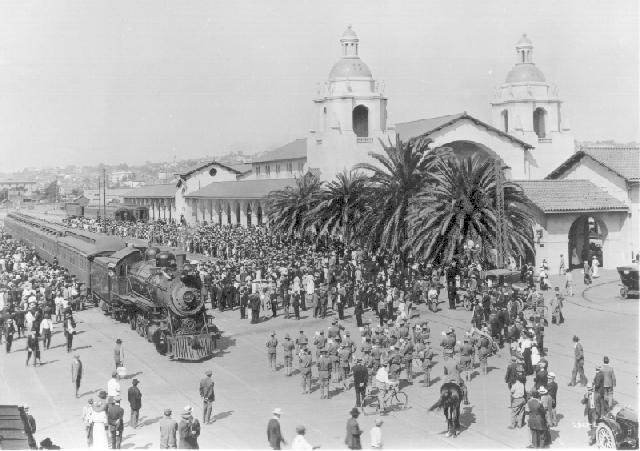
The first SD&A through passenger train "arrives" in San Diego on December 1, 1919 to officially open the line.

- December 1, 1919: The first passenger train "arrives" in San Diego from El Centro for the official line opening ceremony.
- December 10, 1919: Through Pullman service to Chicago is initiated; the cars are switched to the Southern Pacific's Golden State passenger train in Yuma.
- 1922: A new emblem, depicting a scene in the Carrizo Gorge and lettered "San Diego Short Line," is adopted.
- 1926, 1927, and 1929: Heavy rains take out large sections of trackage east of San Diego.
- 1928: Motor service to La Mesa and Lakeside is discontinued. The film Beggars of Life is filmed along the line.
- January 1932: Fire breaks out in Tunnel 3 in Baja California, which leads to a collapse. Repairs take 45 days.
- March 27, 1932: A huge mountain slide, loosened by heavy rains, blocks the line in the vicinity of Tunnel 15. Repairs are completed and freight and passenger services are re-established on July 6 and 7th.
- October 22, 1932: Tunnel 7 burns and is subsequently abandoned.
- October 24, 1932: Financial problems force Spreckels' heirs to transfer their share of SD&A ownership to the Southern Pacific Transportation Company for $2.8 million.
- January 23, 1933: A bypass track along the cliff at Tunnel 7 is completed and the line is reopened to traffic.
- February 1, 1933: The San Diego and Arizona Eastern Railway assumes all operations of the SD&A.
- December 1985, the Pacific Southwest Railway Museum revives the historic San Diego & Arizona Railway name (Reporting mark: SDAX), inaugurating its Golden State demonstration passenger trains over the railway out of Campo, CA east to Miller Creek and west to Division and tunnel four at the international border. These trips continue to this day.

== See also ==
- Baja California Railroad
- Pacific Imperial Railroad
- Carrizo Gorge Railway
- Pacific Southwest Railway Museum
- San Diego Electric Railway
