= Campo, California =

- unincorporated community census-designated place
- Campo Store

- Location of Campo in San Diego County, California.

- Location within the state of California Campo, California (the United States)
- Coordinates: 32°36′23″N 116°28′5″W
- Country: United States
- State: California
- County: San Diego

Area
  - Total: 23.51 sq mi (60.89 km^{2})
  - Land: 23.51 sq mi (60.88 km^{2})
  - Water: 0.0077 sq mi (0.02 km^{2}) 0.03%
- Elevation: 2,802 ft (854 m)

Population (2020)
  - Total: 2,955
  - Density: 125.7/sq mi (48.54/km^{2})
- Time zone: UTC-8 (Pacific (PST))
  - Summer (DST): UTC-7 (PDT)
- ZIP codes: 91906
- Area code: 619
- FIPS code: 06-10508
- GNIS feature ID: 2582962

Campo (Spanish for "Field") is an unincorporated community in the Mountain Empire area of southeastern San Diego County, California, United States. The population was 2,955 at the 2020 United States census. The United States Census Bureau defines Campo as a census-designated place (CDP).

The CDP includes three distinct settlements: Campo, Cameron Corners and Morena Village. Cameron Corners is about one mile (1.6 km) north of Campo. Morena Village is located several miles further north, just east of Morena Dam. These communities all use Campo postal addresses and the ZIP Code 91906.

Campo is part of the United States-Mexico border. The border in Campo is also the trailhead of the Pacific Crest Trail.

== History ==
In 1868, Silas and Luman Gaskill opened the Gaskill Brothers' Stone Store; they were among the area's first residents. Seven years later in 1875, the store became the site of one of the deadliest Old West shootouts in California, with eight killed as the gang of bandits failed to raid the store.

Morena Dam was constructed between 1896 and 1912 to provide water to the San Diego area.

Campo was a station on the San Diego and Arizona Railway, completed in 1919.

Campo was a military town during World War II and was known as Camp Lockett. It was home to a veterans' convalescent hospital, a 300-bed Italian prisoner-of-war camp in Cameron Corners and an all African-American Buffalo Soldiers Cavalry unit which patrolled the border on horseback until 1944.

The United States military continues activities nearby at La Posta Mountain Warfare Training Facility.

== Geography ==
Nearby communities include Boulevard, Potrero, Tecate, Dulzura, Jacumba, Pine Valley, Mount Laguna, Descanso, and Jamul.

According to the United States Census Bureau, the CDP covers an area of 23.5 square miles (60.7 km^{2}), 99.97% of it land, and 0.03% of it water.

It is 50 miles (80 km) southeast of San Diego.

=== Climate ===
Campo has a hot-summer Mediterranean climate (Köppen Csa) with hot, dry summers and cool, relatively wet winters. The diurnal temperature variation is large throughout the year, averaging 35.6 °F or 19.8 °C, which is comparable to such high-desert settlements as Bishop or Alamosa, Colorado. Diurnal temperature variation can reach 50 °F (27.8 °C) on some days, (Note: For example on August 19, 2026, the temperature ranged from 54 °F or 12.2 °C to 104 °F or 40 °C.) and averages 40.9 °F or 22.7 °C in July and August. The high diurnal temperature range means that 69 mornings each year fall below freezing, though no temperature below 10 °F or −12.2 °C (Note: On January 29, 1979) has ever been recorded, whilst the lowest maximum recorded has been 35 °F or 1.7 °C on December 14, 1967. The huge diurnal temperature range makes mornings usually cool even on sweltering summer days: the hottest minimum has been 81 °F or 27.2 °C on 25 August 2026, but from 1991 to 2020 the average highest minimum was 67 °F (19.4 °C) and before the August 2026 record, the hottest minimum had been a mere 74 °F (23.3 °C) on July 23, 2006.

Orographic influences make rainfall about fifty percent higher than in San Diego: the wettest "rain year" was from July 1992 to June 1993 with 34.07 inches or 865.4 millimeters, and the driest from July 2001 to June 2002 with 4.52 inches or 114.8 millimeters. The most precipitation in 24 hours has been 4.26 inches or 108.2 millimeters on November 23, 1965, and the most in one month 18.61 inches or 472.7 millimeters in January 1993. Snowfall is extremely rare: 14.0 inches or 0.36 meters fell in the record cold month of January 1949, but only nine other seasons have ever had measurable snow and none have accumulated more than 3.0 inches (0.076 m).

Climate data for Campo, California (1991–2020 normals, extremes 1950–present)
Month	Jan	Feb	Mar	Apr	May	Jun	Jul	Aug	Sep	Oct	Nov	Dec	Year
Record high °F (°C)	85 (29)	89 (32)	92 (33)	99 (37)	103 (39)	110 (43)	111 (44)	108 (42)	110 (43)	105 (41)	94 (34)	86 (30)	111 (44)
Mean maximum °F (°C)	77.7 (25.4)	78.1 (25.6)	83.4 (28.6)	89.7 (32.1)	94.4 (34.7)	100.6 (38.1)	104.2 (40.1)	104.2 (40.1)	100.8 (38.2)	94.1 (34.5)	85.7 (29.8)	78.7 (25.9)	106.0 (41.1)
Mean daily maximum °F (°C)	63.6 (17.6)	64.0 (17.8)	67.9 (19.9)	72.6 (22.6)	78.8 (26.0)	87.7 (30.9)	93.9 (34.4)	95.1 (35.1)	90.3 (32.4)	80.2 (26.8)	70.9 (21.6)	63.2 (17.3)	77.4 (25.2)
Daily mean °F (°C)	49.2 (9.6)	49.5 (9.7)	52.1 (11.2)	55.3 (12.9)	60.6 (15.9)	66.5 (19.2)	73.4 (23.0)	74.6 (23.7)	70.0 (21.1)	61.4 (16.3)	53.9 (12.2)	48.3 (9.1)	59.6 (15.3)
Mean daily minimum °F (°C)	34.7 (1.5)	35.0 (1.7)	36.3 (2.4)	38.1 (3.4)	42.4 (5.8)	45.2 (7.3)	53.0 (11.7)	54.2 (12.3)	49.7 (9.8)	42.6 (5.9)	37.0 (2.8)	33.4 (0.8)	41.8 (5.4)
Mean minimum °F (°C)	22.2 (−5.4)	23.2 (−4.9)	26.6 (−3.0)	27.6 (−2.4)	32.1 (0.1)	35.8 (2.1)	40.6 (4.8)	40.9 (4.9)	37.1 (2.8)	30.7 (−0.7)	25.7 (−3.5)	22.0 (−5.6)	19.6 (−6.9)
Record low °F (°C)	10 (−12)	12 (−11)	15 (−9)	20 (−7)	25 (−4)	29 (−2)	34 (1)	30 (−1)	29 (−2)	22 (−6)	16 (−9)	12 (−11)	10 (−12)
Average precipitation inches (mm)	3.09 (78)	3.45 (88)	2.28 (58)	1.04 (26)	0.38 (9.7)	0.09 (2.3)	0.29 (7.4)	0.42 (11)	0.40 (10)	0.67 (17)	1.03 (26)	2.44 (62)	15.58 (396)
Average snowfall inches (cm)	0.1 (0.25)	0.0 (0.0)	0.0 (0.0)	0.1 (0.25)	0.0 (0.0)	0.0 (0.0)	0.0 (0.0)	0.0 (0.0)	0.0 (0.0)	0.0 (0.0)	0.0 (0.0)	0.1 (0.25)	0.3 (0.75)
Average precipitation days (≥ 0.01 in)	6.9	7.8	6.6	4.7	2.0	0.4	1.6	1.7	2.1	2.5	4.5	7.1	47.9
Average snowy days (≥ 0.1 in)	0.0	0.0	0.1	0.0	0.0	0.0	0.0	0.0	0.0	0.0	0.0	0.0	0.1
Source: NOAA

== Demographics ==
Historical population
Census	Pop.	Note	%±
2010	2,684		—
2020	2,955		10.1%
U.S. Decennial Census; 1860–1870 1880-1890; 1900 1910 1920; 1930 1940 1950; 1960 1970 1980; 1990 2000 2010; 2020

Campo first appeared as a census designated place in the 2010 U.S. census.

=== Racial and ethnic composition ===
Campo CDP, California – Racial and ethnic composition Note: the US Census treats Hispanic/Latino as an ethnic category. This table excludes Latinos from the racial categories and assigns them to a separate category. Hispanics/Latinos may be of any race.
Race / Ethnicity (NH = Non-Hispanic)	Pop 2010	Pop 2020	% 2010	% 2020
White alone (NH)	1,634	1,488	60.88%	50.36%
Black or African American alone (NH)	105	61	3.91%	2.06%
Native American or Alaska Native alone (NH)	60	87	2.24%	2.94%
Asian alone (NH)	24	42	0.89%	1.42%
Native Hawaiian or Pacific Islander alone (NH)	6	7	0.22%	0.24%
Other race alone (NH)	0	23	0.00%	0.78%
Mixed race or Multiracial (NH)	61	160	2.27%	5.41%
Hispanic or Latino (any race)	794	1,087	29.58%	36.79%
Total	2,684	2,955	100.00%	100.00%

=== 2020 census ===
As of the 2020 census, Campo had a population of 2,955 and a population density of 125.7 inhabitants per square mile (48.5/km^{2}).

The age distribution was 25.6% under the age of 18, 7.7% aged 18 to 24, 24.3% aged 25 to 44, 26.3% aged 45 to 64, and 16.1% who were 65 years of age or older. The median age was 39.0 years. For every 100 females, there were 110.0 males, and for every 100 females age 18 and over, there were 114.9 males age 18 and over.

The census reported that 98.6% of the population lived in households, 1.4% lived in non-institutionalized group quarters, and no one was institutionalized. Of residents, 0.0% lived in urban areas and 100.0% lived in rural areas.

There were 969 households, out of which 34.9% included children under the age of 18, 49.4% were married-couple households, 7.3% were cohabiting couple households, 21.1% had a female householder with no partner present, and 22.2% had a male householder with no partner present. 22.4% of households were one person, and 10.0% were one person aged 65 or older. The average household size was 3.01. There were 688 families (71.0% of all households).

There were 1,036 housing units at an average density of 44.1 units per square mile (17.0 units/km^{2}), of which 969 (93.5%) were occupied and 6.5% were vacant. Of the occupied units, 73.3% were owner-occupied and 26.7% were occupied by renters. The homeowner vacancy rate was 1.2%, and the rental vacancy rate was 3.3%.

== Features ==
Campo is home to three museums: the Pacific Southwest Railway Museum which also offers historic train rides, the Motor Transport Museum at the historic Feldspar Mill, and the Gaskill Brothers' Stone Store.

A CDF fire station is located at 31577 State Route 94. The 1998 Cameron Corners, California 7.5-minute quadrangle plots the station near Dewey Place and SR 94. A Southern California Automobile Association map, believed to be c. 1910–1930, shows a business named "Dewey Store" in Cameron Corners. The business is plotted on the north side of SR 94 just east of County Road S1. This may be a variant name of Dewey Place. (Note: Date on SCAA map is illegible. S1 may also be called Bankhead Springs Road.)

There is a county road maintenance station on Forrest Gate Road and a county fire station at Jeb Stewart and Parker roads.

Large employers in the area include US Department of Homeland Security Border Patrol and the San Diego County, California Probation, Juvenile Ranch Facility, (population 250).

According to a September 9, 2004 San Diego Union Tribune article, foster care activist Father Joe Carroll proposed building a foster camp for children here. The proposed name was, "Promiseland Ranch," and the proposed facility would encompass about 600 acres (2.4 km^{2}). Although the project was approved by the Board of Supervisors in 2008, it has since been abandoned for lack of funds.

Campo is near the official southern terminus of the Pacific Crest Trail, a recreational hiking and equestrian trail extending 2,650 miles (4,260 km) north to the Canada–United States border.

== Transportation ==
The town is along the line of the former Southern Pacific (originally the San Diego and Arizona Railway). Freight operations are currently embargoed (not offered) by the Carrizo Gorge Railway (currently the Pacific Imperial Railroad), while passenger operations are operated by the Pacific Southwest Railway Museum.

== Schools ==
31360 State Route 94: federal records report three schools in Campo. The schools are:

- Rancho Del Campo High School - Juvenile Ranch (Detention) Facility (9–12)
- Campo Elementary School (K-8)
- Campo Continuation (at the old Campo Elementary School)
- Hillside Alternative Junior/Senior High (7–12)
- Cottonwood Community Day (7–12)
- Mountain Empire Junior/Senior High (7–12)

About 1.3 miles (2.1 km) north in Cameron Corners, Campo Elementary (K-6) is located at 1654 Buckman Springs Rd. This is considered in Campo for postal addresses.

== See also ==
- Tecate, California
- Manzanita, San Diego County, California
- Camp Lockett
