= Plaster City, California =

Gypsum plant in California

Coordinates: 32°47′33″N 115°51′31″W

Plaster City, California is a company town with a large gypsum quarry and plant owned by United States Gypsum (USG) in Imperial County, California. It is located 17 miles (27 km) west of El Centro, at an elevation of 105 feet (32 m), a two-hour drive south of Palm Springs, or a 90-minute drive east from San Diego.

The quarry and supporting railroad were started in 1920 by Imperial Valley Gypsum and Oil Corporation founder Samuel Dunnaway, a pharmacist from San Diego, then acquired by United States Gypsum in 1945. Plaster City is the southern terminus of the last industrial narrow gauge railroad in the United States. The 3 ft (914 mm) gauge line runs from another quarry about 22 miles (35 km) miles to the northwest, bringing gypsum to the plant. Plaster City is served by the former San Diego and Arizona Eastern Railway, owned by Union Pacific Railroad to the east and the San Diego Metropolitan Transit System to the west. The route to the west is currently inactive.

The first post office at Plaster City opened in 1924. The ZIP Code is 92251.

Plaster City is surrounded by two Off-Highway Vehicle (OHV) Areas operated by the Bureau of Land Management: Plaster City West Off-Highway Vehicle Area and Plaster City East Off-Highway Vehicle Area. The Juan Bautista de Anza National Historic Trail runs through the OHV areas.

== Publicity and media ==
In the 1963 film It's a Mad, Mad, Mad, Mad World, Ethel Merman's character is seen talking on a pay telephone to her son, saying that she was "in a place called Plaster City."

In 1993 Plaster City was briefly the locale of the fully restored Eureka locomotive, one of the last narrow gauge steam locomotives from the height of railroad development in the West.
