= Southern Pacific 2467 =

Preserved SP P-8 class 4-6-2 locomotive

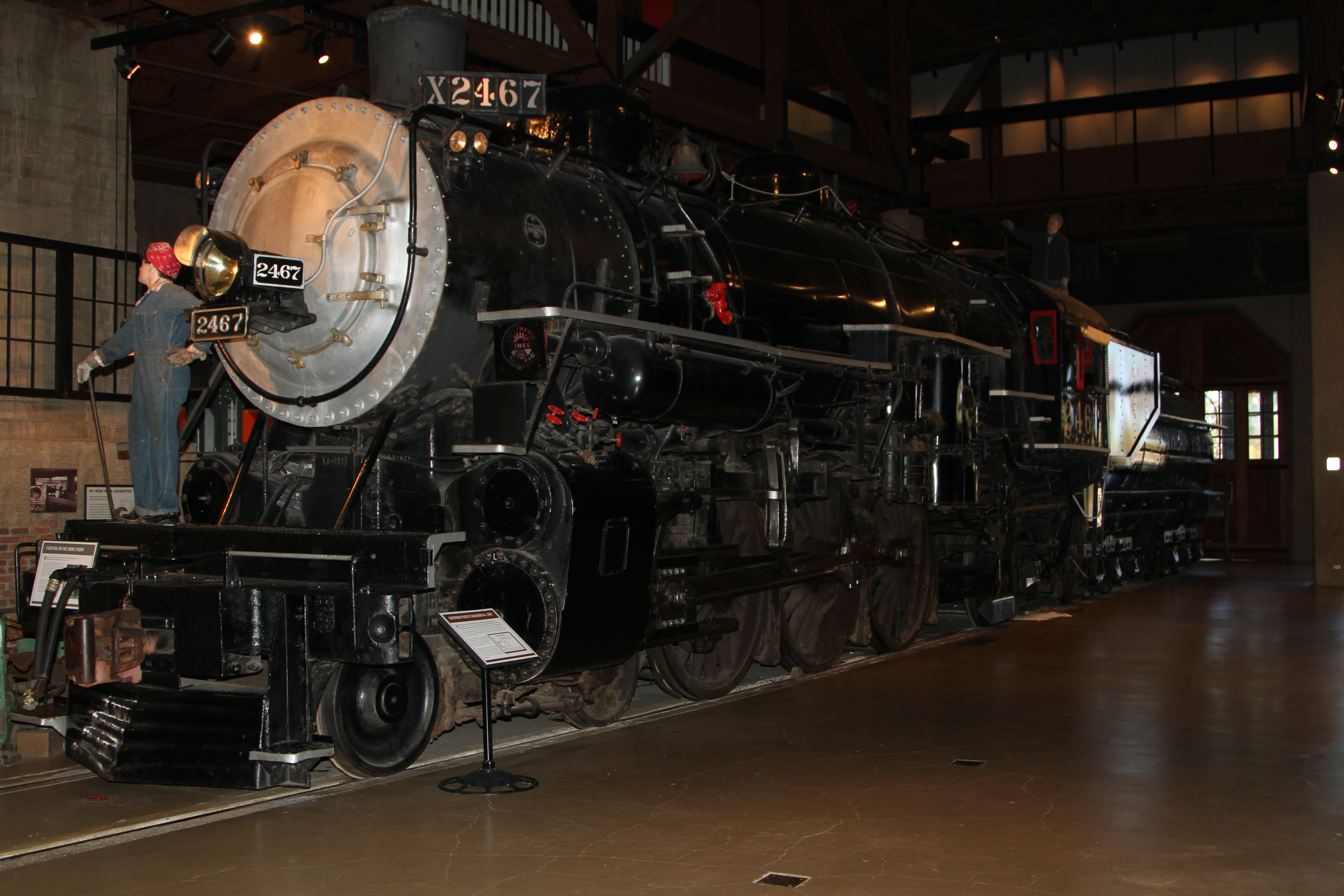
- SP No. 2467 on static display at the California State Railroad Museum in November 2009
Type and origin
- Power type: Steam
- Builder: Baldwin Locomotive Works
- Serial number: 54472
- Build date: January 1921
Specifications
- Configuration
  - Whyte: 4-6-2
  - UIC: 2'C1'
- Gauge: 4 ft 8 1/2 in (1,435 mm)
- Driver dia.: 73 in (1,854 mm)
- Wheelbase: 75.80 ft (23.10 m)
  - Engine: 35.50 ft (10.82 m)
  - Drivers: 13 ft (4.0 m)
- Axle load: 60,700 lb (27,500 kg)
- Adhesive weight: 180,000 lb (82,000 kg)
- Loco weight: 297,000 lb (134,700 kg)
- Tender weight: 160,800 lb (72,900 kg)
- Total weight: 457,800 lb (207,700 kg)
- Fuel type: Oil
- Fuel capacity: 4,000 US gal (15,000 L; 3,300 imp gal)
- Water cap.: 12,000 US gal (45,000 L; 10,000 imp gal)
- Firebox
  - Grate area: 70.40 sq ft (6.540 m^{2})
- Boiler pressure: 210 psi (1.4 MPa)
- Heating surface
  - Firebox: 283 sq ft (26.3 m^{2})
- Cylinders: Two, outside
- Cylinder size: 25 in × 30 in (640 mm × 760 mm)
- Valve gear: Walschaerts
- Valve type: Piston valves
- Loco brake: Air
- Train brakes: Air
- Couplers: Knuckle
Performance figures
- Tractive effort: 45,850 lbf (203.95 kN)
- Factor of adh.: 4.15
Career
- Operators: Southern Pacific Railroad; Pacific Locomotive Association, Inc.
- Class: P-8
- Number in class: 15
- Numbers: SP 2467
- Retired: December 26, 1956 (revenue service); January 2003 (excursion service)
- Restored: June 1999
- Current owner: California State Railroad Museum
- Disposition: On static display

Southern Pacific 2467 is a preserved P-8 class 4-6-2 "Pacific" type steam locomotive, built by the Baldwin Locomotive Works (BLW) in January 1921, it was used by the Southern Pacific Railroad (SP) to pull passenger trains until it was retired from service in 1956. On July 25, 1960, it was donated to the city of Oakland, California, who had it placed on display at the Harrison Railroad Park. In July 1990 a restoration began by the Friends of the 2467, which later merged into the Pacific Locomotive Association. In June 1999 it was returned to operation and made an appearance at Railfair 1999. Although serviceable, SP 2467 is on display and is owned by the California State Railroad Museum (CSRM) in Sacramento, California.

== History ==
=== Revenue service ===
No. 2467 is one of 15 4-6-2 heavy "Pacific" type steam locomotives built by Baldwin Locomotive Works (BLW) in January 1921 for the Southern Pacific Railroad (SP), designated the P-8 class, and numbered 2461-2475. These locomotives were initially used to serve the SP’s long-distance passenger trains, such as the Overland Route from Ogden, Utah, to Oakland and the Sunset Limited between Los Angeles and El Paso, Texas, until the SP’s larger 4-8-2 “Mountain” types replaced them. No. 2467 pulled its last long-distance passenger train from Fresno to Oakland on February 10, 1945.

The locomotive was subsequently reassigned to pull local passenger trains and commuter trains between Sacramento and Oakland and the San Francisco-San Jose, commuter route. No. 2467 pulled its last revenue train on December 26, 1956, before it was removed from the SP’s active list. On July 25, 1960, No. 2467 was donated to the city of Oakland, where the locomotive was put on static display at a park that would later become Harrison Railroad Park. The latter idea came from District 3 City Councilman Howard Rilea, who was a retired railroad engineer who had ridden on No. 2467 during its final long-distance run in 1945.

=== Restoration and excursion service ===
In the early 1980s, a group called the “Friends of the 2467” (later merged into the Pacific Locomotive Association (PLA)) was formed with the goal of restoring No. 2467 to operational status. In July 1990, the locomotive was removed from Harrison Railroad Park and moved to a nearby yard, where a restoration effort called Project 2467 commenced. The restoration process included replacing the flues and tubes, fabricating the boiler jacketing, repairing the firebox, and refurbishing the cab. In May 1999, No. 2467 was successfully test fired, and the following month, the locomotive was approved to legally operate by the Federal Railroad Administration (FRA).

After final applications were made to the locomotive, the restoration crew moved No. 2467 to Sacramento, where it attended Railfair ‘99 at the California State Railroad Museum (CSRM). Once the fair was over, No. 2467 was sent back to oakland. Until it the 2467 would be towed to the Sierra Railroad For its Iron Horse roundup event that was meant to be hosted in november when it had a mechanical failure. This was caused by the Front axle Shifting During the Move Over the union pacific Altamont Line so the locomotive was sent to stockton for storage. until that year in November it was towed to the Golden Gate Railroad Museum (GGRM), which owns another SP P-8 No. 2472) at the Hunters Point shipyard in San Francisco, where No. 2467 was stored and put into occasional excursion service. In January 2003, the GGRM hosted a photo session that featured Numbers 2467 and 2472 operating together.

=== Disposition ===
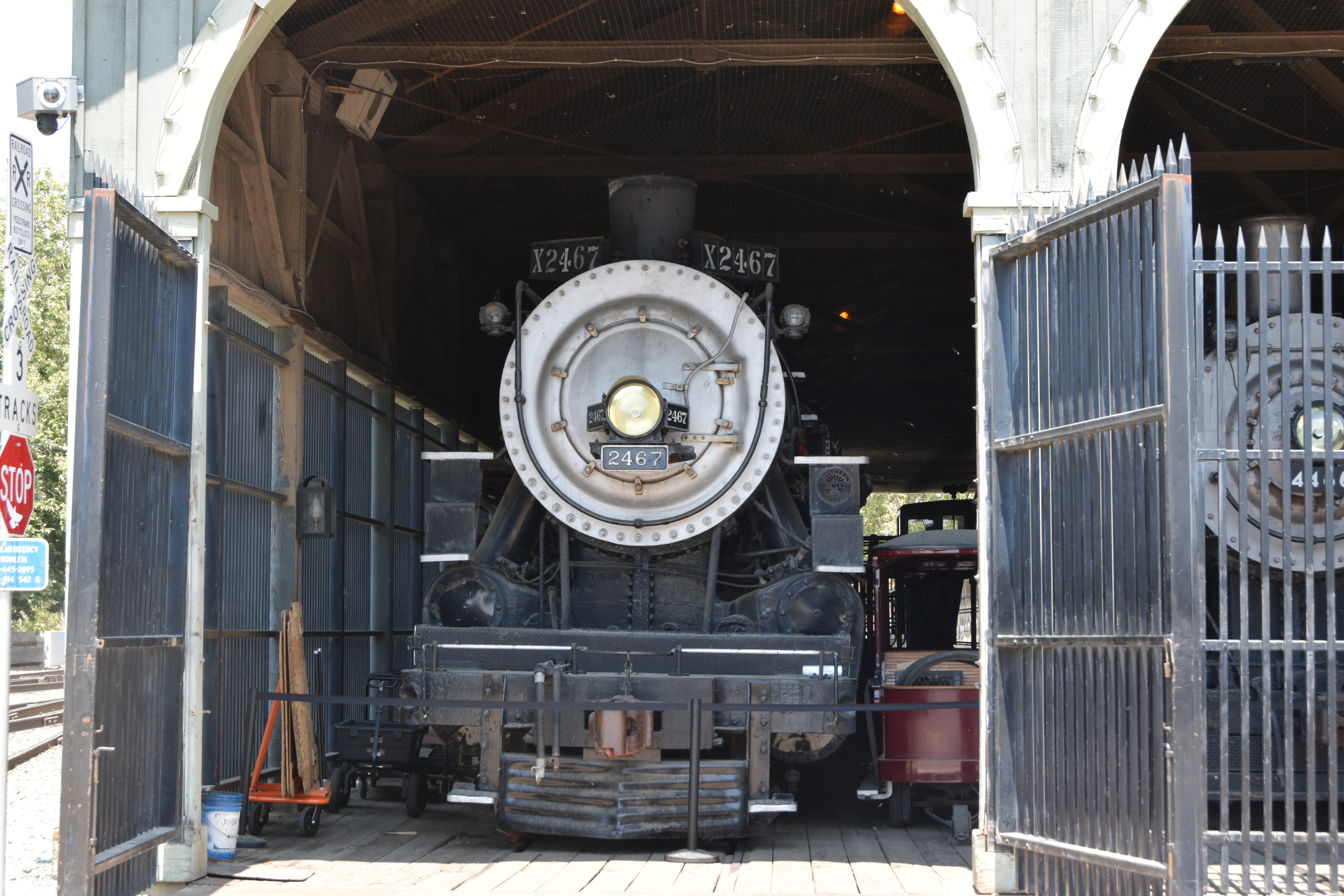
SP 2467's new spot outside of the Central Pacific Depot in 2021

In August 2005, the US Navy ordered the GGRM to vacate all of their equipment from Hunters Point, since ownership of the site was being turned over to the city of San Francisco. No. 2467, which was still owned by the PLA, was subsequently towed back to the CSRM in Sacramento, where a long-term loan was signed to keep the locomotive in storage at the CSRM’s property. As of November 2023,The CSRM Acquired Full Ownership Of the locomotive

== Surviving classmates ==
It has two surviving classmates:

- P-8 class Southern Pacific 2472, owned by the Golden Gate Railroad Museum and once operated on occasional services at the Niles Canyon Railway until 2015, which is now at the Northwestern Pacific Railroad, where it is currently awaiting its 1,472-day inspection and overhaul.
- P-10 class Southern Pacific 2479, owned by the California Trolley and Railroad Corporation, undergoing restoration to operating condition at the Santa Clara County Fairgrounds in San Jose. As of 2023, SP 2479 has been moved to the Niles Canyon Railway in Sunol, for completion of its restoration and eventual operation of excursions.

== See also ==
- Southern Pacific 2353
- Southern Pacific 745
- Southern Pacific 786
- Santa Fe 1010
