= San Jose Steam Railroad Museum =

Museum in Santa Clara County, California

The San Jose Steam Railroad Museum is a planned railroad museum within Santa Clara County that has been under development by California Trolley and Railroad Corporation since 1992. This project was originally intended to be located at the Santa Clara County Fairgrounds in San Jose, California; however in 2002, the Board of Supervisors voted to rescind support of the proposed railroad museum at that location. Since then, CTRC has been actively working with various public agencies for a suitable alternate site. The proposed location is near downtown San Jose.

== Lenzen Roundhouse ==
The Lenzen Roundhouse consists of the six stall San Jose Roundhouse, 80-foot (24.38 m) turntable, water tower and herder's shack. The roundhouse was donated to the CRTC by Southern Pacific Railroad. The roundhouse was disassembled and moved to the Santa Clara County Fairgrounds(37.300690°N 121.856811°W) for storage until a site is found for the museum.

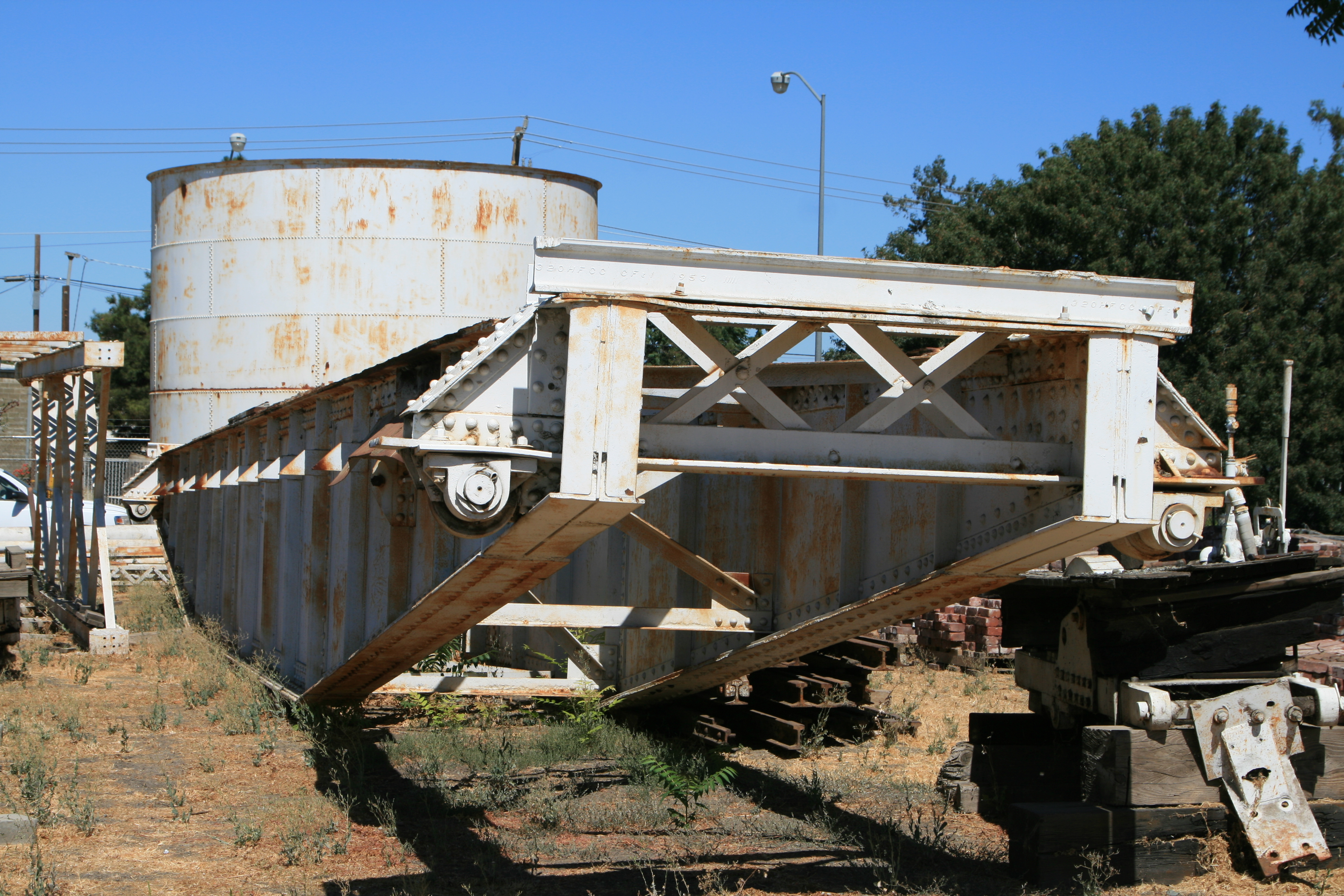
Lenzen Roundhouse Turntable and Water tower at the San Jose Fair Grounds.

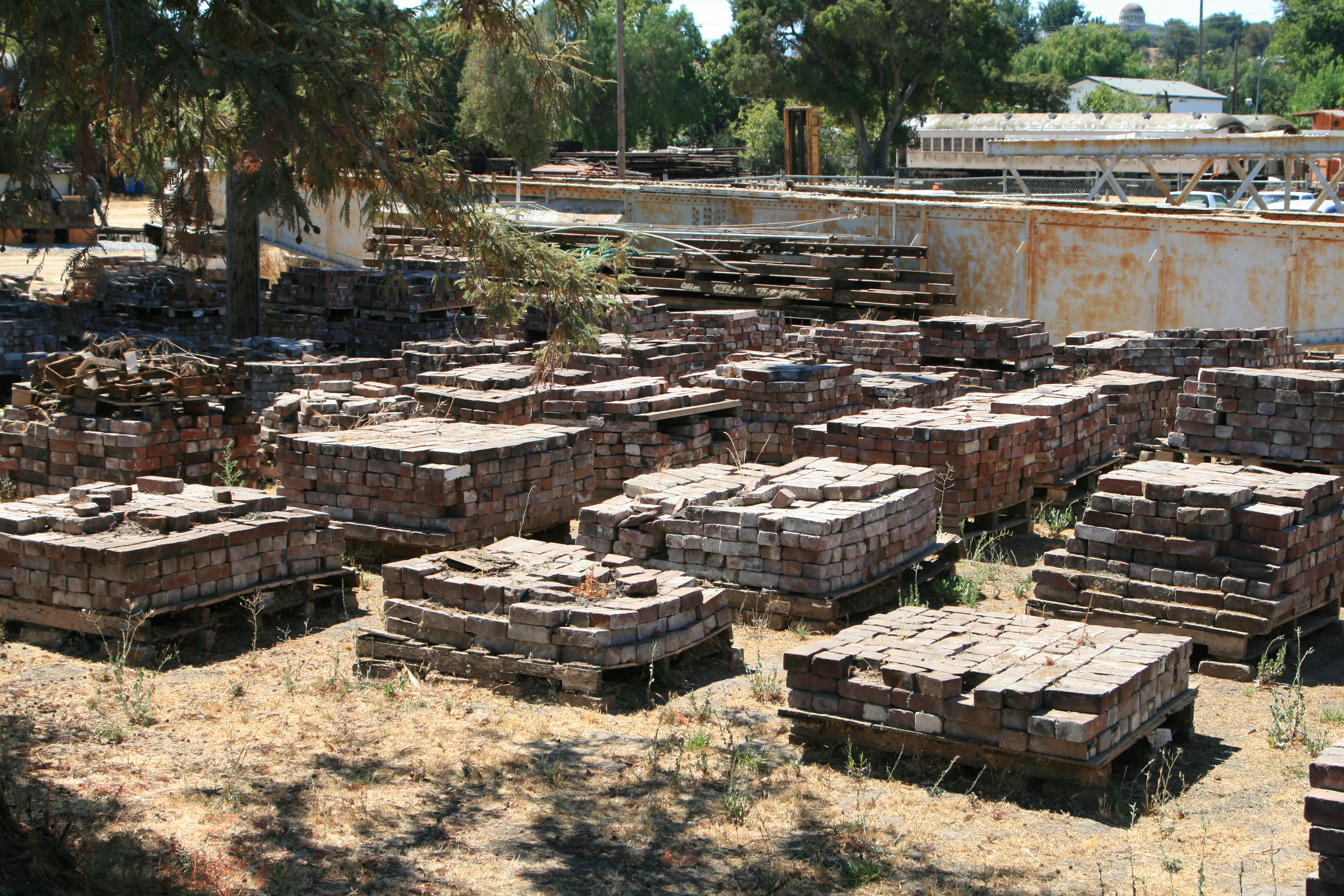
Original building materials from the Lenzen Roundhouse to be used in the San Jose Steam Railroad Museum.

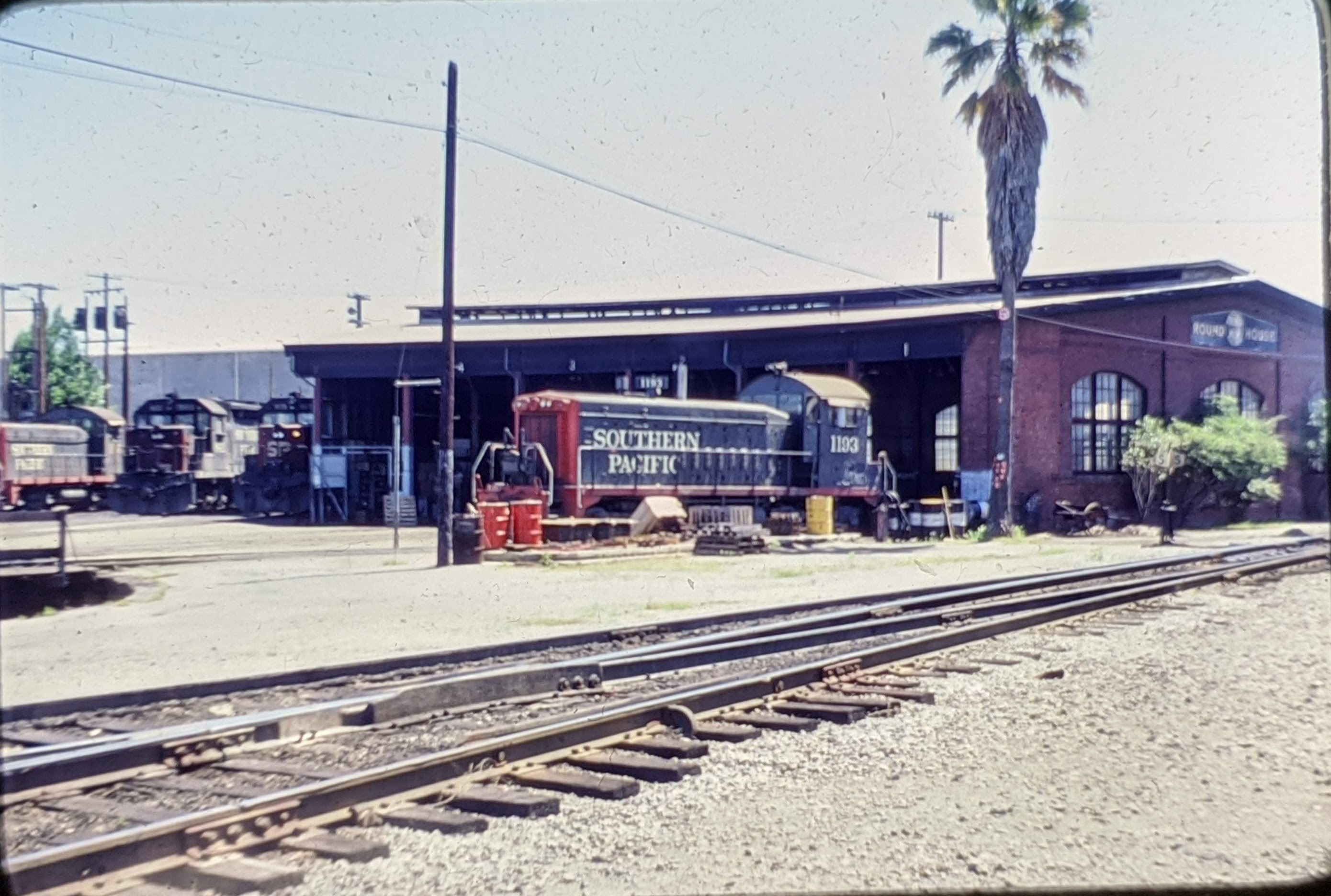
Southern Pacific roundhouse, Lenzen Ave - 1977

== Locomotives ==
- The Corporation is restoring a 1923 steam locomotive, Southern Pacific 2479, to working order for operation and display at the Santa Clara Fairgrounds. The locomotive can be viewed while under restoration on weekends when the restoration crew is present.
- The CTRC has cosmetically restored 1913 steam locomotive Southern Pacific 1215 for display. The locomotive is now on display at the History Park at Kelley Park in San Jose, CA
- "Little Buttercup" (Santa Fe 5), built in 1899 are on display at the History Park at Kelley Park Trolley Barn until the museum is finished. Little Buttercup was on permanent loan from the California State Railroad Museum until CSRM formally transferred ownership to the California Trolley and Railroad Corporation in 2008.

== Rolling stock ==
- Bay window Caboose 1589
- Two 1920s-era Passenger Coaches

== See also ==
- List of heritage railroads in California
- List of museums in California
