= Southern Pacific Class P-8 =

Class of 4-6-2 "Pacific" type steam locomotives

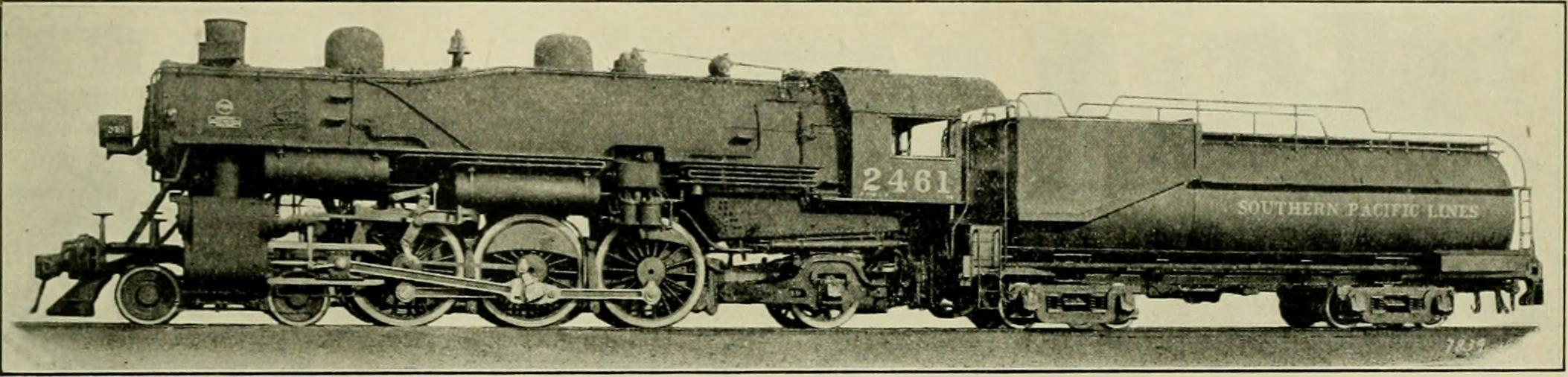
- Southern Pacific P-8 No. 2461 when it rolled out of Baldwin
Type and origin
- Power type: Steam
- Builder: Baldwin Locomotive Works
- Build date: 1921
- Total produced: 15
Specifications
- Configuration
  - Whyte: 4-6-2
  - UIC: 2'C1'
- Gauge: 4 ft 8 1/2 in (1,435 mm) standard gauge
- Driver dia.: 73 in (1,854 mm)
- Wheelbase: 75.80 ft (23.10 m)
  - Engine: 35.50 ft (10.82 m)
  - Drivers: 13 ft (4.0 m)
- Axle load: 60,700 lb (27,500 kg)
- Adhesive weight: 180,000 lb (82,000 kg)
- Loco weight: 297,800 lb (135,100 kg)
- Tender weight: 160,800 lb (72,900 kg)
- Total weight: 457,800 lb (207,700 kg)
- Fuel type: Oil
- Fuel capacity: 4,000 US gal (15,000 L; 3,300 imp gal)
- Water cap.: 12,000 US gal (45,000 L; 10,000 imp gal)
- Firebox
  - Grate area: 70.40 sq ft (6.540 m^{2})
- Boiler pressure: 210 psi (1.4 MPa)
- Heating surface
  - Firebox: 283 sq ft (26.3 m^{2})
- Cylinders: Two, outside
- Cylinder size: 25 in × 30 in (635 mm × 762 mm)
- Valve gear: Walschaerts
Performance figures
- Tractive effort: 46,800 lbf (208.18 kN)
- Factor of adh.: 4.15
Career
- Operators: Southern Pacific Railroad
- Class: P-8
- Numbers: 2461-2475
- Preserved: Nos. 2467 and 2472
- Disposition: Two preserved, remainder scrapped

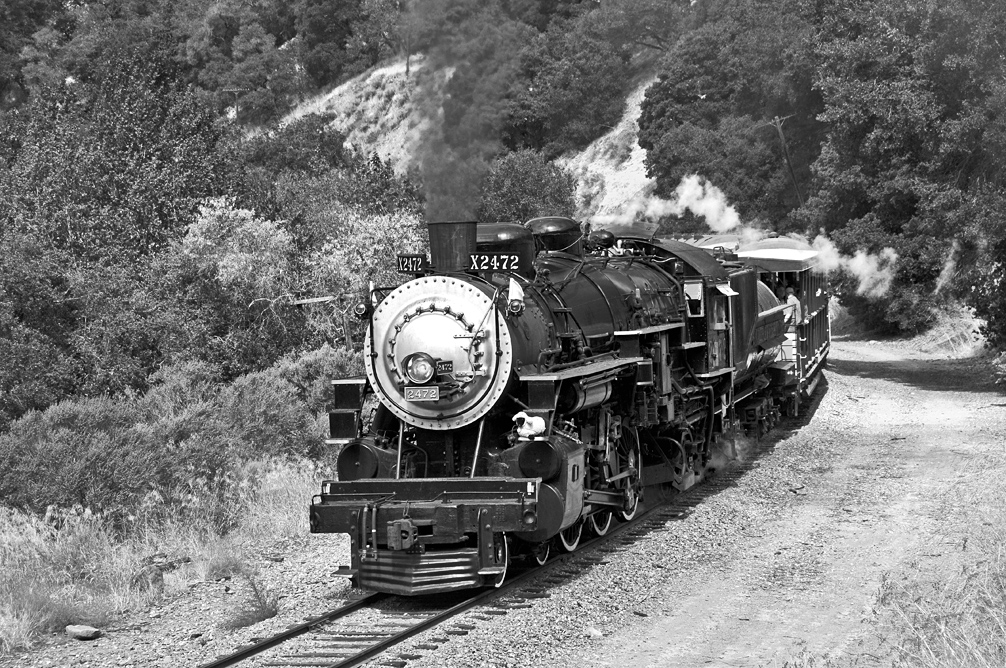

The Southern Pacific Class P-8 was a class of 4-6-2 "Pacific" type steam locomotives that were built by the Baldwin Locomotive Works (BLW) for the Southern Pacific Railroad (SP) in 1921.

== History ==
=== Introduction, construction and revenue service ===
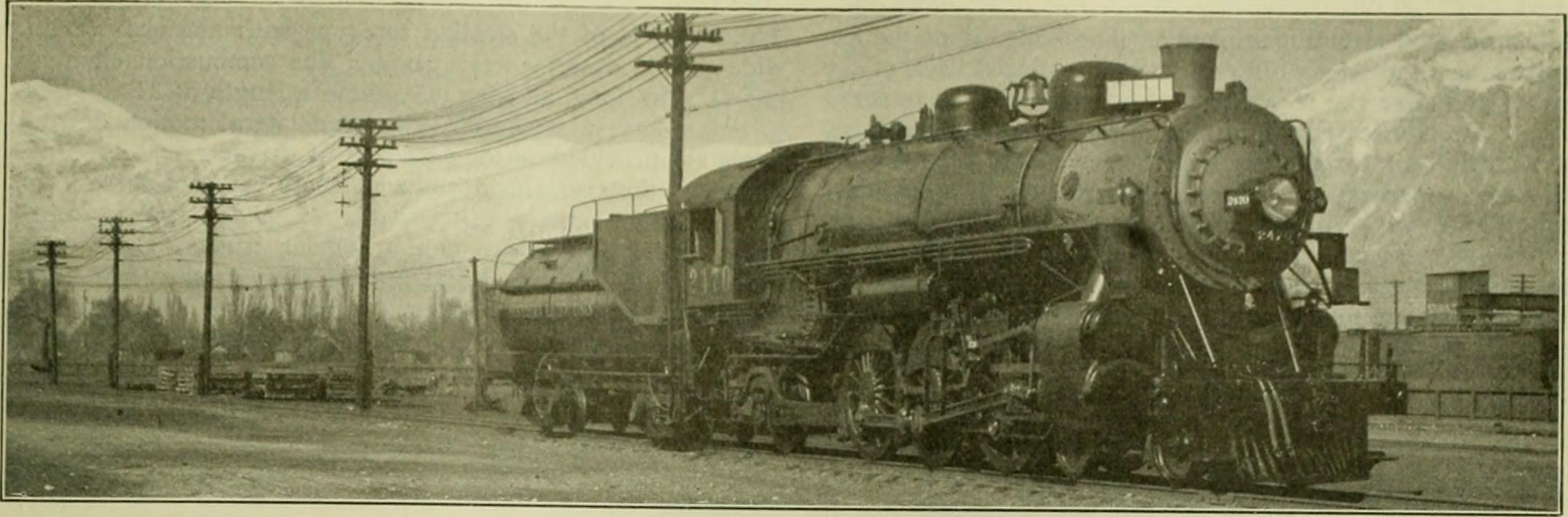
P-8 No. 2461 operating on the Southern Pacific

In all, a total of 15 locomotives of what had become the Southern Pacific Class P-8 were ever constructed by the Baldwin Locomotive Works in 1921 and they were all numbered 2461 through 2475. They were designed to be used on the Southern Pacific specifically for the Overland Route from Ogden, Utah, to Oakland, California. The P-8 locomotives had operated on the Overland Route until the larger, more powerful Mt-class of 4-8-2s were delivered in the late 1920s. Most of the P-8s were then transferred further west for service between Oakland, California and Sacramento, California, along with the demanding Peninsula Commute services between San Francisco, California and San Jose, California.

Withdrawal of the class commenced in 1957 and concluded in 1958, and all but two were scrapped.

=== Excursion star: No. 2475 ===
On January 1, 1958, No. 2475 was pulled out of storage and fired up for an excursion train over Altamont Pass, after the excursion train finished, No. 2475 was retired again on May 21, 1958, moved to West Oakland and scrapped on March 25, 1959, at San Jose, California.

== Preservation ==
Two locomotives have survived into preservation.

- 2467 had run in operational condition until August 2005 when No. 2467 was subsequently towed back to the California State Railroad Museum (CSRM) in Sacramento, California, where a long-term loan was signed to keep the locomotive in storage at the CSRM's property. As of 2022, No. 2467 is still stored serviceable while being displayed inside the CSRM's main hall with the chances of it running in operational condition being unlikely.
- 2472 was donated to San Mateo County, California, where they had put the locomotive on static display at the San Mateo County Fairgrounds, it remained there in that spot until 1976 when a group of volunteers decided to restore the locomotive to operating condition. Restoration work was completed on April 30, 1991, the locomotive had also met up with Southern Pacific GS-4 #4449, as of 2023, No. 2472 is undergoing a 1,472-day inspection and overhaul.

== See also ==
- Southern Pacific 2479 (Southern Pacific Class P-10)

== Bibliography ==
- Dunscomb, Guy L. (1963). A Century of Southern Pacific Steam Locomotives, 1862-1962. Guy L. Dunscomb.
- Luna, Henry J. (2005). Niles Canyon Railways. Arcadia. ISBN 9780738529837.
- Solomon, Brian (2013). Classic Locomotives: Steam and Diesel Power in 700 Photographs. Voyageur Press. ISBN 9781610588683.
- Solomon, Brian (2005). Southern Pacific Passenger Trains. Voyageur Press. ISBN 9781610605076.
- Solomon, Brian (2009). Steam Power. Voyageur Press. ISBN 9781616732103.
- Demoro, Harre W. (1979). Southern Pacific Bay Area Steam. Chatham Publishing Company. ISBN 978-0-89685-037-8.
- Halberstadt, Hans (2003-12-31). Working Steam: Vintage Locomotives Today. Sterling Publishing Company, Inc. ISBN 978-1-56799-776-7.
