= Southern Pacific 1215 =

Preserved SP S-10 class 0-6-0 locomotive

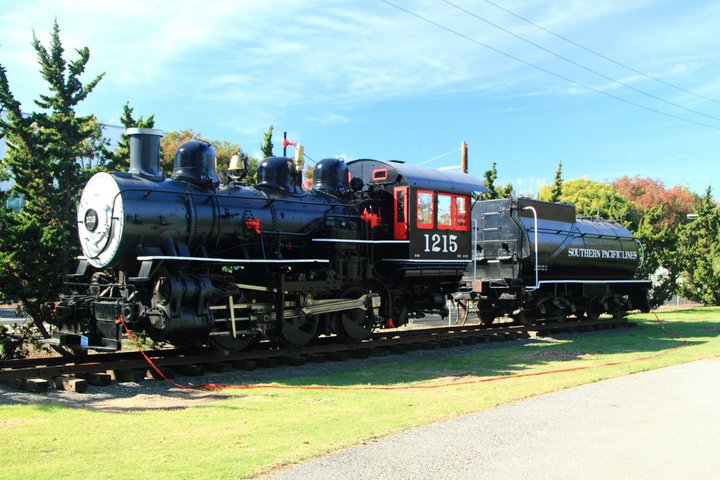
Type and origin
- Power type: Steam
- Builder: Baldwin Locomotive Works
- Serial number: 39832
- Build date: 1913
Specifications
- Configuration
  - Whyte: 0-6-0
- Gauge: 4 ft 8 1/2 in (1,435 mm)
- Driver dia.: 52 in (1,321 mm)
- Fuel type: Oil
- Cylinders: Two, outside
Career
- Operators: Southern Pacific Railroad
- Class: S-10
- Numbers: SP 1215
- Retired: July 19, 1957
- Current owner: California Trolley and Railroad Corporation
- Disposition: On static display, awaiting possible restoration

Southern Pacific 1215 is a preserved S-10 class 0-6-0 "Switcher" type steam locomotive. It was built by the Baldwin Locomotive Works (BLW) in 1913, and it was primarily used to switch rolling stock in rail yards, until it was removed from the Southern Pacific's active roster in 1957. It subsequently spent thirty-seven years on static display in Hanford, California until 1995, when it was removed from display while going through a few ownership changes. As of 2022, the locomotive is owned by the California Trolley and Railroad Corporation (CTRC), and No. 1215 is displayed in San Jose, California.

== History ==
Southern Pacific No. 1215 was built by the Baldwin Locomotive Works in 1913 as part of the Southern Pacific Railroad's (SP) S-10 class. It was originally assigned to the Dunsmuir rail yard near Mt Shasta. The locomotive was primarily used on the Western Division of the Southern Pacific Railroad, working from Oakland, Sacramento and Bakersfield. The locomotive finished its active career in San Francisco before being retired from service in 1957 and subsequently donated to Hanford, California for static display in a park in 1958. The Feather River Railroad Society (FRRS) purchased the engine in 1995 and moved it to their Portola Railroad Museum. The California Trolley and Railroad Corporation (CTRC) acquired the locomotive from FRRS in 2004. The CTRC has cosmetically restored the locomotive and it is now on display at the History Park at Kelley Park in San Jose, CA. After the Southern Pacific locomotive 2479's full restoration they'll consider a full working restoration for 1215. When the San Jose Steam Railroad Museum is completed the CTRC will display the locomotive at the museum.

== See also ==
- List of preserved Southern Pacific Railroad rolling stock
