= Santa Clara County Fairgrounds =

Event venue in San Jose, California, U.S.

Coordinates: 37°18′0″N 121°51′5″W

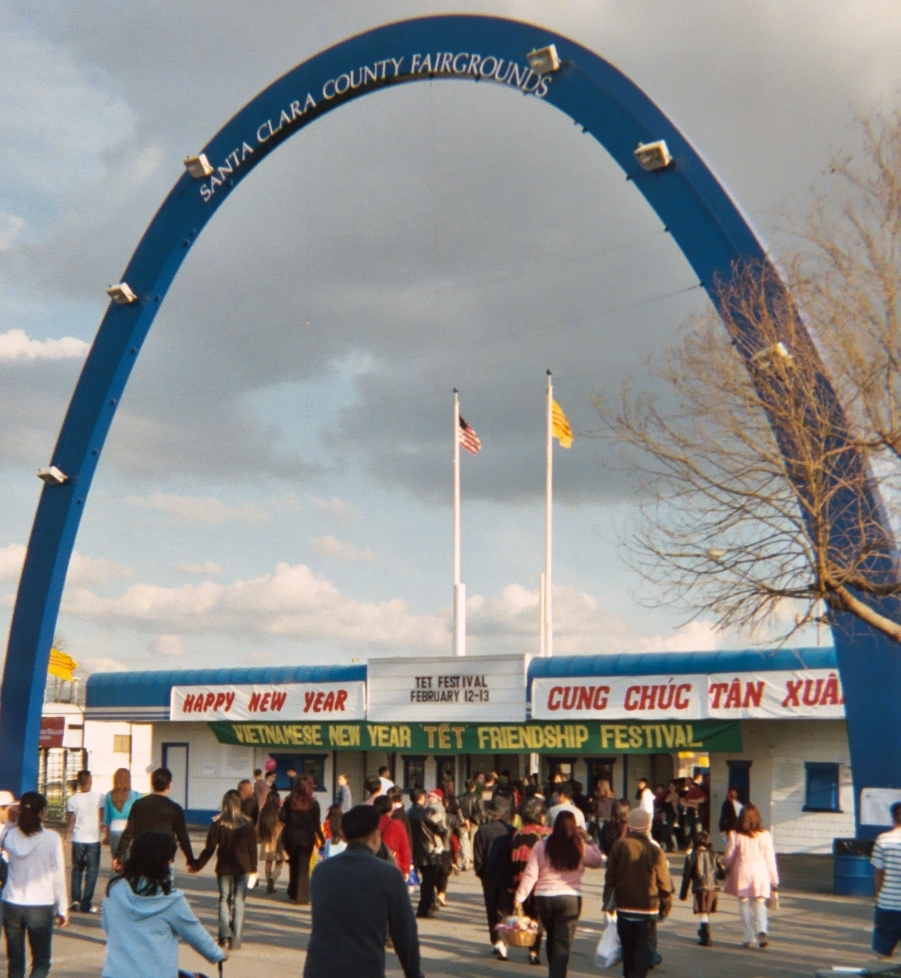
Santa Clara County Fairgrounds entrance during a Tết festival in February 2005.

The Santa Clara County Fairgrounds is an event venue in San Jose, California. The 165-acre (67 ha) fairgrounds has been owned by the County of Santa Clara since 1940 and is operated by the Santa Clara County Fairgrounds Management Corporation, a public-benefit nonprofit corporation.

Since 1941, the fairgrounds has been the site of the annual Santa Clara County Fair. At its peak in the mid-20th century, the fairgrounds hosted over 1.4 million people annually in public and private events. However, attendance declined throughout the 1990s and by 2003 had fallen to around 850,000.

== Location ==
The fairgrounds is located in the Spartan Keyes neighborhood of San Jose, California. It is bounded by Monterey Road to the west and Umbarger Road to the south. Tully Road separates the main portion of the site from a large parking lot. Oak Hill Memorial Park is located across Monterey Road from the fairgrounds.

The fairgrounds site includes 167,000 square feet (15,500 m^{2}) of indoor and covered space, 20 acres (8.1 ha) of lawn and paved outdoor space, and 40 acres (16 ha) of surface parking. Aside from the annual fair, the facilities host weddings, dog training, and off-track horse betting. There is a paintball arena as well as 16 acres (6.5 ha) of affordable housing. Housing advocates have called on the county to convert the substantial vacant parts of the site into transitional or affordable housing to ease the Bay Area's housing crisis.

== History ==
Summer fairs were held periodically at various sites in Santa Clara County since the late 1800s. On October 28, 1940, with support from the San Jose Chamber of Commerce, the county purchased the Macomber family's 97 acres (39 ha) of land along Old Tully Road for $35,000 to serve as a permanent fairgrounds. By 1941, when the first county fair was held, the fairgrounds had grown to 176 acres (71 ha) plus 14 acres (5.7 ha) of parking on the north side of Tully Road. The next county fair was not held until 1946 due to U.S. involvement in World War II.

The first concrete grandstand was built in 1950, originally for harness racing and stage performances. Horse racing was discontinued within the decade.

In 1975, a motorcycle speedway was constructed and speedway bikes raced until 1977. The track hosted important events, including a qualifying round of the Speedway World Championship in 1976.

In 1978, the San Jose Speedway (cars) relocated to a 1/4-mile-long (0.40 km) dirt oval track at the fairgrounds. It closed in 1999.

Exposition Hall and the Pavilion building were constructed in 1952 and 1960, respectively. The Gateway building and Fiesta Hall were added in the late 1960s and early 1970s. By the 1970s, the fairgrounds had become the South Bay destination for large outdoor rock concerts. However, many events relocated to Shoreline Amphitheatre in Mountain View after its construction in the 1980s.

The fairgrounds' finances deteriorated during the 1980s and 1990s, leading to the Fair Association's bankruptcy in 1994 and recreation as the Fairgrounds Management Corporation.

In 1992, the California Trolley and Railroad Corporation began planning a San Jose Steam Railroad Museum at the fairgrounds that would incorporate donated historic equipment such as Southern Pacific 2479 that had been there since the 1950s. A roundhouse was disassembled and moved to the fairgrounds for storage. However, the county board of supervisors rescinded support for the plan in 2002.

In 2017, the county put out a call for proposals to redevelop the fairgrounds. Responses included a curling center, public market, and kart racing venue.

In 2020, the Santa Clara County Public Health Department canceled all events at the fairgrounds and opened a testing and mass vaccination site there as part of its response to the COVID-19 pandemic. The site was closed on February 28, 2023.

In 2022, the county announced negotiations with Major League Cricket to build a cricket stadium on the portion of the fairgrounds north of Tully Road by 2024. The $50 million stadium would seat up to 15,000 spectators and would also be used for concerts. San Jose State University began raising funds to build a $25 million Speed City Legacy Center, including a track to replace the historic Bud Winter Field, which was demolished in 2019.

== Events ==
- Santa Clara County Fair (1941, 1946–2020)
- Silicon Valley Pride (1987–1993)
- World of Outlaws (former)
- Northern California Folk-Rock Festival (1968, 1969)
- WWNLive Mercury Rising (2015)
- La Pulgita weekly flea market held Wednesdays during the summer
- Free live music with rotating band each week held Thursday nights during summer
