= Northern California Folk-Rock Festival (1968) =

1968 music festival in San Jose, US

The Northern California Folk-Rock Festival I
- Genre: Rock, pop, etc.
- Dates: May 18–19, 1968
- Locations: Santa Clara County Fairgrounds, San Jose, California
- Years active: 1968, 1969
- Founders: Bob Blodgett

The Northern California Folk-Rock Festival was a music festival held at Family Park in the Santa Clara County Fairgrounds, 344 Tully Road, San Jose, California, on May 18–19, 1968 and promoted by Bob Blodgett. It was the first of two such festivals held at the venue, being followed by the Northern California Folk-Rock Festival (1969).

The festival featured Country Joe and the Fish, The Animals, Jefferson Airplane, The Doors, Big Brother and the Holding Company feat. Janis Joplin, The Youngbloods, The Electric Flag, Kaleidoscope, Taj Mahal, and Ravi Shankar. And although not mentioned in the promotional material, the Grateful Dead also performed.

Linda Segul created a poster. Carson-Morris Studios also created a poster featuring Jim Morrison.

== See also ==
- List of historic rock festivals
- List of music festivals in the United States
