= Spartan Keyes, San Jose =

Neighborhood of San Jose in Santa Clara, California, United States

Spartan Keyes
- Neighborhood of San Jose
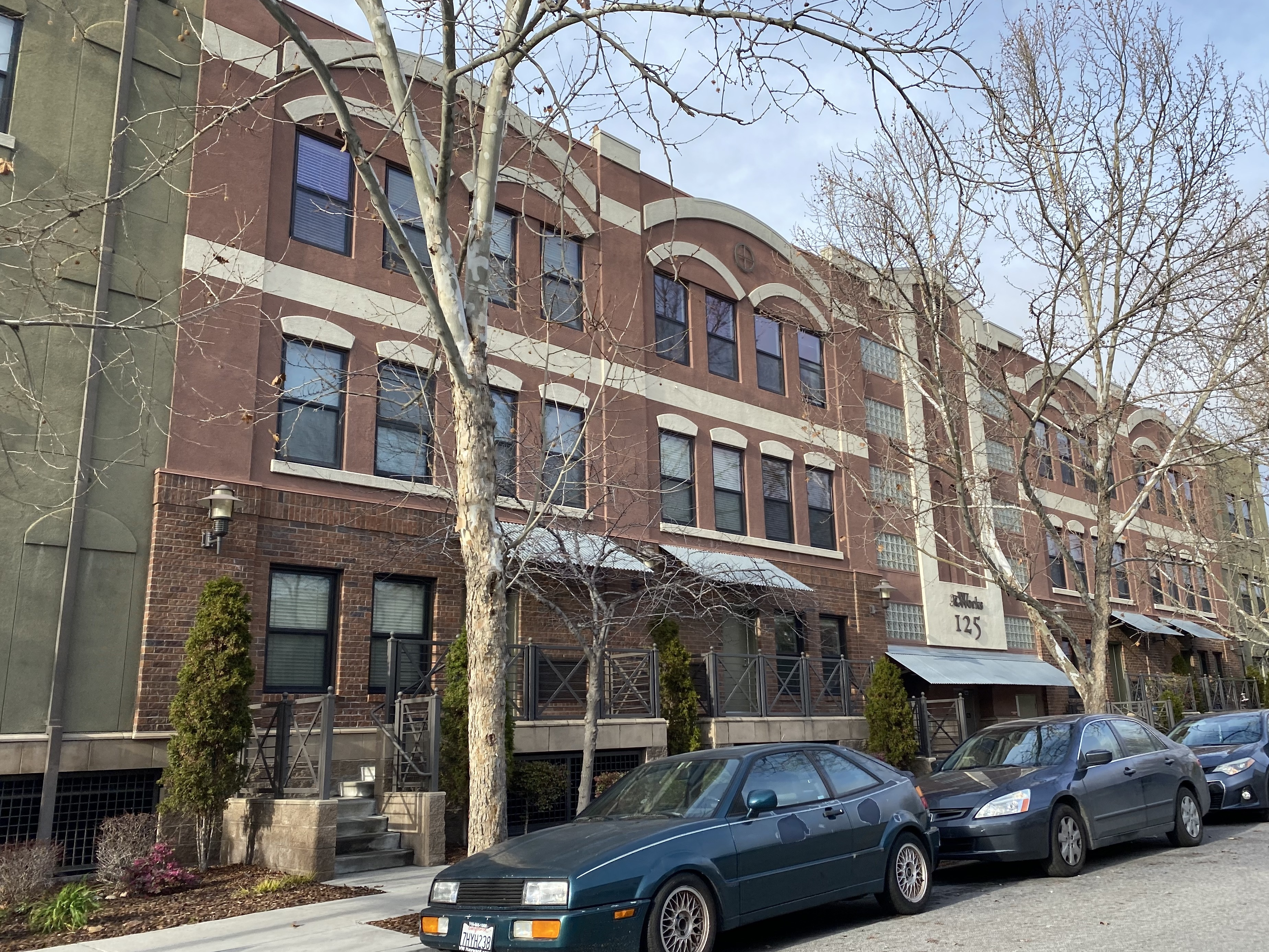
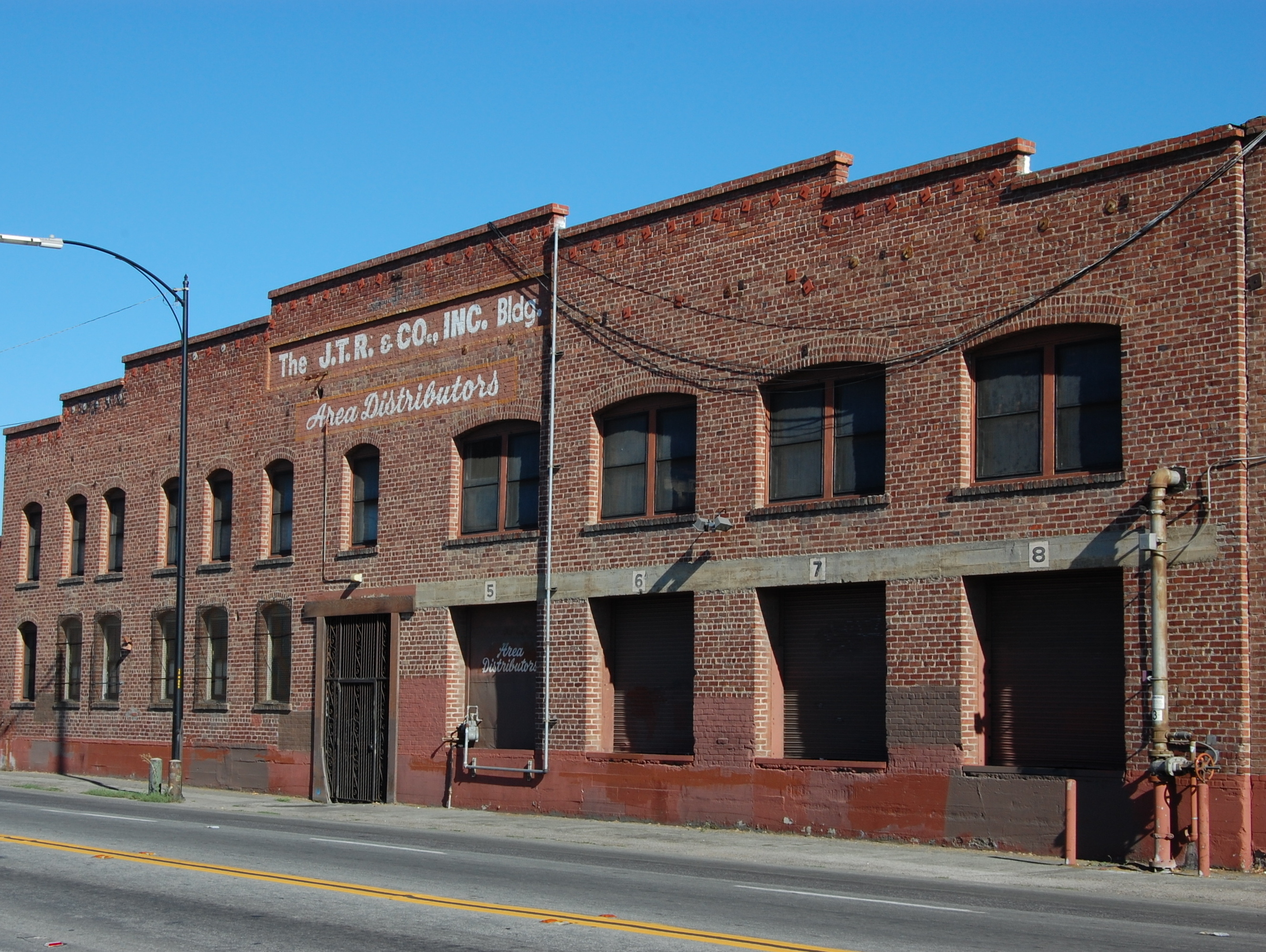
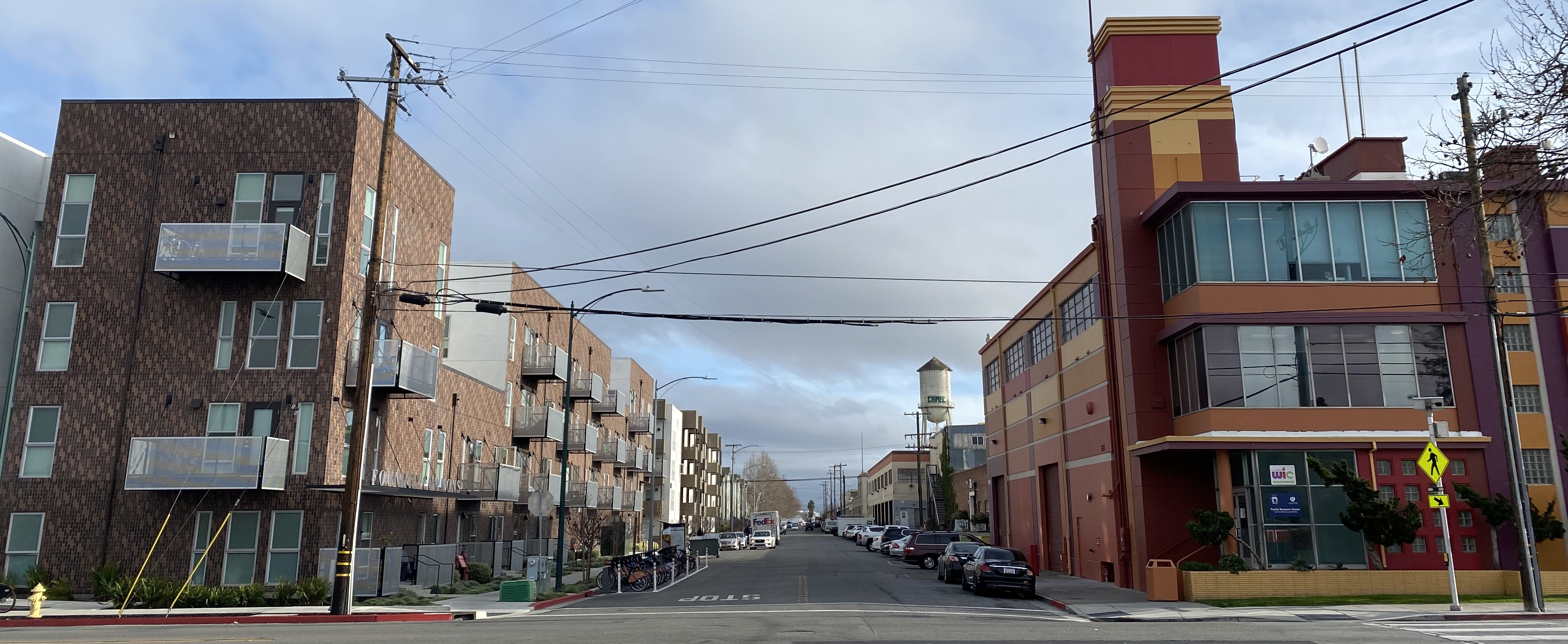
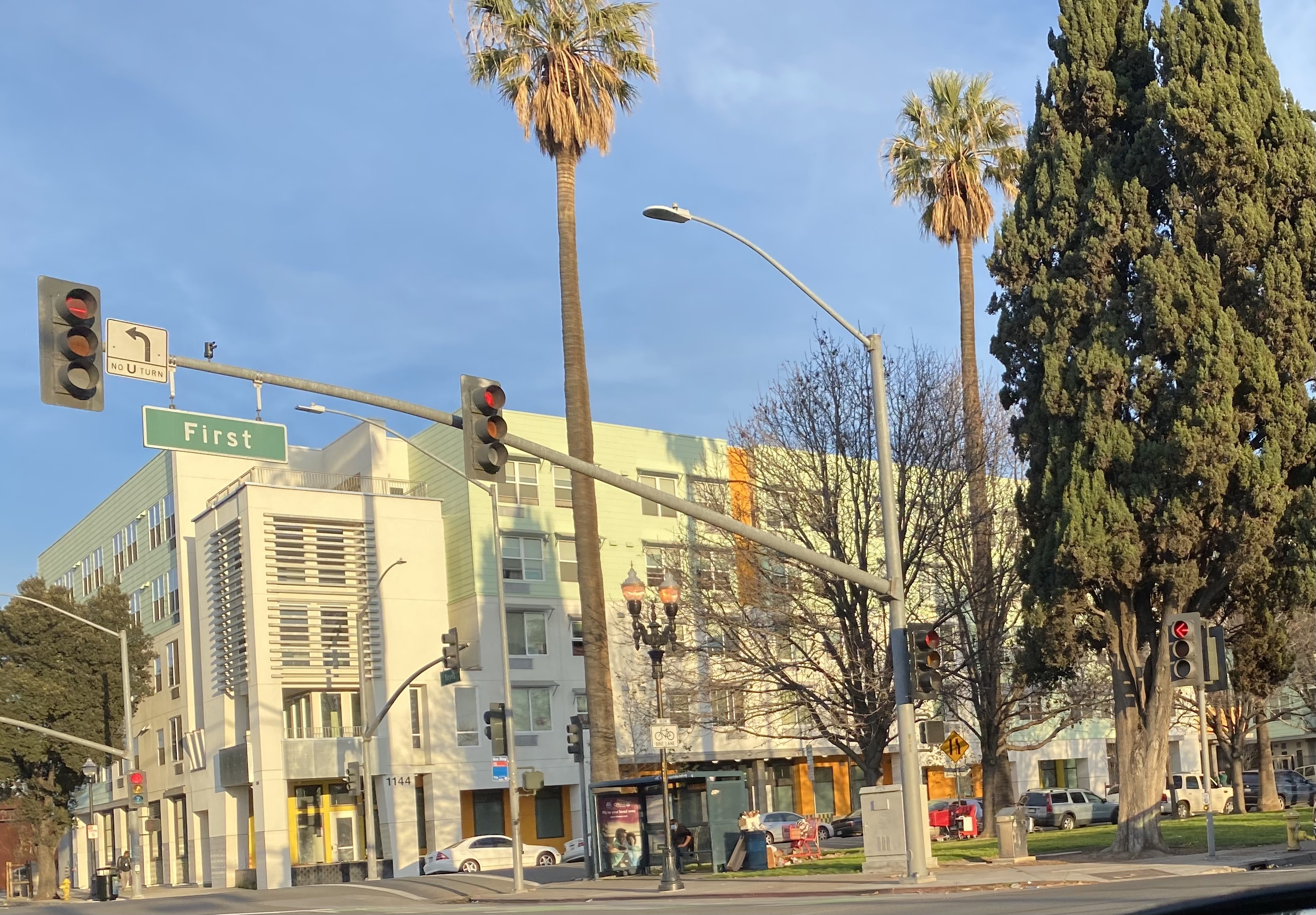
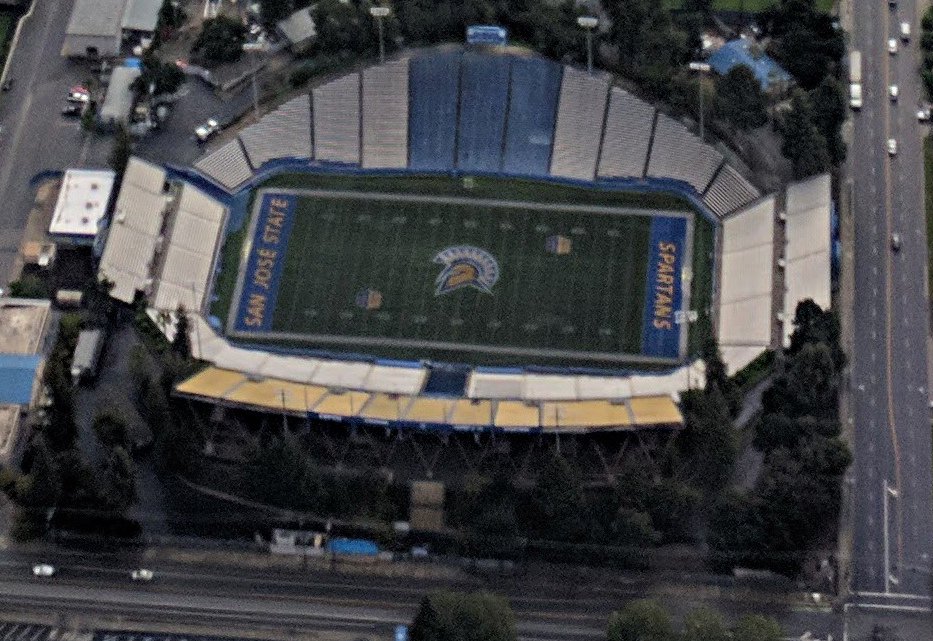
- Top Old Home of Benevolence, historic JTR Distributors; middle: 5th St at Virginia St; Bottom: Second St. Studios; CEFCU Stadium.

- Location within San Jose
- Coordinates: 37.321526°N 121.875008°W
- Country: United States
- State: California
- County: Santa Clara
- City: San Jose

Population (2016)
  - Total: 31,895

Spartan Keyes is a neighborhood of central San Jose, California, located just south of Downtown San Jose. Spartan Keyes is home to a notable community of artists, art studios, and galleries. The neighborhood is home to the south campus of San Jose State University and is one of central San Jose's historic neighborhoods, made up of late 19th and early 20th century architecture.

== History ==
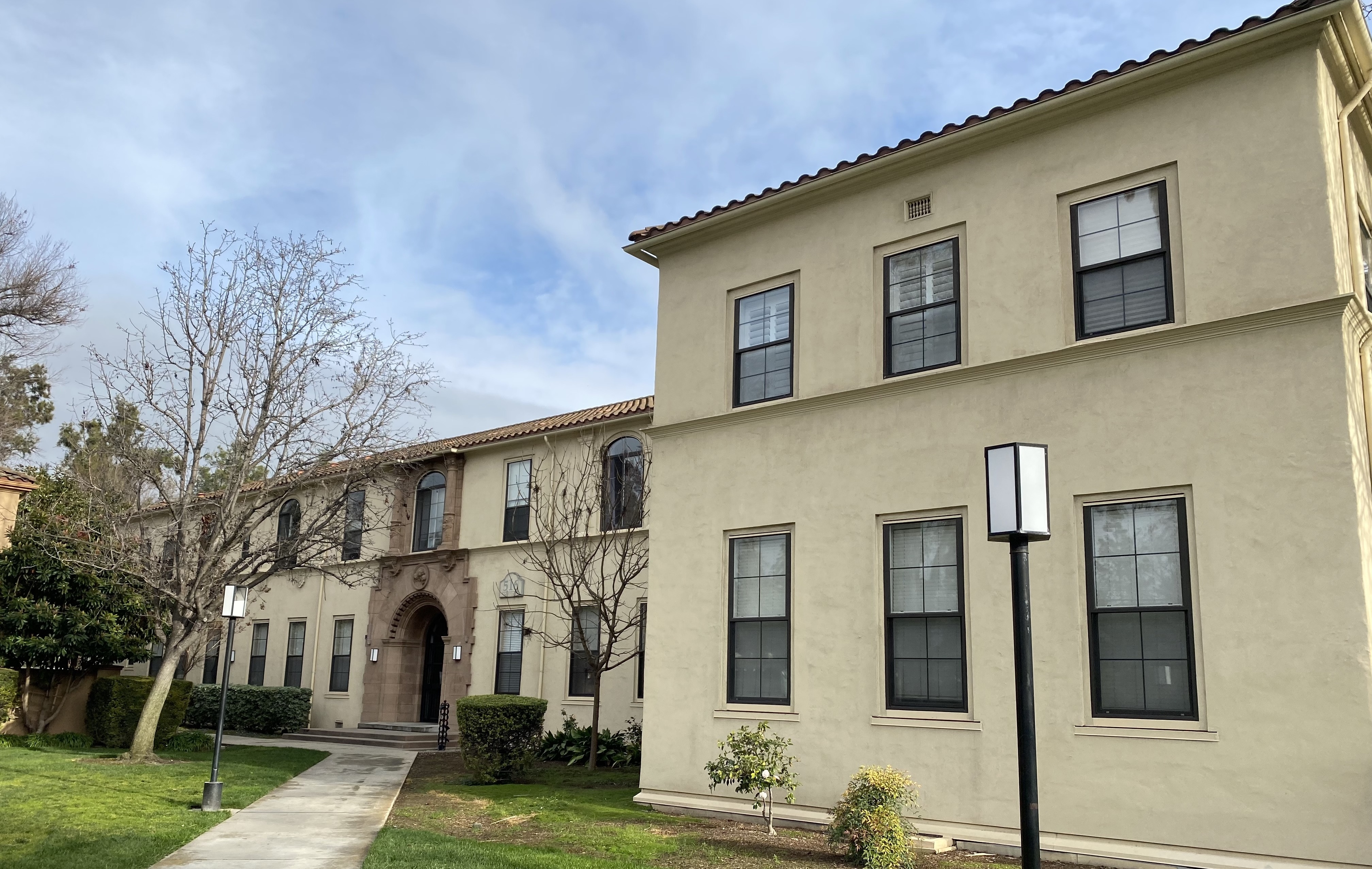
Old Home of Benevolence, built in 1924 in a Spanish Renaissance style.

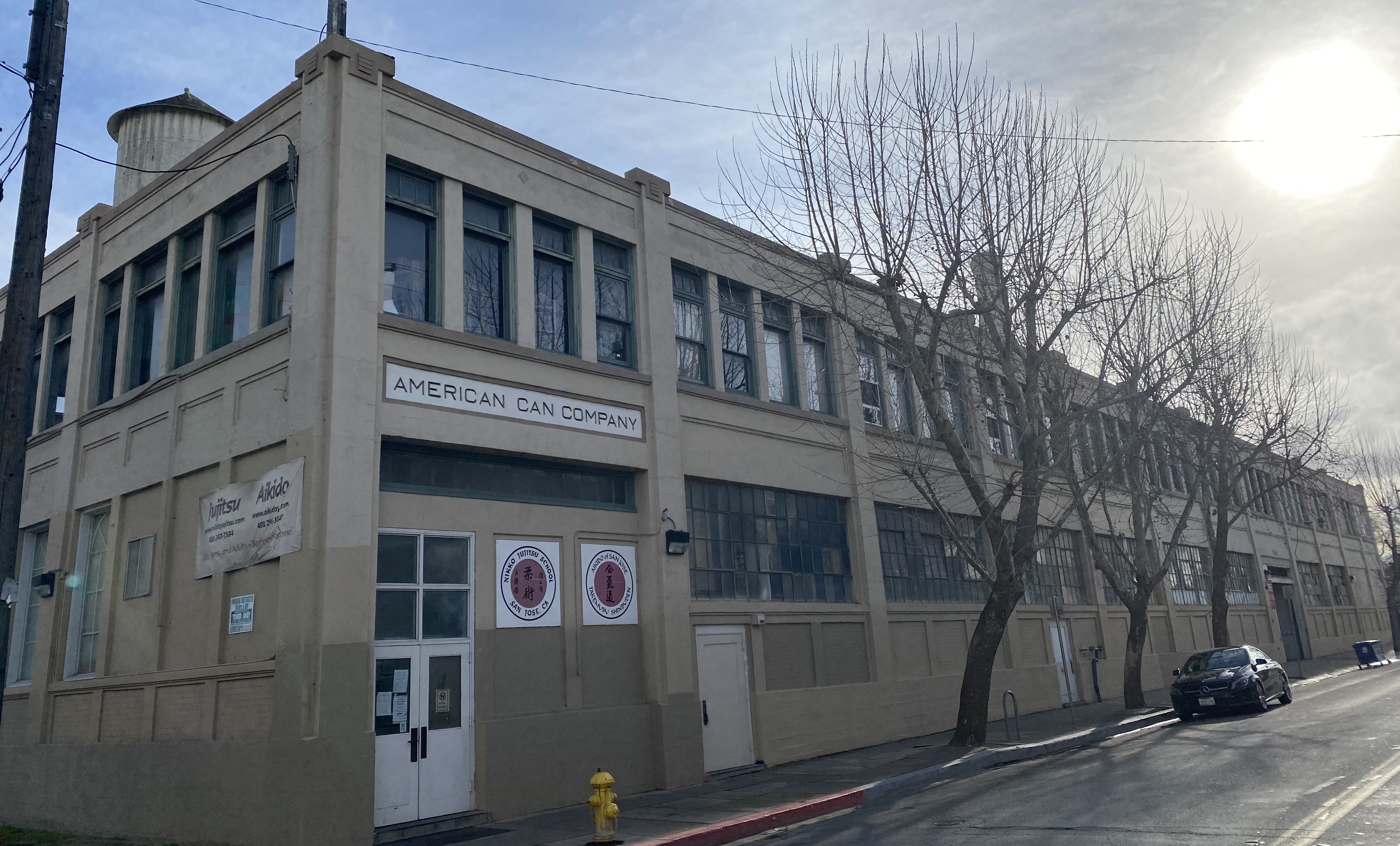
Old American Can Company factory houses art studios today.

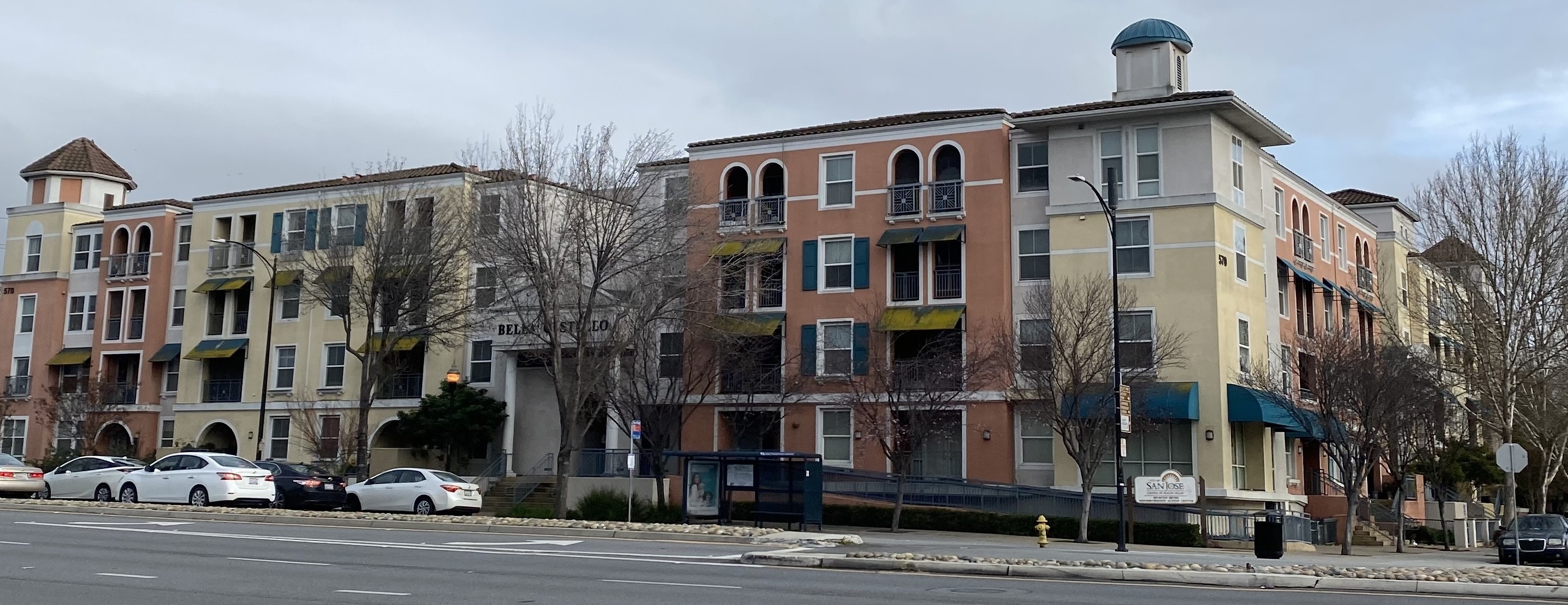
Spartan Keyes Neighborhood Action Center.

The neighborhood is made up of late 19th and early 20th century residences, former canneries and warehouses, and other noteworthy historic structures. The neighborhood is predominantly Chicano/Mexican-American.

Rail tracks were laid through the district in the late 1860s and the area came to house numerous canneries and processing companies supporting the Santa Clara Valley's burgeoning agricultural industry at the time. Local landmarks including the former American Can Company factory and the JTR Distributors warehouses were built to support these industries.

The Old Home of Benevolence, at the corner of 11th and Martha, was built by the Ladies' Benevolent Society in a Spanish Colonial Revival architecture in 1924.

== Geography ==
Spartan Keyes is located south of Downtown San Jose and east of Washington-Guadalupe. The neighborhood's eastern border is made up of Coyote Creek and Kelley Park.

== Arts ==
The area is notably home to a community of artists, art studios, and galleries. Many former warehouses and factories have been converted into art studios and galleries, such as Citadel Art Studios and Art Ark. The San José State University Foundry and its art program are also located in the area.

== Landmarks ==
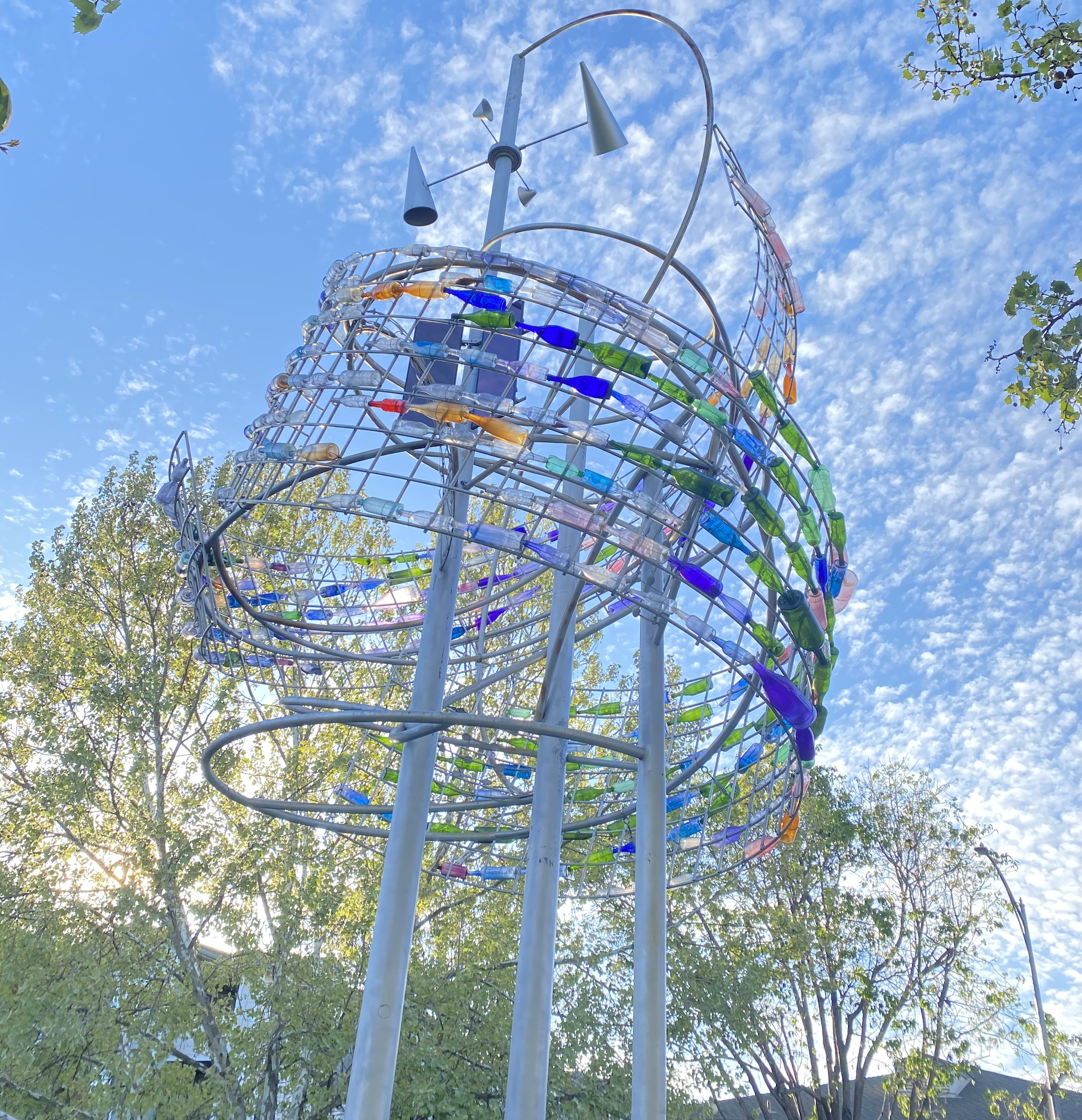
Bestor Art Park.

- CEFCU Stadium, home of the San José State Spartans
- Bestor Art Park
- Old Home of Benevolence
- Old American Can Company Factory
- Santa Clara County Fairgrounds
