= Southern Pacific 2472 =

Preserved SP P-8 class 4-6-2 locomotive

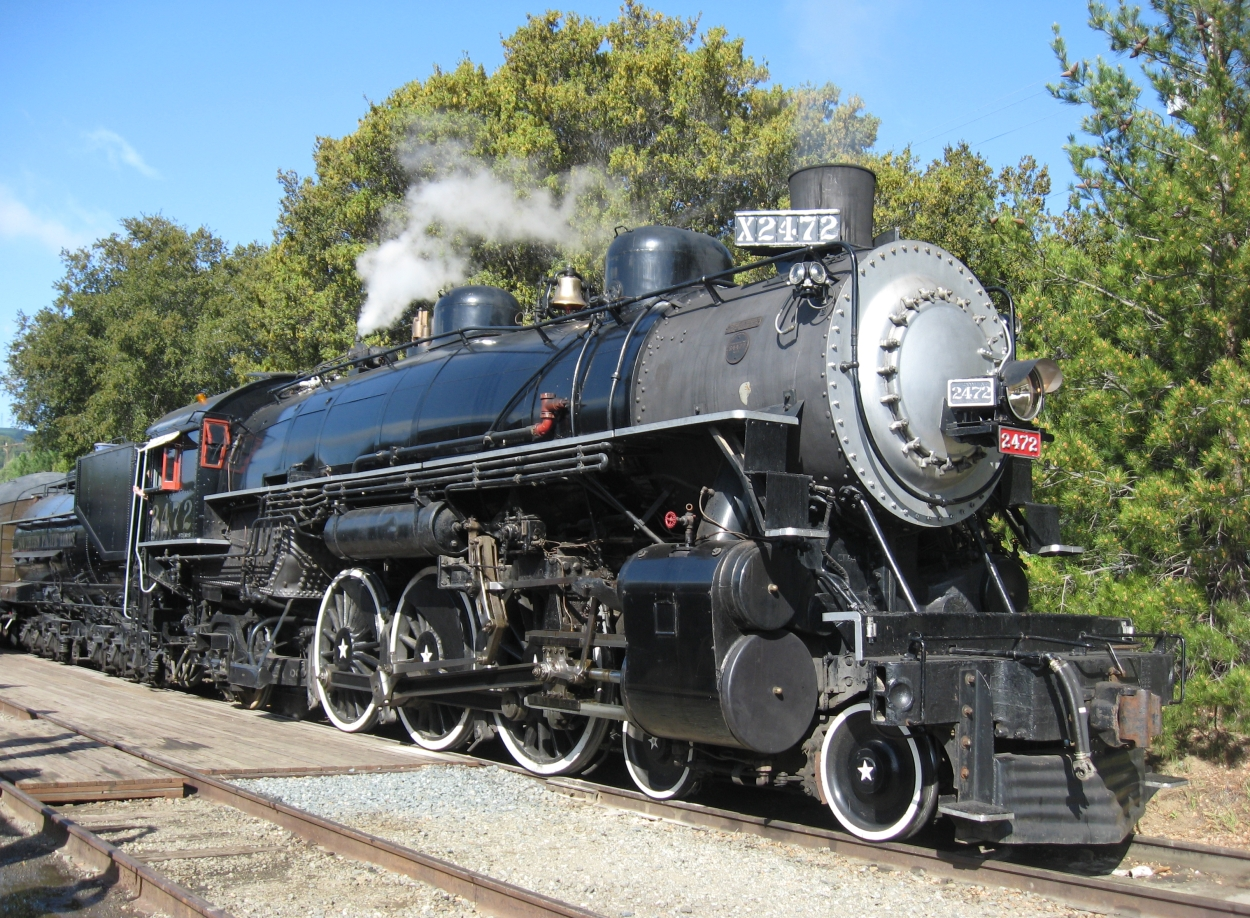
- SP No. 2472 at the Niles Canyon Railway
Type and origin
- Power type: Steam
- Builder: Baldwin Locomotive Works
- Serial number: 54477
- Build date: March 1921
- Rebuild date: November 29, 1940
Specifications
- Configuration
  - Whyte: 4-6-2
  - UIC: 2'C1'
- Gauge: 4 ft 8 1/2 in (1,435 mm) standard gauge
- Driver dia.: 73 in (1,854 mm)
- Wheelbase: 75.80 ft (23.10 m)
  - Engine: 35.50 ft (10.82 m)
  - Drivers: 13 ft (4.0 m)
- Axle load: 60,700 lb (27,500 kg)
- Adhesive weight: 180,000 lb (82,000 kg)
- Loco weight: 297,800 lb (135,100 kg)
- Tender weight: 160,800 lb (72,900 kg)
- Total weight: 457,800 lb (207,700 kg)
- Fuel type: Oil
- Fuel capacity: 4,000 US gal (15,000 L; 3,300 imp gal)
- Water cap.: 12,000 US gal (45,000 L; 10,000 imp gal)
- Firebox
  - Grate area: 70.40 sq ft (6.540 m^{2})
- Boiler pressure: 210 psi (1.4 MPa)
- Heating surface
  - Firebox: 283 sq ft (26.3 m^{2})
- Cylinder size: 25 in × 30 in (635 mm × 762 mm)
- Valve gear: Walschaerts
- Valve type: Piston valves
- Loco brake: Air
- Train brakes: Air
- Couplers: Knuckle
Performance figures
- Tractive effort: 46,800 lbf (208.18 kN)
- Factor of adh.: 4.15
Career
- Operators: Southern Pacific Railroad; Golden Gate Railroad Museum
- Class: P-8
- Number in class: 15
- Numbers: SP 2472
- Delivered: April 15, 1921
- Last run: January 1957
- Retired: February 7, 1957
- Preserved: April 10, 1959
- Restored: April 30, 1991
- Current owner: Golden Gate Railroad Museum
- Disposition: Undergoing 1,472-day inspection and overhaul

Southern Pacific 2472 is a P-8 class 4-6-2 "Pacific" type steam locomotive built in March 1921 by the Baldwin Locomotive Works (BLW) for the Southern Pacific Railroad (SP). It is among three surviving P-8 class, the others are Nos. 2467 and 2479. The locomotive was used to haul passenger trains until it was retired in 1957, and was then donated to be placed on static display at the San Mateo County Fairgrounds. After being restored to operational condition in the early 1990s, the locomotive pulled excursion trains on the Niles Canyon Railway until 2015. It was then moved to the Northwestern Pacific Railroad, where, as of 2023, is undergoing its Federal Railroad Administration (FRA) mandated 1,472 day inspection and overhaul.

== History ==
=== Revenue service ===
No. 2472 was built by the Baldwin Locomotive Works (BLW) for the Southern Pacific Railroad (SP) in March 1921. No. 2472 and the other "Pacific" locomotives served the Overland Route from Ogden, Utah, to Oakland, California. On November 30, 1929, SP's Ogden shops added a feedwater heater to the locomotive, which increased its overall weight to 300,000 lb (140,000 kg). No. 2472 again underwent a rebuild at SP's Bayshore shops in Brisbane, California (San Mateo County), completed on November 26, 1940, which increased its boiler pressure to 210 psi (1,400 kPa) and its tractive effort to 45,850 pounds-force (204.0 kN).

No. 2472 made its last run for the Southern Pacific in January 1957. After being replaced by the 4-8-2 "Mountain" type locomotives, No. 2472 and all other Pacific locomotives were sent to work Sacramento-Oakland passenger trains and San Francisco-San Jose commute trains, along with occasional freight service. No. 2472 was retired from regular revenue service on February 7, 1957, during Southern Pacific's dieselization, and on April 10, 1959, No. 2472 was donated to San Mateo County, which put the locomotive on static display at the San Mateo County Fairgrounds; it remained there until 1976 when a group of volunteers decided to restore the locomotive. This group would later become the Golden Gate Railroad Museum.

=== Excursion service ===
Restoration work was completed on April 30, 1991 just in time to participate in Railfair 91, which took place in Sacramento on May 1, 1991, it featured other famous steam locomotives, such as Southern Pacific GS-4 4-8-4 "Northern" 4449, Union Pacific FEF-3 4-8-4 844, Union Pacific 4-6-6-4 "Challenger" 3985, Union Pacific 0-6-0 4466, and British Great Northern Railway J13 0-6-0 tank locomotive 1247. In the 1990s and early 2000s, No. 2472 pulled several excursions and Caltrain specials such as the "Toys for Tots", and double-headed on an excursion in 1992 (during the NRHS Convention) with the No. 4449. In September 1992, the No. 2472 had the honour of pulling the Pacific Limited excursion special, and "The Earth Train". Also in the early 1990s, the locomotive made a special appearance in “California’s Gold with Huell Howser” television program in two different episodes, Trains (209) and San Luis Obispo Train (507).

No. 2472 received Federal Railroad Administration-mandated boiler work at Hunters Point Naval Base in San Francisco, during 2005–06 when the Golden Gate Railroad Museum (GGRM) was located there. The GGRM and all other tenants at Hunter's Point had to leave the former navy base in 2006 due to redevelopment. The initial equipment move took place in February 2006, although an extended lease on the shop building allowed work to continue on No. 2472 for ten more months. On December 31, 2006, No. 2472 and the remaining pieces of GGRM rolling stock completed relocation to the Niles Canyon Railway (NICX), located in Sunol, California, on the east side of San Francisco Bay.

The locomotive became serviceable in February 2008, and was stored in Niles Canyon at the Brightside Yard between operations. No. 2472 has operated in Niles Canyon, usually on Memorial Day weekends and Labor Day weekends, and on other dates as announced.

In 2017, the Golden Gate Railroad Museum announced that they will be leaving Niles Canyon and No. 2472 would pull the last excursions in Niles Canyon on the 2015 Labor Day weekend. The relocation move of No. 2472 to the Northwestern Pacific Railroad in Schellville, California started on March 1, 2020 when the P-8 Pacific-type steam locomotive, along with two former Southern Pacific Railroad diesel locomotives (both in operating condition) that belong to GGRM, were towed by two Union Pacific locomotives towards Schellville. On October 9, 2021, No. 2472 was fired up for the first time since 2015. It was scheduled to make its excursion return hauling Labor Day Weekend 2022 trains from September 4 through September 5, 2022 before its Federal Railroad Administration (FRA) 1,472-day inspection and overhaul begins, but the event was later canceled by SMART and the railroad had the engine fired up for an open house event instead. As of 2025, No. 2472 is undergoing its FRA mandated 1,472-day inspection and overhaul.

== See also ==
- Southern Pacific 1744
- Southern Pacific 2353
- Southern Pacific 745
- Southern Pacific 786
