= Northern California Folk-Rock Festival (1969) =

The Northern California Folk-Rock Festival II
- Genre: Rock, pop, etc.
- Dates: May 23–25, 1969
- Locations: San Jose, California; United States
- Years active: 1968, 1969
- Founders: Bob Blodgett

The Northern California Folk-Rock Festival was a music festival held at Santa Clara County Fairgrounds in San Jose, California on May 23–25, 1969 and promoted by Bob Blodgett. It was the second such festival held at the venue, following the Northern California Folk-Rock Festival (1968).

The festival featured The Jimi Hendrix Experience, Jefferson Airplane, The Chambers Brothers, Spirit, Canned Heat, Buffy Sainte-Marie, The Youngbloods, Steve Miller, Chuck Berry, Taj Mahal, Noel Redding, Lee Michaels, Blues Image, Santana, Aum, Elvin Bishop, Poco, People!, Linn County, The Loading Zone, Sweet Linda Divine, Cat Mother, Doc Watson & New Lost City Ramblers, Sable.

Linda Segul created the 14" x 20 1/2" poster.

"radio station KSJO was warning listeners that the acts advertised on the poster for 1969 festival — particularly Led Zeppelin and Jimi Hendrix — were not going to appear, as they were booked elsewhere at the time. (This situation resulted in a lawsuit — paid for by Zeppelin — against the promoter, who retaliated by paying Hendrix $30,000, an unheard of amount at the time, to fly in by Lear Jet and play for half an hour.)"

== See also ==
- List of historic rock festivals
- List of pop festivals
- List of music festivals in the United States
