= Golden Gate Railroad Museum =

Museum in California, United States

Coordinates: 37.59782°N 121.91773°W

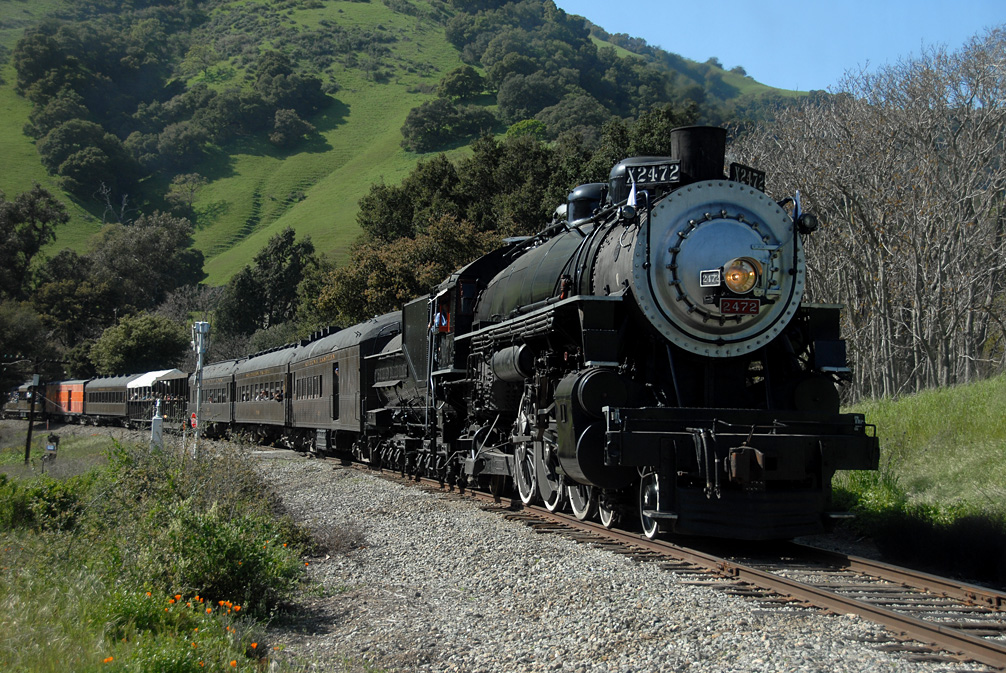
- No. 2472 hauling an excursion train in March 2009

Overview
- Headquarters: Schellville, California
- Reporting mark: GGMX
- Locale: Schellville, California
- Dates of operation: 1972–present

Technical
- Track gauge: 4 ft 8 1/2 in (1,435 mm) standard gauge

Other
- Website: http://ggrm.org/

The Golden Gate Railroad Museum (reporting mark GGMX) is a non-profit railroad museum in California that is dedicated to the preservation of steam and passenger railroad equipment, as well as the interpretation of local railroad history.

== History ==
The Golden Gate Railroad Museum (GGRM) traces its origins to 1972, when Mike Mangini first spotted ex-SP 2472, a steam locomotive that had been on static display in the San Mateo County Fairgrounds parking lot since 1959. In 1975, Mangini was granted permission to take the locomotive away, and weekend volunteers began restoring 2472 on weekends, shortly thereafter incorporating as Project 2472. After the boiler was restored, the locomotive was moved in 1990 to San Francisco at the Hunters Point Shipyard. On April 30, 1991, 2472 moved under its own power to Santa Clara and then either San Jose or Sacramento for display at Railfair '91.

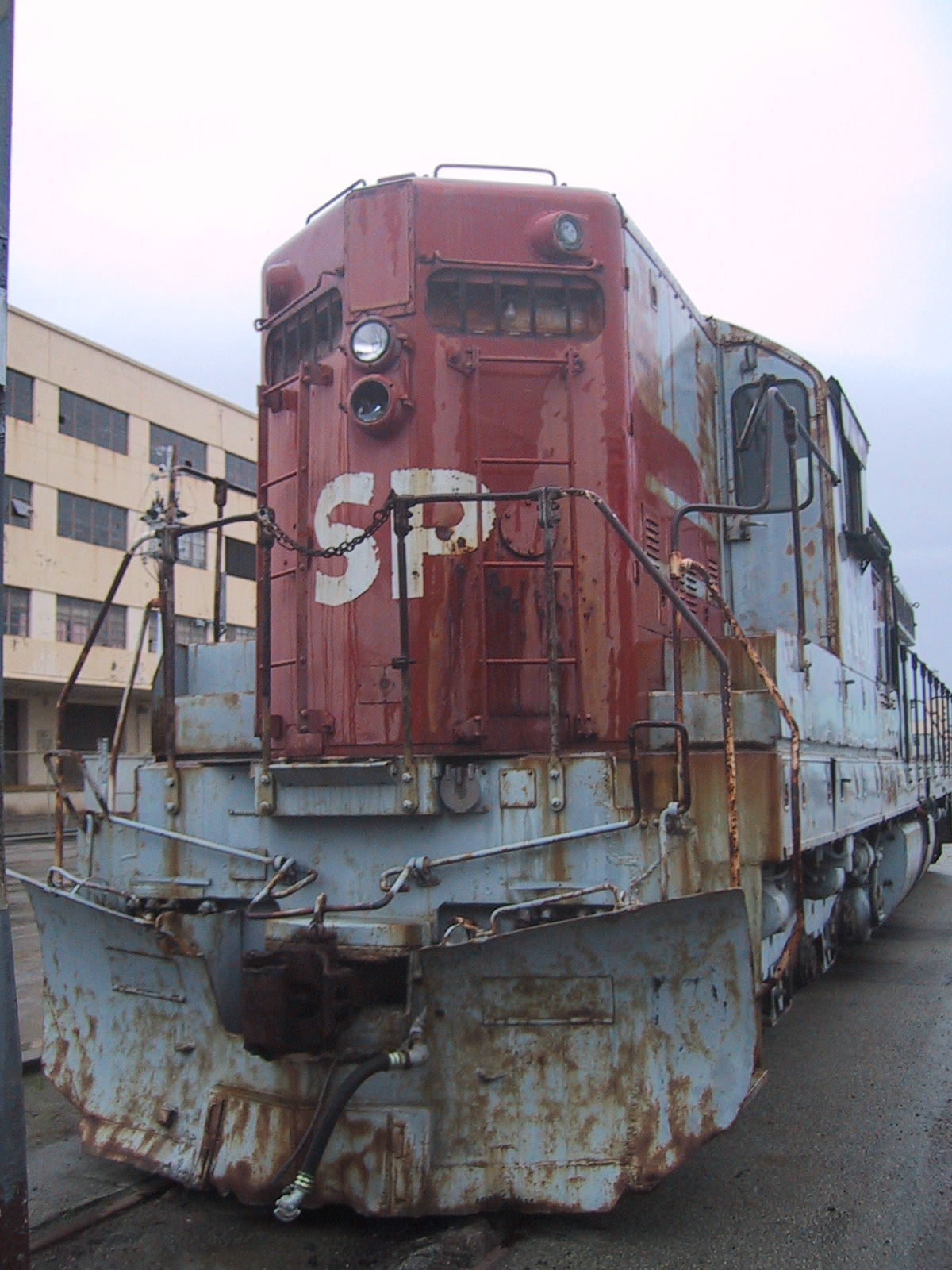
SP 4450 "Huff" at GGRM in Hunters Point; subsequently sold to WPRM in 2006, scrapped in 2013.

The museum was initially located in Hunters Point until the Navy notified GGRM in August 2005 that all leases would be cancelled and the area would need to be vacated by February 2006, as it was turning the site over to the city. The museum moved its collection of 12 locomotives and over 25 pieces of rolling stock to Sunol, home of the Niles Canyon Railway operated by the Pacific Locomotive Association (PLA); some of the collection was sold or donated to other historical rail sites, including the Western Pacific Railroad Museum (WPRM), operated by the Feather River Rail Society (FRRS). FRRS and PLA participated in the GGRM's big move, with FRRS loaning road-worthy engines and crews to facilitate the move. In exchange, GGRM donated several locomotives and cars to WPRM.

In January 2017, GGRM announced it would be moving to Schellville, on the Northwestern Pacific Railroad. The GGRM's new Schellville yard, near Victory Station, was fenced in late 2018, and the move to Schellville commenced in March 2020. Preparations to move the fleet included replacing obsolete brake valves on passenger cars, fixing air leaks, and replacing wheel sets.

The offices of GGRM are in Redwood City. The museum performs restoration work on its collection, which it showcases for special events and excursion trains.

== Collection ==
=== Current equipment ===
Fleet No.	Image	Mfr.	Model	Wheel arr.	Built	Status	Notes	Refs.
Locomotives
2472		Baldwin	P-8	4-6-2	March 1921	Undergoing 1,472-day inspection and overhaul	Retired in 1957 and on static display at the San Mateo County Fairgrounds from 1959 until 1976.	
3194		EMD	GP9	B-B	May 1954	Operational	Built as T&NO 281, renumbered to SP 5895 in 1961, then 3001 in 1965, and finally 3194 in 1977. Worked Peninsula Commute from 1960/61 to 1985. Retired in 1993 and donated to GGRM.	
1487		FM	H-12-44	B-B	January 1953	Operational	Formerly U.S. Army No. 1847; acquired in March 1995 and repainted in "Tiger Stripe" livery as replica of yard switcher SP 1487.	
6378 & 6380		EMD	F7A	B-B	July 1952	Awaiting restoration	Traded to General Electric in the late 1960s; resold and served on short lines WAG as 2100 and 2000, then to L&NW as 46 and 45 in 1969.	
GGRM 9		GE	65-ton	B-B	1943	Operational	Originally built for U.S. Navy in 1943; used for shop switching duties at GGRM and formerly numbered as 3 when collection was at Hunters Point.	
Passenger cars and head-end equipment
141		Pullman	Business Car	—N/a	1927	Operational	Assigned to A.D. MacDonald, President of SP, in 1932; acquired in 2002.	
293		Pullman	Chair Car	—N/a	1954	?	Originally numbered 2356 for Coast Daylight service; renumbered in 1974.	
2097, 2143, 2156		Pullman	"Suburban"	—N/a	1923, 1927	?	Used in Peninsula Commute service until 1985.	
2979		Pullman	Club-Lounge	—N/a	1912	Operational	Converted to 54-seat club-lounge in 1940; acquired in 1989 and restored to 1954 appearance.	
3714, 3720 & 3722		AC&F	Gallery Car	—N/a	1956	?	Used in Peninsula Commute service until 1985. Acquired in 2018.	
UP 5901		Pullman	Railway post office	—N/a	1949	Operational	Served on City of San Francisco service between Oakland and Chicago.	

=== Former equipment ===
Fleet No.	Image	Mfr.	Model	Wheel arr.	Built	Status	Notes	Refs.
Locomotives
4450		EMD	SD9	C-C	April 1954	Scrapped	Subsequently sold to WPRM in 2006, scrapped in 2013.	

== In popular culture ==
In the 2003 season of the television show MythBusters, the episode "Peeing on the Third Rail" was filmed at the original location in Hunters Point.

== See also ==
- List of heritage railroads in the United States
- List of museums in California
