= Santa Fe 5 =

Preserved American 0-4-0 locomotive

Atchison, Topeka & Santa Fe #5 Little Buttercup
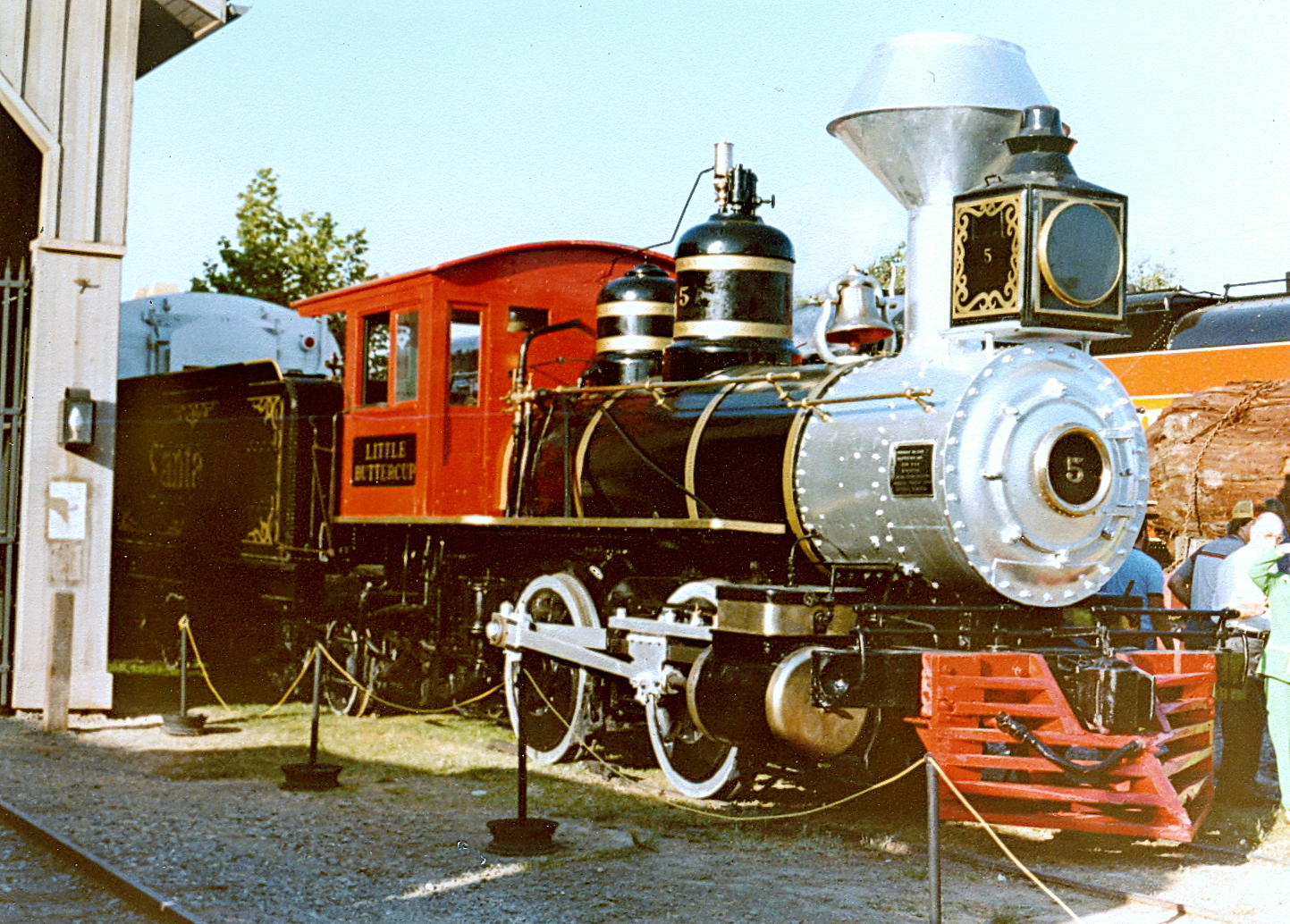
Type and origin
- Power type: Steam
- Builder: Baldwin Locomotive Works
- Model: 04-28 C 32
- Build date: 1899
Specifications
- Configuration
  - Whyte: 0-4-0
- Gauge: 4 ft 8 1/2 in (1,435 mm)
- Driver dia.: 51 in (1.295 m)
- Fuel type: Oil
- Boiler pressure: 160 lbf/in^{2} (1.10 MPa)
- Cylinders: Two, outside
- Cylinder size: 25 in × 30 in (635 mm × 762 mm)
- Valve gear: Stephenson
- Valve type: Piston valves
- Loco brake: Air
- Train brakes: Air
- Couplers: Knuckle
Performance figures
- Tractive effort: 16,965 lbf (75.46 kN)
Career
- Operators: Santa Fe Terminal Railway, Atchison, Topeka and Santa Fe Railway
- Numbers: SFT 1; 2419; 02419 (1945); 9419 (Late 1945 to 1948); 5 (1948 on)
- Retired: 1951
- Current owner: California State Railroad Museum, on long-term loan to the California Trolley and Railroad Corporation
- Disposition: On display at the Kelley Park Trolley Barn

Atchison, Topeka & Santa Fe No. 5 Little Buttercup (former ATSF #2419, Santa Fe Terminal #1) is an 0-4-0 steam locomotive.

== History ==
"Little Buttercup" was originally built in 1899 by the Baldwin Locomotive Works as an 0-4-0 saddle tank locomotive for the Santa Fe Terminal Railway as their #1. The SFT was a subsidiary of the Atchison, Topeka & Santa Fe Railway, operating under the moniker of the San Francisco & San Joaquin Valley Railway, was designed to run a terminal operation in the China Basin around San Francisco, California. It was absorbed into the ATSF system in 1902, and SFT #1 became ATSF #2419. She was then moved to the shops at Needles, California to work there as the "shop goat," and was renumbered at least 3 more times till finally running with the road number #9419 in 1948.

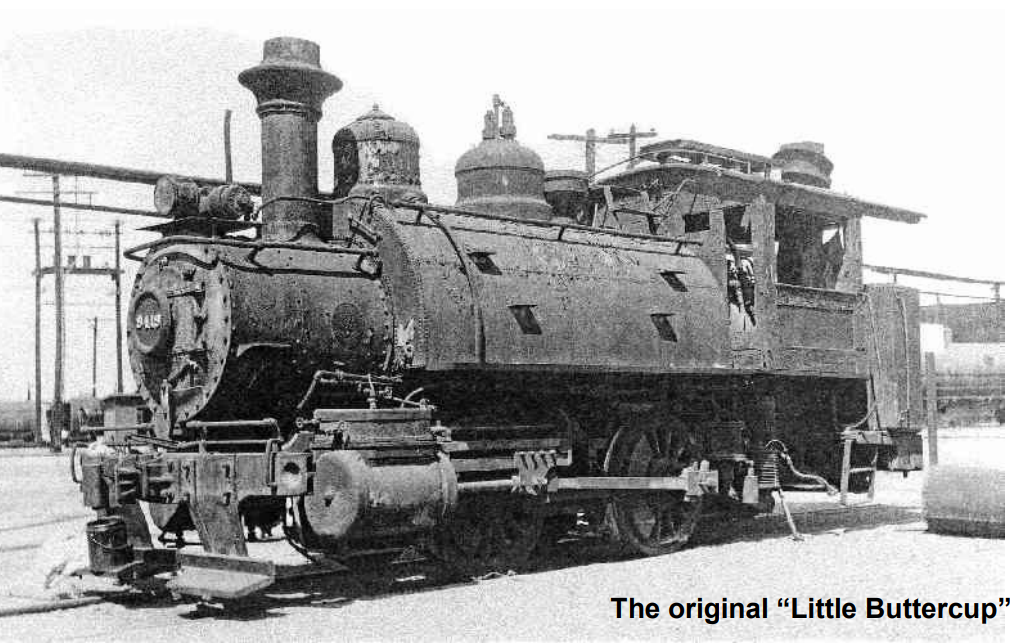
ATSF #5 "Little Buttercup" in her original "shop goat" appearance, then numbered #2419. Taken 1947 at Needles, CA.

That same year was the Chicago Railroad Fair, and Santa Fe had chosen #9419 to be their exhibition engine. She was rebuilt into a tender engine with an 1800s "Old West" style appearance with a diamond smokestack, gaining the #5 and the name "Little Buttercup," after a 4-4-0 locomotive that had previously carried the name. That one had been scrapped in 1899. After 1948, the Santa Fe had kept "Little Buttercup" in storage, along with some ancient wooden coaches, for exhibitions and special events. She was the star a few commercials for the ATSF, even starring with Randolph Scott in the 1951 film Santa Fe where she was driven by a Native American chief.

"Little Buttercup" was eventually donated with the rest of the ATSF's historical collection to the California State Railroad Museum in 1986, where she attended their famed "Railfair" event the same year. The locomotive is now on long-term loan to the California Trolley and Railroad Corporation, and is currently on display in their Trolley Barn at the History Park at Kelley Park.
