= California Trolley and Railroad Corporation =

US non-profit organization

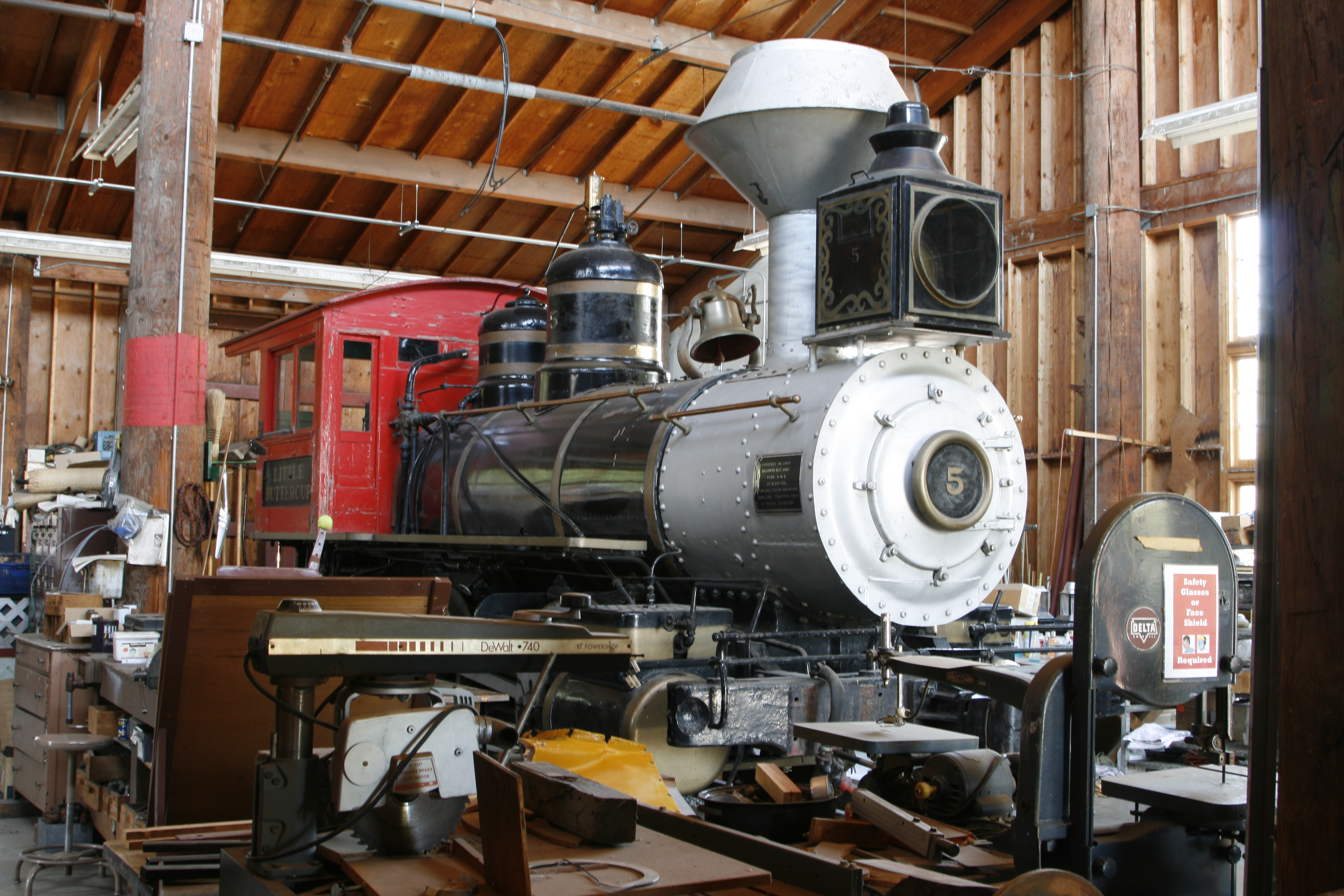
- AT&SF locomotive #5, 16 August 2008
- Founded: July 8, 1982
- Founder: Rod Diridon, Sr.
- Type: Public-benefit corporation
- Tax ID no.: 94-2834764 (CA 501(c)(3))
- Registration no.: C1152615
- Purpose: Railroad museum, Historic preservation
- Location(s): 635 Phelan Avenue; San Jose, California 95112
- Coordinates: 37°19′10″N 121°51′26″W
- Origins: merger of Santa Clara Valley Railroad Association and the San Jose Trolley Corporation
- Region served: South Bay
- Website: www.ctrc.org

Established in 1982, the California Trolley and Railroad Corporation (CTRC) is a 501(c)(3) non-profit organization to preserve rail transportation in the Santa Clara Valley.

== History ==
=== Streetcars ===
California Trolley and Railroad Corporation (CTRC) was founded in 1982, after Santa Clara County Supervisor Rod Diridon Sr. attended the American Public Transit Association conference in Seattle and saw the operation of the city's historic Waterfront Streetcar. At the time, the county was planning its Guadalupe Corridor light rail line (now part of the VTA light rail system), and Diridon thought having historic rolling stock would create enthusiasm in the community for the line.

The Santa Clara County Transit District (operator of the San Jose light rail system prior to the establishment of VTA) purchased three vintage streetcars and much of the restoration work took place at the History Park at Kelley Park.

"Historic Trolley" service in downtown San Jose began on November 18, 1988, and operated seven days a week (but not during rush hours or evenings). Cars 73 and 124 (see table below) were available for use on this service during its early years, along with 129, which was similar to 124. Weekday service was discontinued in fall 1992, and in 1994 the schedule was cut from year-round service to summer months only, generally from Memorial Day weekend to Labor Day weekend.

In 2004, the Historic Trolley service operated only during the Christmas and holiday season, and this pattern continued through 2008, and running Saturdays-only after 2004. Service was suspended entirely in 2009–2011 before resuming holiday-season-only service in 2012. In 2019, vintage trolley service, known as the Holly Trolley, was provided on Fridays, Saturdays and Sundays from December 6 to December 22, subject to cancellation during inclement weather (planned service on November 29–December 1 was cancelled because of rain). The Holly Trolley did not operate during December 2020 or 2021 due to the COVID-19 pandemic.

Ex-Melbourne & Metropolitan Tramways Board car 531 entered service in January 1990 and ex-Milan car 2001 in October 1992. Car 129 was sold to Sacramento Regional Transit in 1999.

The museum has its own operational trolley line, with rides given for free every weekend. In August 2009 the Corporation opened the Happy Hollow line extension allowing trolley service to the Japanese Friendship Garden and the Happy Hollow Zoo in Kelley Park.

=== Proposed museum ===
In 1992, the CTRC received approval from the Santa Clara County Board of Supervisors to build the San Jose Steam Railroad Museum at the Santa Clara County Fairgrounds. The museum would be contained inside the former six-stall Lenzen Roundhouse and turntable which was built in 1899, damaged in the 1989 Loma Prieta earthquake and donated to the museum by Southern Pacific in 1994. Two locomotives were to be featured at the museum: Southern Pacific 2479, which was donated to the county in 1958 and was to be restored for operation and Southern Pacific 1215 which was to be restored for static display.

In 2002, the Board of Supervisors rescinded their support for the museum at the fairgrounds. The CTRC would spend the next two decades attempting to find and purchase a suitable site for the proposed museum, including attempting to gather funds to buy land near the trolley barn at History Park. Southern Pacific 1215 was placed on display in History Park, but the larger museum never materialized.

On July 4, 2021, the CTRC reached an agreement to move the Lenzen Roundhouse, turntable, and Southern Pacific 2479 to the Niles Canyon Railway in nearby Alameda County.

== Collection ==
Type	Car numbers	Manufacturer	Built	Image	Notes	Ref.
Streetcar	1	Sacramento Electric	1905		Used in Sacramento (1903–06) and Santa Cruz (1906–23). Discovered as derelict in Santa Cruz in 1985. Seats 36. 39 ft × 12.4 ft × 8.25 ft (11.89 m × 3.78 m × 2.51 m) (L×H×W) and 38,000 lb (17,000 kg).	
Streetcar	73	Jewett Car Company	1912		Built in Newark, Ohio, and was owned and operated by San Jose Railroads. Used as a house in 1934 along with Car 124. Seats 36 with 20 standing. 43.5 ft × 11.25 ft × 8.5 ft (13.26 m × 3.43 m × 2.59 m) (L×H×W) and 38,000 lb (17,000 kg).	
Streetcar	124	American Car Company	1912?		Built in St Louis, Missouri, and was owned and operated by San Jose Railroads. Used as a house in 1934 along with Car 73.	
Streetcar	143	St Louis Car Company	1922		Built in St Louis, Missouri, and was operated in Fresno. Is a type of streetcar known as a Birney car.	
Streetcar	168	J. G. Brill Company	1934		Built in Portugal and operated in Porto; moved to San Jose in the early 1980s.	
Streetcar	531	Melbourne & Metropolitan Tramways Board	1928		Retired by the Melbourne tram (streetcar) system in the 1980s and purchased in 1986 for $30,000. Seats 48 with 40 standing. 48 ft × 10.5 ft × 9 ft (14.6 m × 3.2 m × 2.7 m) (L×H×W) and 38,000 lb (17,000 kg). Is a Melbourne W2-class car.	
Streetcar	2001	Officine Meccaniche Lodigiane	1928		Originally from Milan, Italy and donated in the mid-1980s. Enter service October 1992, after conversion to double-ended (bi-directional) configuration (using the front section of same-model Milan car 1943) and addition of a pantograph. Seats 40 with 44 standing. 44.3 ft × 10.6 ft × 7.75 ft (13.50 m × 3.23 m × 2.36 m) (L×H×W) and 40,000 lb (18,000 kg).	
