= Southern Pacific 2479 =

Preserved SP P-10 class 4-6-2 locomotive

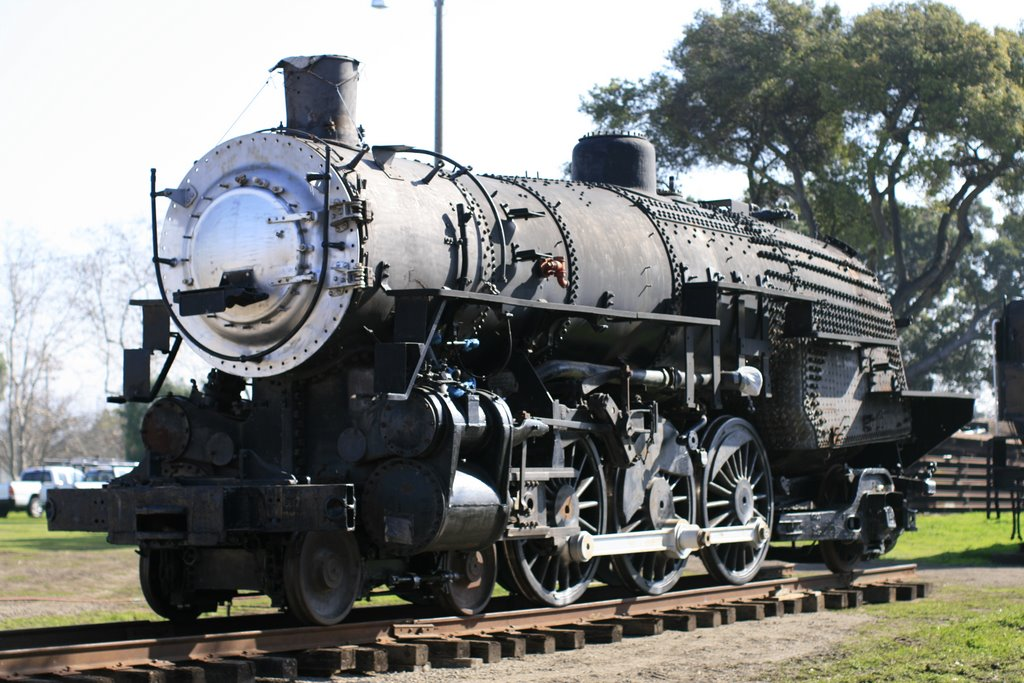
- No. 2479 undergoing restoration to operating condition in early 2009
Type and origin
- Power type: Steam
- Builder: Baldwin Locomotive Works
- Serial number: 57228
- Build date: October 1923
- Rebuild date: August 2, 1941
Specifications
- Configuration
  - Whyte: 4-6-2
  - UIC: 2'C1'
- Gauge: 4 ft 8 1/2 in (1,435 mm) standard gauge
- Driver dia.: 73 in (1,854 mm)
- Wheelbase: 75.80 ft (23.10 m)
  - Engine: 35.50 ft (10.82 m)
  - Drivers: 13 ft (4.0 m)
- Axle load: 60,700 lb (27,500 kg)
- Adhesive weight: 180,700 lb (82,000 kg)
- Loco weight: 300,000 lb (136,100 kg)
- Tender weight: 221,900 lb (100,700 kg)
- Total weight: 521,900 lb (236,700 kg)
- Fuel type: Oil
- Fuel capacity: 4,000 US gal (15,000 L; 3,300 imp gal)
- Water cap.: 12,000 US gal (45,000 L; 10,000 imp gal)
- Firebox
  - Grate area: 52.20 sq ft (4.850 m^{2})
- Boiler pressure: 200 psi (1.4 MPa)
- Heating surface
  - Firebox: 200.40 sq ft (18.618 m^{2})
- Cylinders: Two, outside
- Cylinder size: 25 in × 30 in (635 mm × 762 mm)
- Valve gear: Walschaerts
- Valve type: Piston valves
- Loco brake: Air
- Train brakes: Air
- Couplers: Knuckle
Performance figures
- Tractive effort: 43,660 lbf (194.21 kN)
- Factor of adh.: 4.17
Career
- Operators: Southern Pacific Railroad
- Class: P-10
- Number in class: 6
- Numbers: SP 2479
- Delivered: December 1, 1923
- Retired: July 19, 1956
- Preserved: September 6, 1958
- Current owner: Pacific Locomotive Association
- Disposition: Undergoing restoration to operating condition

Southern Pacific 2479 is one of six 4-6-2 heavy "Pacific" type steam locomotives built by Baldwin Locomotive Works in 1923 for the Southern Pacific Railroad (SP), designated the P-10 class. No. 2479 was retired from service in 1956. The locomotive is currently undergoing restoration to operating condition by the Pacific Locomotive Association at Brightside, California.

== History ==
=== Design ===
The six locomotives in No. 2479's class were designed to pull such trains as the Overland Limited between Sparks, Nevada, and Ogden, Utah, a total 568 miles (914 km), without changing engines. Average speed was 35 mph including stops. This would require road speeds of about 60 mph (97 km/h).

Performance proved most satisfactory and thereby set the basic design for all remaining Pacifics built for Southern Pacific Railroad (SP). The Pacific held many long distance assignments including the Daylight Limited between San Francisco and Los Angeles, the Sunset Limited between Los Angeles and El Paso, Texas, and the Sparks to Ogden run. As larger 4-8-2 class locomotives were assigned to these name trains, the 4-6-2 classes were reassigned to local passenger runs between Sacramento and Oakland and the San Francisco-San Jose, California, commuter service. The 2479 ended its service on these routes. On August 2, 1941, No. 2479 was rebuilt at the Southern Pacific Railroad's Bayshore shops increasing its boiler pressure to 210 psi, and its tractive effort to 45,850 lb (20,800 kg).

=== Preservation ===
No. 2479 was retired from revenue service on July 19, 1956, as steam locomotion technology was replaced with newer diesel locomotives. No. 2479 was donated and moved to the Santa Clara County Fairgrounds on September 6, 1958, where it became one of three surviving Southern Pacific 4-6-2 steam locomotives, the other two being SP Nos. 2472 and 2467.

=== Restoration ===
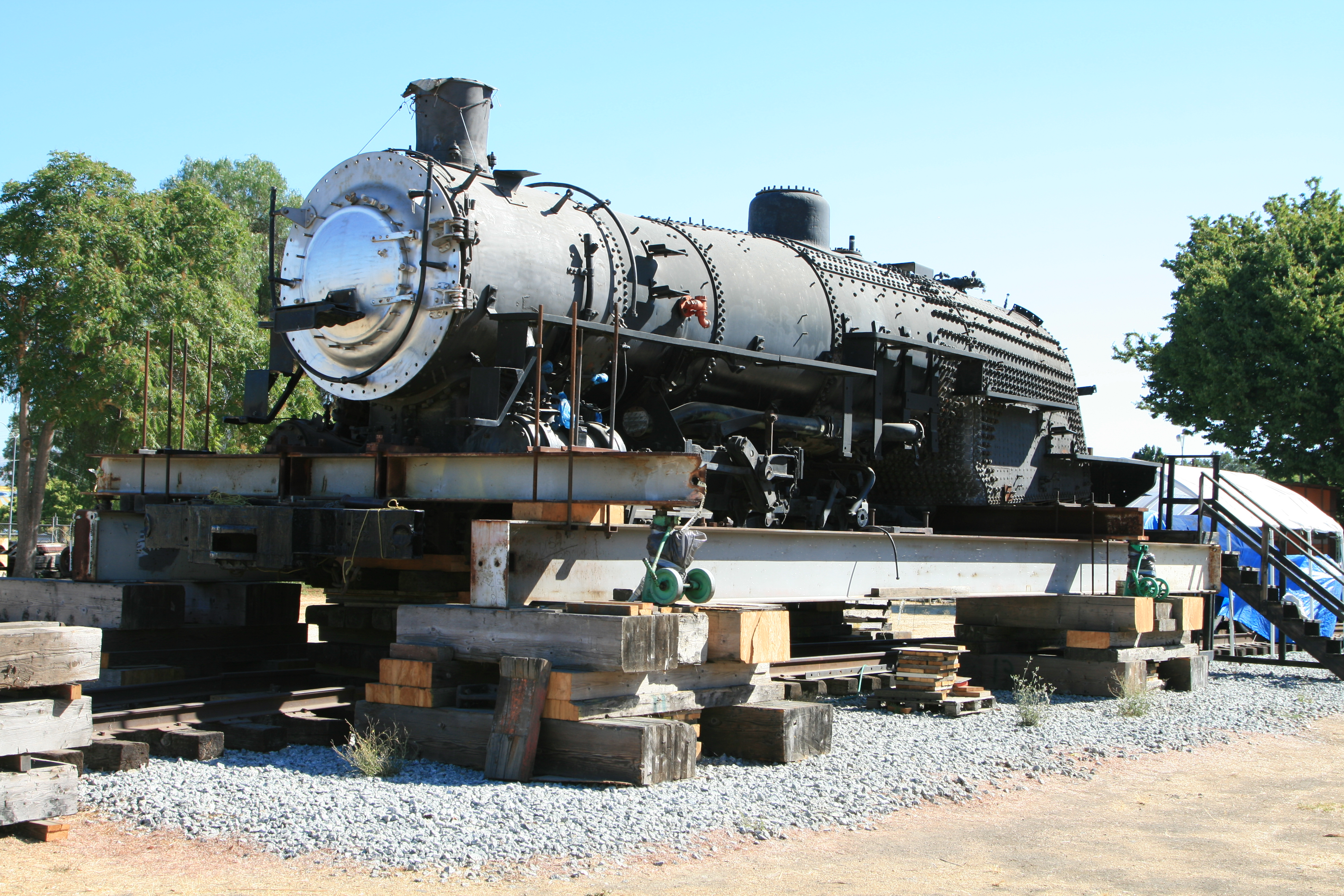
Southern Pacific Locomotive 2479 being restored in its cribbing prior to the trucks and wheels being re-installed at the San Jose, CA Fairgrounds.

Beginning in 1989, the volunteers of the Santa Clara Valley Railroad Association (SCVRRA), and its successor organization, the California Trolley and Railroad Corporation (CTRC), averaged over 5,000 hours per year on the restoration of No. 2479. This amounted to approximately twenty-five person years expended. This represents time spent directly on the locomotive and does not include the many hours spent attempting to raise funds, recruit and train volunteers, and do the administrative tasks that are required of any organization whether for profit or not.

At the end of 1994, the SCVRRA merged with the San Jose Trolley Corporation to form the California Trolley and Railroad Corporation, a not-for-profit educational organization with the mission to preserve historic rail equipment of importance to the history of the Santa Clara Valley and to provide an interpretive venue. One of the underlying reasons for the merger was that the new organization could be a more effective fund raising vehicle.

The previous principal source of funding for the locomotive restoration had been the Santa Clara County Historical Heritage Commission and volunteer fund raising efforts over the years. Approximately, $350,000 had been raised. Of this amount $230,000 represents the cost of the boiler repair done by a professional boiler contractor required by federal and state law. The work on the boiler was begun by Manley Boiler Repair in May 1998. Work continued to progress as 2479's pistons were removed from its cylinders. At the end of October 2008 the CTRC passed a major milestone as No. 2479's front and rear trucks, the 6 main drivers where reinstalled below the locomotive and the locomotive was lowered to the ground for the first time in 15 years.

No. 2479 had been displayed at the Santa Clara County Fairgrounds in San Jose, California, and remained at there while undergoing restoration. Under pressure to relocate, the CTRC sought a permanent home for its historic railroad collection for many years, but was unsuccessful. In 2021, CTRC and Pacific Locomotive Association (PLA) announced the locomotive's ownership would be transferred from Santa Clara County to the PLA along with the San Jose roundhouse, turntable, and water tower. The PLA has started to process of relocating this collection to their Niles Canyon Railway in Fremont, California. On August 23, 2022, the locomotive’s boiler was separated from its frame and running gear. Those components were then loaded onto trucks for a short trip to Bonita, CA. The locomotive arrived at its destination the same day, and the boiler, frame, and running gear were reunited. Southern Pacific 1195, a preserved EMD SW900R diesel switcher, coupled to No. 2479, and towed it to the Niles Canyon Railway’s Brightside Yard, in Brightside, CA. It arrived on NICX's property in October 2022. As of October 2026, restoration is still in progress.

== 1937 accident ==
In February 1937, disaster struck the No. 2479. Pulling a passenger train called "The Owl" and steaming at 70 mph as it approached Selma, California, the locomotive struck a car lodged on the tracks. The impact indirectly caused the locomotive, its tender and seven cars to derail. The engine's pilot was bent on impact with the automobile and caught at the next grade crossing throwing the locomotive off the rails. Both the engineer and the fireman were killed.

Although No. 2479 experienced heavy damage, it was rebuilt and placed back in revenue service.

== See also ==
- Southern Pacific 2353
- Southern Pacific 745
- Southern Pacific 786
- Santa Fe 1316

== Bibliography ==
- Kean, Randolph (1973). The Railfan's Guide to Museum & Park Displays. H. E. Cox. p. 35.
- Western Railroader and the Western Railfan. Francis A. Guido. 1986. p. 6.
- Railfan & Railroad. Vol. 11. Carstens Publications. 1992. p. 45.
- Kalmbach Publishing Company Staff (2000). Guide to Tourist Railroads and Museums. Kalmbach Publishing Company. p. 55.
