= List of preserved Southern Pacific Railroad rolling stock =

A large quantity of rolling stock formerly owned and operated by Southern Pacific Railroad have been preserved in museums, on tourist railroads, and various other locations all across North America.

== Preserved steam locomotives ==
Photograph	Number/name	Build date	Builder	Class	Wheel arrangement (Whyte notation)	Disposition and Location	Notes	Refs.
	CP 1 Gov. Stanford	1862	Norris	-	4-4-0	Static display, California State Railroad Museum, Sacramento, California		
	ST&E 1	1864	Norris-Lancaster	-	4-4-0	Static display, Travel Town Museum, Los Angeles, California		
	UP 737/SP 216	1887	Baldwin	E-21	4-4-0	On static display as Southern Pacific #216		
	SA&AP 60; Texas II	1922	Baldwin	-	4-4-0	Stored, Gulf and Ohio Railways, Knoxville, Tennessee		
	EP&SW 1	May 1857	Breese, Kneeland, and Company	-	4-4-0	Static display, El Paso, Texas		
	T&NO 146			S-13	0-6-0	Farmington, New Mexico		
	1 C. P. Huntington				4-2-4T	Static display, California State Railroad Museum, Sacramento, California		
	8				4-6-0	Narrow gauge locomotive; Sparks, Nevada		
	9				4-6-0	Narrow gauge locomotive; undergoing restoration; Laws, California		
	18				4-6-0	Narrow gauge locomotive; operational; Independence, California		
	CP 60; Jupiter (replica)				4-4-0	Original scrapped, replica is operational, Golden Spike National Historic Site, Promontory, Utah		
	CP 63 "Leviathan" (replica)				4-4-0	Original scrapped, replica is operational, later relettered as Pennsylvania Railroad No. 331, owned by Stone Gable Estates, Elizabethtown, Pennsylvania		
	101	1920	Alco		2-8-2	Now Valley Railroad 40. Formerly Minarets and Western 101, acquired when the SP bought the railroad. Deemed too small, later sold to Birmingham Rail & Locomotive.		
	219	November 1880	Baldwin	-	0-4-0T	Static display Travel Town Museum, Los Angeles, California	Narrow gauge, currently numbered 20.	
	CP 233				2-6-2T	Stored, California State Railroad Museum, Sacramento, California		
	745			Mk-5	2-8-2	Undergoing boiler inspection, Louisiana Steam Train Association, Jefferson, Louisiana		
	771			Mk-5	2-8-2	Static display, Grapevine Vintage Railroad, Grapevine, Texas		
	786			Mk-5	2-8-2	Undergoing restoration, Austin Steam Train Association, Austin, Texas		
	794			Mk-5	2-8-2	Static display, Sunset Station, San Antonio, Texas		
	842	March 1924	Lima	-	0-6-0	Static display, Terry Depot, Terry, Mississippi	Previously Texas and New Orleans 156, incorrectly displayed as 841.	
	975			F-1	2-10-2	Static display, Illinois Railway Museum, Union, Illinois		
	982			F-1	2-10-2	Static display; Minute Maid Park, Houston, Texas. Not to be confused with the Minute Maid Park ornamental train.		
	1215			S-10	0-6-0	Static display, History Park at Kelley Park, San Jose, CA, owned by the California Trolley and Railroad Corporation.		
	1221			S-10	0-6-0	Deming, New Mexico		
	1227			S-11	0-6-0	Sierra Northern Railway, Oakdale, California		
	1229			S-11	0-6-0	Roseburg, Oregon		
	1233			S-10	0-6-0	Woodland, California		
	1237			S-10	0-6-0	Static display, Salinas, California		
	1238			S-10	0-6-0	Kingsburg Station, Kingsburg, California		
	1251			S-12	0-6-0	Stored, dismantled, awaiting funds for restoration, Virginia City, Nevada		
	1258			S-12	0-6-0	Martinez, California		
	1269			S-12	0-6-0	Stored, unserviceable, Niles Canyon Railway, Sunol, California		
	1273			S-12	0-6-0	Static display, Travel Town Museum, Los Angeles, California		
	1285			S-14	0-6-0	Monterey, California		
	1293			S-14	0-6-0	Tracy, California		
	1298			S-10	0-6-0	Santa Cruz, California		
	1629	1900	Schenectady Locomotive Works	M-4	2-6-0	Static display, Saugus station, Saugus, California		
	1673			M-4	2-6-0	Static display, Southern Arizona Transportation Museum (Southern Pacific Depot), Tucson, Arizona		
	1727			M-6	2-6-0	Static display, in Dunsmuir, California at the Dunsmuir City Park and Botanical Gardens		
	1744			M-6	2-6-0	The Pacific Locomotive Association purchased and began the restoration to bring No. 1744 back into operation on the Niles Canyon Railway.		
	1765			M-6	2-6-0	Lomita Railroad Museum, Lomita, California		
	1771			M-8	2-6-0	Undergoing restoration, California State Railroad Museum, Sacramento, California		
	1774			M-8	2-6-0	Static display, Veterans Memorial Park, Globe, Arizona		
	1785			M-6	2-6-0	Woodburn, Oregon		
	2018			T-16	4-6-0	Los Mochis, Sinaloa, Mexico		
	2248	July 10, 1896	Cooke Locomotive and Machine Company	T-1	4-6-0	Grapevine Vintage Railroad, Grapevine, Texas		
	2252	March 1897	Cooke Locomotive and Machine Company	T-1	4-6-0	Static display, downtown Roseville, California		
	2353			T-31	4-6-0	Static display, Pacific Southwest Railway Museum, Campo, California		
	2355			T-31	4-6-0	Static display, Pioneer Park, Mesa, Arizona		
	2467	March 1921	Baldwin	P-8	4-6-2	Static display, operable, California State Railroad Museum, Sacramento California		
	2472	January 1921	Baldwin	P-8	4-6-2	Undergoing boiler inspection, operated at the Niles Canyon Railway from 2008 to 2015, originally at Sunol, California, now at Schellville, California		
	2479	October 1923	Baldwin	P-10	4-6-2	Undergoing restoration by the California Trolley and Railroad Corporation, Santa Clara County Fairgrounds, San Jose, California. Since moved to Niles Canyon Railway.		
	2521			C-9	2-8-0	Static display, Colorado River State Historic Park, Yuma, Arizona		
	2562			C-9	2-8-0	Static display, Arizona Railway Museum, Chandler, Arizona		
	2579			C-9	2-8-0	Klamath Falls, Oregon Veterans Memorial Park		
	2706	1904	Baldwin	C-8	2-8-0	Privately owned, Colusa, California		
	2718			C-8	2-8-0	Alturas, California		
	2720			C-8	2-8-0	Static display, Pacific Southwest Railway Museum, Campo, California		
	2825			C-9	2-8-0	San Bernardino County Museum, Loma Linda, California		
Southern Pacific Locomotive 2852	2852	1919	Southern Pacific Shops, Sacramento, California	C-10	2-8-0	Static display, Glenn County Fairgrounds, Orland, California		
	2914			TW-8	4-8-0	Bakersfield, California		
	3025			A-3	4-4-2	Static display, Travel Town Museum, Los Angeles, California		
	3420			C-19	2-8-0	Stored at Phelps Dodge copper refinery, El Paso, Texas. Last run 1986. Needs boiler work to be FRA legal for running. Owned by El Paso Historic Board.		
	4294	March 1944	Baldwin	AC-12	4-8-8-2	Static display, California State Railroad Museum, Sacramento, California. Awaiting a possible restoration that was discussed by the CSRM themselves.		
	4449	May 20, 1941	Lima	GS-4	4-8-4	Operational, Oregon Rail Heritage Center, Portland, Oregon		
	4460		Lima	GS-6	4-8-4	Static display, National Museum of Transportation, St. Louis, Missouri		
	5021			SP-2	4-10-2	Static display, Los Angeles County Fairgrounds, Pomona, California		

=== Preserved steam locomotive parts ===
Photograph	Number/name	Build date	Builder	Class	Wheel arrangement (Whyte notation)	Surviving part and where it's currently on	Refs.
	4219	March 1942	Baldwin	AC-10	4-8-8-2	Tender, operating with CP 2816	
	4422	November 26, 1937	Lima	GS-3	4-8-4	Wheel, displayed at the RailGiants Train Museum in Pomona, California	
	4437	April 29, 1941	Lima	GS-4	4-8-4	One of its wheels on SP 4449	
	4443	May 15, 1941	Lima	GS-4	4-8-4	Pilot truck on SP 4449	
	4450	March 27, 1942	Lima	GS-4	4-8-4	Trailing truck on SP 4449	

== Preserved diesel locomotives ==
Photograph	Number	Build date	Builder	Model	Class	Disposition and Location	Notes	Refs.
	1000	January 1939	EMD	SW1	ES406-1	Stored, California State Railroad Museum, Sacramento, California.		
	1006	November 1939	EMD	SW1	ES406-2	Operational, Southern California Railway Museum, Perris, California		
	1100	November 1950	EMD	TR6A (SW8)	ES408-1	Operational, Western Pacific Railroad Museum, Portola, California		
	1201	May 1955	ALCO	S-6	AS409-1	Operational, National Railroad Museum, Green Bay, Wisconsin	GB&W 106	
	1207	May 1955	ALCO	S-6	AS409-1	Stored, Fillmore and Western Railway, Fillmore, California		
	1218	April 1955	ALCO	S-6	AS409-1	Undergoing restoration, Niles Canyon Railway, Sunol, California		
	1226	June 1956	ALCO	S-6	AS409-3	Operational, Virginia and Truckee Railroad, Nevada		
	1239	August 1956	ALCO	S-6	AS409-3	Stored, Age of Steam Roundhouse, Sugarcreek, Ohio		
	1251	December 1956	ALCO	S-6	AS409-4	Stored, Fillmore and Western Railway, Fillmore, California		
	1277	December 1945	ALCO	S-6	AS409-5	Stored, Fillmore and Western Railway, Fillmore, California		
	1474		ALCO	S-4		Operational, Southern California Railway Museum, Perris, California		
	1487	January 1953	FM	H-12-44	DS-113	Operational, Niles Canyon Railway, Sunol, California.	Replica, ex-US Army #1874	
	1550		Baldwin	S-12		Stored, Southern California Railway Museum, Perris, California		
	2379	January 1956	FM	H-12-44	FS412-4	Operational, Museum of the American Railroad in Frisco, Texas		
	2919	April 1959	ALCO	RS-11		Operational, Napa Valley Wine Train, Napa, California	Napa Valley no. 62	
	2954	February 1961	ALCO	RSD-12	AS618-1	Stored, Southern California Railway Museum, Perris, California		
	2958	February 1961	ALCO	RSD-12	AS618-1	Operational, Southern California Railway Museum, Perris, California		
	2962	March 1961	ALCO	RSD-12	AS618-1	Stored, Arkansas Railroad Museum, Pine Bluff, Arkansas		
	3634	April 1957	EMD	GP9	EF418-7	Operational, Madison Railroad in Madison, Indiana	CMPA GP10 #3634	
	3709	August 1959	EMD	GP9	EF418-9	Undergoing operational restoration, Pacific Southwest Railway Museum Association, Campo, California		
	4002	April 1962	ALCO	RS-32	AF420-1	Operational, Genesee Valley Transportation, Batavia, New York		
	4004	April 1962	ALCO	RS-32	AF420-1	Static display, Pacific Southwest Railway Museum Association, Campo, California		
	4009	April 1962	ALCO	RS-32	AF420-1	Operational, Fillmore and Western Railway, Ventura County, California		
	4079	April 1962	EMD	GP20	EF420-1	Operational at the Ottawa Northern Railroad in Baldwin City, Kansas		
	5100		GE	70-ton	GS407-1	Stored, serviceable, Oregon Pacific Railroad, Milwaukie, Oregon		
	5103		GE	70-ton	GS407-1	Stored at the Sumpter Valley Railway in McEwen, OR		
	5119		GE	70-ton		Operational, Pacific Southwest Railway Museum Association, Campo, California		
	5208	May 1949	Baldwin	DRS-6-6-1500	DF-101	Stored, California State Railroad Museum, Sacramento, California		
	5253	March 31, 1952	Baldwin	AS-616		Static display, Western Pacific Railroad Museum, Portola, California		
	5274	May 15, 1952	Baldwin	AS-616		Static display, Western Pacific Railroad Museum, Portola, California		
	5387	August 1978	EMD	SD40T-2		Owned by the Midwest Overland Rail Preservation Society		
	6051	December 1954	EMD	E9	EP624A-1	Operational, California State Railroad Museum, Sacramento, California		
	"6304"	September 1954	GMD	FP9A	-	Operational, Eastend Scenic Rail Tours, Eastend, Saskatchewan	Ex-CN 6509	
	6378	July 1952	EMD	F7A	DF-8	Stored, serviceable, Niles Canyon Railway, Sunol, California		
	6380	July 1952	EMD	F7A	DF-8	Stored, serviceable, Niles Canyon Railway, Sunol, California		
	6402	August 1952	EMD	F7A	DF-8	Stored, operational, California State Railroad Museum, Sacramento, California		
	6443	February 1953	EMD	F7A	EF415A-11	Operational, Galveston Railroad Museum, Galveston, Texas	Currently Santa Fe 315	
	7815	March 1978	GE	B30-7	GF430-2	Owned by the Midwest Overland Rail Preservation Society		
	7863	April 1979	GE	B30-7	GF430-3	Stored, Creede, Colorado		
	7880	May 1979	GE	B30-7	GF430-3	-		
	8007	August 1987	GE	B39-8	GF439-1	Operational at the Albany and Eastern Railroad in Lebanon, Oregon		
	8540	January 1979	EMD	SD40T-2	EF630-8	Stored, Fire Training Academy San Antonio, Texas		
	9010	March 1964	Krauss-Maffei	ML-4000	DF-802	Operational, based at the Niles Canyon Railway in Sunol, California		

=== Preserved diesel locomotive parts ===
Photograph	Number	Build date	Builder	Model	Class	Surviving part and where it's currently on	Notes	Refs.
	2351	September 1952	FM	H-12-44	FS412-1	Headlight, on the second SP 1487 (ex-US Army no. 1847), at Golden Gate Railroad Museum (GGRM) at Schellville, California	First SP 1487	

== Preserved rebuilt diesel locomotives ==
Photograph	Number	Build date	Builder	Rebuild date	Model	Class	Disposition and Location	Notes	Refs.
	1423	June 1949	EMD	September 14, 1972	NW2E	DS-109	Operational, Niles Canyon Railway, Sunol, California	Ex-SP 1335	
	1518	May 1951	EMD	February 5, 1980	SD7R	EF615R-1	Operational, Illinois Railway Museum, Union, Illinois	EMD #990	
	1530	November 1952	EMD	April 15, 1980	SD7R	EF615R-1	Under ownership of Dieselmotive Company, Inc., stored at Blackwell, Oklahoma	Portland and Western 1501	
	1533	August 1953	EMD	April 29, 1980	SD7R	EF615R-1	Under ownership of Dieselmotive Company, Inc., stored at Chemurgic in Turlock, California		
	2873	December 1956	EMD	February 18. 1977	GP9R	ES418R-3	Operational, Western Pacific Railroad Museum, Portola, California		
	3100	March 29, 1963	GE	September 29, 1975	U25BE	GF425E-1	Operational, Southern California Railway Museum, Perris, California		
	3190	April 1955	EMD	August 22, 1977	GP9R	EP418R-1/EF418R-6	Under ownership of Dieselmotive Company, Inc.		
	3191	May 1954	EMD	October 21, 1977	GP9R	EP418R-1/EF418R-6	Operational, West Virginia Central Railroad (WVC), Elkins, West Virginia		
	3194	May 1954	EMD	April 21, 1978	GP9R	EP418R-1/EF418R-6	Stored, operational, Niles Canyon Railway, Sunol, California		
	3311	January 1955	EMD	May 11, 1970	GP9E	EF418E-1	Operational, California Western Railroad, Mendocino County, California		
	3312	May 1954	EMD	May 14, 1970	GP9E	EF418E-1	Operational, Great Smoky Mountains Railroad in Bryson City, North Carolina	GSMR #1751	
	3397	April 1956	EMD	February 1974	GP9E	EF418E-2	Operational, Great Smoky Mountains Railroad in Bryson City, North Carolina	GSMR #1755	
	3411	October 1954	EMD	January 1975	GP9E	EF418E-2	Operational, California Western Railroad, Mendocino County, California		
	3769	January 1957	EMD	September 1974	GP9E	EF418E-3	On static display at the Utah State Railroad Museum in Ogden, Utah		
	3790	January 1957	EMD	June 1976	GP9E	EF418E-3	Under ownership of Dieselmotive Company, Inc., stored at West Burlington, Iowa		
	3804	March 1957	EMD	September 1977	GP9E	EF418R-3	Under ownership of Dieselmotive Company, Inc.		
	3843	February 1959	EMD	December 1976	GP9E	EF418E-4	Operational, Indiana Railroad Museum in French Lick, Indiana		
	3855	April 1959	EMD	September 1977	GP9R	EF418R-4	Under ownership of Dieselmotive Company, Inc., stored at South Haven, Kansas	Portland and Western 1801	
	3859	February 1959	EMD	January 9, 1978	GP9R	EF418R-4	Operational at the Albany and Eastern Railroad in Lebanon, Oregon	AERC 1750	
	3873	February 1959	EMD	July 1977	GP9R	EF418CR-4	Operational at the Pacific Southwest Railway Museum Association, Campo, California		
	3885	September 1959	EMD	January 1978	GP9R	EF418R-5	Operational at the Mount Hood Railroad in Portland, Oregon	Currently MHRR 88	
	4102	February 1962	EMD	June 30, 1975	GP20E	EF420E-2	On static display in Manly, Iowa		
	4125	February 1962	EMD	February 16, 1979	GP20R	EF420R-2	Operational, Blue Ridge Scenic Railway, Blue Ridge, Georgia		
	4304	May 1954	EMD	September 10, 1970	SD9E	EF618E-1	Stored in Willits, California (coordinates: 39°24'24.5"N 123°20'55.7"W)	Owned by BUGX	
	4306	March 1954	EMD	September 16, 1970	SD9E	EF618E-1	Operational at DeBruce Grain Inc.		
	4324	April 1954	EMD	December 22, 1970	SD9E	EF618E-1	Stored at the Burlington Junction Railway (BJRY) in Burlington, Iowa.	Owned by BUGX	
	4331	January 1955	EMD	February 5, 1971	SD9E	EF618E-1	Operational at Pixley, California		
	4347	February 1955	EMD	April 26, 1971	SD9E	EF618E-1	Stored in Schellville, California		
	4353	January 1956	EMD	June 30, 1972	SD9E	EF618E-1	Stored on the Nebraska Northwestern Railroad (NNW) in Chadron, Nebraska		
	4371	March 1955	EMD	September 13, 1973	SD9E	EF618E-1	Stored at Chemurgic in Turlock, California		
	4373	May 1955	EMD	October 31, 1973	SD9E	EF618E-1	Stored on the Nebraska Northwestern Railroad (NNW) in Chadron, Nebraska		
	4397	May 1955	EMD	January 9, 1975	SD9E	EF618E-1	Under ownership of Dieselmotive Company, Inc., stored at West Burlington, Iowa		
	4401	March 1956	EMD	June 9, 1975	SD9E	EF618E-1	Stored at Chemurgic in Turlock, California		
	4404	April 1955	EMD	September 15, 1975	SD9E	EF618E-1	Stored on the Pend Oreille Valley Railroad (POVA) in Usk, Washington		
	4409	January 1955	EMD	January 16, 1976	SD9E	EF618E-1	Operational at the Turlock and Western Railroad or at Chemurgic in Turlock, California		
	4426	February 1956	EMD	June 15, 1977	SD9E	EF618R-1	Operational at the Nevada Northern Railway Museum, Ely, Nevada	Nevada Northern #250	
	4433	April 1955	EMD	December 19, 1977	SD9E	EF618R-1	Donated to the Oregon Rail Heritage Foundation, Portland, Oregon		
	4436	March 1955	EMD	March 6, 1978	SD9E	EF618R-1	Stored in Schellville, California		
	4439	May 1955	EMD	March 18, 1980	SD9E	EF618R-1	Stored in Potlatch, Idaho		
	4451	April 1954	EMD	February 14, 1974	SD9E	EF618E-2	Stored in Schellville, California	nicknamed "Puff"	
	5399	February 1955	EMD	January 12, 1973	SD9E	DF-122	Operational at the Albany and Eastern Railroad in Lebanon, Oregon	Ex-SP #4364, SP Class EF618E-1	
	5472	March 1956	EMD	May 27, 1977	SD9E	DF-125	Operational at the Niles Canyon Railway in Sunol, California	Ex-SP #4423, SP Class EF618R-1	
	5623	April 1955	EMD	April 15, 1977	GP9R	DF-606	Operational at the Niles Canyon Railway in Sunol, California	Ex-SP #3189	
	6303	December 1963	EMD	November 30, 1978	GP35R	EF425K-1	Operational at the Albany and Eastern Railroad in Lebanon, Oregon		
	6819	March 1972	EMD	August 24, 1987	SD45T-2R	EF636R-7	Operational at the California State Railroad Museum in Sacramento, California		
	7351	May 1968	EMD	February 13, 1981	SD40R	EF630LR-2	Operational at the Wheeling and Lake Erie Railway in Brewster, Ohio	Currently Wheeling and Lake Erie 6984	
	7362	May 1966	EMD	April 10, 1981	SD40R	EF630LR-2	On static display at the Mid-Plains Community College in North Platte, Nebraska		
	7457	August 1966	EMD	September 1982	SD45R	EF636LR-5	On static display at the Utah State Railroad Museum in Ogden, Utah	Ex-SP 8800, the first SD45 built for SP	

=== Preserved rebuilt diesel locomotive parts ===
Photograph	Number	Build date	Builder	Rebuild date	Model	Class	Surviving part and where it's currently on	Notes	Refs.
	3195	April 1955	EMD	March 16, 1979	GP9R	EP418R-1/EF418R-6	Rear pilot, on SP 3189 (now SP 5623)		
	4405	April 1955	EMD	September 30, 1975	SD9E	EF618E-1	Nose/Front hood, displayed at the Astoria Riverfront Trolley Barn in Astoria, Oregon. (Coordinates: 46°11'08.4"N 123°51'32.5"W)		

== Preserved passenger cars ==
Photograph	Number/Name	Builder	Type	Class	Disposition	References
	109	Pullman	business car	-	Stored, California State Railroad Museum, Sacramento, Ca.	
	121	Pullman	business car/observation car	-	Undergoing restoration; Niles Canyon Railway, Sunol, Ca.	
	122 Sacramento	Barney & Smith	business car/observation car	-	Stored, Southern California Railway Museum, Perris, CA	
	127	Pullman	business car/observation car	-	Undergoing restoration; Elmendorf Heritage and Railroad Museum, Elmendorf, Texas.	
	141	Pullman	business car/observation car	-	In service; Niles Canyon Railway, Sunol, Ca.	
	219	Pullman-Standard	instruction car	-	Stored, California State Railroad Museum, Sacramento, Ca.	
	290	Budd	diner	-	Stored, California State Railroad Museum, Sacramento, Ca.	
	291	Budd	lounge	-	Stored, California State Railroad Museum, Sacramento, Ca.	
	293	Pullman	business car/coach	-	In service; Niles Canyon Railway, Sunol, Ca.	
	401	Carter Brothers	baggage-coach	-	Static display; Laws Railroad Museum, Laws, California	
	1949	Pullman	"Harriman" coach	-	In service; Niles Canyon Railway, Sunol, Ca.	
	1975	Pullman	all day lunch car	-	In service; Niles Canyon Railway, Sunol, Ca.	
	2085–2159	Pullman	suburban coach	-	Of the 75 built for service on the Peninsula Commute, 27 were operable in 1980 and 10 were considered suitable for parts only. After leaving commute service in 1985, most are now in service or in storage at various railroad museums/tourist lines, including: Thirteen cars, restored and converted to electric heating; currently in service with the Grand Canyon Railway.; 2097, 2143, 2156 at Golden Gate Railroad Museum; 2101, 2114 at Niles Canyon Railway; 2139, 2140 at Railtown 1897; 2093, 2113 at Western Railway Museum; 2091, 2095, 2106, 2148 at Timber Heritage Association; 2144 at Southern California Railway Museum	
	2127	Pullman	suburban coach	-	Undergoing restoration; Oregon Coast Scenic Railroad, Tillamook, Oregon	
	2360	Pullman	coach	-	Stored, Niles Canyon Railway, Sunol, Ca.	
	2373	Pullman	coach	-	Available for lease as GOLDEN SHORE from American Rail Excursions	
	2377 GOLDEN ORE	Budd	coach	-	In use as 2095 ANASAZI at Grand Canyon Railway	
	2378 GOLDEN SAND	Budd	coach	-	Available for lease as GOLDEN SAND from Mid America Railcar Leasing	
	2397 Shasta Springs	Pullman	coach	-	Owned by PRS, stored at the Southern California Railway Museum	
	2445-2446	Pullman	articulated coach	-	Owned by PRS, stored at the Southern California Railway Museum	
	2473–2474	Pullman	articulated coach	-	Undergoing restoration; Niles Canyon Railway, Sunol, Ca.	
	2979	Pullman	lounge car	-	Undergoing restoration; Niles Canyon Railway, Sunol, Ca	
	2981 Overland Trail	Pullman-Standard	Club/Lounge w/barbershop	-	In service; owned by Bill Hatrick; located at the Western Maryland Scenic as of October 2022	
	3300	Pullman-Standard	Club/Lounge w/barbershop	-	Stored, private owner; Beaverton, Oregon	
	3700, 3701, 3702, 3703, 3707, 3708	Pullman-Standard	Gallery	-	Sold to Transcisco Tours in 1985 and operated on that line; later sold to BNSF and in service as business cars #40 Fox River (ex-SP 3703), #41 Flathead River (ex-SP 3701), #44 Colorado River (ex-SP 3708), and #45 Powder River (ex-SP 3707). Two were rebuilt from business cars to track geometry cars: #80 (renumbered from #43) Rio Grande River (ex-SP 3700) and #87 (renumbered from #42) Skagit River (ex-SP 3702).	
	3734, 3740, 3744, 3745	Pullman-Standard	Gallery	-	Converted to "Ultra Dome" cars and in service with Princess Tours.	
	4300	St. Louis Car Company	postal storage	-	Former SP horse car 7241 located at Arizona Railway Museum	
	5045	Pullman	baggage/RPO car	-	Undergoing restoration; Niles Canyon Railway, Sunol, Ca.	
	5131	Standard Steel Car	baggage/RPO car	70-BP-30-1	Undergoing restoration; Niles Canyon Railway, Sunol, Ca.	
	6235	Pullman	baggage car	-	Undergoing restoration; Niles Canyon Railway, Sunol, Ca.	
	10040	Pullman	dining car	-	Undergoing restoration; Niles Canyon Railway, Sunol, Ca.	
	10277-10278-10279	Pullman	triple articulated diner car	-	Located in Grapevine, TX; owned by the Grapevine Vintage Railroad, stored near Grapevine depot	
	10280–10281–10282	Pullman	triple articulated diner car	-	Undergoing restoration; Niles Canyon Railway, Sunol, Ca.	
	10402 GOLDEN TRENCHER	Pullman Standard	hamburger grill	-	Located at Union Depot Railway Museum	

== Preserved freight cars ==
Photograph	Number	Builder	Type	Disposition
	132		Narrow gauge boxcar	Static display; Laws Railroad Museum, Laws, California
	188		Narrow gauge stock car	Static display; Laws Railroad Museum, Laws, California
	5335		boxcar	Storage; Pacific Northwest Chapter NRHS, unknown location within Oregon
	SSW 23908		boxcar	Display; Western Pacific Railroad Museum, Portola, CA

== Preserved cabooses ==
Photograph	Number	Builder	Type	Disposition	References
	1337		Bay window caboose	Display; C30-6 type; Western Pacific Railroad Museum, Portola, CA	
	1696		Bay window caboose	C-40-5 type; Jubilee Railroad Wilderness Lodge, Dunsmuir, California	
	1886		Bay window caboose	Restoration completed 9/16/16, static display at SLORRM, San Luis Obispo, CA	
	4097		Bay window caboose	C-40-4 type; Jubilee Railroad Wilderness Lodge, Dunsmuir, California	
	4227		Bay window caboose	Rebuilt C-40-5 type; Jubilee Railroad Wilderness Lodge, Dunsmuir, California	
	4706		Bay window caboose	Operational; C50-9 type; Western Pacific Railroad Museum, Portola, CA	
	4770		Bay window caboose	Display, Miller Park, Bloomington, Illinois	
	4727, 4736		Caboose	Renumbered to JPBX 598, 599 and in annual Holiday Train service for Caltrain	

== Preserved maintenance of way equipment ==
Photograph	Number	Builder	Type	Disposition
Southern Pacific MOW 205 Rotary Snow Plow	SPMW 205	ALCO-Cooke	Rotary snowplow	Static display, California State Railroad Museum, Sacramento, California
20120220 Steam Rotary Snowblower at Train Mountain	SPMW 206	ALCO-Cooke	Rotary snowplow	Static display Train Mountain Railroad Chiloquin, Oregon
	SPMW 208		Rotary snowplow and power snail	Operational; Western Pacific Railroad Museum, Portola, CA
Southern Pacific Rotary Snowplow MOW 211	SPMW 211		Rotary snowplow	Static Display, Roseville, California
	SPMW 8209	EMD	Snowplow (originally F7B #6151C)	Undergoing cosmetic restoration at the Museum of the American Railroad in Frisco, Texas
Southern Pacific Rotary snowplow at Western Pacific Railroad Museum, Portola, California	SPMW 8221		Rotary snowplow and power snail	Operational; Western Pacific Railroad Museum, Portola, CA
	SPMW 328		Snow Flanger	Static display; Pacific Northwest Chapter NRHS, Antique Powerland, Brooks, Oregon

== Formerly preserved, scrapped ==
Each locomotive is listed by scrap date

=== Steam locomotives ===
Number	Builder	Build date	Whyte	Class	Last Location	Scrapped	Cause of scrapping	Notes	Refs
743	SP's Algiers Shops	1921	2-8-2	MK-5	Girard Park in Lafayette, Louisiana	1970	Environmental deterioration		
1294	Lima Locomotive Works (LLW)	April 1924	0-6-0	S-14	San Francisco Zoo	1987	Environmental deterioration		

=== Diesel locomotives ===
Number	Builder	Build date	Model	Class	Last seen	Scrapped	Cause of scrapping	Notes	Refs
5239	Baldwin Locomotive Works (BLW)	September 1950	AS-616	DF-112	Tigard, Oregon	November 2009	Poor condition	O&NW #2	
1113	Electro-Motive Division (EMD)	March 1953	SW8	ES408-2	Yreka, California	June 12, 2010	Poor condition and bad crankshaft		
6309	Electro-Motive Division (EMD)	October 1950	F7A	DF-6	Galveston Railroad Museum, Galveston, Texas	June 1, 2011	Severely water damaged by Hurricane Ike on September 13, 2008	Texas Limited #200	
6379	Electro-Motive Division (EMD)	July 1952	F7A	DF-8	Galveston Railroad Museum, Galveston, Texas	June 1, 2011	Severely water damaged by Hurricane Ike on September 13, 2008	Texas Limited #100	

=== Rebuilt diesel locomotives ===
Photograph	Number	Builder	Build date	Rebuild date	Model	Class	Last seen	Scrapped	Cause of scrapping	Notes	Refs
	4338	Electro-Motive Division (EMD)	February 1955	March 12, 1971	SD9E	EF618E-1	Maynard, Minnesota	2010s	Unknown		
	3771	Electro-Motive Division (EMD)	December 1956	December 1974	GP9E	EF418E-3	Tillamook Air Museum in Tillamook, Oregon	2010	Poor condition and shutdown of the POTB	A private owner didn't want #3771 to be scrapped.	
	4368	Electro-Motive Division (EMD)	April 1955	July 31, 1973	SD9E	EF618E-1	Tillamook Air Museum in Tillamook, Oregon	2010	Poor condition and shutdown of the POTB		
	4414	Electro-Motive Division (EMD)	April 1956	April 2, 1976	SD9E	EF618E-1	Tillamook Air Museum in Tillamook, Oregon	October 2010	Poor condition and shutdown of the POTB		
	4432	Electro-Motive Division (EMD)	April 1955	November 23, 1977	SD9E	EF618R-1	Tillamook Air Museum in Tillamook, Oregon	October 2010	Poor condition and shutdown of the POTB		
	4303	Electro-Motive Division (EMD)	April 1954	August 31, 1970	SD9E	EF618E-1	Stored at the Nevada Northern Railway Museum in Ely, Nevada	2011	Cannibalized for spare parts for #4426 (now NNRY #250)		
	7525	Electro-Motive Division (EMD)	March 1969	October 1984	SD45R	EF632LR-1/EF632LR-2	Reading Blue Mountain and Northern Railroad	November 2011	Poor mechanical shape	Reading Blue Mountain and Northern #3200	
	1303	Electro-Motive Division (EMD)	June 1949	April 8, 1971	NW2E	ES410E-1	Galveston Railroad Museum, Galveston, Texas	2012	Severely water damaged by Hurricane Ike on September 13, 2008		
	3400	Electro-Motive Division (EMD)	May 1956	May 1, 1974	GP9E	EF418E-2	LaHarpe, Illinois	January 31, 2012	Poor condition		
	SSW 3809	Electro-Motive Division (EMD)	March 1975	March 1975	GP9E	EF418CE-3	LaHarpe, Illinois	January 31, 2012	Poor condition		
	4450	Electro-Motive Division (EMD)	April 1954	November 23, 1973	SD9E	EF618E-2	Western Pacific Railroad Museum, Portola, California	August 20, 2013	Poor condition and lack of alignment control couplers.	Nicknamed "Huff"	
	4427	Electro-Motive Division (EMD)	April 1955	June 9, 1977	SD9E	EF618R-1	Dakota Southern Railway (DSRC) in Chamberlain, South Dakota	December 2023	-	Dakota Southern #4427	
	2872	Electro-Motive Division (EMD)	April 1959	April 1977	GP9R	ES418R-4	North Coast Railroad's "Balloon track" in Eureka, California	September 2024	Poor condition and negligence by BUGX		
	3779	Electro-Motive Division (EMD)	March 1957	September 1975	GP9E	EF418E-3	North Coast Railroad's "Balloon track" in Eureka, California	September 2024	Poor condition and negligence by BUGX		
	3857	Electro-Motive Division (EMD)	April 1959	October 1977	GP9R	EF418R-4	North Coast Railroad's "Balloon track" in Eureka, California	September 2024	Poor condition and negligence by BUGX		
