= Himmel Park =

Park in Pima County, Tucson, Arizona

- Interactive map of Himmel Park
- Type: City park
- Location: 1000 North Tucson Boulevard, Tucson, Arizona, 85716, United States
- Coordinates: 32°14′01″N 110°56′01″WGNIS data
- Area: 24.3 acres (9.8 ha)
- Created: 1935
- Operator: Tucson Parks and Recreation

Himmel Park is a 24.3-acre (9.8 ha) urban park in central Tucson, Arizona. The park's facilities include the Himmel Park Branch Library, a grass amphitheater, two playgrounds, a swimming pool, eight lighted tennis courts, and a multipurpose grass playing field area large enough to accommodate four full-size soccer fields.

The park is three blocks from east to west by two-and-a-half blocks from north to south. It is bounded by Tucson Boulevard to the west, 1st Street to the north, and Treat Avenue to the east. Its southern boundary is a half-block north of 3rd Street.

== History ==
Land for the park was sold to the City of Tucson in 1935 by Alvina Himmel Edmonson for $3,500 with the agreement that the park be named after her parents. In 1936 a pool was built by the Works Progress Administration. In 1944 the park roughly doubled in area with the purchase of three additional city blocks. Himmel Park Branch Library, Tucson Public Library's first branch location, was built in 1961 in the park's northeast corner. From 1962 until 2000 the Southern Pacific 1673 steam locomotive was displayed south of the WPA pool and east of the main playground area before being moved to its present location at the Southern Arizona Transportation Museum in downtown Tucson.
