= Southern Pacific 1293 =

Preserved SP S-14 class 0-6-0 locomotive

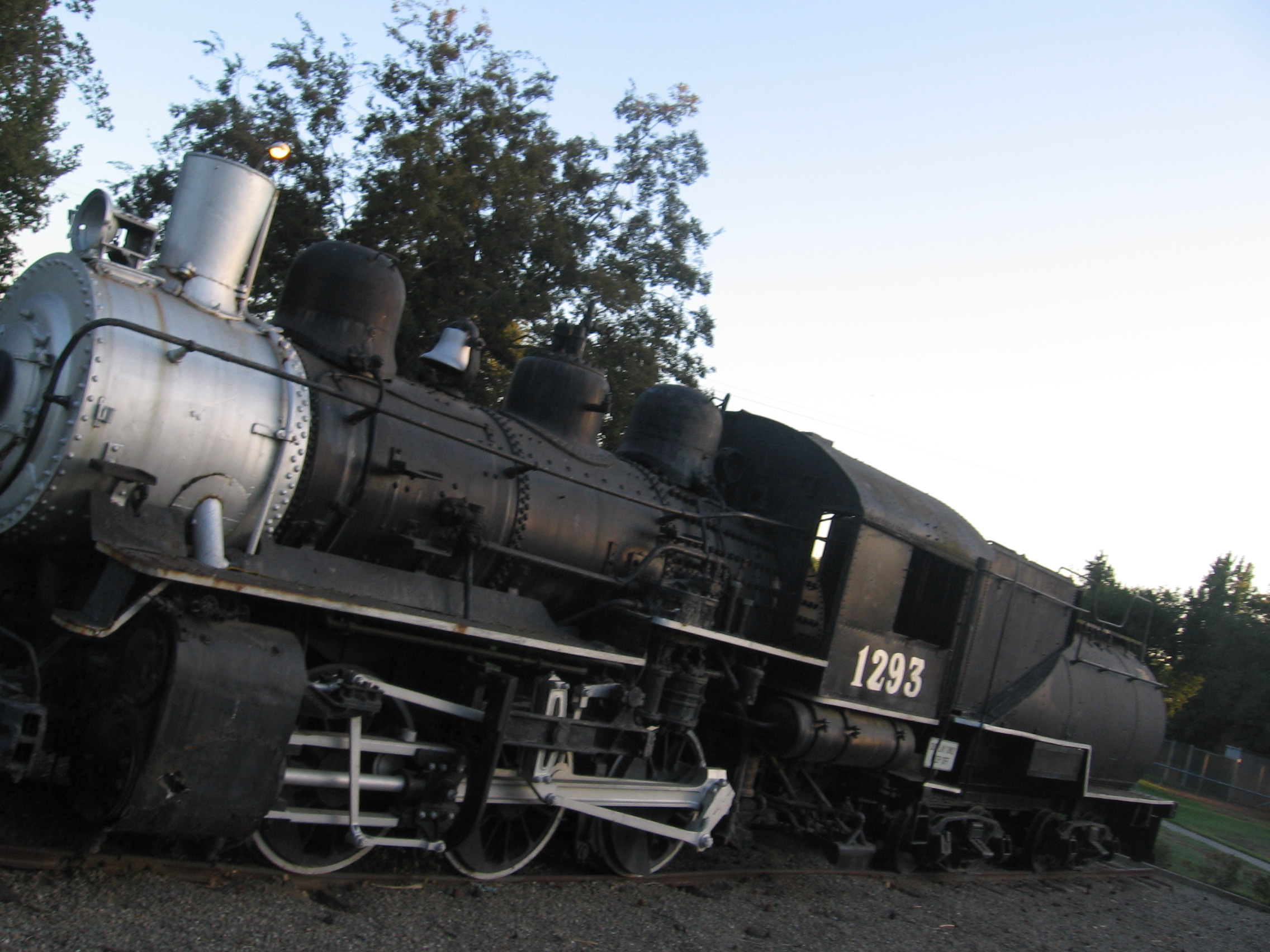
Type and origin
- Power type: Steam
- Builder: Lima Locomotive Works
- Serial number: 6761
- Build date: April 1924
Specifications
- Configuration
  - Whyte: 0-6-0
- Gauge: 4 ft 8 1/2 in (1,435 mm)
- Driver dia.: 57 in (1,400 mm)
- Adhesive weight: 155,000 lb (70,000 kg)
- Fuel type: Coal
- Boiler pressure: 200 psi
- Cylinders: Two, outside
- Cylinder size: 20 in × 26 in (510 mm × 660 mm)
Performance figures
- Tractive effort: 31,020 lbf
Career
- Operators: Southern Pacific Lines
- Class: S-14
- First run: June 5, 1924
- Retired: 1957
- Disposition: On static display
- Source for technical specifications

Southern Pacific 1293 is an S-14 class 0-6-0 "Switcher" type steam locomotive built by Lima Locomotive Works. It was dedicated to the City of Tracy, California, on August 8, 1958, by the Southern Pacific Railroad Company (now Union Pacific Railroad).

== Current status ==
After Southern Pacific retired 1293 in 1957, SP donated the locomotive for display in Dr. Powers Park in Tracy, California. It remains there to this day on static display, subject to deterioration caused by vandalism and exposure to weather.

== See also ==
- List of preserved Southern Pacific Railroad rolling stock
- Southern Pacific 1215
