= Southern Pacific 2706 =

Preserved SP C-8 class 2-8-0 locomotive

Coordinates: 39.213063°N 122.021405°W

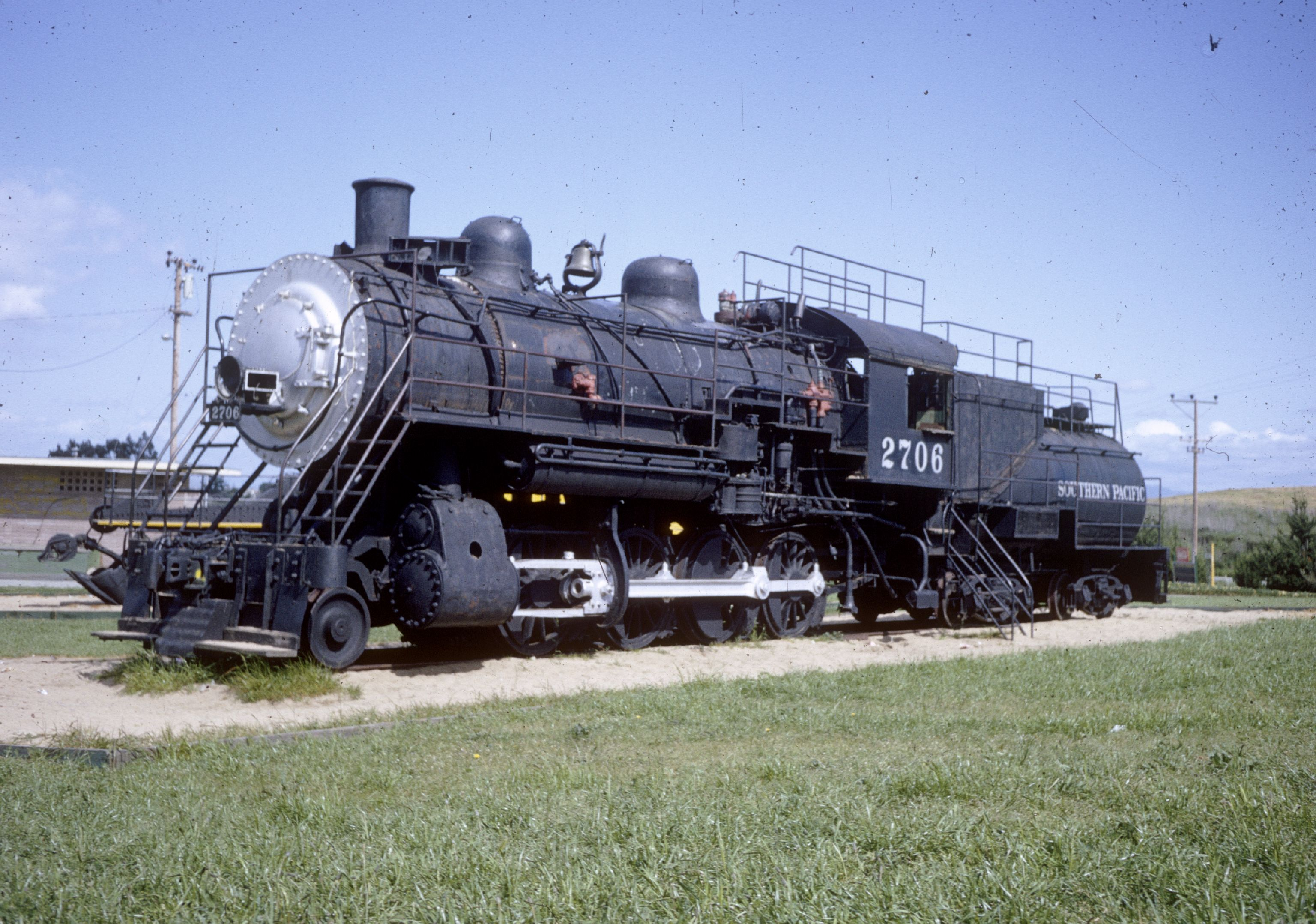
Type and origin
- Power type: Steam
- Builder: Baldwin Locomotive Works
- Serial number: 23809
- Build date: 02/1904
Specifications
- Configuration
  - Whyte: 2-8-0
- Gauge: 4 ft 8 1/2 in (1,435 mm) standard gauge
- Driver dia.: 57 in (1,448 mm)
- Adhesive weight: 191,900 lb (87,000 kg)
- Loco weight: 216,000 lb (98,000 kg)
- Fuel type: Bunker oil
- Cylinders: Two, outside
- Cylinder size: 22 in × 30 in (559 mm × 762 mm) dia × stroke
Performance figures
- Tractive effort: 45,470 lbf (202,300 N)
Career
- Operators: Southern Pacific
- Class: C-8
- Number in class: 58
- Numbers: SP 2706
- First run: 1904
- Retired: 1958
- Current owner: Colusa Steam in Colusa, California
- Disposition: On static display, awaiting restoration

Southern Pacific 2706 is a C-8 class 2-8-0 "Consolidation" type steam locomotive built by the Baldwin Locomotive Works in 1904 for the Southern Pacific Transportation Company (SP). It is one of three surviving members of its class, and one of many preserved SP 2-8-0s.

== History ==
Number 2706 was retired along with the remaining Southern Pacific steam fleet in the late 1950s at the Bayshore Yard near Brisbane, California. After retirement, it was moved to Watsonville in 1962, and it was purchased by Rick Hammond and the Eccles & Eastern Railroad Company. It was moved to Santa Cruz on the day of the 1989 Loma Prieta earthquake, where it was purchased by John Manley in 1999 (from Mike Hart) and subsequently moved to Colusa in 2007. Manley had worked on SP 2467.

A new shop was constructed in 2012 to accommodate work on 2706.

== See also ==
- Southern Pacific 2718
- Southern Pacific 2579 - a similar locomotive.
