= Southern Pacific 1237 =

Preserved SP S-10 class 0-6-0 locomotive

Type and origin
- Power type: Steam
- Builder: Baldwin Locomotive Works
- Serial number: 49245
- Build date: July 1918
Specifications
- Configuration
  - Whyte: 0-6-0
- Gauge: 4 ft 8 1/2 in (1,435 mm)
- Driver dia.: 52 in (1,321 mm)
- Fuel type: Oil
- Cylinders: Two, outside
Career
- Operators: Southern Pacific Railroad
- Class: S-10
- Numbers: SP 1237
- First run: August 31, 1918
- Retired: August 23, 1956
- Disposition: On static display

Southern Pacific 1237 is an S-10 class 0-6-0 steam locomotive built by Baldwin Locomotive Works. The locomotive was put in service August 31, 1918, and retired August 19, 1956, it was donated to the City of Salinas, California by the Southern Pacific Railroad, in the summer of 1957. 1237 is an oil fired yard switcher.

== Current status ==
The locomotive is stationed east of Amtrak Depot in Salinas, California. The Monterey and Salinas Valley Railroad Club cares for the locomotive and has done a static restoration of it.

== See also ==
- List of preserved Southern Pacific Railroad rolling stock
- Southern Pacific 1215
