= Modoc County Historical Museum =

- Location within California Location within the United States
- Location: Alturas, California, United States
- Coordinates: 41.4795°N 120.542°W
- Type: History museum
- Collections: Modoc County history Native American; United States military
- Founders: Marc and Myrtle Bellis

The Modoc County Historical Museum is a history museum located in Alturas, California, in the United States. The museum's exhibitions focus on the history of Modoc County beginning with Native American history and objects. The museum also has a collection of firearms from 15th century up to World War II. Outside the museum is Southern Pacific 2718, a steam locomotive that was used in the area.

== History ==
The main collection base for the museum was started in 1926 by Marc and Myrtle Bellis from Alturas. They first started collecting Native American and pioneer objects, and photographs and papers. They bought the gun collection of Nathan Rogers in 1932, a collection which stems back to 1870. The couple had a private museum in their attic. In 1966 the collection was purchased by a group of businessmen from Alturas. They hoped to open a museum, and in 1967 Modoc County bought the collection. The collection was located at the Veterans Memorial Building at Rachael Dorris Park. In 1968 it opened to the public. An expansion took place in 1984.

== Collections and exhibitions ==
The Modoc County Historical Museum has one of the largest collections of firearms in California. Early guns include a 15th-century blunderbuss. Exhibitions touch on the migratory bird hunting history of the region and showcases 10-gauge shotguns and a large three-gauge shotgun. A Marlin Ballard 40-90 caliber with a cartridge approximately 4 inches long. The museums collection of Native American objects is larger than its firearm collection. It has objects as old as 8,000 years old. The collection showcases the lives and history of three regional communities: the Pit River Tribe, the Modoc, and Paiute people. Other parts of the collection include objects from other Indigenous peoples of the Great Basin.

The museum also has a small collection of United States military objects including items from the United States Cavalry, World War I and World War II. Another small collection consists of various colored glass jars and bottles used in World War I, made from selenium owing to glass shortages in Europe. The museum also has railroad clocks, an Estey Organ, pipes and lighters, an iron lung, woodworking tools, cattle brands, Chinese bottles, clothing and animal skins.
