= Moore Park (Oregon) =

Park in Oregon, United States

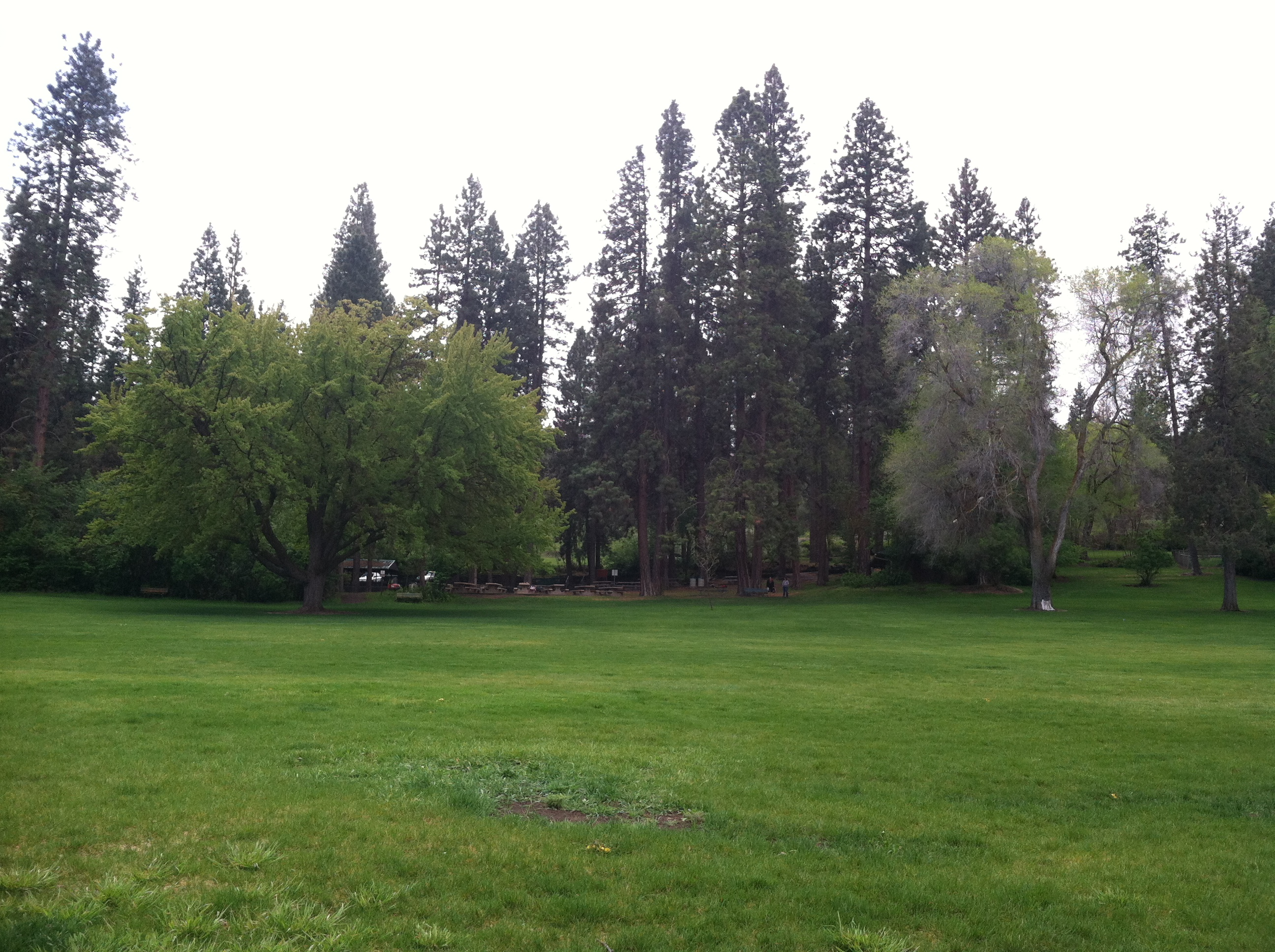
- One of the soccer fields and picnic areas within Moore Park, Klamath Falls, Oregon
- Interactive map of Moore Park
- Location: Klamath Falls, Oregon, United States
- Coordinates: 42.2336°N 121.8090°W
- Area: 458 acres (185 ha; 0.716 sq mi)
- Open: Dawn to dusk, daily, year round

Moore Park is a municipal park in Klamath Falls, Oregon, United States. It is located along a section of the south end of the Upper Klamath Lake. Because almost all the fishing on the Klamath Lake requires a boat, with the exception of a few springtime bank fisheries, paved boat ramps at Moore Park are popular access points to the Lake for fishing.

== Location ==
Moore Park is adjacent to Putnam's Point at the north end of the Link River Trail and is approximately 15 miles (24 km) from the southern end of downtown Klamath Falls. Access is permitted through U.S. Route 97 and U.S. Route 140. Moore Park has boat access to Upper Klamath Lake. Especially popular is Howard Bay ramp along the west shore of the lake.

== Activities and amenities ==
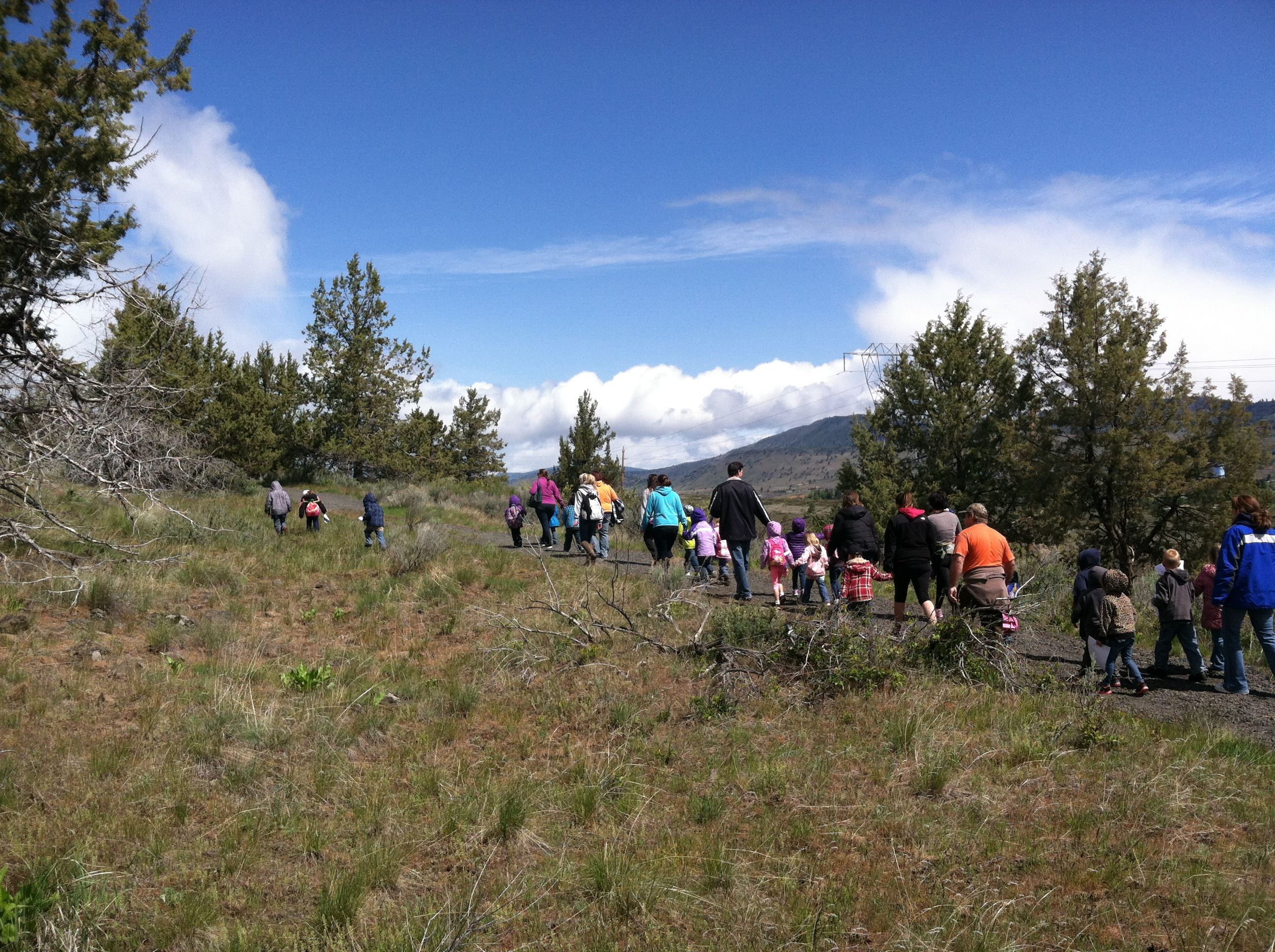
Field trip on one of the mountain trails on Moore Park

Park amenities include a boat launch for canoeing, and fishing on the west side of the park across Lakeshore Drive, with paved ramps, restrooms, and docks. Moore Park also has soccer fields, tennis courts, open play areas, large picnic areas with barbecue pits, day camp areas, an extensive hiking and mountain biking trail system, and the Gingerbread House. The access road to the north has been closed permanently to automobiles and is used as a trail.

== Fauna ==
The Klamath Basin is one of the most important staging areas for migrant waterfowl in the United States. The upland slopes of Moore Park provide viewing of many species of migrant and nesting forest birds, including bald eagles. From the hills and the shore areas of Moore Park, including Putnam Point, black-crowned night herons, Clark's and western grebes are frequently spotted, as well as snowy egrets, green herons, Barrow's goldeneyes, hooded merganser and tree swallows. Several species of warblers can be seen during the spring, including: yellow-rumped, yellow, Wilson's and orange-crowned warblers.

Ground squirrels and yellow-bellied marmots are most commonly seen in the summer close to rocky habitats of Moore Park.

== Flora ==
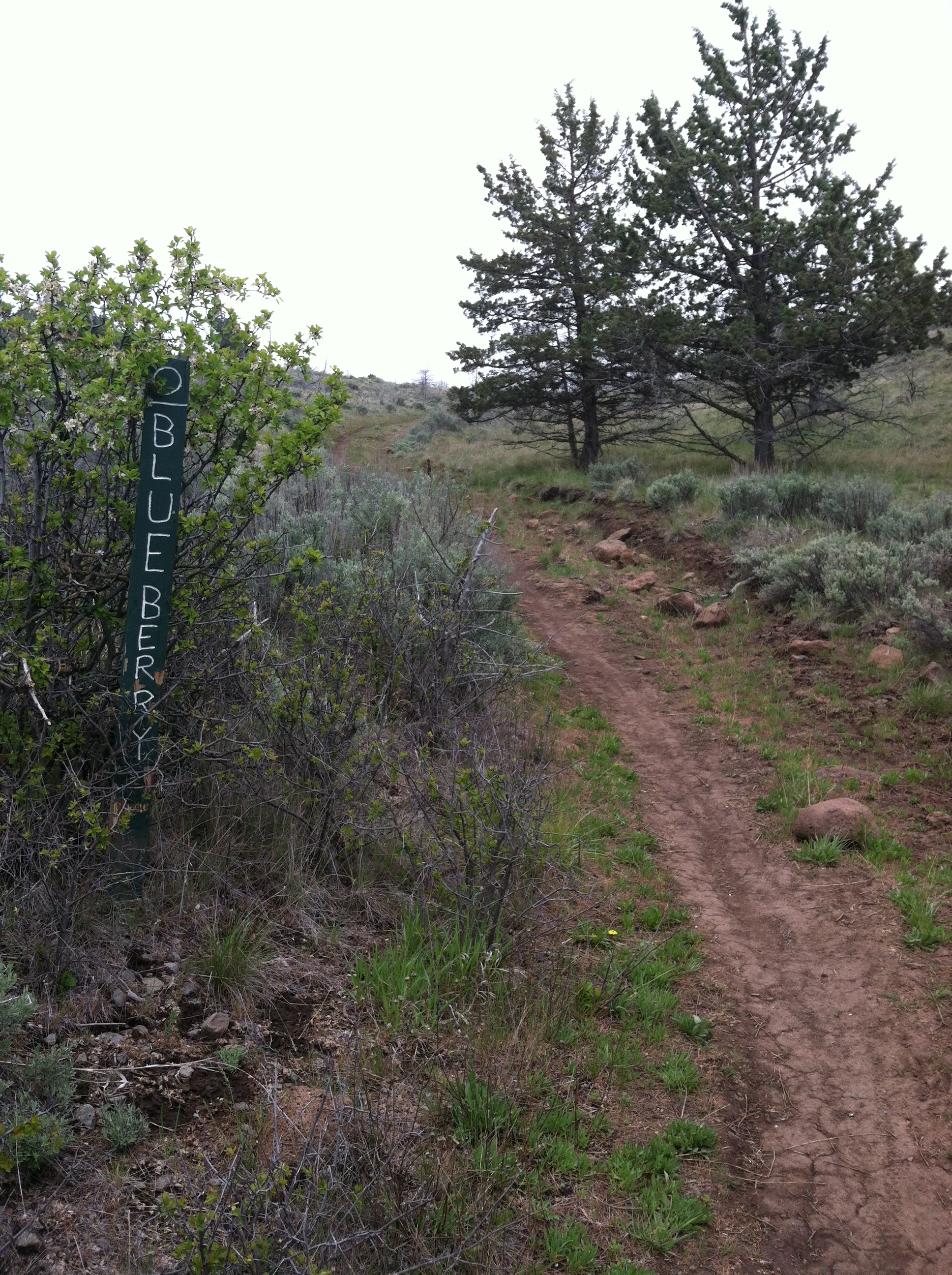
Trail pathway in sage habitat and junipers further back

Moore Park has 458 acres (185 ha; 0.716 sq mi) surrounded by grassy parkland sloping down to the lake from the roads on the south and east, and also habitats that range from juniper and sage steppe to dense pine forests. The overwhelming majority of the forests in Moore Park are Juniper woodland, primarily western juniper. Juniper has adapted to survive even under extreme dry conditions, which has led to its dominating sites by out-competing other vegetation. Fire suppression in the Klamath Basin has permitted western juniper species to expand rapidly into adjacent plant communities. To allow for plant diversity in Moore Park, juniper woodlands are thinned by land managers. Sagebrush, Klamath plum, and bitterbrush predominate in the sage steppe.

== See also ==
- List of parks in Klamath Falls, Oregon
