= Southern Pacific 1673 =

Preserved SP M-4 class 2-6-0 locomotive

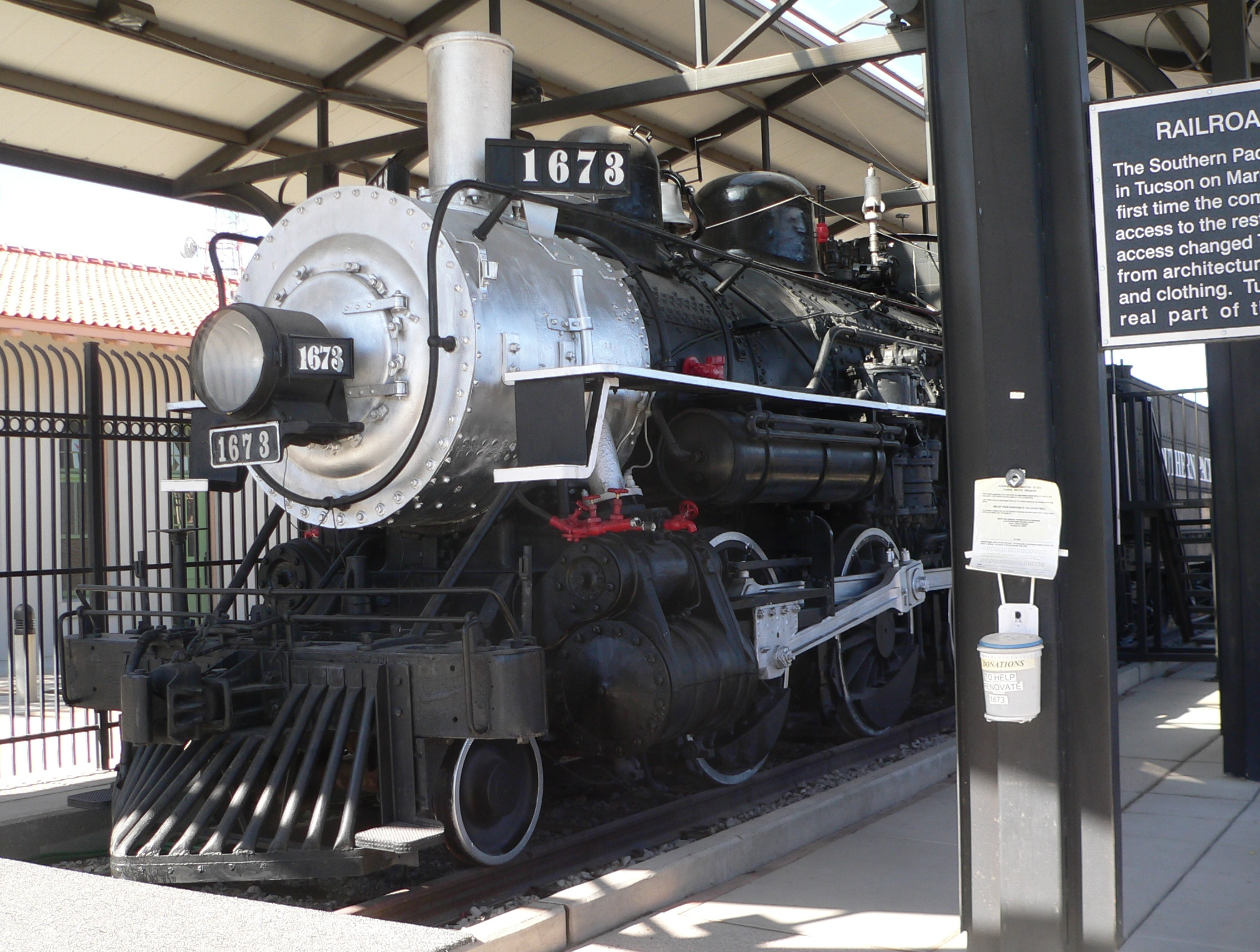
- No. 1673 on display at the Southern Arizona Transportation Museum on February 10, 2012
Type and origin
- Power type: Steam
- Builder: American Locomotive Company (Schenectady Works)
- Serial number: 5683
- Build date: 1900
- Total produced: 153
- Rebuild date: 1905
Specifications
- Configuration
  - Whyte: 2-6-0
- Gauge: 4 ft 8 1/2 in (1,435 mm)
- Driver dia.: 63 in (160 cm)
- Adhesive weight: 134,600 lb (61 t)
- Loco weight: 157,900 lb (72 t)
- Fuel type: New: Coal; Now: Oil
- Boiler pressure: 190 psi (1.3 MPa)
- Heating surface
  - Firebox: 156 sq ft (14 m^{2})
  - Tubes and flues: 1,350 sq ft (125 m^{2})
  - Total surface: 1,506 sq ft (140 m^{2})
- Superheater
  - Heating area: 269 sq ft (25 m^{2})
- Cylinders: Two, outside
- Cylinder size: 20 in × 28 in (508 mm × 711 mm)
- Valve gear: Stephenson
Performance figures
- Tractive effort: 28,710 lbf (128 kN)
Career
- Operators: Southern Pacific Lines
- Class: M-4
- Numbers: SP 1673
- Delivered: November 1900
- First run: 1901
- Last run: 1965
- Retired: 1955
- Preserved: June 1955
- Restored: 1994 (cosmetically)
- Current owner: Southern Arizona Transportation Museum
- Disposition: On static display
- Southern Pacific Railroad Locomotive No. 1673
- U.S. National Register of Historic Places
- Location within Arizona Location within the United States
- Location: Southern Pacific Depot, Tucson, Arizona
- Coordinates: 32°13′23″N 110°58′0″W
- Area: less than one acre
- Built: 1900
- Architect: Schenectady Locomotive Works
- Architectural style: Mogul 2-6-0
- NRHP reference No.: 91001918
- Added to NRHP: January 9, 1992

Southern Pacific 1673 is an M-4 class 2-6-0 "Mogul" type steam locomotive, built in 1900 by the Schenectady Locomotive Works; the engine was delivered in November of that year, and by early 1901 it was based in Tucson, Arizona and operated primarily in southern Arizona hauling freight trains.

== Revenue service ==
From 1901 to the 1940s, No. 1673 logged over a million miles in service, primarily operating out of Tucson where it hauled freight trains on several short line routes in southern Arizona, occasionally traveling as far south as Nogales, Arizona, and as far west as Yuma. Other destinations included Benson, Patagonia, Elgin, Fort Huachuca, and Tombstone.

No. 1673 also underwent several major overhauls and alterations during this time. In 1905, the engine was converted from using coal to oil. By 1922, the locomotive was taken out of service once again for a major rebuilding in the Sacramento, California, shops that saw the installation of a superheater in its smokebox, which in turn necessitated the conversion of the engine from using slide valves to piston valves.

By the early 1950s, No. 1673 was relegated to yard work as a switcher, its Vanderbilt tender replaced by a smaller squarebox tender, and even then it was seldom made use of as time went by and diesel locomotives began to supersede steam powered ones. It had a brief starring role in the 1955 film Oklahoma, for which it was fitted with a diamond stack and other turn of the century equipment and colors. By 1955, it was seeing little use, mostly sitting in serviceable storage until March 18 when the engine was used for a few days for a publicity photo shoot in Sahuarita, Arizona. Two days later, it was also the star of Southern Pacific's 75th anniversary in Tucson, Arizona, during which the locomotive pulled an excursion train from the Southern Pacific Depot to the Pacific Fruit Express yard all day long, after which the railroad presented the locomotive to the city.

== Display at historical society and Himmel Park ==
Shortly afterwards, the engine was placed on display in front of the then Pioneers Historical Society in June 1955 (later the Arizona Historical Society). The locomotive was in excellent condition and still operable when donated to the city. In 1962, the locomotive had to be moved to a display location at Himmel Park in Tucson due to construction at the Historical Society to expand the size of its buildings, which left no room for the engine. The engine sat for many years there at the park, exposed to the elements and gradually deteriorating, as well as suffering periodic vandalism and theft of equipment, including its builder's plates and gauges. Various proposals to move the locomotive to other locations, or to refurbish it, were put forth, but little progress was made. During one abortive attempt in 1965, the locomotive was steamed up to clear out the whistle, and run a short distance on the display track at Himmel Park. No. 1673 was slightly damaged when it ran off its track, but a volunteer derailing crew had the engine back up and repaired in a year.

In 1984, a group of Tucson businessmen spent approximately $20,000 to perform a hydrostatic boiler inspection in anticipation of using the locomotive in public excursion service between Tucson and Nogales, Arizona. Although it was determined that restoration to operational condition was feasible, the project was abandoned due to the higher than expected costs related to repairing or replacing its boiler.

By the early 1990s, the engine was in bad shape. It had deteriorated to the point that many local residents thought the engine would be scrapped. The 1673 Task Force was formed by a group of residents to preserve the engine from its neglect. In 1992, the locomotive was added to the National Register of Historic Places as Southern Pacific Railroad Locomotive No. 1673. By 1994, the engine had been taken apart, sandblasted, cosmetically restored, and reassembled. The engine now appears close to its appearance in 1955 when it was donated to the people of Tucson.

== Display at the historic depot ==
In December 2000, the engine was moved out of the park to the Southern Pacific Depot in downtown Tucson, and over the next two years a shelter and security fence were erected around it. The work was completed and a dedication ceremony was conducted in September 2002. By March 20, 2005, the locomotive was open once again to public display upon completion of the depot's restoration.

== Disposition ==
As of January 2011, the Southern Arizona Transportation Museum began an effort to further repair and preserve No. 1673, starting with a modification of the engine's paint scheme to more accurately reflect how it appeared in the early to mid-1950s. This presently involves painting parts such as the injectors and check valves red in keeping with Southern Pacific practice, as well giving other parts such as the smokebox, boiler, rods, and driver wheels new coats of black, white, and silver paint.

By summer of 2011, work was started on cleaning, relubricating, reassembling and reinstalling on the locomotive parts that were removed during the 1992–1994 restoration, but kept in storage for many years. Additionally, work is being done to prepare the cab shell for restoration of the interior wood wall paneling and deck planking. Other work includes finding or fabricating suitable replacements for parts lost, stolen, or badly damaged beyond repair over the many years No. 1673 was on display at prior locations.
