= List of parks in Klamath Falls, Oregon =

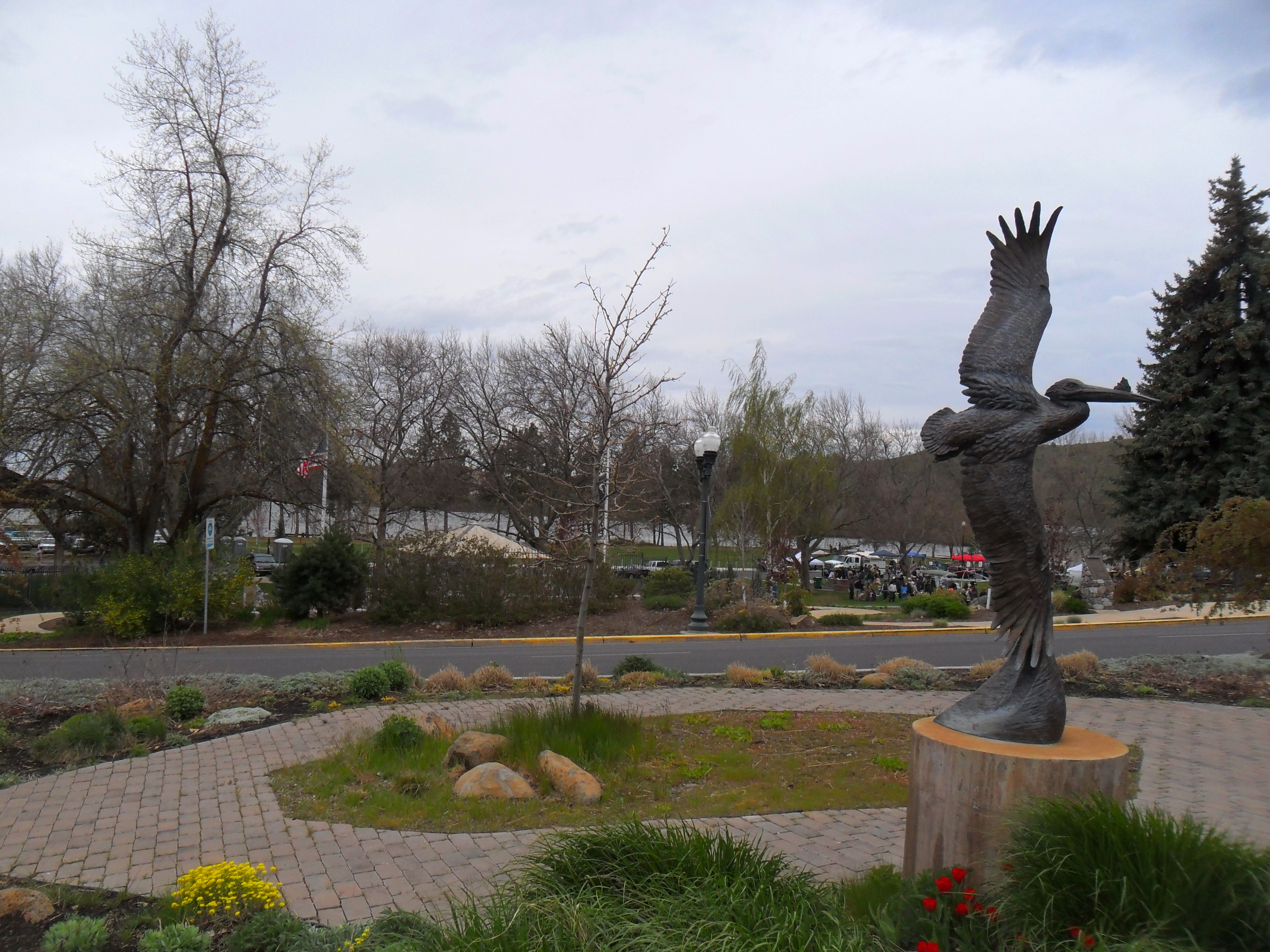
The Veterans Memorial Park in downtown Klamath Falls on the shore of Lake Ewauna.

Following is a list of parks, forests and nature preserves in the metropolitan area of Klamath Falls, Oregon:

== State Parks ==
- Collier Memorial State Park, features a campground and outdoor museum of historic logging equipment dating to the 1880s along the shores of the Williamson River.
- Fort Rock Cave, has served as a vital part of the Native American lifestyle.
- Jackson F. Kimball State Recreation Site, a pristine site located at the headwaters of the Wood River.
- OC&E Woods Line State Trail, Oregon's longest linear park, a 100-mile rail trail.

== City Parks system ==
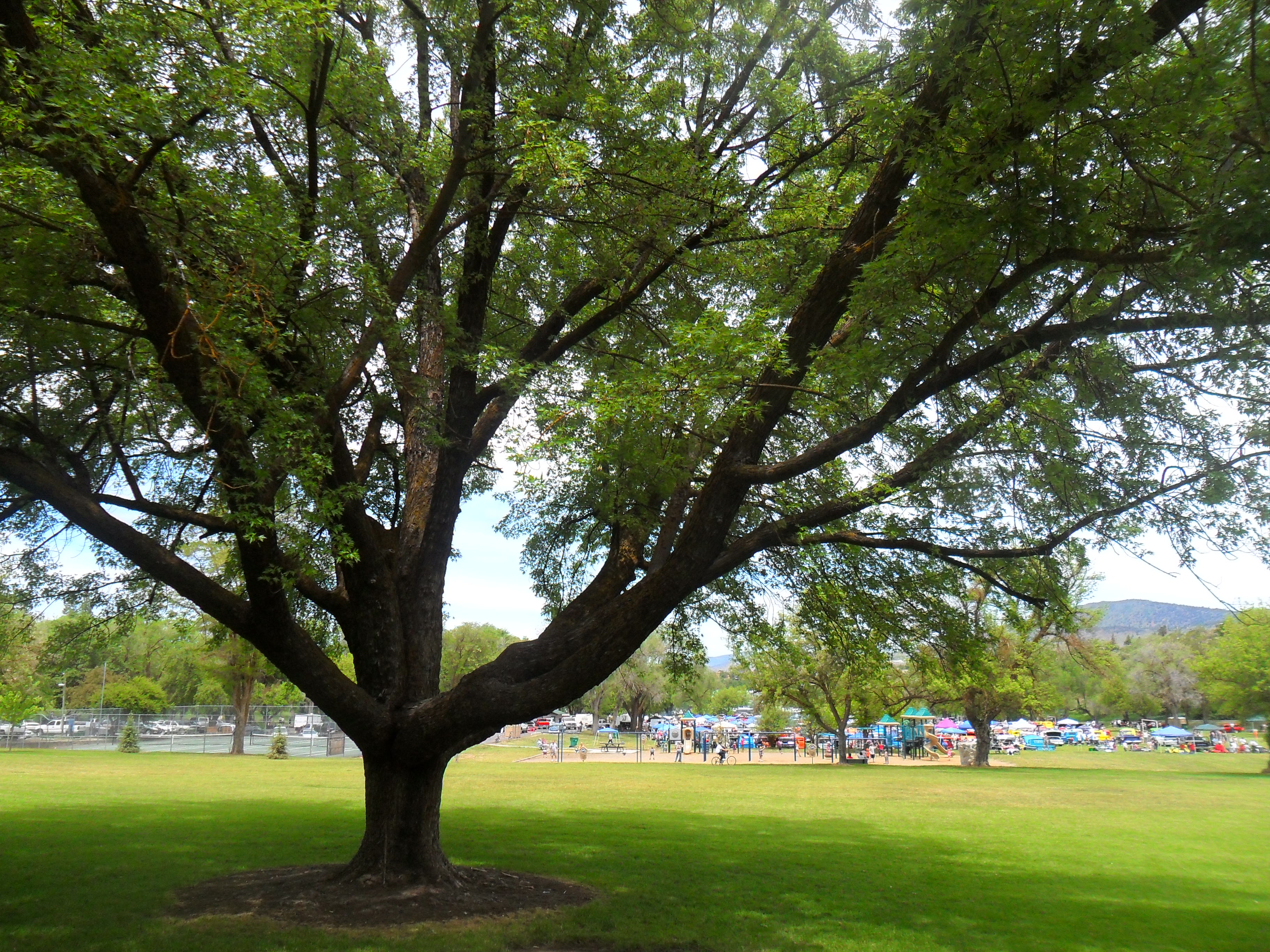
Soccer field and playground within Moore Park

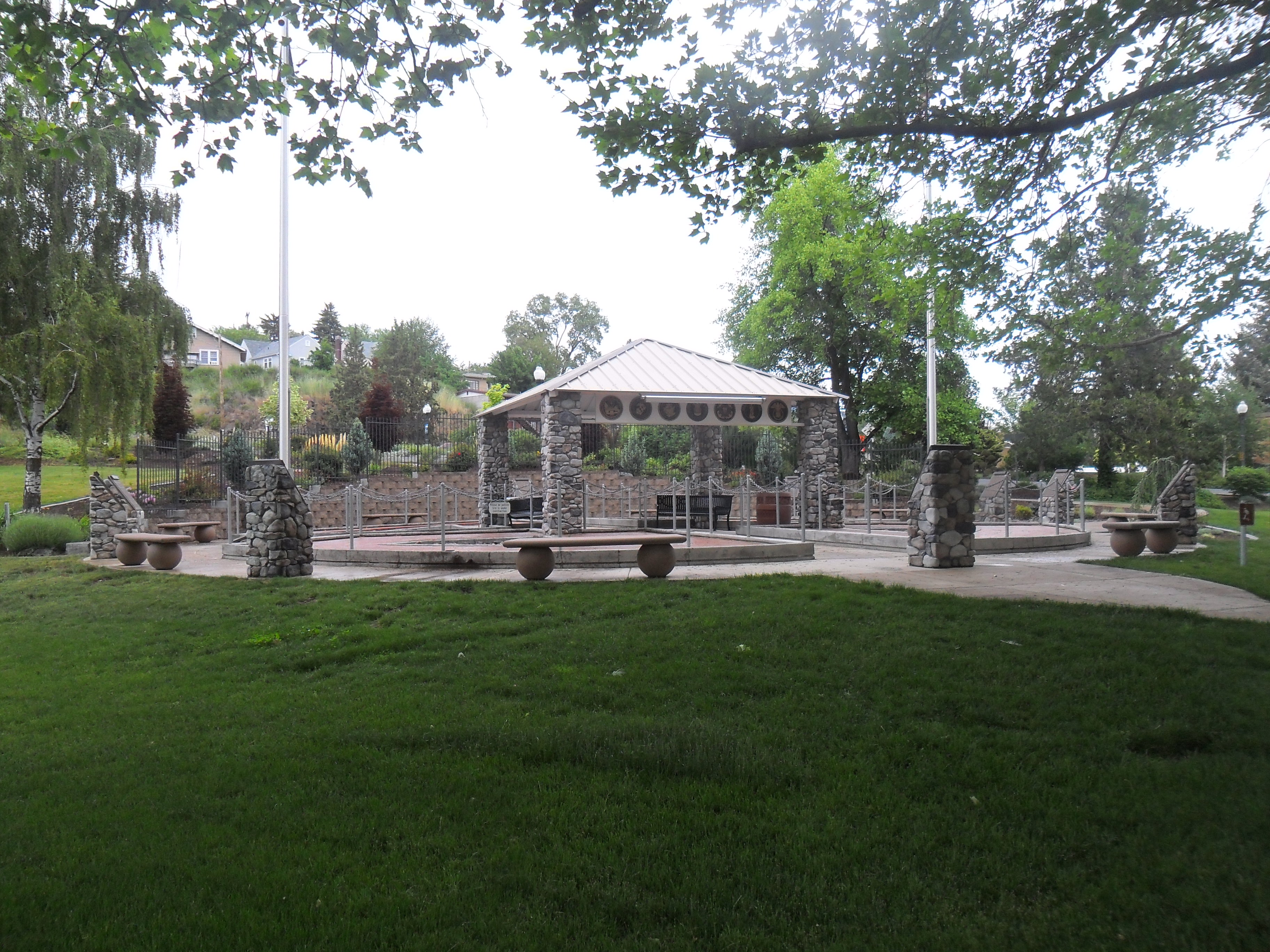
Memorial erected in Klamath Falls Veterans Memorial Park

- Moore Park and Moore Park Marinas, 458 acres on the south shore of Upper Klamath Lake.
- Kit Carson Park, 9.1 acres adjacent to Crater Lake Parkway, picnic, playground, baseball.
- Conger Heights Park, 10.6 acres leased to the Klamath Falls City School District.
- Ella Redkey pool, 2.4 acres, geothermically heated.
- Klamath Falls Veterans Memorial Park, 3.30 acres, downtown Klamath Falls.
- Mills-Kiwanis Park, 2.40 acres, basketball court, swings, scrimmage soccer field.
- Krause Park, 2.8 acre neighborhood park.
- Fairview Park, 3.10 acres primarily open space and a children's playground.
- Lynnewood Hills Open Area, 104 acres above Moore Park
- Conger Heights Open Area, 32.96 acres on east side of Link River in downtown Klamath Falls.
- Kiger Stadium, 7.1 acres, 5,000 seat wood stadium
- Putnam Landing Park, 2.56 acres on south shore of Upper Klamath and Link River.
- Southside Park, 13.4 acres in southern Klamath Falls
- Warford Park, 8.6 acres in western Klamath Falls, baseball, playground, picnic, trail
- Fairview Park, 3.1 acres with picnic, playground, athletic field
- Stukel Park, .7 acres with basketball, tennis court, playground
- Maple Park, 1 acre, south trailhead for Link River Canyon trail and home of Klamth Art Association.
- Henderson Park, .6 acre with athletic field and swings

== Wiard Memorial Park and Recreation District ==
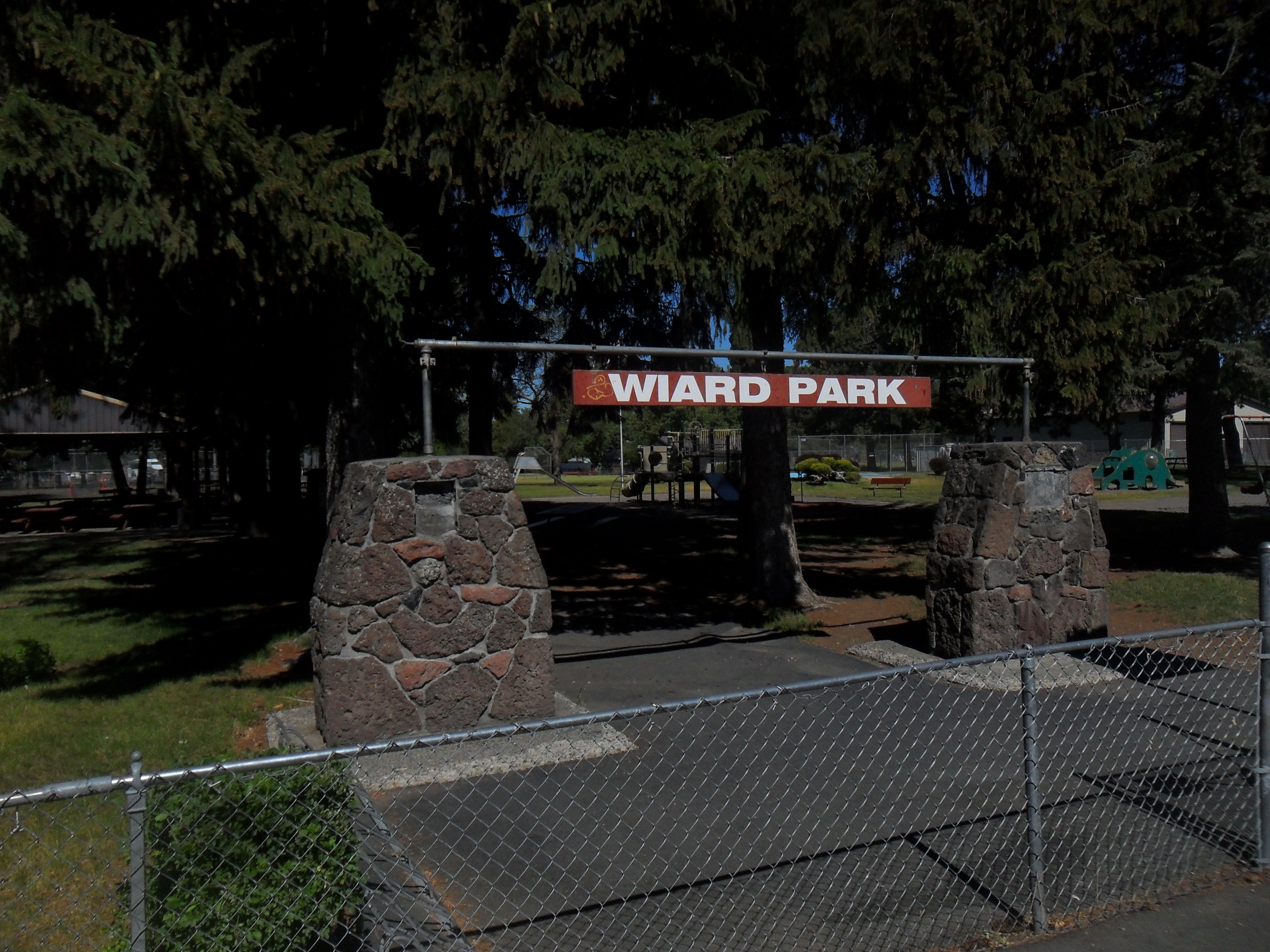
Entrance to Wiard Park, the largest park within the Wiard Memorial district, east Klamath Falls.

The Wiard Memorial Park and Recreation District in Klamath Falls is a taxing district that operates six parks and recreational facilities within the Klamath Falls metropolitan area.

- Wiard Park, the largest park in the Wiard Park District with just over 5 acres. Although built with a wading pool, it closed permanently on account of the water not circulating from the pool.
- Crest Park, open space of little over 3 acres. Sold to Wiard Park District in 1969 for $900.
- Keller Park, primarily open space with a playground, basketball and volleyball courts and a covered picnic area.
- Etna Park, named for the street it is located on, features primarily open space with a playground and picnic area since 1932.
- Alva Park, a small park named for the street it is located on, features half a basketball court, playground and picnic area, donated in 1949.
- Klein Park, located in the Casitas subdivision, features a playground and a basketball and volleyball courts.

== See also ==
- List of Oregon state parks
- Oregon State Parks and Recreation Department
