= Pacific Southwest Railway Museum Association =

Pacific Southwest Railway Museum Association, Inc.
- Founded: 16 April 1961
- Founder: Eric Sanders, et al.
- Type: Public-benefit corporation
- Tax ID no.: 95-2374478 (CA 501(c)(3))
- Purpose: Railroad museum, historic preservation
- Location(s): 750 Depot Street; Campo, CA (excursion station); 4695 Nebo Drive; La Mesa, CA 91941 (business office)
- Coordinates: 32°36′46″N 116°28′21″W
- Origins: San Diego County Railroad Museum
- Region served: San Diego County
- Website: www.psrm.org
- Formerly called: San Diego Railroad Museum

The Pacific Southwest Railway Museum Association (PSRMA) is a museum in San Diego, California of the railroad history of the pacific southwest region. Founded in 1961, the PSRMA has been providing visitors with the opportunity to experience the rich railroad history of California through interactive exhibits, and vintage train rides. It was originally named San Diego County Railway Museum and, from 1988 to 2000, as San Diego Railroad Museum.
