= Southern Pacific 2718 =

Preserved SP C-8 class 2-8-0 steam locomotive

Coordinates: 41.479781°N 120.541754°W

Type and origin
- Power type: Steam
- Builder: Baldwin Locomotive Works
- Serial number: 23890
- Build date: March 1904
Specifications
- Configuration
  - Whyte: 2-8-0
- Gauge: 4 ft 8 1/2 in (1,435 mm) standard gauge
- Driver dia.: 57 in (1,448 mm)
- Adhesive weight: 191,900 lb (87,000 kg)
- Loco weight: 216,700 lb (98,300 kg)
- Fuel type: Bunker oil
- Cylinders: Two, outside
- Cylinder size: 22 in × 30 in (559 mm × 762 mm) dia × strokel
- Valve type: Slide valve
- Loco brake: Air
- Train brakes: Air
- Couplers: Knuckle
Performance figures
- Tractive effort: 45,470 lbf (202,300 N)
Career
- Operators: Southern Pacific
- Class: C-8
- Number in class: 58
- Numbers: SP 2718
- First run: 1904
- Retired: 1956
- Current owner: Modoc County, California
- Disposition: On static display

Southern Pacific 2718 is a C-8 class 2-8-0 "Consolidation" type steam locomotive built by the Baldwin Locomotive Works in 1904 for the Southern Pacific Transportation Company (SP). It is one of three surviving members of its class, and one of many preserved SP 2-8-0s.

2718 spent its entire career working on the Southern Pacific for 52 years until November 1956, when it was retired and donated to Modoc County, California, where it is preserved on static display outdoors in Rachael Dorris Park, near the Modoc County Historical Museum in Alturas. While in service for the SP, 2718 was used on the route previously established by the Nevada–California–Oregon Railway (N.C.O.) between Alturas and Reno, Nevada, primarily pulling livestock freight trains, but also including passenger service between 1927 and 1938.

The "Consolidation" class is named for the merger of the Beaver Meadow, Penn Haven & White Haven, and Lehigh & Mahanoy railroads, which became the Lehigh Valley Railroad.

== See also ==
- Southern Pacific 2706
