= EMD GP9R =

Rebuilt diesel locomotives

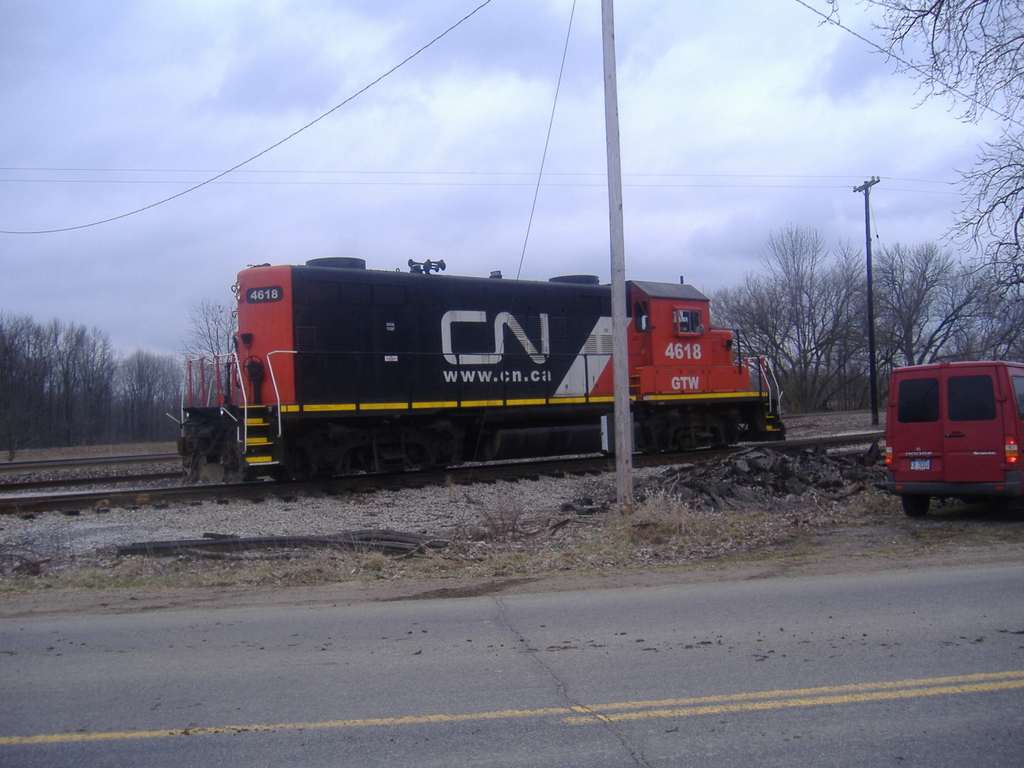
- Canadian National (ex-Grand Trunk Western) GP9R #4618
Type and origin
- Power type: Diesel-electric
- Builder: General Motors Electro-Motive Division (EMD)
- Model: GP9; GP9R
- Rebuild date: 1970 – 1993
Specifications
- Configuration
  - AAR: B-B
- Gauge: 4 ft 8 1/2 in (1,435 mm) standard gauge
- Trucks: EMD Blomberg B (Flexicoil on some CN units)
- Wheel diameter: 40 in (1.016 m)
- Minimum curve: 21° (273 ft (83.21 m) radius)
- Wheelbase: 40 ft (12.19 m)
- Length: 56 ft 2 in (17.12 m)
- Width: 10 ft 3 1/2 in (3.14 m)
- Height: 15 ft 1/2 in (4.58 m)
- Loco weight: 259,500 lb (117,700 kg)
- Fuel capacity: 1,100 US gal (4,200 L; 920 imp gal)
- Prime mover: EMD 16-567C
- RPM range: 835 max
- Engine type: V16 Two-stroke diesel
- Aspiration: Roots blower
- Displacement: 9,072 cu in (148.66 L)
- Generator: EMD D-12-B
- Traction motors: (4) EMD D-37-B
- Cylinders: 16
- Cylinder size: 8 1/2 in × 10 in (216 mm × 254 mm)
Performance figures
- Maximum speed: 65 mph (105 km/h)
- Power output: 1,750 hp (1.30 MW)
- Tractive effort: 64,750 lbf (288.0 kN)
Career
- Locale: North America

The EMD GP9R is a rebuild from EMD GP9 diesel locomotives that were rebuilt between 1970 - 1993 by the Chicago and North Western Transportation Company, Grand Trunk Western Railroad, Southern Pacific Transportation Company. Some of these units are still in service today.

== History ==
=== Chicago and North Western ===
The Chicago and North Western Transportation Company was willing to rebuild the majority of their older GP9 locomotives and thus had rebuilt a total of 71 units. Each being rebuilt in nine batches.

The first batch was rebuilt between November 1971 and October 1972, with the second batch being rebuilt between June 1972 and October 1973, the third batch being rebuilt between September 1972 and August 1978, the fourth batch being rebuilt in December 1973, the fifth batch being rebuilt between April 1977 and September 1977, the sixth batch being rebuilt between August 1977 and October 1977, the seventh batch being rebuilt between July 1978 and November 1980, and the ninth batch being rebuilt between July 1981 and August 1981.

=== Grand Trunk Western ===
The Grand Trunk Western Railroad (GTW) was studying options for a low-horsepower switcher locomotive that would replace their fleet of GP9 units. Following the ending of EMD’s GP15-1 program, and the lowest horsepower locomotive in EMD’s catalogue had concluded the 3,000hp GP59, which used a 710 prime mover.

The GTW decided to fully rebuild the GP9 units into their own GP9R units, specifically by upgrading the electrical systems, engine components, and cabs.

The units were rebuilt by the Grand Trunk Western at their own Battle Creek Shops between 1989 and 1993. The rebuilds had also included solid-state electrical systems, wheel slip control modules, AC generator systems, air and braking system updates, and structural improvements.

The original EMD 567 power assembly was replaced by 645 components for higher reliability and easier part access and the GP9Rs retained their 1,750 horsepower rating.

These units were numbered by the GTW as 4600 – 4611.

=== Southern Pacific ===
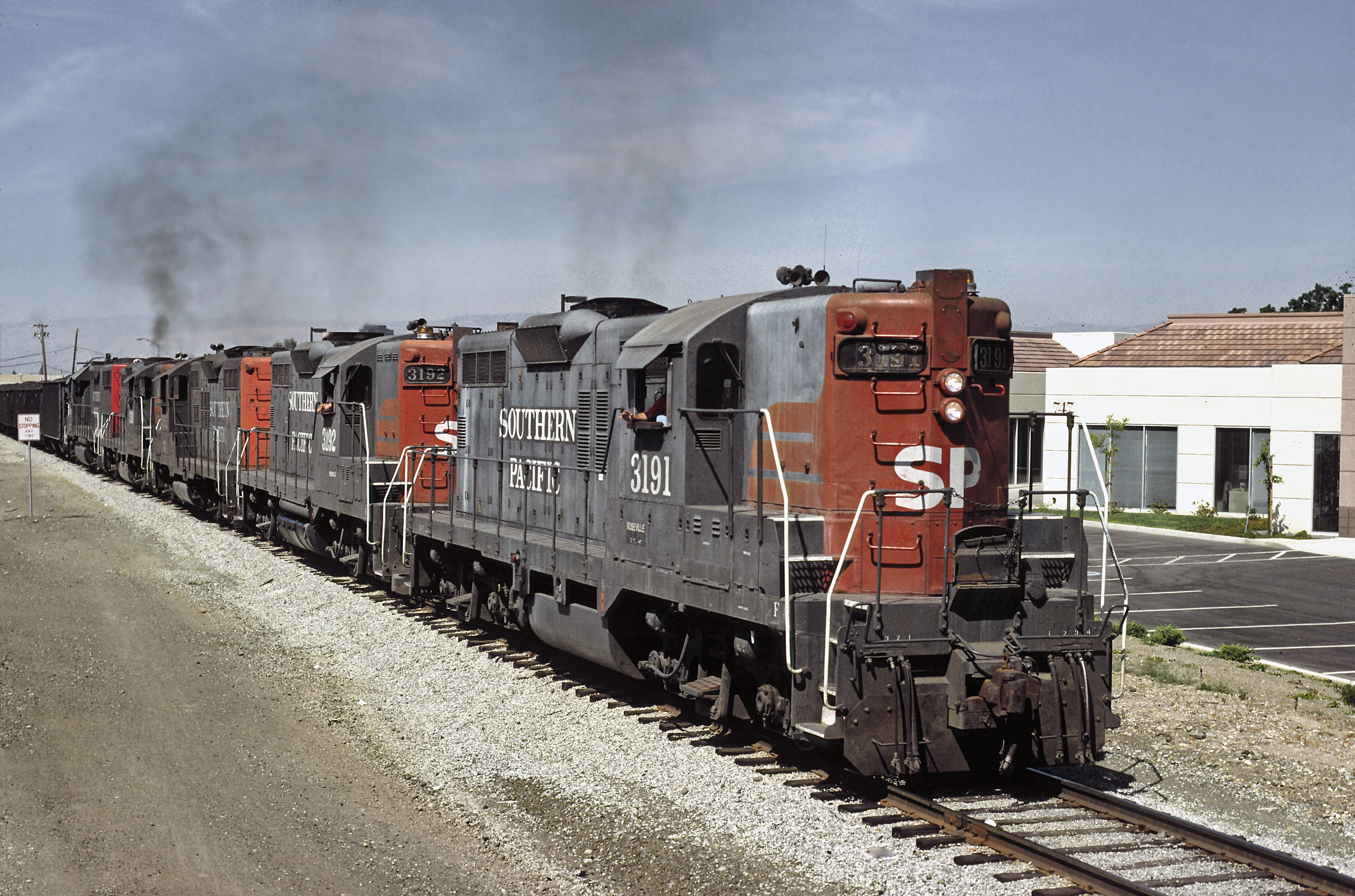
Southern Pacific GP9R #3191

Beginning in 1970 with SP GP9 #3424, all of the pre-existing EMD GP9 diesel locomotives that were on the St. Louis Southwestern Railway (also known as the "Cotton Belt Route") and Southern Pacific's roster were rebuilt into GP9E's and GP9R's with the number series beginning at #3100.

The Southern Pacific Transportation Company began rebuilding their units in 1970, while the St. Louis Southwestern Railway (also known as the "Cotton Belt Route") began rebuilding their units in 1974. Some of their units would be downgraded to switching duties and would do so until the Southern Pacific's merger into Union Pacific Railroad.

== Bibliography ==
- Strapac, Joseph A. (1974). Southern Pacific Motive Power Annual 1973. Chatham Publishing.
