= Klamath Falls Veterans Memorial Park =

City park in Oregon

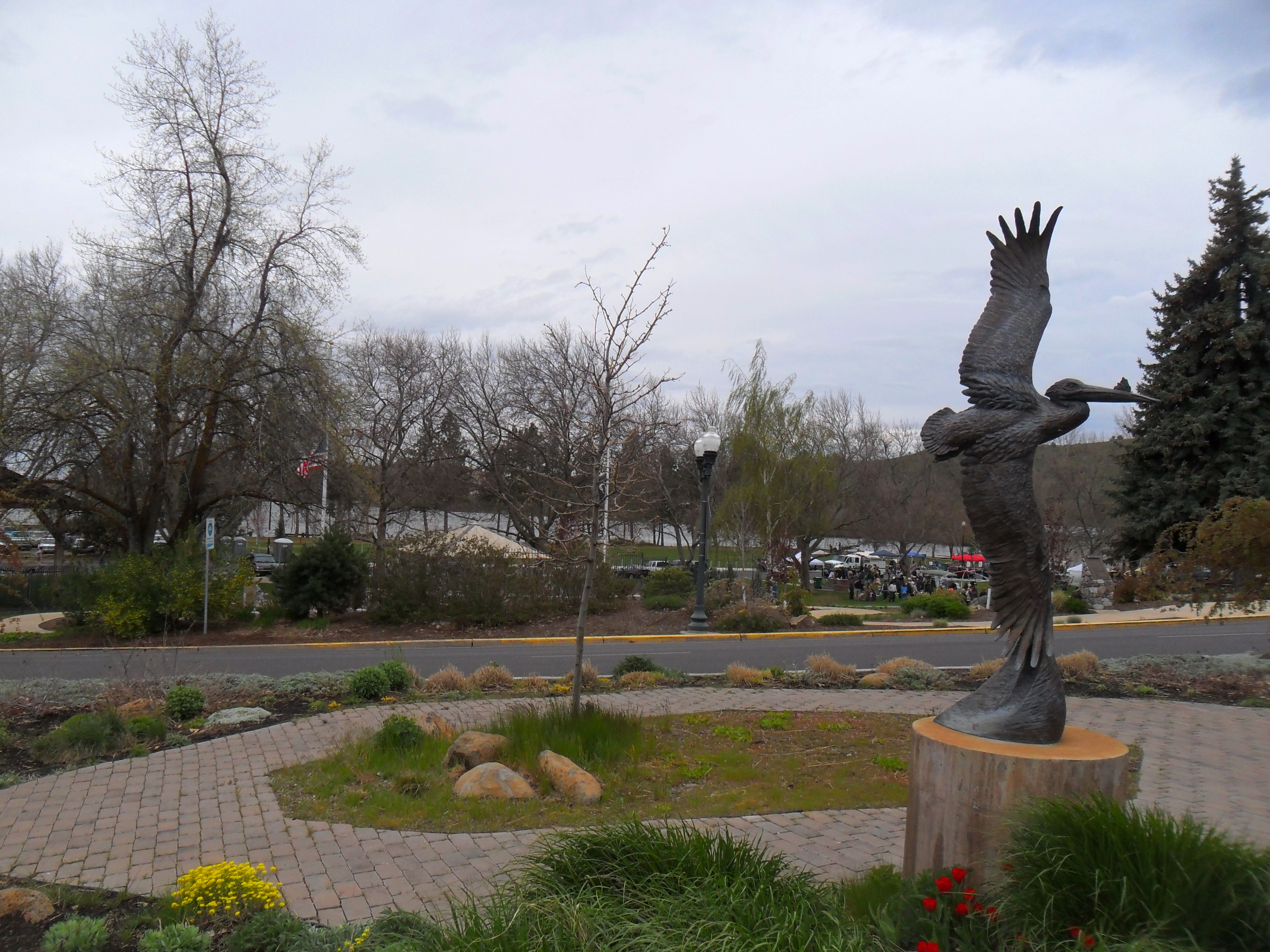
- The Veterans Memorial Park in downtown Klamath Falls on the shore of Lake Ewauna.
- Interactive map of Klamath Falls Veterans Memorial Park
- Location: Klamath Falls, Oregon
- Coordinates: 42°13′13″N 121°47′12″W
- Created: 2007
- Operator: City of Klamath Falls
- Open: Dawn to dusk, daily, year round

The Klamath Falls Veterans Memorial Park is a recreational park located on Lake Ewauna in downtown Klamath Falls, Oregon, US. It was established in 2007 as a memorial honoring those who have served and/or are serving in the U.S. Armed Forces, Coast Guard and Wartime Merchant Marine. Construction of the 3.30-acre (0 km^{2}) park was overseen by the 173d Fighter wing, Oregon Air National Guard located at Kingsley Field. The City of Klamath Falls oversees the maintenance of the Memorial. The park features memorial bricks for past and present military personnel, an informational kiosk, a covered pavilion and a display of Locomotive#2579 used by the Southern Pacific Railroad.

== Location ==
Klamath Falls Veterans Memorial Park is located where US Route 97 passes over the Link River, at the southern end of downtown Klamath Falls. Because of its location at the north end of the Klamath River, the park has boat access to Lake Ewauna.

== History ==
A volunteer committee was created to oversee the proposal, design and construction of a memorial park to honor veteran servicemen. The original project was designed to take place in multiple phases to include future expansion. With the assistance of the local military organizations and civilian clubs, the Oregon National Guard, the city and county of Klamath, as well as multiple donations of citizens, the first phase of Klamath Falls Veterans Memorial Park broke ground in August 2007 and was completed and dedicated three months later, on Veterans' Day, November 11, 2007. Phase 1 of construction included a covered pavilion and benches, flag poles, concrete walkways with red, white and blue fiber optic lights, bronze plaques representing the military branches, monuments depicting various wars, initial memorial brick pavers and landscaping.

A second phase dedicated on Memorial Day, 2008 included a Blue Star Memorial Highway marker, which pays tribute to all of the armed forces that have defended the United States. The second phase also included memorial brick pavers.

== Geothermal system ==
Because the City of Klamath Falls is located in a Known Geothermal Resource Area, all sidewalks and the memorial brick bases in the Veterans Memorial Park contain piping for a geothermal heating system. This natural heatsource allows the Memorial to provide direct geothermally heated snowmelt systems during the winter months.

== See also ==
- List of parks in Klamath Falls, Oregon
