= Southern Pacific 2579 =

Preserved SP C-9 class 2-8-0 locomotive

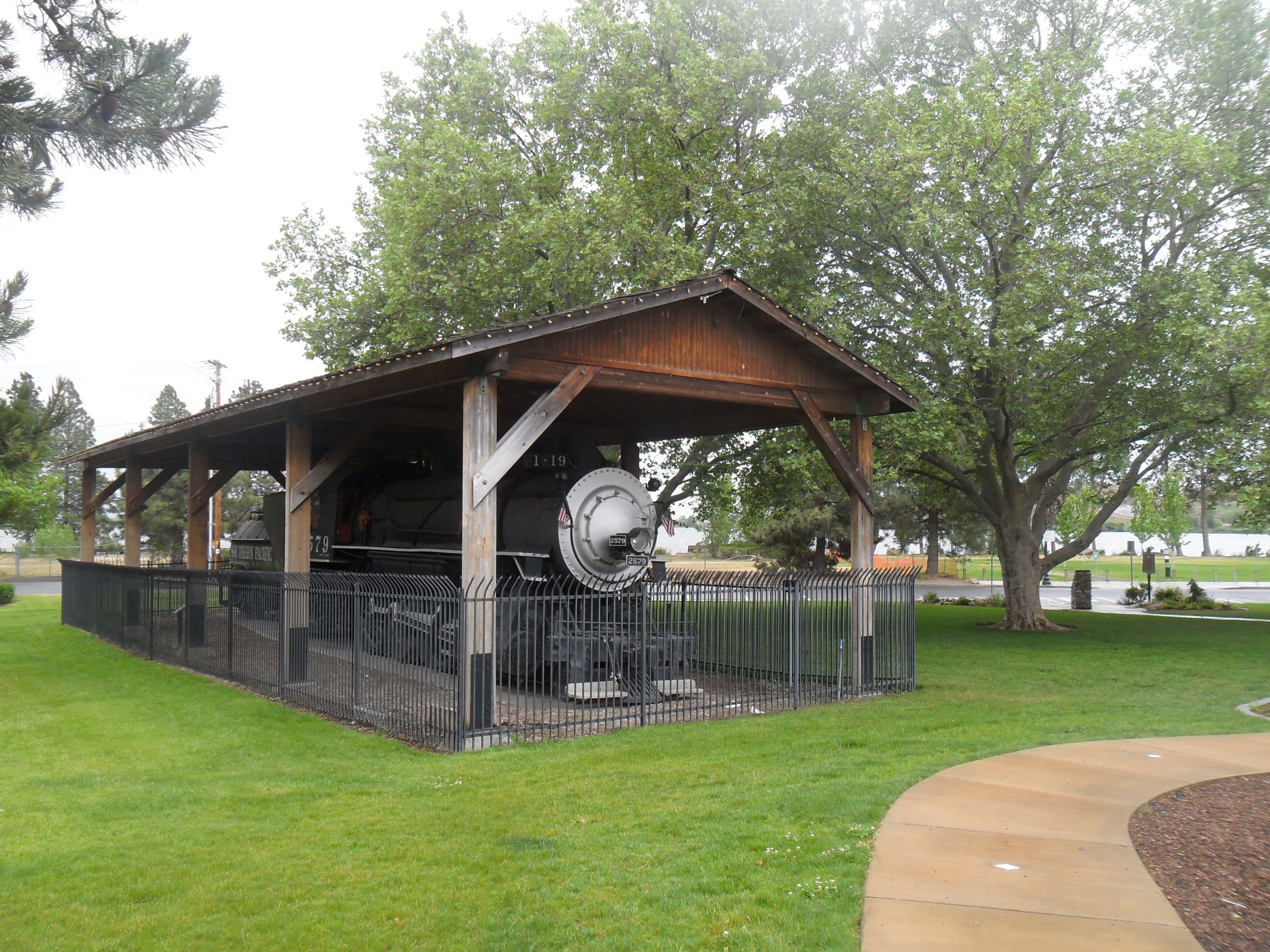
Type and origin
- Power type: Steam
- Builder: Baldwin Locomotive Works
- Serial number: 27681
- Build date: 1906
Specifications
- Configuration
  - Whyte: 2-8-0
- Gauge: 4 ft 8 1/2 in (1,435 mm)
- Driver dia.: 57 in (1,448 mm)
- Adhesive weight: 184,000 lb (83,000 kg) until 1922, then 191,000 lb (86,640 kg)
- Loco weight: 207,000 lb (93,890 kg) until 1922, then 216,700 lb (98,290 kg)
- Tender weight: 135,000 lb (61,230 kg) after 1922
- Fuel type: Oil
- Boiler pressure: 200 psi (1.4 MPa) until 1922, then 210 psi (1.4 MPa)
- Cylinders: Two, outside
- Cylinder size: 22 in × 30 in (560 mm × 760 mm)
- Valve gear: Stephenson until 1922, then Walschaerts
Performance figures
- Tractive effort: 43,660 lbf (194.21 kN) until 1922, then 45,471 lbf (202.27 kN)
Career
- Operators: Southern Pacific Railroad
- Class: C-9
- Number in class: 87
- Numbers: SP 2579
- Retired: September 8, 1957
- Current owner: City of Klamath Falls
- Disposition: On static display

2579 is a heavy 2-8-0 "Consolidation" type steam locomotive built by Baldwin Locomotive Works in 1906 for the Southern Pacific. No. 2579 is currently on display in the Veterans Memorial Park in Klamath Falls, Oregon. Last used in revenue service in November 1956, No. 2579 was donated to the city in September 1957.

== History ==
No. 2579 is a typical example of small steam locomotives that were used by the Southern Pacific Railroad. It worked on many different tasks from 1906 until 1956, even handling passenger trains on rare occasions. At nearly 207,000 pounds and 71 feet in length, No. 2579 was used for freight on the SP's Portland, Sacramento, Shasta, and Western Divisions. It was retired from operations in November 1956 and removed from the active roster of locomotives in May 1957.

Southern Pacific 2579 was donated to the City of Klamath Falls on September 8, 1957. Since then, No. 2579 has been on display in Veterans Memorial Park along the shores of Lake Ewauna, near the junction of Main Street and US97.
