= Southern Arizona Transportation Museum =

Railroad museum in Tucson, Arizona

Coordinates: 32.2236°N 110.9671°W

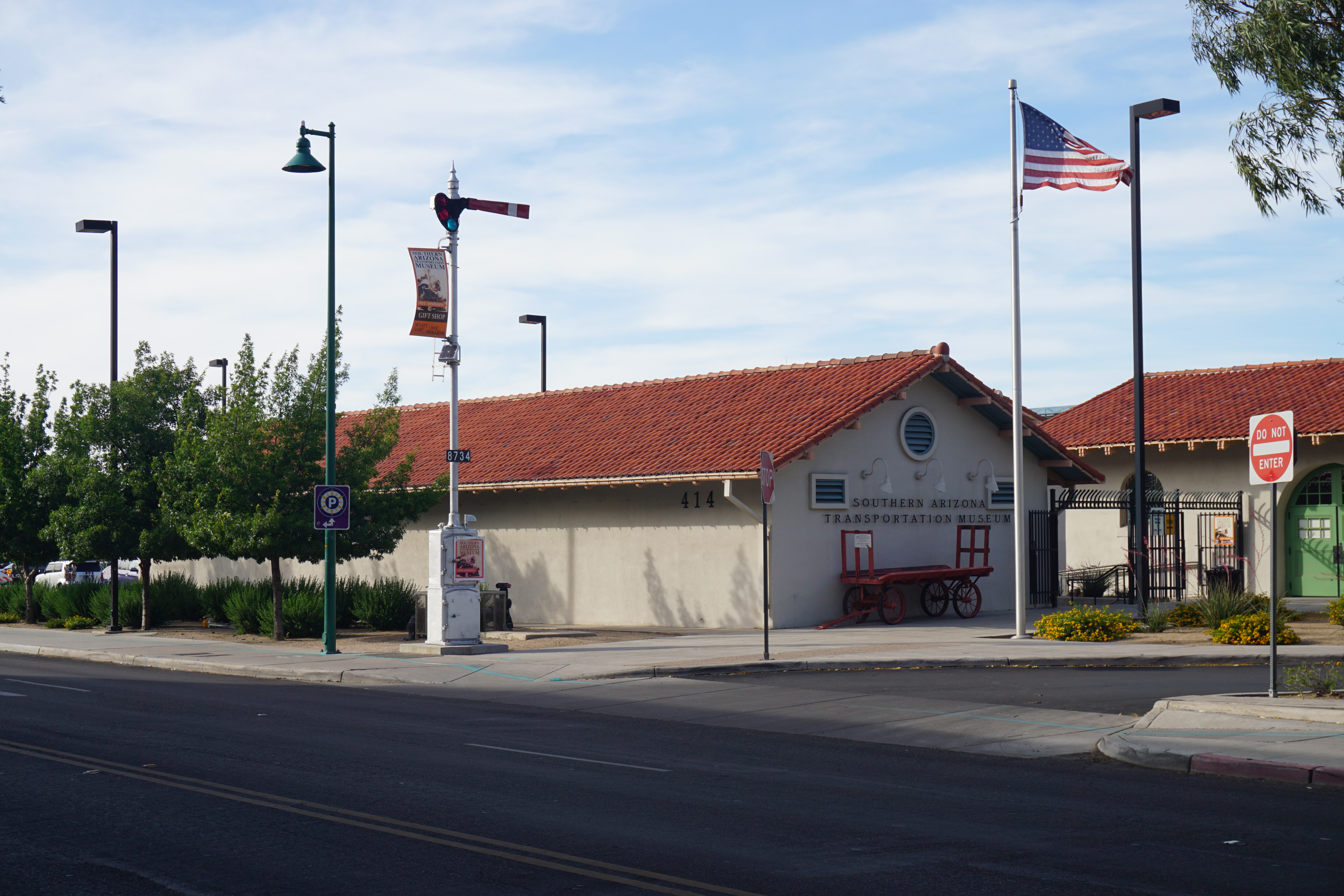
Southern Arizona Transportation Museum

The Southern Arizona Transportation Museum is a railroad museum in Tucson, Arizona. It is located in the former records vault building at the former Southern Pacific Depot, which was renovated by the City of Tucson in 2004.

The museum does not charge for admission. Guided tours of the facility are available for a small fee, by appointment only. The museum offers community events, downtown historic walking tours (October–March), railroad safety education, an oral history program and an active collections department preserving artifacts pertaining to transportation in southern Arizona.

== Features ==
=== Southern Pacific 1673 ===
Southern Pacific locomotive #1673 is on display at the museum. The 2-6-0 M-4b Mogul locomotive was built for the Southern Pacific Railroad by Schenectady Locomotive Works of Schenectady, New York in November 1900. The locomotive is listed on the National Register of Historic Places.

=== Depot ===
The depot lobby is currently used as a waiting room for passengers using Amtrak trains, and the rest of the depot and buildings are leased to various businesses.

=== Silver Spike Festival ===
Every year in March, the Southern Arizona Transportation Museum, located in downtown Tucson, holds the Silver Spike Festival. The festival commemorates the arrival of the train to Tucson, in March, 1880. The 2014 event, had such notable guests as Mayor Jonathan Rothschild and Arizona Daily Star newspaper columnist David Leighton. The event also included a reenactment by descendants of some of the early pioneers (i.e. Estevan Ochoa, P.R. Tully, and Robert Leatherwood) of Tucson and music from the 4th United States Cavalry Regiment Band.

== See also ==
- Old Pueblo Trolley
- List of heritage railroads in the United States
