= Reading 2100 =

Preserved American 4-8-4 steam locomotive (RDG class T-1)

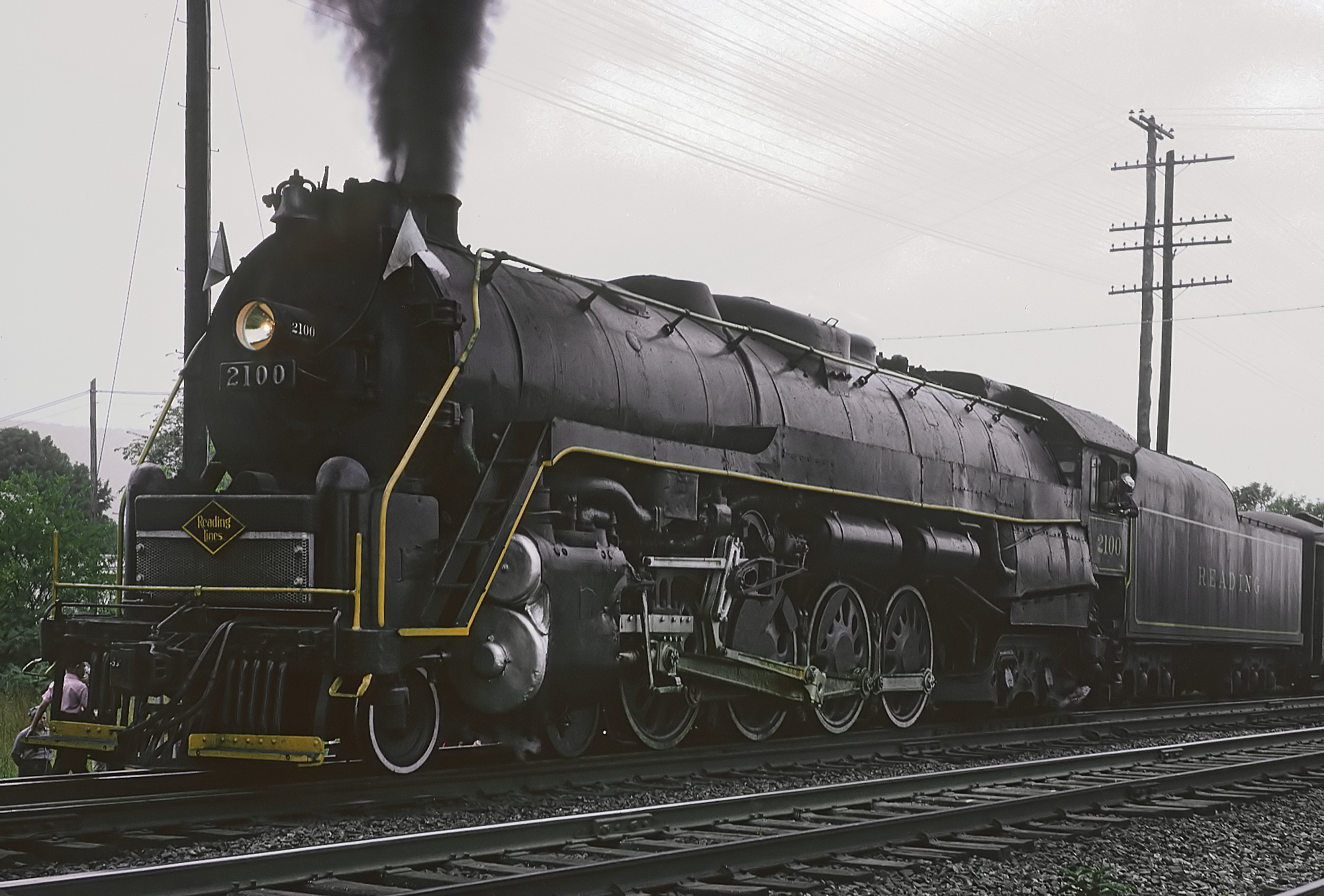
- Reading No. 2100 pulling one of the last excursion trains of the Iron Horse Rambles in September 1964
Type and origin
- Power type: Steam
- Builder: Baldwin Locomotive Works
- Serial number: 58330
- Build date: May 1923 (As Class I10sa 2-8-0 Consolidation #2045)
- Rebuilder: Reading Company
- Rebuild date: September 1945 (Rebuilt as : T1 4-8-4 Northern 2100)
Specifications
- Configuration
  - Whyte: New: 2-8-0; Rebuilt: 4-8-4
  - UIC: New: 1'D; Rebuilt: 2'D'2
- Gauge: 4 ft 8 1/2 in (1,435 mm) standard gauge
- Driver dia.: 70 in (1,778 mm)
- Length: 110 ft 6 in (33.68 m)
- Axle load: 69,550 lb (31,550 kilograms; 31.55 metric tons)
- Adhesive weight: 278,200 lb (126,200 kilograms; 126.2 metric tons)
- Loco weight: 441,300 lb (200,200 kilograms; 200.2 metric tons)
- Total weight: 809,000 lb (367,000 kilograms; 367 metric tons)
- Fuel type: New: Anthracite coal; Now: Recycled vegetable oil (Post-current restoration)
- Fuel capacity: Coal: 52,000 lb (24,000 kilograms; 24 metric tons); Oil: 5,000 US gallons (19,000 L; 4,200 imp gal)
- Water cap.: 19,000 US gallons (72,000 L; 16,000 imp gal)
- Firebox
  - Grate area: 94.5 sq ft (8.78 m^{2})
- Boiler pressure: 240 lbf/in^{2} (1.65 MPa)
- Cylinders: Two, outside
- Cylinder size: 27 in × 32 in (686 mm × 813 mm)
- Valve gear: Walschaerts
- Valve type: Piston valves
- Loco brake: Air
- Train brakes: Air
- Couplers: Knuckle
Performance figures
- Power output: 5,500 hp (4,100 kW)
- Tractive effort: Loco: 68,000 lbf (302.5 kN), Booster 11,100 lbf (49.4 kN),
- Factor of adh.: 4.09
Career
- Operators: Reading Company; 2100 Corporation; RailLink, Ltd.; Golden Pacific Railroad; American Steam Railroad Preservation Association (leased)
- Class: New: I-10sa; Rebuilt: T-1
- Numbers: RDG 2045; RDG 2100; TPHX 2100; AFT 250
- Retired: 1956 (revenue service); October 17, 1964 (1st excursion service); 2007 (2nd excursion service)
- Restored: 1961 (1st excursion service); March 25, 1989 (2nd excursion service)
- Current owner: Private owner
- Disposition: Undergoing restoration to operating condition

Reading 2100 is a T-1 class 4-8-4 "Northern" type steam locomotive, originally built by the Baldwin Locomotive Works (BLW) in May 1923 as an I-10sa class 2-8-0 "Consolidation" type locomotive for the Reading Company (RDG), No. 2100 was rebuilt by RDG's own locomotive shops as a 4-8-4 "Northern" in September 1945, No. 2100 pulled heavy freight and coal trains for the Reading until being retired from revenue service in 1956. Between 1961 and 1964, No. 2100 was used to pull the RDG's Iron Horse Rambles excursions alongside fellow T-1s Nos. 2124 and 2102. After the rambles ended, No. 2100 was sold along with No. 2101 in 1967 to a scrapyard in Baltimore, Maryland.

No. 2100 subsequently went through multiple ownership changes and spent more time in storage or being moved than it did operating under its own power. In 1998, it was sold to Thomas Payne, who moved it to St. Thomas, Ontario in Canada and modified it to burn oil. It eventually made its way to the Golden Pacific Railroad in Tacoma, Washington to pull tourist trains for one year, before it sat idle in Richland.

In 2015, the American Steam Railroad Preservation Association (ASR) began a long-term lease on No. 2100 and moved it to the Ex-Baltimore and Ohio roundhouse in Cleveland, Ohio. In 2023, ASR announced that No. 2100 would debut as American Freedom Train No. 250, painting it almost identically to how No. 2101 appeared on the American Freedom Train. No. 2100 made its public debut under steam on June 27, 2026, with full restoration still ongoing.

== History ==
=== Construction and revenue service ===
No. 2100—originally numbered 2045—was constructed by the Baldwin Locomotive Works (BLW) in Philadelphia, Pennsylvania in May 1925 as an I-10sa class 2-8-0 "Consolidation" type locomotive. The Reading Company (RDG) initially assigned No. 2045 to pull heavy freight trains. Beginning in 1945, the RDG moved thirty of their I-10sas to their shops in Reading, and with assistance from the Baldwin Locomotive Works, they converted and rebuilt the 2-8-0s into T-1 class 4-8-4 "Northerns" to aid the railroad's growing freight traffic.

No. 2045 was the first of the I-10sas to be rebuilt, and it emerged from the shops as T-1 No. 2100. No. 2100 was assigned to pull heavy freight and coal trains across the RDG's mainline and some of its branch lines in Pennsylvania and New Jersey. By 1954, the RDG had removed nearly all their steam locomotives from revenue service, including all thirty of their T-1s. A traffic surge in 1956 encouraged the railroad to return some of the T-1s to service, but they were withdrawn again the following year.

=== First excursion service ===
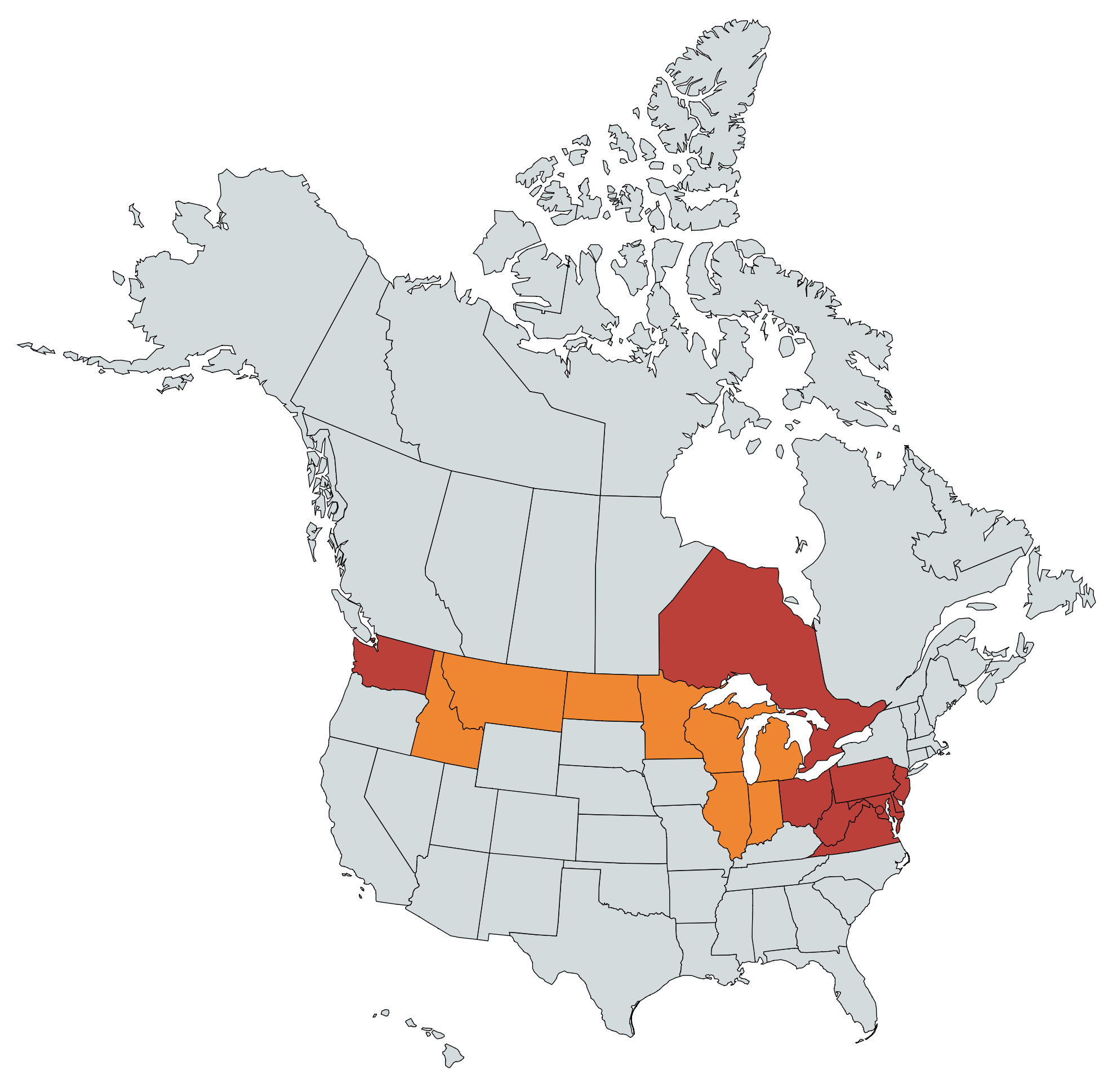
Canadian provinces and US states visited by No. 2100 in excursion service. Note: No. 2100 was towed thru the US states in orange

Beginning in October 1959, the RDG hosted their own steam excursion program, dubbed the Iron Horse Rambles, and T-1 No. 2124 was used to pull the first trains. During the 1961 operating season, when the Rambles peaked at fourteen excursions for the year, No. 2100 was removed from storage and began pulling the trains alongside No. 2124, and later, No. 2102. The majority of the Rambles would travel to Gettysburg, Pennsylvania, while destinations the other trains traveled to included Philadelphia, West Milton, Tamaqua, Shamokin, and Wilmington, Delaware.

On August 15–16, 1964, No. 2100—coupled to a small fleet of RDG passenger cars—traveled outside the RDG and was used to pull a small series of round trip excursions between Baltimore, Maryland and Washington, D.C. for the Baltimore and Ohio Railroad's (B&O) Iron Horse Days program. Since 1960, the RDG had begun to experience financial troubles, and due to rising maintenance costs to operate the T-1s and with their trackage deteriorating, they had to discontinue the Iron Horse Rambles. The fifty-first and final Rambles train would take place on October 17, 1964, between Philadelphia and Tamaqua.

=== Ownership and location changes ===
In September 1967, No. 2100 was sold along with another T-1, No. 2101, to Streigel Equipment and Supply, and both locomotives were put into storage at the company's scrapyard in Baltimore. In 1975, Nos. 2100 and 2101 were purchased for $25,000 by Ross Rowland, who was developing the American Freedom Train (AFT) tour. No. 2101 was restored to operating condition, since its boiler was in better condition, while No. 2100 was used to provide spare parts. After No. 2101 was damaged in a roundhouse fire in 1979, Nos. 2101 and 2100 would swap tenders, and No. 2100 was moved to the former Western Maryland roundhouse in Hagerstown, Maryland. Rowland kept No. 2100 in storage, while he restored and operated No. 2101’s replacement locomotive, Chesapeake and Ohio 614.

In 1986, Rowland sold No. 2100 to owner and CEO of Lionel Trains, Richard Kughn, and he partnered with Rowland and Bill Benson to create the "2100 Corporation". The new corporation financed a complete rebuild for No. 2100 to take place, with some parts from No. 2101 being used. On October 10, 1987, No. 2100 underwent a stationary test fire. In late 1988, at a cost of $900,000, the rebuild was completed, and on March 25, 1989, No. 2100 performed a test run on the Winchester and Western Railroad. Prior to the test run, CSX had sold the Hagerstown roundhouse for redevelopment, and after negotiations to purchase the roundhouse had failed, Rowland had to remove Nos. 2100 and 614 from the building. No. 2100 had to be relocated to nearby Bedington, West Virginia.

In November 1991, No. 2100 moved under its power to the Wheeling and Lake Erie Railway (W&LE) shops in Brewster, Ohio for storage, and plans were made to operate the T-1 on the W&LE mainline, but they never came to fruition. (Note: At the same time, No. 2100 was one of five mainline steam locomotives scheduled to be filmed on the Elgin, Joliet and Eastern Railway around Chicago, Illinois for Paramount Pictures in an action historical film called Night Ride Down. It would have been set around a 1930s Brotherhood of Sleeping Car Porters strike and a Pullman Company lawyer played by Harrison Ford, and it was based on a screenplay written by Willard Huyck and Gloria Katz, with Harold Becker attached as director. The other four locomotives planned for filming were Nickel Plate Road 765, 587, Canadian Pacific 1238, and 1286, and while many other steam locomotives were also considered, No. 2100 was planned to be the main feature locomotive, being used for most of the mainline work. Paramount executives cancelled production, due to the early 1990s recession, and when Harrison Ford backed out of the project over script changes.) Richard Kughn and his 2100 Corp. partners then decided to donate No. 2100 to the Portage Ohio Regional Transportation Authority (PORTA), who agreed to allow Bill Benson to use the locomotive to pull excursions on their trackage around Cleveland, Ohio, but no arrangements were made. Sometime later, the W&LE asked for No. 2100 to be removed from their shops, and the Ohio Central Railroad (OC) agreed to store the locomotive in Coshocton, Ohio while PORTA put it up for sale.

In September 1997, No. 2100 was displayed during the OC's Steam Fest '97 event alongside the railroad's own steam locomotives, including Canadian National 1551 and Canadian Pacific 1293, but the T-1 was the only locomotive to not be fired up for the weekend occasion. An auction to sell No. 2100 was held on January 16, 1998, with eight bidders attending the event, including Ohio Central owner Jerry Joe Jacobson, but the winner was Thomas Payne, the chairman of RailLink, Ltd. of Edmonton, Alberta in Canada. In June, No. 2100 moved under its power to Cleveland, and then Payne had it towed to the Elgin County Railway Museum's (ECRM) former New York Central shop complex in St. Thomas, Ontario for repairs.

At the ECRM, No. 2100 received some cosmetic changes, including the addition of ditch lights and striped running boards, and it was relettered as Ferroequus (Latin for "Iron Horse"). It was also converted from coal to oil firing, and the process proved to be successful, despite popular belief. On November 23, 1999, No. 2100 performed its first test run with Payne's modifications. On August 26-27, 2000, No. 2100 was fired up and displayed outside the ECRM during the Museum's Iron Horse Festival. Payne made plans to use the locomotive to pull excursions on RailLink-owned regional and short line railways in Alberta, Ontario, and Quebec. Those plans fell through, and the T-1 was left in storage for a few more years.

In late 2005, No. 2100 was moved to Tacoma, Washington, and the following year, it pulled limited sightseeing trains for Payne's Golden Pacific Railroad, using Tacoma Rail's former Milwaukee Road line. In June 2007, No. 2100 travelled light over the BNSF mainline from Tacoma to Richland, Washington, and Payne expected to give the locomotive an annual inspection before operating it on the Tri-City and Olympia Railroad. By 2009, No. 2100 was left in outdoor storage in Richland, and ownership of the locomotive was transferred to an undisclosed individual.

=== American Steam Railroad restoration ===
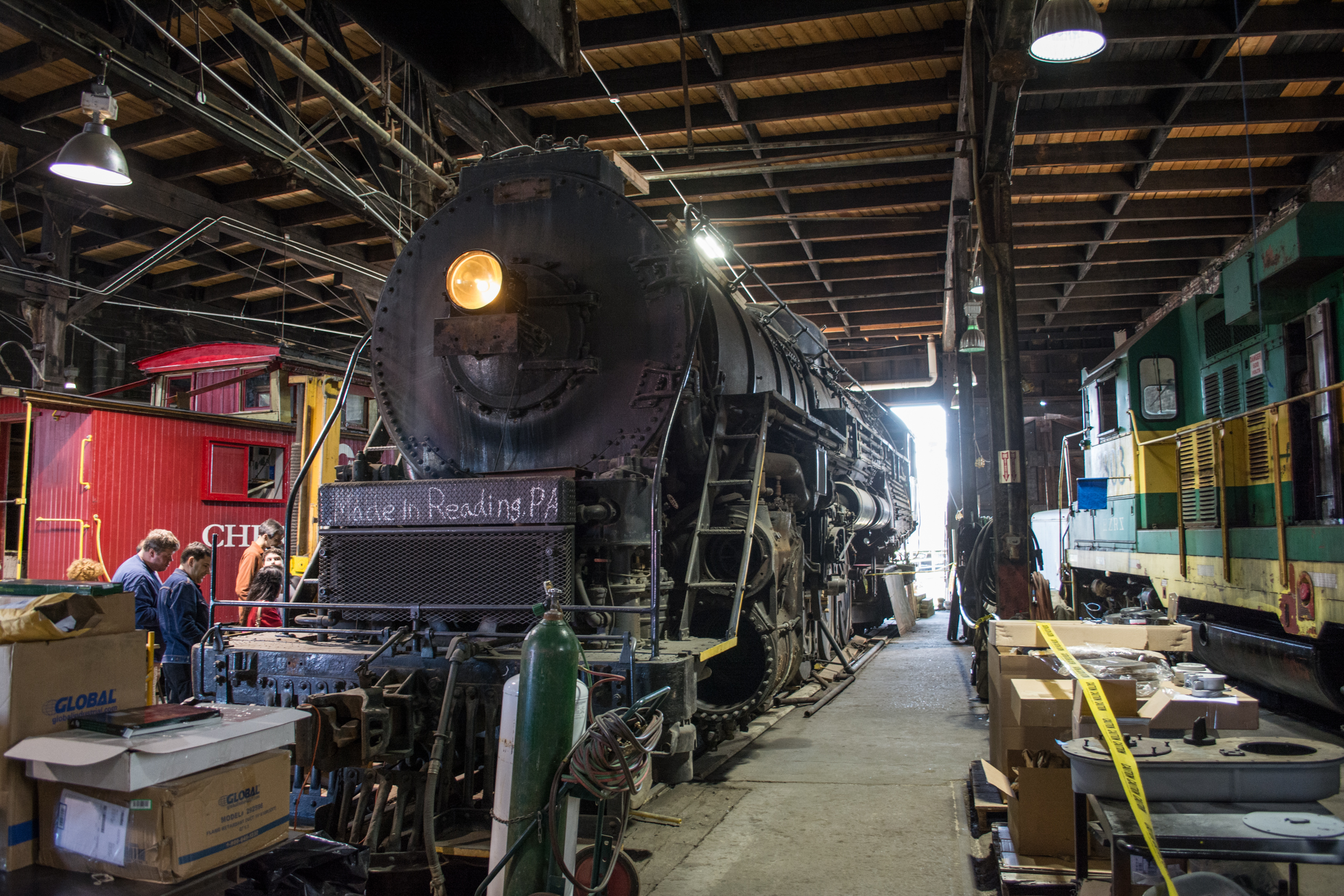
No. 2100 undergoing restoration inside the ex-B&O West 3rd Street roundhouse in September 2017

In April 2015, the American Steam Railroad Preservation Association (ASR) announced that they had signed a long-term loan with the No. 2100 locomotive. They launched their own fundraising campaign, called Fire Up 2100, and they estimated that the restoration would cost $700,000 to complete. That same month, No. 2100 and its tender were loaded onto two separate heavy-duty flatcars, and they were shipped via BNSF, Norfolk Southern, and CSX to Cleveland over a two-month period. Upon arrival, No. 2100 was moved inside the Midwest Railway Preservation Society's (MRPS) Ex-B&O roundhouse next to the MRPS's own locomotive, Grand Trunk Western 4070, and the ASR began work to restore the T-1. In August 2023, the ASR announced that they and FMW Solutions would modify No. 2100's firebox to burn recycled oil instead of coal. ASR Treasurer Forrest Nace would state in a press release,

"Taking into account the expense of not only the coal but its transport, proper storage, loading, and ash abatement, it became evident that it would be difficult to have any remaining funds after operating at non-steam railroads and museums we are in discussions with. Additionally, the logistics of storing, refueling, and burning liquid fuel is in-line with what modern railroads and diesel operated tourist lines are accustomed to, thereby greatly and expanding our opportunities and reducing emissions."

In November, the ASR announced that once No. 2100 is restored, it will be painted in American Freedom Train (AFT) colors similar to that on No. 2101 and renumbered as AFT No. 250 for the United States Semiquincentennial in 2026. In March 2024, the boiler passed its FRA-mandated hydrostatic test. On April 3, 2025, No. 2100 was test fired, marking the first time it was under steam since the late 2000s.

On February 26 and 27, 2026, No. 2100 would successfully pass a steam test observed by the Federal Railroad Administration, which saw the engine brought up to its full operating steam pressure of 240 psi. With the steam tests a success, ASR crews announced their plans to finish the running gear and any remaining appliances on the locomotive. No. 2100 made its public debut under steam on June 27, 2026, at the Cleveland Railroad Festival, with full restoration still ongoing.

== See also ==
- Reading 1187
- Reading 1251
- Grand Trunk Western 6325
- Canadian National 6060
- Spokane, Portland and Seattle 700

== Bibliography ==
- Zimmermann, Karl (Fall 2018). "Rambling on the Reading". Classic Trains. Vol. 19, no. 3. Kalmbach Media. pp. 22–28.
