= Reading 2101 =

Preserved American 4-8-4 steam locomotive (RDG class T-1)

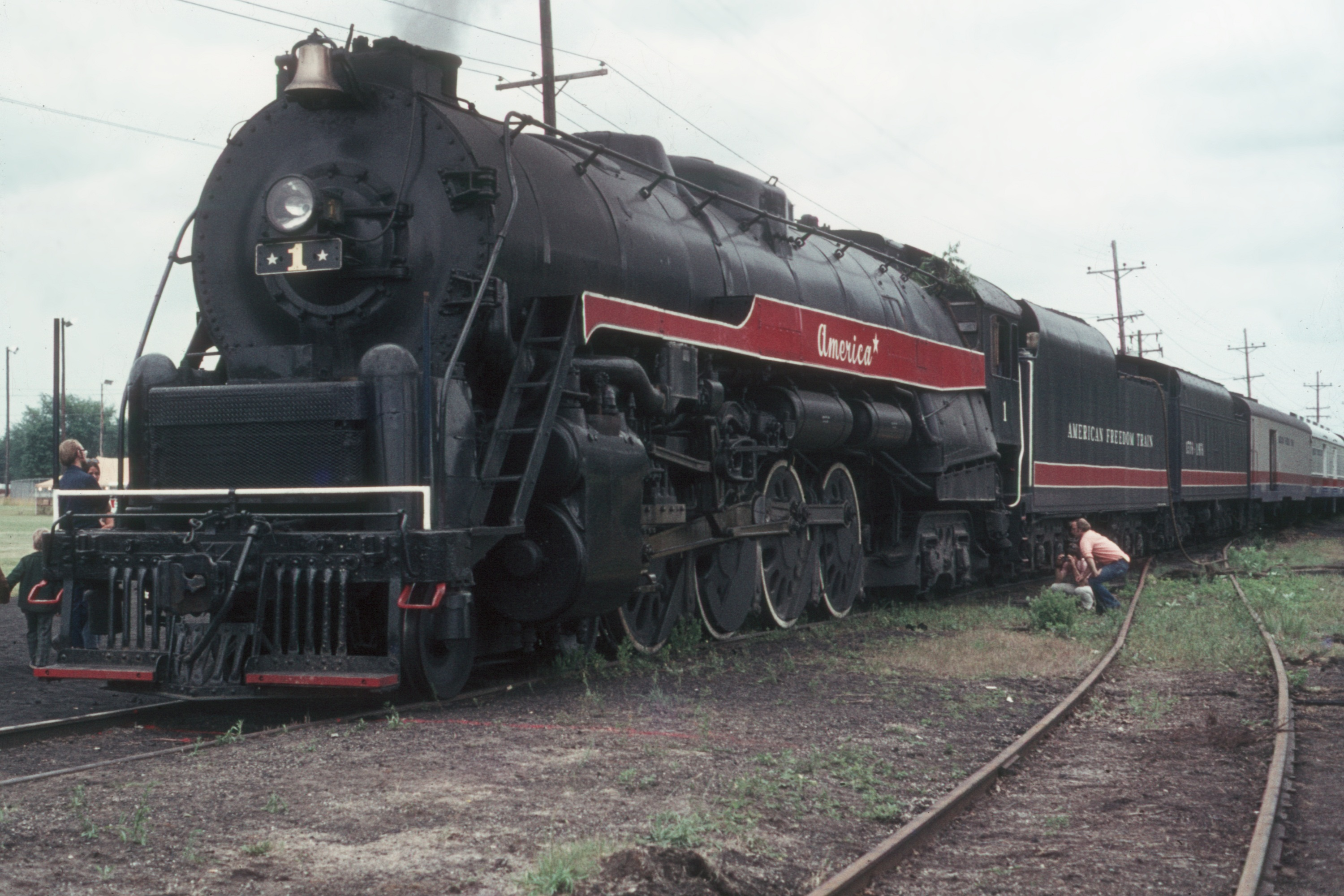
- Reading No. 2101 in its American Freedom Train Livery with the consist as No. 1 at Notre Dame, Indiana on July 13, 1975
Type and origin
- Power type: Steam
- Builder: Baldwin Locomotive Works
- Serial number: 58278
- Build date: March 1923 (As Class I10sa 2-8-0 Consolidation #2037)
- Rebuilder: Reading Company
- Rebuild date: September 1945 (Rebuilt as : T1 4-8-4 Northern 2101)
Specifications
- Configuration
  - Whyte: New: 2-8-0; Rebuilt: 4-8-4
- Gauge: 4 ft 8 1/2 in (1,435 mm) standard gauge
- Driver dia.: 70 in (1,778 mm)
- Length: 110 ft 6 in (33.68 m)
- Adhesive weight: 278,200 lb (126,200 kilograms; 126.2 metric tons)
- Loco weight: 441,300 lb (200,200 kilograms; 200.2 metric tons)
- Total weight: 809,000 lb (367,000 kilograms; 367 metric tons)
- Fuel type: Anthracite coal
- Fuel capacity: 52,000 lb (24,000 kilograms; 24 metric tons)
- Water cap.: 19,000 US gallons (72,000 L; 16,000 imp gal)
- Firebox
  - Grate area: 94.5 sq ft (8.78 m^{2})
- Boiler pressure: 240 lbf/in^{2} (1.65 MPa)
- Cylinders: Two, outside
- Cylinder size: 27 in × 32 in (686 mm × 813 mm)
- Valve gear: Walschaerts
- Valve type: Piston valves
- Loco brake: Air
- Train brakes: Air
- Couplers: Knuckle
Performance figures
- Tractive effort: Loco: 68,000 lbf (302.5 kN), Booster 11,100 lbf (49.4 kN)
- Factor of adh.: 4.09
Career
- Operators: Reading Company
- Class: New: I-10sa; Rebuilt: T-1
- Number in class: 2nd of 30
- Numbers: RDG 2037; RDG 2101; AFT 1; CHES-C 2101
- Nicknames: American Freedom Train #1 George S. Cashman
- Retired: 1956 (revenue service); March 6, 1979 (excursion service)
- Restored: March 28, 1975 (1st excursion service); January 12, 2026 (cosmetically)
- Current owner: National Museum of Railroad History & Innovation
- Disposition: On static display

Reading 2101 is a preserved T-1 class 4-8-4 "Northern" type steam locomotive, originally built by the Baldwin Locomotive Works (BLW) in March 1923 as an I-10sa class 2-8-0 "Consolidation" type locomotive for the Reading Company (RDG), No. 2101 was rebuilt by RDG's own locomotive shops as a 4-8-4 "Northern" in September 1945, the No. 2101 handled heavy coal train traffic for the Reading until being retired from revenue service in 1959. Withheld from scrapping, the 2101 served as emergency backup power for the three other T1 locomotives serving the Reading's "Iron Horse Rambles" excursions until being sold for scrap in 1964.

In 1975, the locomotive was restored to operation from scrapyard condition in an emergency 30-day overhaul after being selected to pull the first eastern portion of the American Freedom Train. On March 6, 1979, while being stored one winter in a Chessie System roundhouse in Silver Grove, KY, 2101 was severely damaged in a fire. Also damaged in that fire was a NYC Mohawk tender, which is now located at the National New York Central Railroad Museum in Elkhart, Indiana. 2101 was cosmetically restored and placed in the B&O Railroad Museum (now the National Museum of Railroad History & Innovation) on Labor Day, 1979, in exchange for Chesapeake and Ohio 614. As of 2026, the locomotive remains on display in its American Freedom Train No. 1 paint scheme, and has completed another cosmetic restoration.

== History ==
=== Construction and revenue service ===
In 1945, while World War II was nearing its end, the Reading Company (RDG) was looking into ordering large steam locomotives for use in heavy freight trains, but due to restrictions from the War Production Board, the company was only allowed to rebuild and modify their existing locomotives. Beginning in 1945, the RDG moved thirty of its I-10sa class 2-8-0 locomotives to their shops in Reading, and with assistance from the Baldwin Locomotive Works, they rebuilt them into new 4-8-4 locomotives that were numbered 2100-2129 and classified as T-1's. No. 2101 was originally built by the Baldwin Locomotive Works (BLW) in March 1923 as I-10a 2-8-0 No. 2037 and was converted to Reading No. 2101 in September 1945 in the Reading shops using Baldwin Locomotive Works provided parts.

In revenue service, No. 2101 pulled many mixed freight and coal trains, until 1954, when nearly all steam locomotives on the RDG were removed from service. Most of the T-1's were briefly returned to service on the RDG to remedy a traffic surge in 1956, before they were withdrawn again. Beginning in 1959, the RDG launched the "Iron Horse Rambles", where a few T-1 locomotives would be used to pull excursion fantrips across the railroad's system. Nos. 2100, 2102, and 2124 were used for the Rambles. No. 2101 was kept inside the RDG's roundhouse in Reading to serve as back-up power, but it never ran.

Despite its popularity, rising operating costs and deteriorating trackage forced the end of the Rambles, and the final train took place on October 17, 1964. The RDG subsequently sold off all its remaining T-1's, and No. 2101 was sold along with No. 2100 in September 1967 to Streigel Equipment and Supply, and they were both moved to their scrapyard in Baltimore, Maryland for storage.

=== Excursion service ===
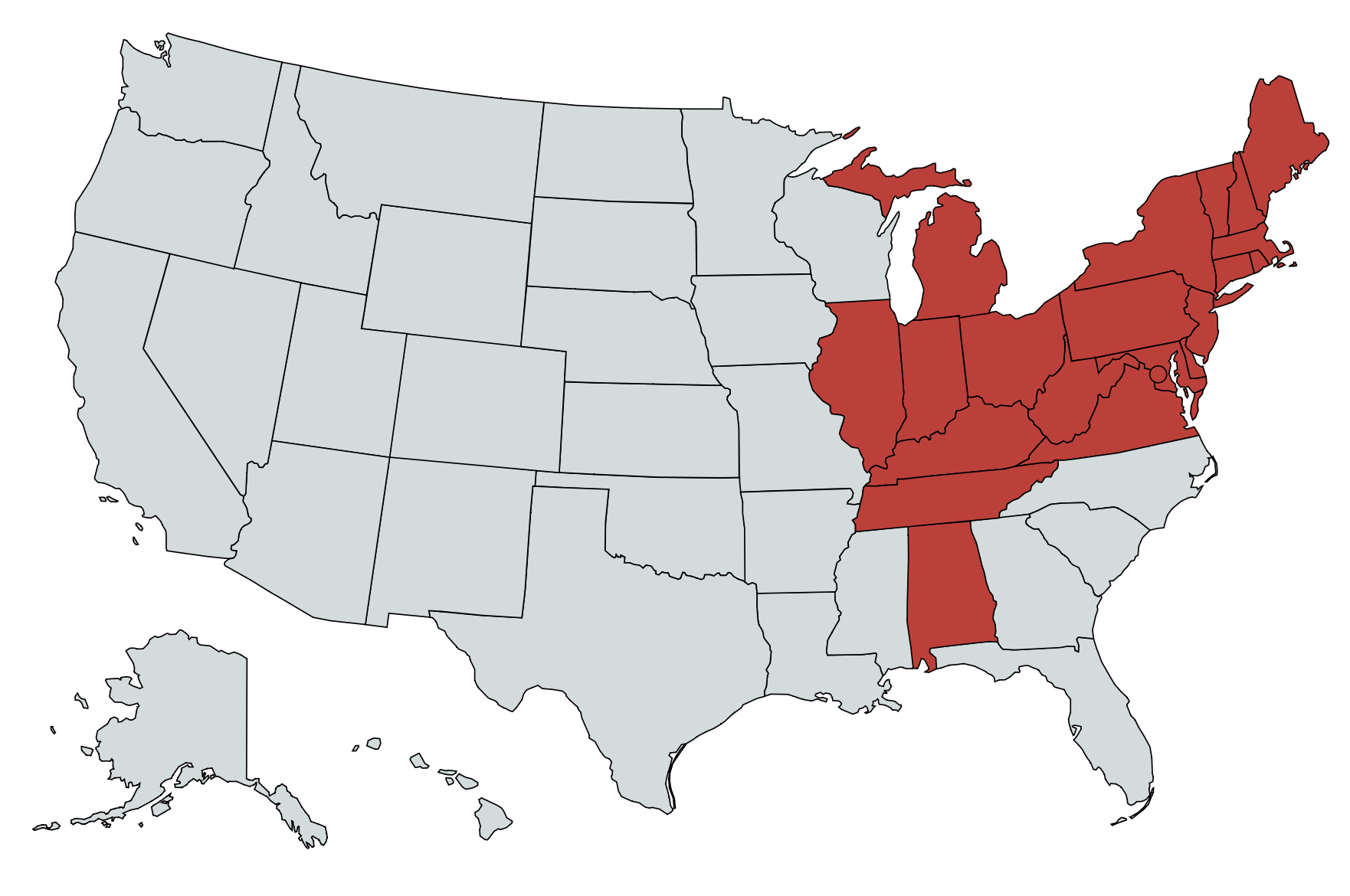
US states visited by No. 2101 in excursion service

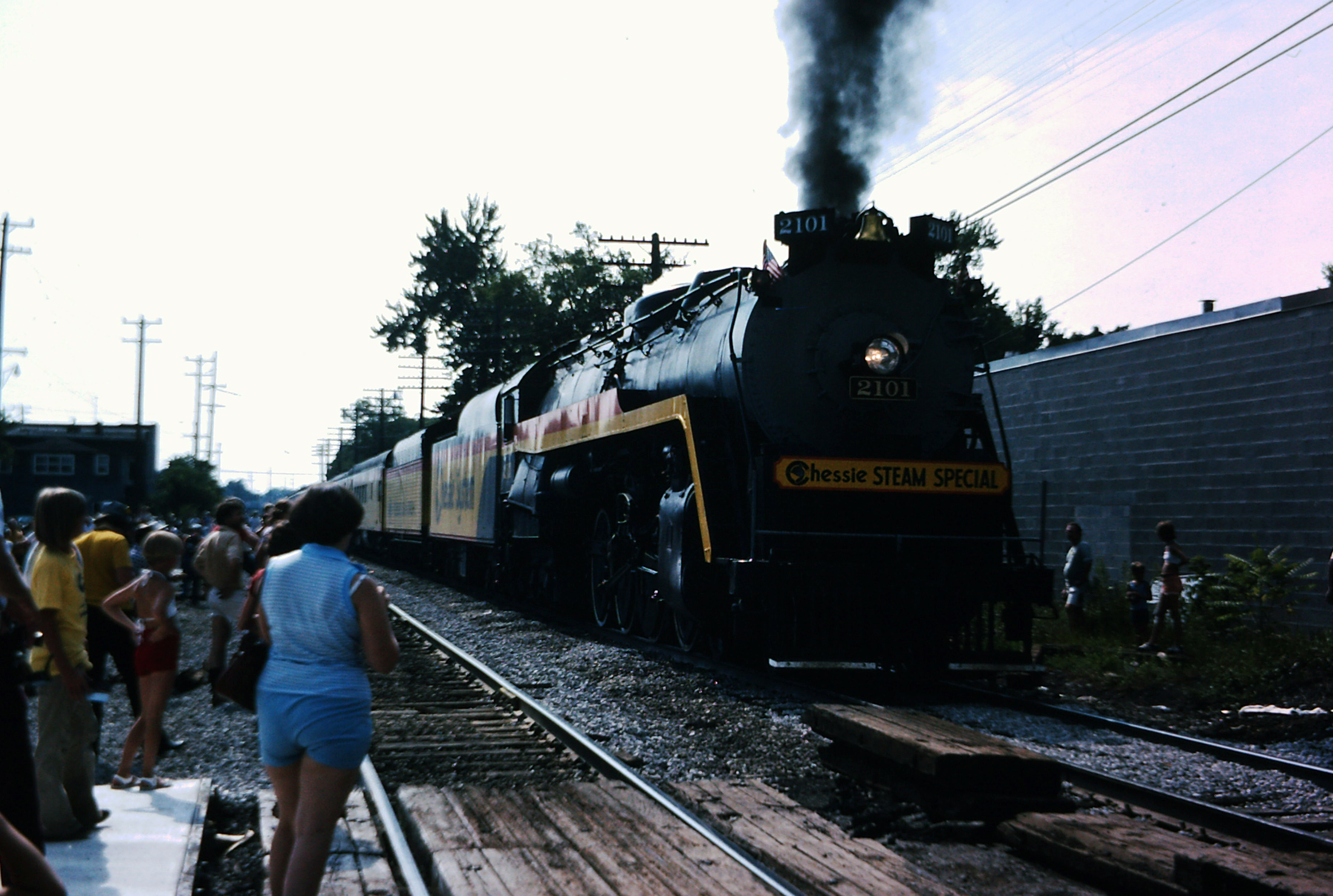
No. 2101 in the course of its Chessie Steam Special in Plymouth, Michigan in July 1977

In 1975, the United States was preparing for its Bicentennial celebrations, and plans were underway to operate the American Freedom Train, which would travel across the country and stop at major cities. Led by Ross Rowland, a nationwide search was carried out to search for locomotives to restore and use to pull the train. Southern Pacific 4449 had been selected as the primary locomotive for the train, but clearances prohibited it from travelling within the northeastern portion of the U.S. Ross Rowland subsequently purchased Nos. 2101 and 2100 to pull the train in the northeast, and No. 2101 was selected to be restored, while No. 2100 was used for spare parts. No. 2101 was restored to operating condition in only thirty days by March 28, 1975, and it was repainted as American Freedom Train No. 1. No. 2101 pulled the eastern section of the trip before giving it to No. 4449 in Chicago for the western section. On the return trip east, No. 2101 again took charge of the train at Birmingham, Alabama, and it pulled the train through New England, before it was transferred back to No. 4449 at Washington, D.C..

In 1977, following the end of the Bicentennial celebrations, No. 2101 was repainted into a bright yellow-and-orange livery and pulled many excursions arranged by Ross Rowland on the Chessie System as the "Chessie Steam Special" to celebrate the 150th anniversary of the Baltimore and Ohio Railroad. On March 6, 1979, No. 2101 was damaged in a roundhouse fire in Russell, Kentucky, which was caused by faulty electricity. While most of the damage was cosmetic, the T-1 was damaged to such an extent that it would require a complete inspection before returning to service.

=== Disposition ===
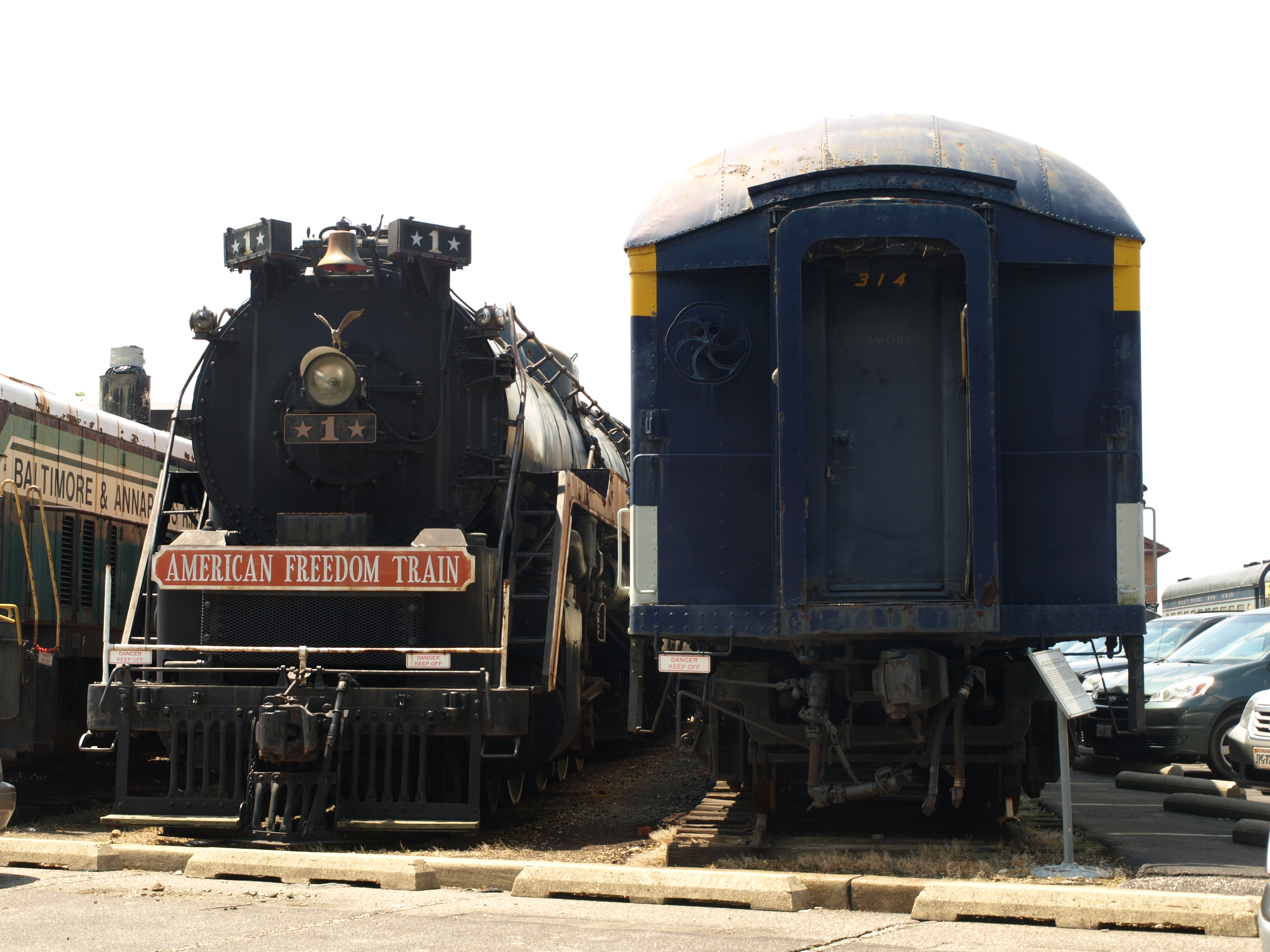
No. 2101 on display at the National Museum of Railroad History & Innovation in 2011, before its cosmetic restoration

The inspection was deemed costly and a trade was made for C&O 614, facilitated by Hays T. Watkins and Ross Rowland. Rowland traded No. 2101 to the B&O Railroad Museum, in exchange for Chesapeake and Ohio 614, which would pull the 1981 Chessie Safety Express between Baltimore to Hagerstown. No. 2101 was cosmetically restored as American Freedom Train No. 1, and it remained on static display. During the restoration after the fire, No. 2101's tender was swapped with that from sister No. 2100. When No. 2100 was restored to operating condition in Washington state, No. 2101's old tender was also restored and modified with an oil tank. The No. 2100 and No. 2101 tender were stored together in Richland, Washington until April 2015 when they were shipped to Cleveland, Ohio to be restored again.

On October 21, 2023, No. 2101 was moved into the museum's restoration shop for a complete cosmetic restoration by museum staff and FMW Solutions. On January 12, 2026, No. 2101's cosmetic restoration was finished and made its public reveal in time for the United States Semiquincentennial. Notably, the name of George S. Cashman is missing from the cab of No. 2101.

Mr. Cashman was a Chicago Board of Trade member for whom the American Freedom Train Locomotive #1 was lettered in tribute by donor Gene Cashman. Gene to donated $100,000 to the AFT when the foundation was broke in 1973. This donation allowed the foundation to survive to and move forward. Gene asked, in return for the donation, that the locomotive carry the name of his brother who had died of cancer.

== Accidents and incidents ==
- On July 28, 1949, No. 2101 suffered a catastrophic derailment, allegedly while pulling a freight train. The specific location is unknown, and it is unknown if the engineer or fireman were injured or killed.
- On October 21, 2023, during No. 2101's move towards the restoration shops of the National Museum of Railroad History & Innovation, it had a minor incident with one of the displayed passenger cars near the museum due to close clearances and lack of situation awareness. The left cab wall sideswiped the corner of the coach, bending a grab iron on the locomotive cab. The damage was made at a slow speed.

== See also ==
- Reading 1187
- Reading 1251
- Texas and Pacific 610

== Bibliography ==
- Zimmermann, Karl (Fall 2018). "Rambling on the Reading". Classic Trains. Vol. 19, no. 3. Kalmbach Media. pp. 22–28.
