= Reading 2124 =

Preserved American 4-8-4 locomotive (RDG class T-1)

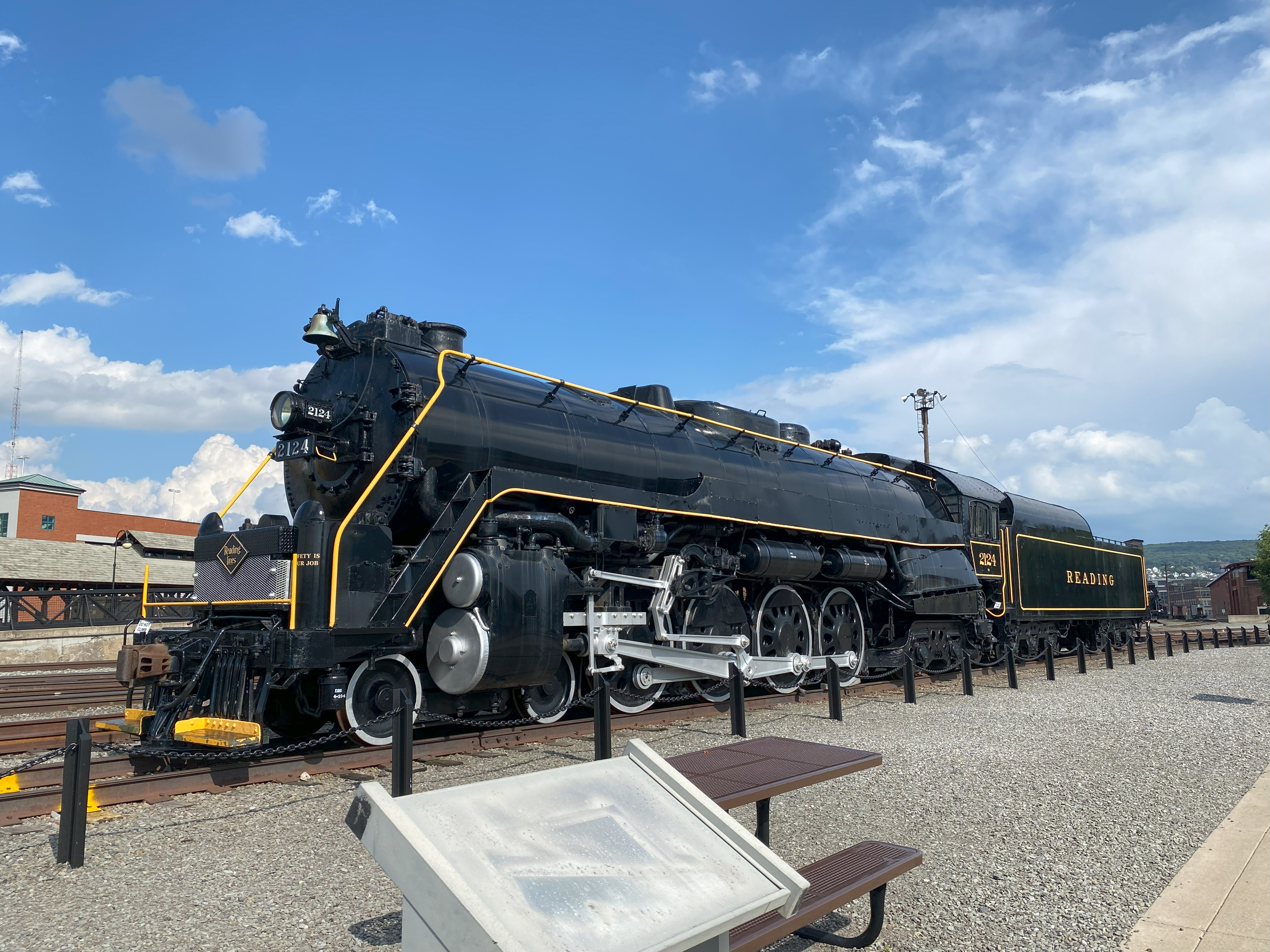
- Reading No. 2124 on static display at Steamtown National Historic Site.
Type and origin
- Power type: Steam
- Builder: Baldwin Locomotive Works
- Serial number: 57596
- Build date: December 1924 (As Class I10sa 2-8-0 Consolidation #2024)
- Rebuilder: Reading Company
- Rebuild date: January 1947 (Rebuilt as : T1 4-8-4 Northern 2124)
Specifications
- Configuration
  - Whyte: New: 2-8-0; Rebuilt: 4-8-4
- Gauge: 4 ft 8 1/2 in (1,435 mm)
- Driver dia.: 70 in (1,778 mm)
- Length: 110 ft 6 in (33.68 m)
- Adhesive weight: 278,200 lb (126.2 tonnes)
- Loco weight: 441,300 lb (200.2 tonnes)
- Total weight: 809,000 lb (367.0 tonnes)
- Fuel type: Anthracite coal
- Fuel capacity: 52,000 lb (23.6 tonnes)
- Water cap.: 19,000 US gallons (72,000 L; 16,000 imp gal)
- Firebox
  - Grate area: 94.5 sq ft (8.78 m^{2})
- Boiler pressure: 240 lbf/in^{2} (1.65 MPa)
- Cylinders: Two, outside
- Cylinder size: 27 in × 32 in (686 mm × 813 mm)
- Valve gear: Walschaerts
- Valve type: Piston valves
- Loco brake: Air
- Train brakes: Air
- Couplers: Knuckle
Performance figures
- Tractive effort: Loco: 67,984 lbf (302.4 kN), Booster 11,100 lbf (49.4 kN)
Career
- Operators: Reading Company
- Class: New: I-10sa; Rebuilt: T-1
- Number in class: 24 out of 30
- Numbers: RDG 2024; RDG 2124
- Retired: 1956 (revenue service); October 22, 1961 (excursion service)
- Restored: May 1959 (1st excursion service); 2019 (cosmetically)
- Current owner: Steamtown National Historic Site
- Disposition: On static display

Reading 2124 is a preserved T-1 class 4-8-4 "Northern" type steam locomotive, originally built by the Baldwin Locomotive Works (BLW) in December 1924 as an I-10sa class 2-8-0 "Consolidation" type locomotive for the Reading Company (RDG), No. 2124 was rebuilt by RDG's own locomotive shops as a 4-8-4 "Northern" in January 1947, No. 2124 pulled heavy freight and coal trains for the Reading until being retired from revenue service in 1956.

No. 2124 was later used by the RDG to pull their Iron Horse Rambles excursion fantrips across the railroad's network between 1959 and 1961. In 1962, No. 2124's flue time expired, and it was sold to F. Nelson Blount, who added it to his Steamtown, U.S.A. collection. As of 2026, No. 2124 remains on static display at Steamtown National Historic Site in Scranton, Pennsylvania.

== History ==
No. 2124 was originally constructed by the Baldwin Locomotive Works (BLW) in December 1924 as an I-10sa class 2-8-0 "Consolidation", and it was originally numbered No. 2024. Beginning in 1945, Reading Company (RDG) began rebuilding thirty of their I-10sa's at their Reading, Pennsylvania shops and converted them into T-1 class 4-8-4 "Northerns", and they were renumbered as the 2100 series. No. 2024 underwent this rebuild in late 1946 and emerged in January 1947 as T-1 No. 2124. No. 2124 was primarily assigned to pull freight and coal trains on the RDG's mainline and certain branchlines throughout Pennsylvania and New Jersey. All T-1 locomotives were withdrawn from revenue service by 1954, but two years later, some were returned to remedy a traffic surge on the RDG and the Pennsylvania Railroad, before they were retired again.

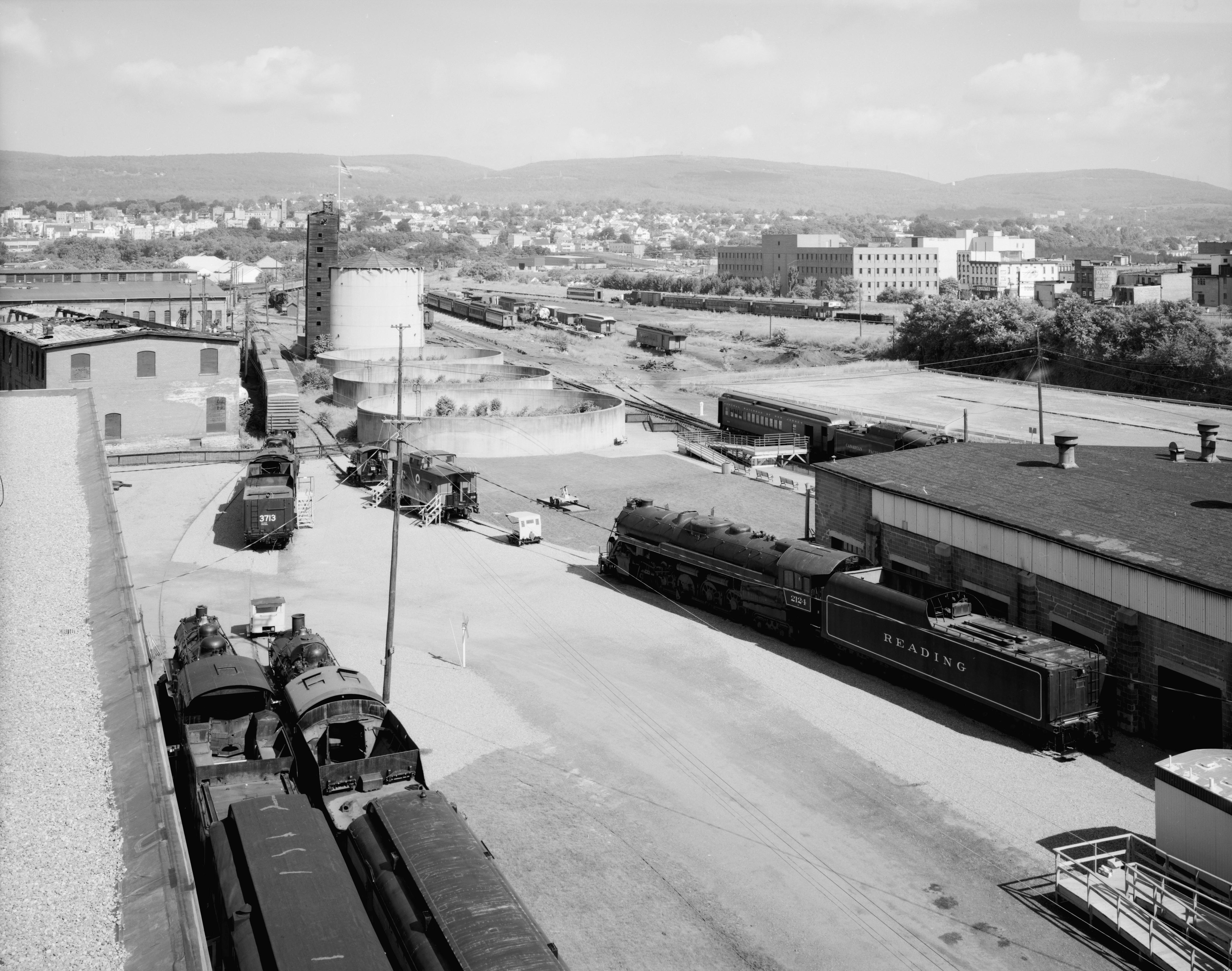
No. 2124 when it was stored in the Ex-Lackawanna Railroad yard in Scranton with other locomotives, including, IC No. 790, MC No. 519, CP No. 2317, and B&M No. 3713, in 1989

In 1959, the RDG decided to run their own steam excursion program, dubbed the "Iron Horse Rambles", and the trains would be powered by T-1 locomotives. No. 2124 pulled the inaugural Rambles train on October 25, 1959, between Wayne Junction in Philadelphia and Shamokin, Pennsylvania, and 950 passengers were on board that day, including Trains magazine editor David P. Morgan. No. 2124 subsequently led all the RDG's Rambles until 1961, when fellow T-1 No. 2100 entered service to assist the trains.

On June 4, 1960, No. 2124 operated outside the RDG and pulled the Lehigh and Hudson River Railway's centennial train between Maybrook, New York and Belvidere, New Jersey. No. 2124 pulled its last Rambles excursion on October 22, 1961, before its flue time expired the following year, and the RDG replaced the locomotive with another T-1, No. 2102, in pulling the trains. No. 2124 was subsequently sold to locomotive collector and the owner of Blount Seafood, F. Nelson Blount, and he moved the T-1 in July 1963 to his Steamtown, U.S.A. museum in North Walpole, New Hampshire. The museum was later relocated across the Connecticut River to Bellows Falls, Vermont.

The locomotive was displayed in Vermont until Steamtown moved to Scranton, Pennsylvania, during the winter of 1983–84. In 1986, Steamtown was taken over by the National Park Service and was renamed as Steamtown National Historic Site. No. 2124 was put on display near the entrance to the park as one of the first things visitors would see.

== Appearance in From the Terrace ==
On December 2, 1959, No. 2124 took part in filming of From the Terrace, a Mark Robson-directed film based on a novel by John O'Hara, and it starred Paul Newman, Joanne Woodward, and Myrna Loy. As part of the script, the opening scene would consist of a train arriving at the Reading Terminal in Philadelphia, but clearance issues prohibited the large T-1 from entering the terminal. The filmmakers instead had to film at the Central Railroad of New Jersey Terminal in Jersey City, and the station was redecorated to represent Philadelphia. No. 2124 was proclaimed as the "Biggest star of the year" during filming.

== See also ==
- Pennsylvania Railroad 1223
- Pennsylvania Railroad 1361
- Reading 1187
- Reading 1251

== Bibliography ==
- Zimmermann, Karl (Fall 2018). "Rambling on the Reading". Classic Trains. Vol. 19, no. 3. Kalmbach Media. pp. 22–28.
