= American Freedom Train (1975–1976) =

Traveling exhibit to commemorate America's bicentennial

The American Freedom Train tour in 1975 and 1976 was one of the many events that celebrated the United States Bicentennial. Consisting of 26 cars, the train was pulled by three steam locomotives. First was Reading Company No. 2101, a Class T-1 4-8-4 locomotive. Next, Southern Pacific No. 4449, a Class GS-4 4-8-4 locomotive, pulled the train across the Western United States. No. 4449 was painted in a special red, white, and blue livery to commemorate the event. Finally, Texas & Pacific No. 610, a Class I-1AR 2-10-4 locomotive, pulled the train along the remainder of the route. For a time, diesel locomotives pulled the train due to track conditions and light rail loadings along the Louisville & Nashville's route from New Orleans to Mobile, Alabama; diesels were also required to pull the train after one of the steam locomotives derailed in Chicago.

This article lists all of the station stops made by the train, which ran from April 1, 1975, to December 31, 1976.

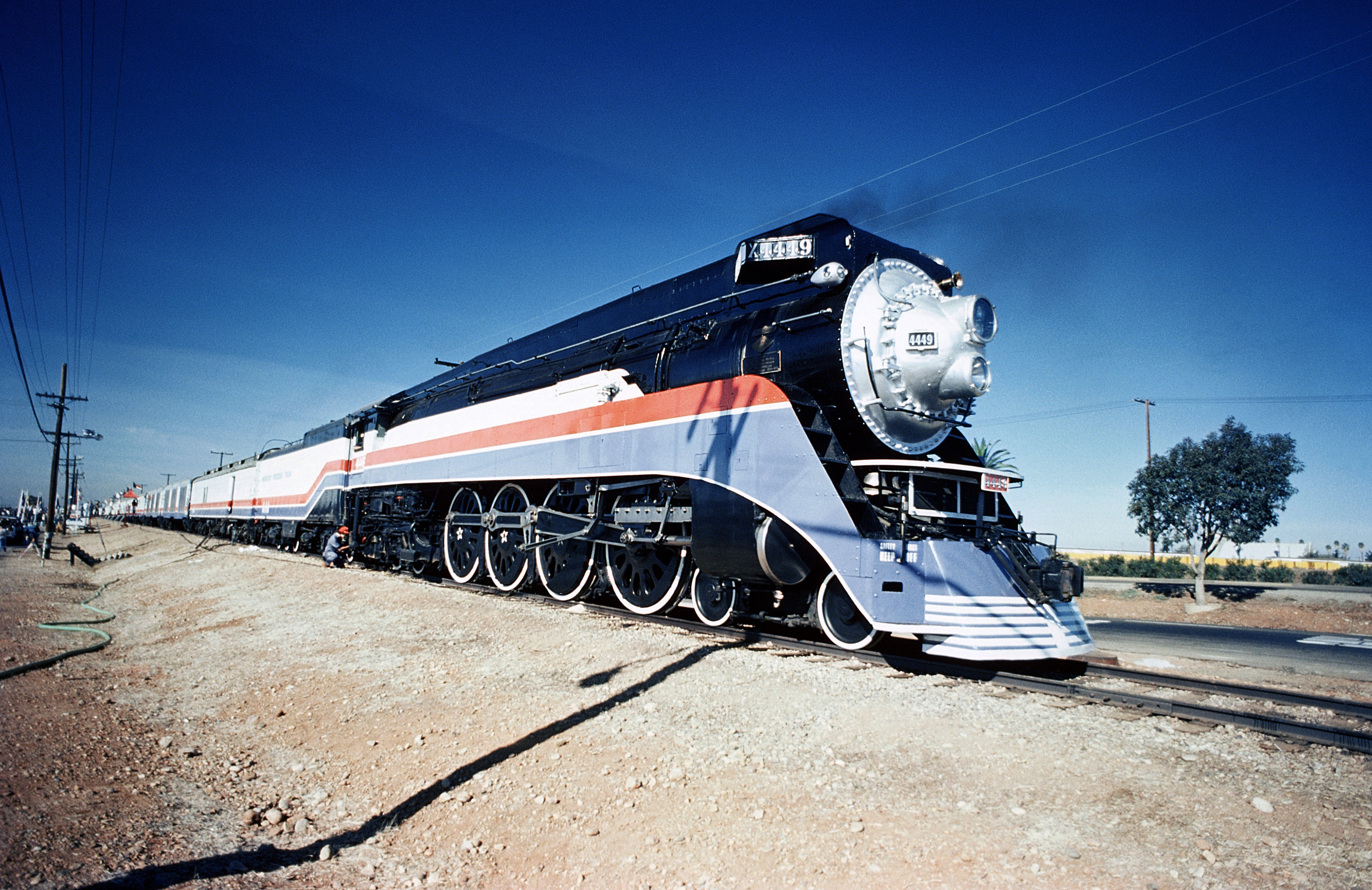
Southern Pacific 4449 idling at Marine Corps Air Station Miramar, California on January 15, 1976.

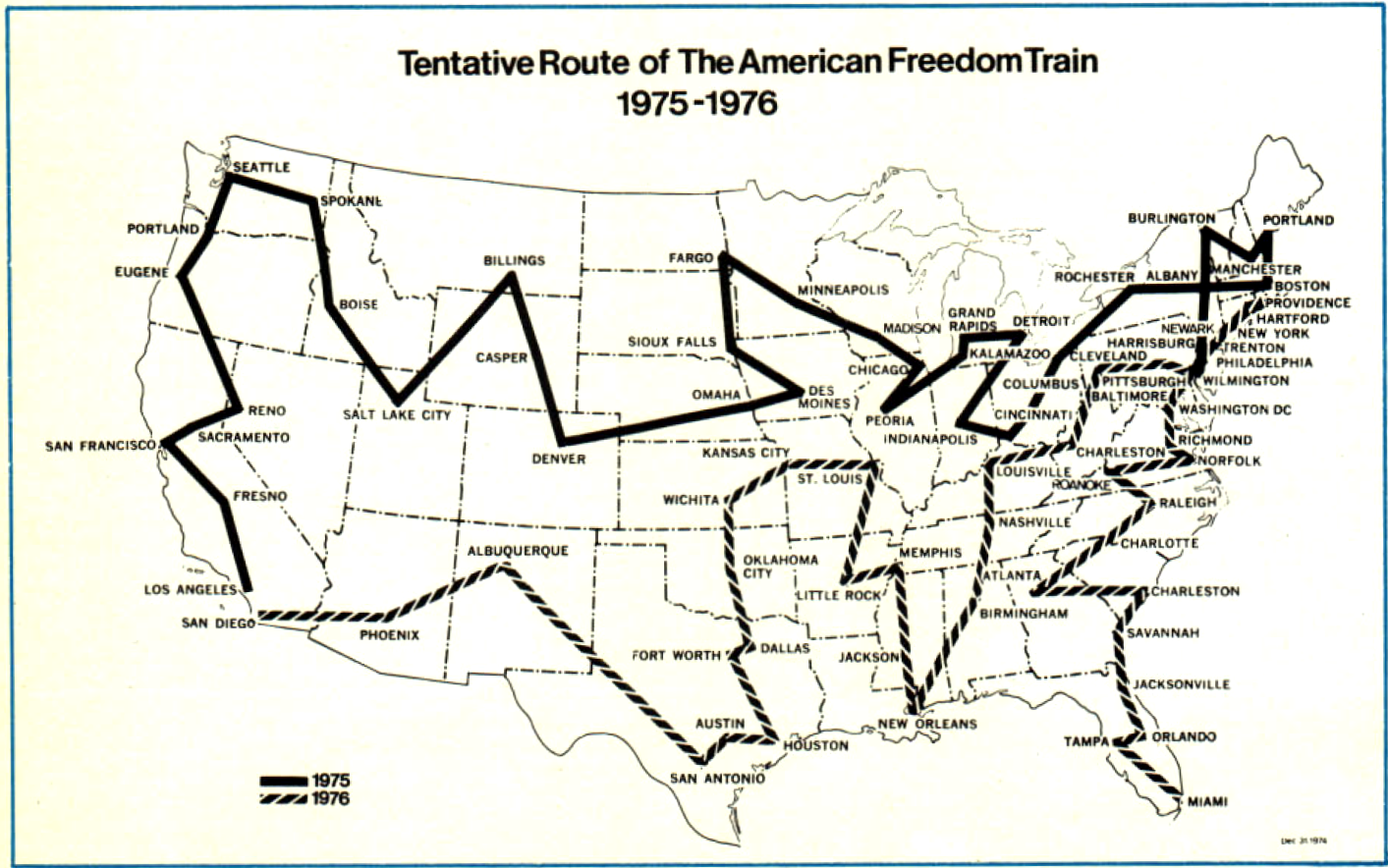
A map of the route.

== 1975 ==
=== April 1975 ===
- April 1 – Wilmington, Delaware
- April 6 – Albany, New York
- April 11 – Burlington, Vermont
- April 14 – White River Junction, Vermont
- April 14 – Manchester, New Hampshire
- April 17 – Portland, Maine
- April 20 – Boston, Massachusetts
- April 29 – Lowell, Massachusetts

=== May 1975 ===
- May 3 – Worcester, Massachusetts
- May 7 – Rochester, New York
- May 14 – Cleveland, Ohio
- May 22 – Columbus, Ohio

=== June 1975 ===
- June 4 – Cincinnati, Ohio
- June 14 – Archbold, Ohio
- June 17 – Fort Wayne, Indiana
- June 19 – Dayton, Ohio
- June 21 – Detroit, Michigan

=== July 1975 ===
- July 5 – Detroit, Michigan
- July 8 – Grand Rapids, Michigan
- July 11 – Kalamazoo, Michigan
- July 14 – South Bend, Indiana
- July 18 – Peoria, Illinois
- July 23 – Springfield, Illinois
- July 28 – LaGrange, Illinois

=== August 1975 ===
- August 5 – Crystal Lake, Illinois
- August 8 – Rockford, Illinois
- August 12 – Aurora, Illinois
- August 15 – Green Bay, Wisconsin
- August 20 – Madison, Wisconsin
- August 26 – Minneapolis, Minnesota

=== September 1975 ===
- September 1 – Fargo, North Dakota
- September 7 – Sioux Falls, South Dakota
- September 12 – Sioux City, Iowa
- September 16 – Des Moines, Iowa
- September 23 – Omaha, Nebraska

=== October 1975 ===
- October 2 – Colorado Springs, Colorado
- October 7 – Cheyenne, Wyoming
- October 10 – Billings, Montana
- October 15 – Salt Lake City, Utah
- October 19 – Ogden, Utah
- October 22 – Boise, Idaho
- October 26 – Spokane, Washington
- October 31 – Seattle, Washington

=== November 1975 ===
- November 5 – Tacoma, Washington
- November 11 – Portland, Oregon
- November 15 – Salem, Oregon
- November 19 – Springfield, Oregon
- November 24 – Reno, Nevada/Sparks, Nevada
- November 28 – Sacramento, California

=== December 1975 ===
- December 1 – Stockton, California
- December 5 – Oakland, California
- December 10 – San Francisco, California
- December 14 – San Jose, California
- December 19 – Fresno, California
- December 23 – Pomona, California

== 1976 ==
=== January 1976 ===
- January 2 – Santa Barbara, California
- January 5 – Long Beach, California
- January 9 – Anaheim, California
- January 14 – San Diego, California
- January 19 – San Juan Capistrano, California
- January 22 – Yuma, Arizona
- January 24 – Tempe, Arizona
- January 29 – Tucson, Arizona

=== February 1976 ===
- February 3 – Albuquerque, New Mexico
- February 6 – El Paso, Texas/Fabens, Texas
- February 7 – Odessa, Texas/Midland, Texas
- February 11 – San Antonio, Texas
- February 15 – Austin, Texas
- February 19 – Houston, Texas
- February 26 – Fort Worth, Texas
- February 29 – Dallas, Texas

=== March 1976 ===
- March 6 – Wichita Falls, Texas
- March 10 – Oklahoma City, Oklahoma
- March 15 – Tulsa, Oklahoma
- March 19 – Wichita, Kansas
- March 24 – Topeka, Kansas
- March 27 – Kansas City, Kansas
- March 31 – Jefferson City, Missouri

=== April 1976 ===
- April 4 – St. Louis, Missouri
- April 13 – North Little Rock, Arkansas
- April 17 – Memphis, Tennessee
- April 24 – Jackson, Mississippi
- April 28 – Baton Rouge, Louisiana

=== May 1976 ===
- May 3 – New Orleans, Louisiana
- May 11 – Mobile, Alabama
- May 15 – Columbus, Georgia
- May 19 – Atlanta, Georgia
- May 27 – Birmingham, Alabama
- May 31 – Huntsville, Alabama

=== June 1976 ===
- June 4 – Knoxville, Tennessee
- June 7 – Chattanooga, Tennessee
- June 12 – Lexington, Kentucky
- June 15 – Evansville, Indiana
- June 19 – Dayton, Ohio
- June 23 – Huntington, West Virginia
- June 25 – South Charleston, West Virginia
- June 29 – Cumberland, Maryland

=== July 1976 ===
- July 2 – Harrisburg, Pennsylvania
- July 7 – Pittsburgh, Pennsylvania
- July 11 – Brackenridge, Pennsylvania
- July 13 – Lock Haven, Pennsylvania
- July 14 – Williamsport, Pennsylvania
- July 17 – Binghamton, New York
- July 19 – Scranton, Pennsylvania
- July 23 – Morristown, New Jersey
- July 27 – New York, New York

=== August 1976 ===
- August 3 – Milford, Connecticut
- August 6 – Providence, Rhode Island
- August 10 – New London, Connecticut
- August 13 – Meriden, Connecticut
- August 17 – Tarrytown, New York
- August 21 – Newark, New Jersey
- August 24 – New Brunswick, New Jersey
- August 27 – Bethlehem, Pennsylvania
- August 30 – Trenton, New Jersey

=== September 1976 ===
- September 2 – Bradley Beach, New Jersey
- September 8 – Atlantic City, New Jersey
- September 12 – King of Prussia, Pennsylvania
- September 17 – Baltimore, Maryland
- September 21 – Hagerstown, Maryland
- September 25 – Washington, D.C.
- September 30 – Newport News, Virginia

=== October 1976 ===
- October 5 – Norfolk, Virginia
- October 8 – Richmond, Virginia
- October 15 – Fredericksburg, Virginia
- October 18 – Danville, Virginia
- October 20 – Greensboro, North Carolina
- October 25 – Charlotte, North Carolina
- October 29 – Raleigh, North Carolina

=== November 1976 ===
- November 3 – Greenville, South Carolina
- November 6 – Columbia, South Carolina
- November 9 – Florence, South Carolina
- November 12 – Charleston, South Carolina
- November 16 – Savannah, Georgia
- November 20 – Jacksonville, Florida
- November 26 – Tallahassee, Florida
- November 30 – Gainesville, Florida

=== December 1976 ===
- December 3 – Orlando, Florida
- December 7 – Sarasota, Florida
- December 11 – St. Petersburg, Florida
- December 16 – Lakeland, Florida
- December 21 – West Palm Beach, Florida
- December 26 – Miami, Florida
