= Chesapeake and Ohio 614 =

Preserved American 4-8-4 locomotive

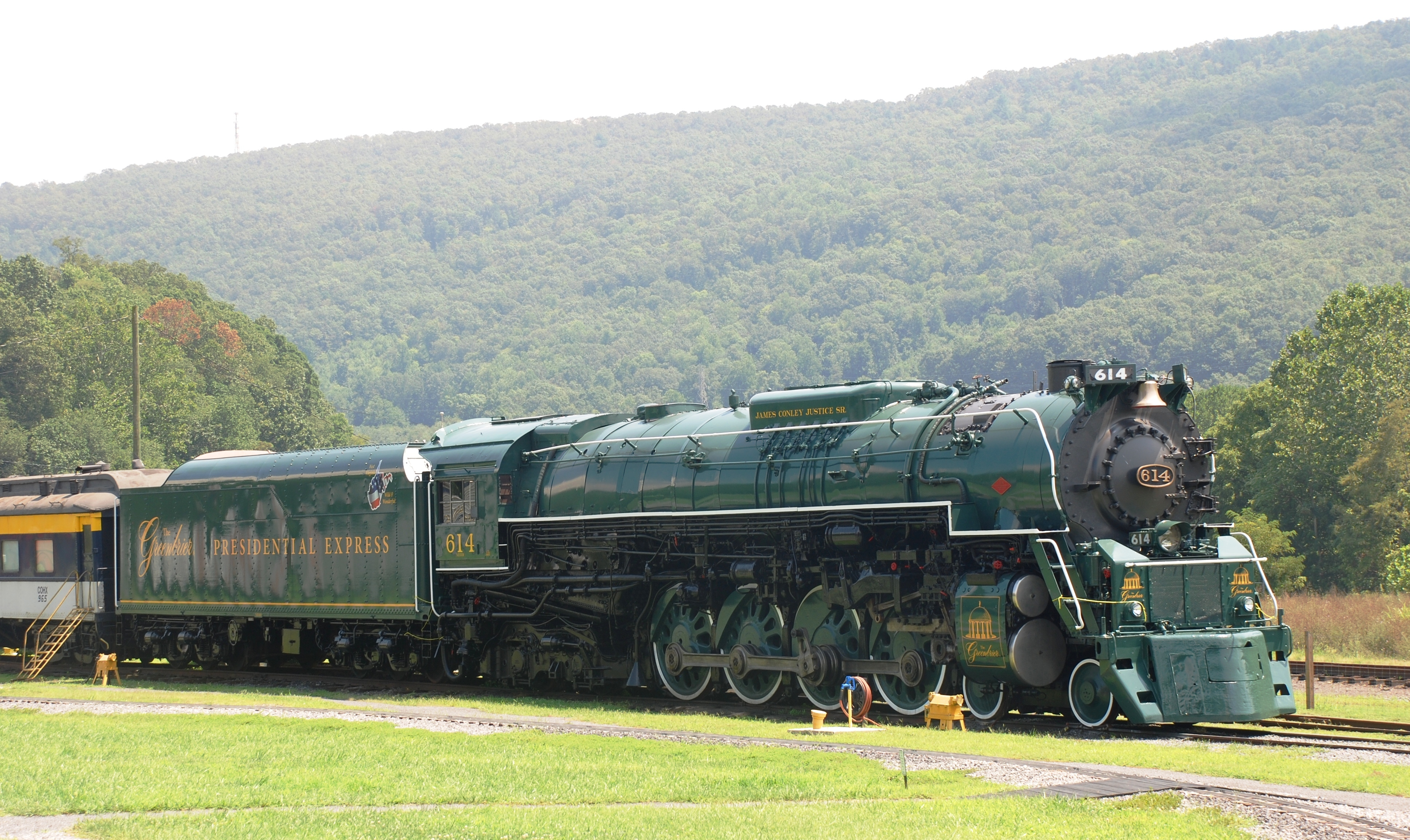
- C&O No. 614 on display in its Greenbrier Presidential Express livery, August 2, 2012
Type and origin
- Power type: Steam
- Builder: Lima Locomotive Works
- Order number: 1201
- Serial number: 9306
- Build date: June 1948
Specifications
- Configuration
  - Whyte: 4-8-4
  - UIC: 2′D2′ h2
- Gauge: 4 ft 8 1/2 in (1,435 mm) standard gauge
- Leading dia.: 38 in (965 mm)
- Driver dia.: 74 in (1,880 mm)
- Trailing dia.: 42 in (1,067 mm) (44 in (1,118 mm) on last axle)
- Tender wheels: 36 in (914 mm)
- Minimum curve: 20°
- Length
  - Over couplers: 112 ft 2 3/4 in (34.21 m)
- Height: 15 ft 8 7/8 in (4.80 m)
- Axle load: 71,700 lb (32,500 kilograms; 32.5 metric tons)
- Adhesive weight: 282,400 lb (128,100 kilograms; 128.1 metric tons)
- Loco weight: 479,400 lb (217,500 kilograms; 217.5 metric tons)
- Tender weight: 386,130 lb (175,150 kilograms; 175.15 metric tons)
- Total weight: 865,530 lb (392,600 kilograms; 392.60 metric tons)
- Fuel type: Coal
- Fuel capacity: New: 50,000 lb (23,000 kilograms; 23 metric tons); Now: 100,000 lb (45,000 kilograms; 45 metric tons)
- Water cap.: New: 21,500 US gal (81,000 L; 17,900 imp gal); Now: 18,200 US gal (69,000 L; 15,200 imp gal)
- Firebox
  - Grate area: 100.3 sq ft (9.32 m^{2})
- Boiler
  - Diameter: 100 in (2,540 mm)
  - Small tubes: 22 - 2 1/4 in (57 mm)
  - Large tubes: 220 - 3 1/2 in (89 mm)
- Boiler pressure: 255 psi (1.76 MPa)
- Feedwater heater: Hancock TA-1
- Heating surface
  - Firebox: 150 1/16 in × 96 1/4 in (3,812 mm × 2,445 mm)
  - Total surface: 6,879 sq ft (639.1 m^{2})
- Superheater
  - Type: Type E
  - Heating area: 2,058 sq ft (191.2 m^{2})
- Cylinders: Two, outside
- Cylinder size: 27 1/2 in × 30 in (698 mm × 762 mm)
- Valve gear: Baker
- Valve type: Piston valves
- Loco brake: Air
- Train brakes: Air
- Couplers: Knuckle
Performance figures
- Maximum speed: 100 mph (160 km/h)
- Power output: 3,468 hp (2,590 kW; 3,520 PS)
- Tractive effort: 66,450 lbf (295.58 kN) (With Booster: 78,850 lbf (350.74 kN))
- Factor of adh.: 4.44
Career
- Operators: Chesapeake and Ohio Railway; Steam Locomotive Corporation of America; American Coal Enterprises; Iron Horse Enterprises
- Class: J-3-A
- Number in class: 5
- Numbers: C&O 614; C&O 611; C&O 614-T
- Retired: 1955 (revenue service); 1998 (1st excursion service)
- Restored: 1980 (1st excursion service)
- Current owner: RJD America, LLC
- Disposition: Undergoing restoration to operating condition

Chesapeake and Ohio 614 is a 4-8-4 "Greenbrier" (Northern) type steam locomotive, built in June 1948 by the Lima Locomotive Works (LLW) in Lima, Ohio for the Chesapeake and Ohio Railway (C&O) as a member of the J-3-A class. As one of the last commercially built steam locomotives in the United States, the locomotive was used to haul long, heavy, high speed express passenger trains for the C&O, such as the George Washington and the Fast Flying Virginian.

Retired from active service in the mid-1950s, No. 614 was preserved and placed on display at the B&O Railroad Museum in Baltimore, Maryland. In 1979, railroad preservationist Ross Rowland purchased the locomotive and restores it to operating condition for extensive mainline excursion service from the early 1980s until the late 1990s. After almost 20 years of excursion service, the locomotive sat in storage for the next two decades whilst Rowland attempted to return the locomotive to service but was unsuccessful. From 2011 to 2025, No. 614 was on display at the C&O Railway Heritage Center in Clifton Forge, Virginia. In November 2024, the locomotive was sold to RJD America, who are currently restoring it to operating condition.

== History ==
=== Revenue service ===
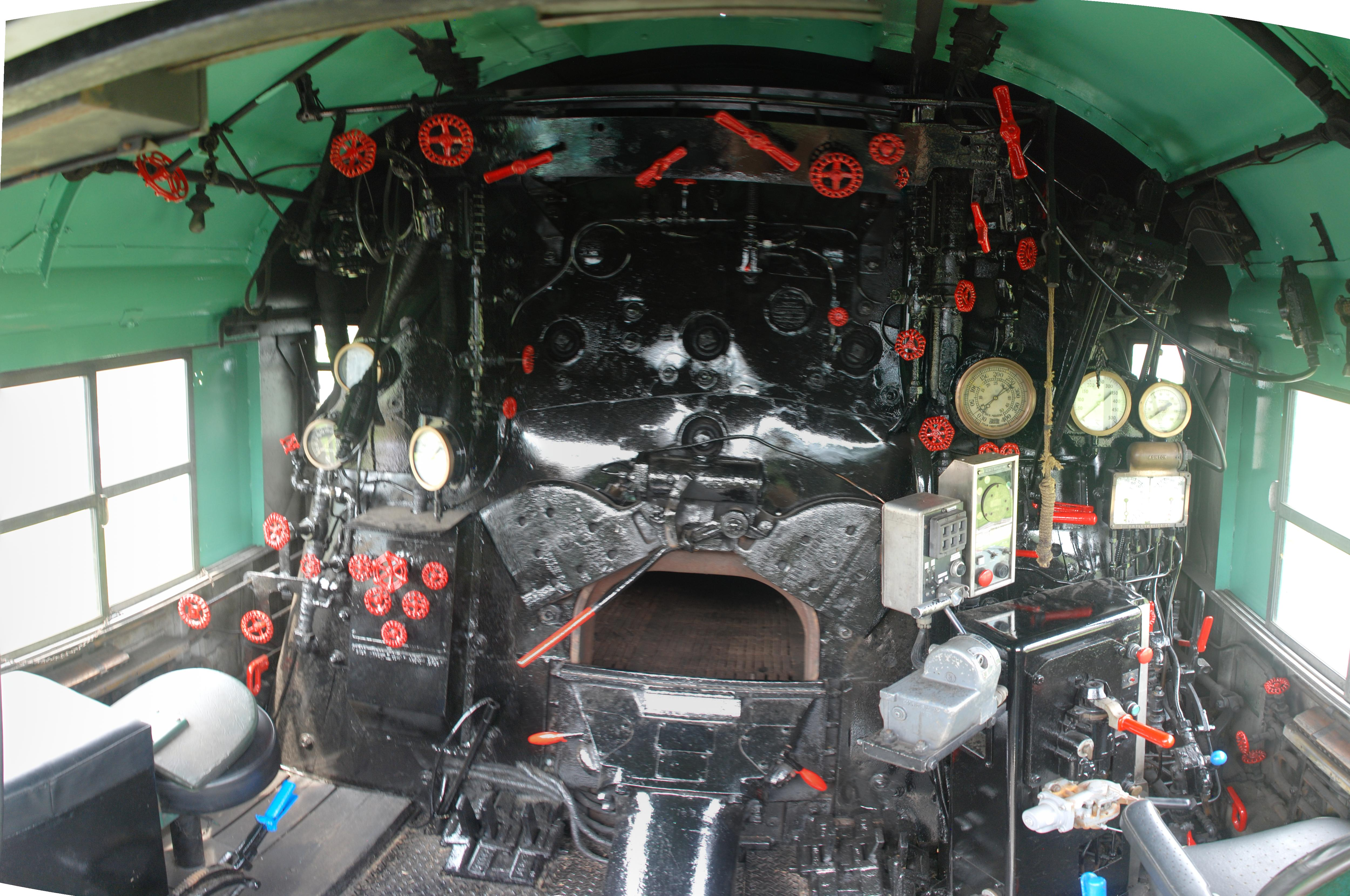
A view of the backhead inside No. 614's cab

Most railroads called their 4-8-4 Northerns, which is short for the railroad first using the 4-8-4 types, the Northern Pacific Railroad. The workers of the C&O could not see naming these locomotives "Northerns" as the railroad was based in the southeast. The famous Greenbrier Hotel in White Sulphur Springs, West Virginia, a major resort on the C&O mainline, was the inspiration for the name Greenbrier applied to these 4-8-4s.

The C&O had a total of 12 4-8-4s, with the first five numbered 600-604 built in 1935, with the designation J-3. In 1942, two more were ordered from Lima numbered 605–606. In 1948, the design changed slightly and the 610-614 were produced, with the J-3-A designation. No. 614 was originally retired in 1952, but three years later, it, as well as No. 610 were brought back into revenue service to pull heavy freight trains in favor of the upcoming freight traffic on most American railroads. While being brought back into service, however, No. 614 was renumbered to 611, since there was a power shortage on the C&O as to alleviate any confusion with some leased 4-8-4s from the Richmond, Fredericksburg and Potomac Railroad, one of which was also numbered 614. The original C&O 611 remained out of service.

After just one year of revenue freight service, No. 614 was retired again and it was placed in storage with a group of other C&O steam locomotives in the form of a ‘scrap line’ in front of the C&O diesel shops in Russell, Kentucky where it remained for almost two decades.

=== Excursion service ===
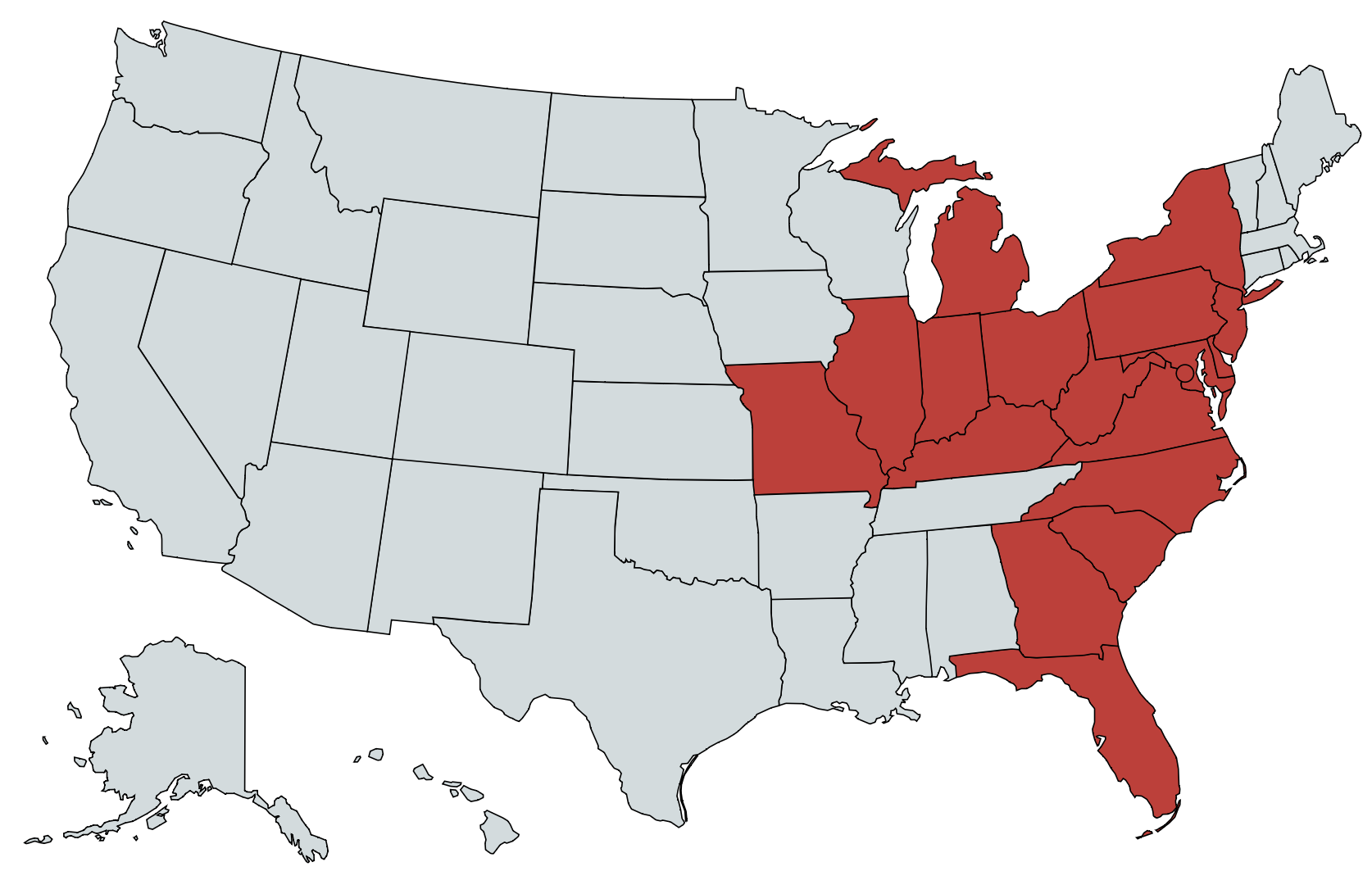
US states visited by No. 614 in excursion service

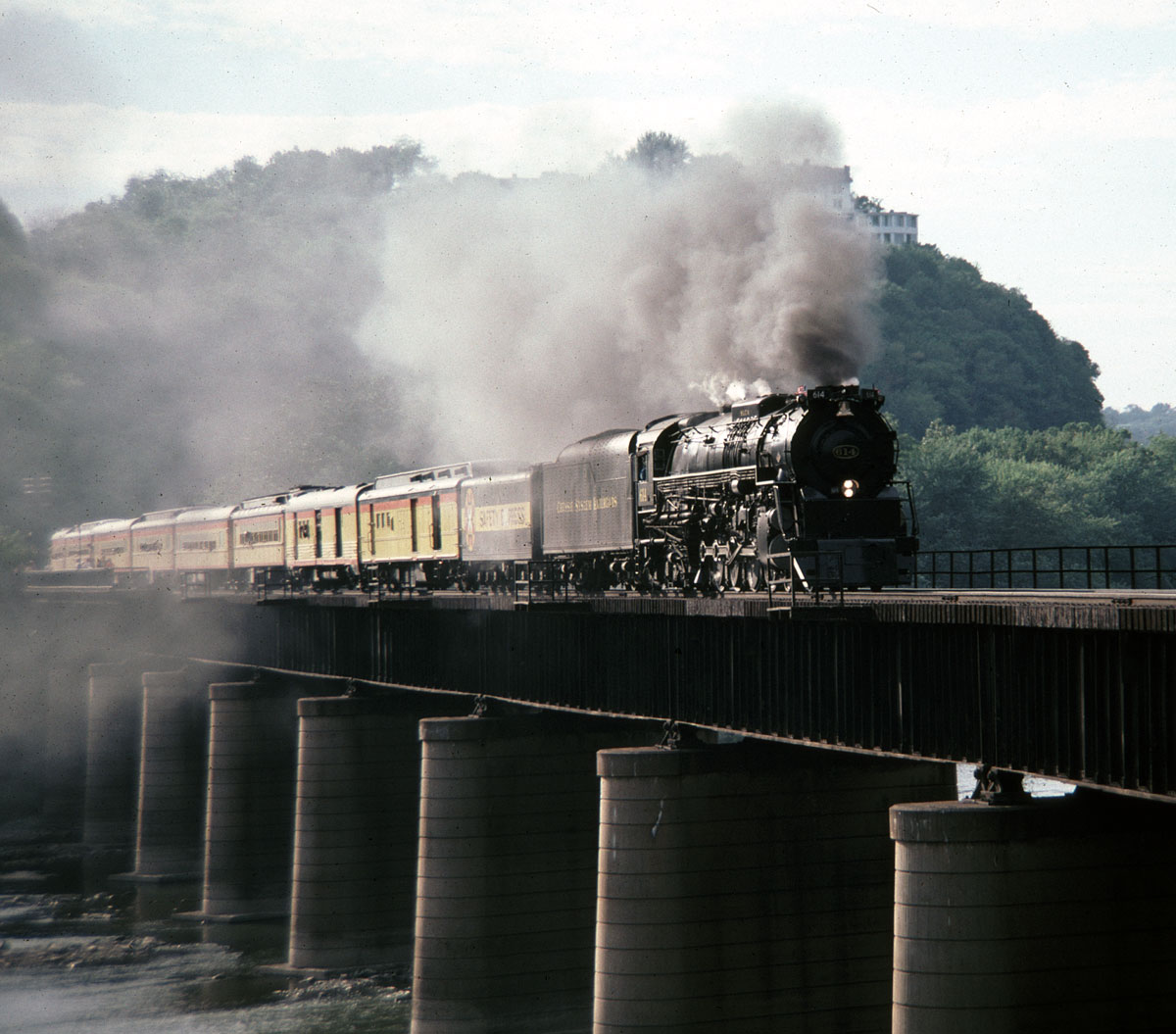
No. 614 crossing over the ex-B&O Potomac River bridge in Harpers Ferry, West Virginia, in September 1980

In 1975, No. 614, as well as 2-8-4 Kanawha No. 2705 and 2-6-6-2 No. 1309, were donated to the B&O Railroad Museum in Baltimore, Maryland and were cosmetically restored for static display.

During 1979, Ross Rowland traded Reading T1 No. 2101, which was previously damaged in a roundhouse fire, to the museum in exchange for No. 614. It was restored over the next 18 months with a cost of $1.5 million. During the restoration, No. 614 was given an auxiliary tender, doubling her water capacity to 50,000 gallons. This allowed the 614 to run for longer times without having to refuel as much. The Chessie Safety Express was No. 614's first major run, bringing her a bit of spotlight in the process. After the successful system tour, 614 was kept in the former Western Maryland roundhouse in Hagerstown, Maryland until 1985. American Coal Enterprises was developing a modern steam locomotive to be used as an alternative to rising oil costs by burning coal, known as the ACE 3000 Project. The 614 was modified for better performance under the guidance of David Wardale, and fitted with testing equipment to measure the performance of the engine. For several weeks in January and February 1985, 614 (now 614-T, symbolizing it as testing) hauled coal trains between Huntington and Hinton, West Virginia. The 614's fuel consumption costs were actually lower than most diesel locomotives operating at that time. Following the ACE 3000 coal trains, No. 614 was moved back to the Hagerstown roundhouse, where the engine sat in storage for the next few years. In 1989, Rowland offered to lease No. 614 to the Steamtown National Historic Site for excursion service. However, this offer would not be accepted, with Steamtown preferring to use its own equipment. No. 614 would reside in the Hagerstown roundhouse until 1989, when the locomotive would be relocated to a storage site in Cumberland, Maryland following an unsuccessful attempt by Rowland to save the Hagerstown roundhouse from being razed.

In 1991, No. 614 returned to its former home at the B&O Railroad Museum for temporary display. (Note: During its brief tenure on display at the B&O Railroad Museum, No. 614 was occasionally fired up and operated over the museum's property for special events.) In 1992, Rowland and Ralph Weisinger announced plans to use C&O 614 for the proposed 21st Century Limited, a cross country exhibit train to highlight the achievements and discoveries of the 20th century. (Note: New York Central 3001 was also proposed to be restored to operating condition for the 21st Century Limited project.) To give the public an idea of what the train would look like, one side of 614 was decorated in a futuristic way with a blue streamlined shrouding and centered headlight. However, the 21st Century Limited project was cancelled. In 1995, 614 was moved from the Baltimore and Ohio Railroad Museum to the New Hope and Ivyland Railroad in New Hope, Pennsylvania for a complete overhaul. It was then used for a series of popular excursions between Hoboken, New Jersey and Port Jervis, New York in conjunction with New Jersey Transit (NJT) and co-sponsored by the Volunteer Railroaders Association between 1996 and 1998.

=== 21st century hiatus and new ownership ===
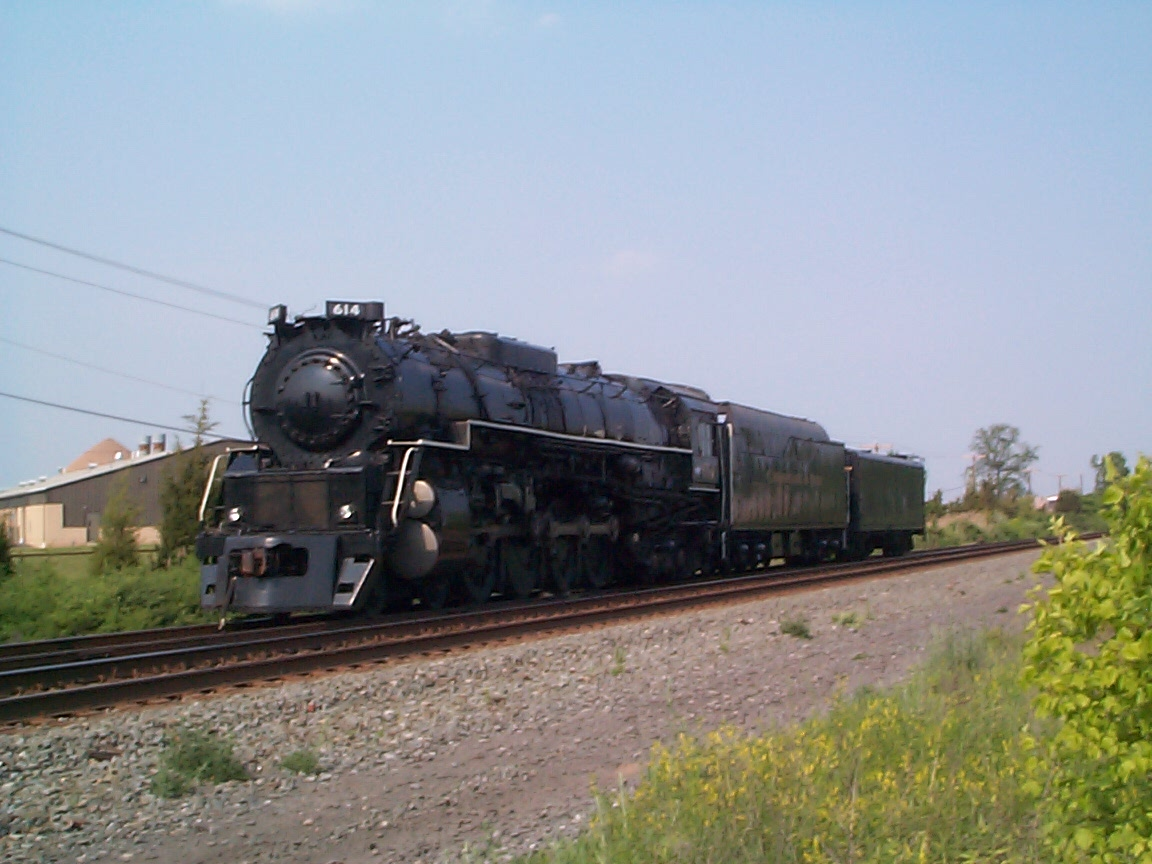
No. 614 at the westernmost end of the Royceville Runner on the way to storage in Pennsylvania

No. 614 was required to pull 26 cars at 79 mph (127 km/h) on some sections and maintain speed up several hills. During this time, No. 614 was re-equipped with cab signals, 26L brakes, speed control, an MU stand and ditch lights. Following the 1996 and 1997 excursions, Iron Horse Enterprises attempted to expand their excursion program with 614 beyond the NJT trackage. Iron Horse Enterprises discussed excursion plans with several different railroads including the Florida East Coast Railway, Bangor & Aroostook, Conrail and Amtrak. However, none of the plans came to fruition.

In 2000, Rowland put the No. 614 locomotive up for auction at the NJT maintenance facility, but no buyers were interested. The locomotive was last fired up in 2001 at the NJ Transit shop. In 2002, a deal was reached to sell No. 614 to Andrew Muller of the Reading and Northern Railroad and was moved to storage in Port Clinton, Pennsylvania. However, the deal would not proceed and Rowland retained ownership of the locomotive.

In 2010, discussions began between Rowland and Jim Justice, owner of the Greenbrier Resort in White Sulfur Springs, West Virginia, and then governor of West Virginia. The resort owner had been interested in running steam-powered excursion trains from Greenbrier to Washington DC. To be known as the "Greenbrier Express", Justice planned to use steam and diesel power in the project but would have needed cooperation from CSX Transportation, the Buckingham Branch Railroad and Amtrak. In January 2011, the No. 614 locomotive was moved to the Virginia Museum of Transportation in Roanoke, Virginia for its Thoroughbreds of Steam exhibit. In May 2011, the 614 was again moved to the C&O Railway Heritage Center in Clifton Forge, Virginia. From there, it was repainted in preparation for display for the Greenbrier Presidential Express.

However, the Greenbrier Express project was cancelled in May 2012 due to lack of funding and capacity problems on the CSX portion of the route, where a lack of passing sidings makes it difficult for eastbound trains to gain headway against the flow of westbound empty coal trains. The diesels and passenger cars were auctioned off and the 614 remained on static display at Clifton Forge for many years. On November 8, 2024, it was announced that Rowland sold No. 614 to RJD America of Denville, New Jersey and would be restoring it to operating condition. On June 7, 2025, No. 614 was moved out of the C&O Heritage Center and arrived at the Strasburg Rail Road in Strasburg, Pennsylvania the next day, being towed by Great Western 90 from the interchange at Leaman Place to the SRC's workshop. Restoration work of No. 614 began on June 9, 2025.

== Bibliography ==
- Nuckles, Douglas; Dixon, Thomas (1994). Chesapeake & Ohio Greenbrier Type 4-8-4 Locomotives. Clifton Forge, Virginia: The Chesapeake & Ohio Historical Society. ISBN 0-939487-18-7.
