= Ross Rowland =

American railroad preservationist (1940–2025)

- Rowland in the 1990s
- Born: Ross Ellsworth Rowland Jr. July 11, 1940; Albany, New York, U.S.
- Died: July 19, 2025 (aged 85); Sackets Harbor, New York, U.S.
- Occupation: Railroad preservationist
- Years active: 1959–2025
- Organizations: High Iron Company; American Freedom Train Foundation; Steam Locomotive Corporation of America; American Coal Enterprises; Iron Horse Enterprises

Ross E. Rowland Jr. (July 11, 1940 – July 19, 2025) was an American railroad preservationist. From the 1960s to the 1990s, he ran public and demonstration excursions on existing railroads, utilizing steam locomotives.

== Early life and financial career ==
Rowland was born in Albany, New York on July 11, 1940. His family relocated to Cranford, New Jersey, in 1945, where Ross frequently visited a local railroad roundhouse as a child. Rowland's father, grandfather and great-grandfather all had railroad careers on the Baltimore & Ohio (B&O) and Jersey Central (CNJ) railroads, which contributed to Ross's interest in trains as a child. At the age of 14, Rowland ran away from his family home in 1954 to hitchhike following a dispute with his parents. After returning to Cranford, eventually a local friend would invite Ross at the age of 17 to start a career in the futures exchanges in New York City. In 1966, Rowland founded Floor Broker Associates Inc. He also served on the board of COMEX, a precious metals investment firm. Rowland would work in commodities for 33 years prior to retiring.

== Steam excursion career ==
In the 1950s and early 1960s, Rowland was involved with the New Jersey Museum of Transportation and the Black River & Western Railroad. However, Rowland grew bored of both operations, deeming that they did not allow him to fulfill his desire to run mainline excursions. On October 16, 1966, Rowland began operating steam excursion trains with his newly-formed High Iron Company (HICO), and the first train was arranged as a collaboration with Steamtown, U.S.A. owner F. Nelson Blount, and hauled by Canadian Pacific 1278.

Rowland subsequently hosted several more steam-powered trains, including the Golden Spike Centennial Limited train in 1969. Rowland's most famous accomplishment was the American Freedom Train, a steam-powered exhibit train which toured much of the continental US over 1975 and 1976 in conjunction with the celebration of the United States Bicentennial. Rowland's actions in setting up the American Freedom Train would lead to him being awarded an honorary lifetime membership in the Brotherhood of Locomotive Engineers and Trainmen.

The American Freedom Train was met by some protest, particularly from American Indian Movement and People's Bicentennial Commission activists concerned about inadequate coverage on the train regarding African American and Native American history. Rowland responded to the criticism by offering a tour to some protestors while stating "We only have 700 linear feet, so we can't do everyone satisfactory."

Following the American Freedom Train, Rowland would operate the Chessie Steam Special, to celebrate the 150th anniversary of the Baltimore and Ohio Railroad from 1977 to 1978 and the Chessie Safety Express to promote grade-crossing safety from 1980 to 1981.

Rowland had been connected with and operated several U.S. excursion steam locomotives, including Nos. 1278, 1238, 1286, Nickel Plate Road 759, Reading 2101, and Chesapeake and Ohio 614.

=== ACE 3000 Project ===
During the 1980s, with a spike in oil prices, Rowland was instrumental in forming American Coal Enterprises, an organization dedicated to the design and production of modern, coal-fired, reciprocating, direct-drive steam locomotives designed to reduce or eliminate operational concerns associated with steam locomotives and to operate with enough efficiency to be economically viable to railroads. Rowland managed to obtain permission from CSX Transportation to operate C&O 614 in freight service in 1985, to obtain data in order to finalize the ACE 3000 design. The ACE 3000 originally started development as a steam turbine locomotive design, but was changed to a traditional reciprocating drive as development continued.

A preliminary design for the ACE 3000 was developed, but active development stopped prior to any effort to build a demonstrator or prototype when oil prices fell in the mid-1980s, and it appeared that the disparity between coal and oil would not be sustained at a level significant enough to expect that a coal-fired locomotive would be economically feasible.

=== 21st Century Limited ===
In 1992, Rowland along with Ralph Weisinger proposed the 21st Century Limited, a theme train to highlight the achievements and discoveries of the 20th century hauled by C&O 614 and NYC 3001 with custom railcars and displays. Rowland initially projected the train would run by 1996, and 614 was briefly wrapped in the colors of the train for a photoshoot to advertise the project. Rowland sought out several sponsors for the train and was able to sign Chrysler as a sponsor. The project would eventually be cancelled.

From 1996 to 1998, Rowland operated public excursions with C&O 614 on New Jersey Transit between Hoboken and Port Jervis. Rowland had been a critic of the efficiency and effectiveness of the Steamtown National Historic Site.

== Pacific Wilderness tourist train ==
In the summers of 2000 and 2001, Rowland managed the Pacific Wilderness Railway (PAW) on Vancouver Island, British Columbia. This short-lived tourist train consisted of a few older coaches pulled by 2 GP20 diesels leased from the Ohio Central Railroad, traveling from Victoria to the peak of Malahat before returning to Victoria. The operation was criticized for lacking any proper station or accommodations at Malahat, and a lack of scenic sights along the route. Further criticism highlighted the age of the rolling stock, a failure to attract cruise traffic such as the success of Alaska's White Pass and Yukon Route, and the failure to bring in an operating steam engine due to weight limits on bridges over the PAW line. The operation failed, and ended in July 2001.

== Later career ==
From 2007 to 2017, Rowland promoted the concept of a "Yellow Ribbon Express" for the benefit of the Wounded Warrior Project. In early 2011, Rowland announced the planned operation of the Greenbrier Presidential Express, a luxury train set to operate from Washington, D.C. to the Greenbrier Resort in White Sulphur Springs, WV. However, problems with capacity on the Buckingham Branch Railroad and with steam operation into Washington, D.C. ceased the project's feasibility. By 2014, many of the passenger cars bought for the Greenbrier Express were sold at auction, bringing an end to the project.

In 2000, Ross attempted to sell C&O 614 at auction, however no buyers surfaced. In 2002 it was announced Andrew J. Muller of the Reading Blue Mountain and Northern Railroad had purchased the locomotive from Rowland, however this deal would later fall apart and Rowland retained ownership of the locomotive. C&O 614 was moved from storage in Pennsylvania to static display at the Virginia Museum of Transportation in 2011. It was later moved to display in Clifton Forge, Virginia, at the C&O Railway Heritage Center, where it was displayed wearing the green paint scheme of the failed Greenbrier Express project.

In 2016, Ross Rowland founded a new "American Freedom Train Foundation" to promote a 2026 Freedom Train concept for the United States Semiquincentennial. Criticism of the American Freedom Train 2026 and the prior Yellow Ribbon Express has come from railfans who have speculated they were projects whose primary goal was to fundraise money for restoration of Rowland's C&O 614. Rowland volunteered to portray Santa Claus in a 2018 Toys for Tots train event. Rowland frequently operated as a guest steam locomotive engineer at the New Hope Railroad, and was an avid boater as well until selling his ship the Hustler in 2021. In 2021, Rowland received a lifetime achievement award from the HeritageRail Alliance.

In November 2024, Rowland sold C&O 614 to RJD America, with Rowland noting his desire to see the locomotive in steam again. It was moved to the Strasburg Railroad on June 8, 2025, and was towed by Great Western 90 from the interchange at Leaman Place, Pennsylvania to the SRC's workshop where it will be restored to operating condition.

== Death ==
On July 19, 2025, Rowland died at his home in Sackets Harbor, New York, at the age of 85, from lung cancer.
