= Leaman Place, Pennsylvania =

Unincorporated community in Pennsylvania, US

- Unincorporated community
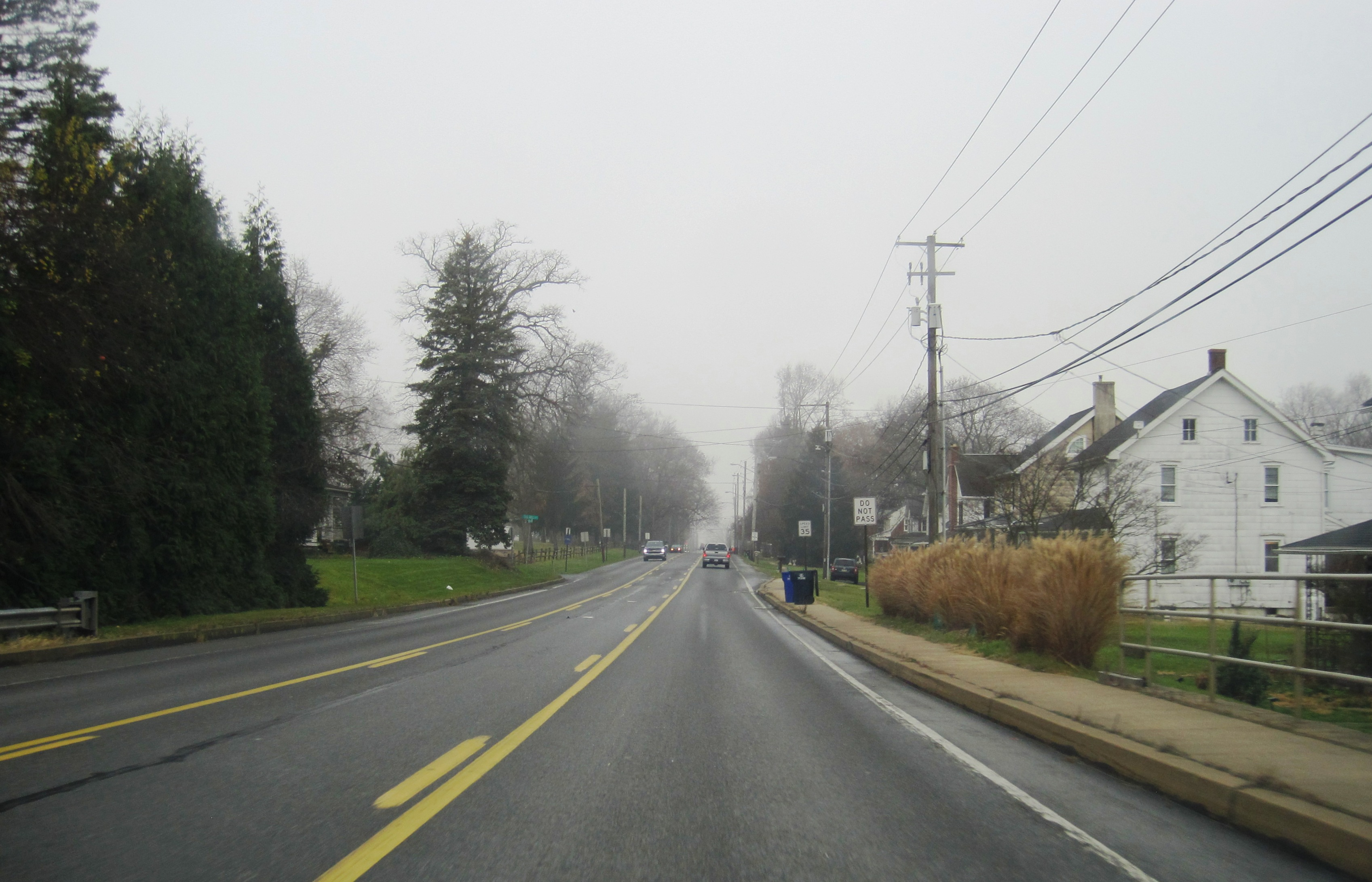
- Westbound US 30 through Leaman Place

- Location in Pennsylvania Location in the United States
- Coordinates: 40°0′26″N 76°7′0″W
- Country: United States
- State: Pennsylvania
- County: Lancaster
- Township: Paradise
- Time zone: UTC-5 (Eastern (EST))
  - Summer (DST): UTC-4 (EDT)

Leaman Place is a named place in Lancaster County, Pennsylvania, United States. Leaman Place is known mostly as a whistle-stop. President-elect Abraham Lincoln spoke at this station on February 22, 1861 to a crowd of 5,000. In 1968, Hubert H. Humphrey, Democratic Party candidate for president, stopped and spoke at the same place.

The Leaman Place covered bridge crosses Pequea Creek.

== Geography ==
Leaman Place is located at 40°0′26″N 76°7′0″W (40.007222, -76.116667), and is 385 feet above mean sea level.
