= Reading Class T-1 =

Class of 30 American 4-8-4 locomotives

Reading T-1 (Rebuilt : 30 : I-10sa 2-8-0)
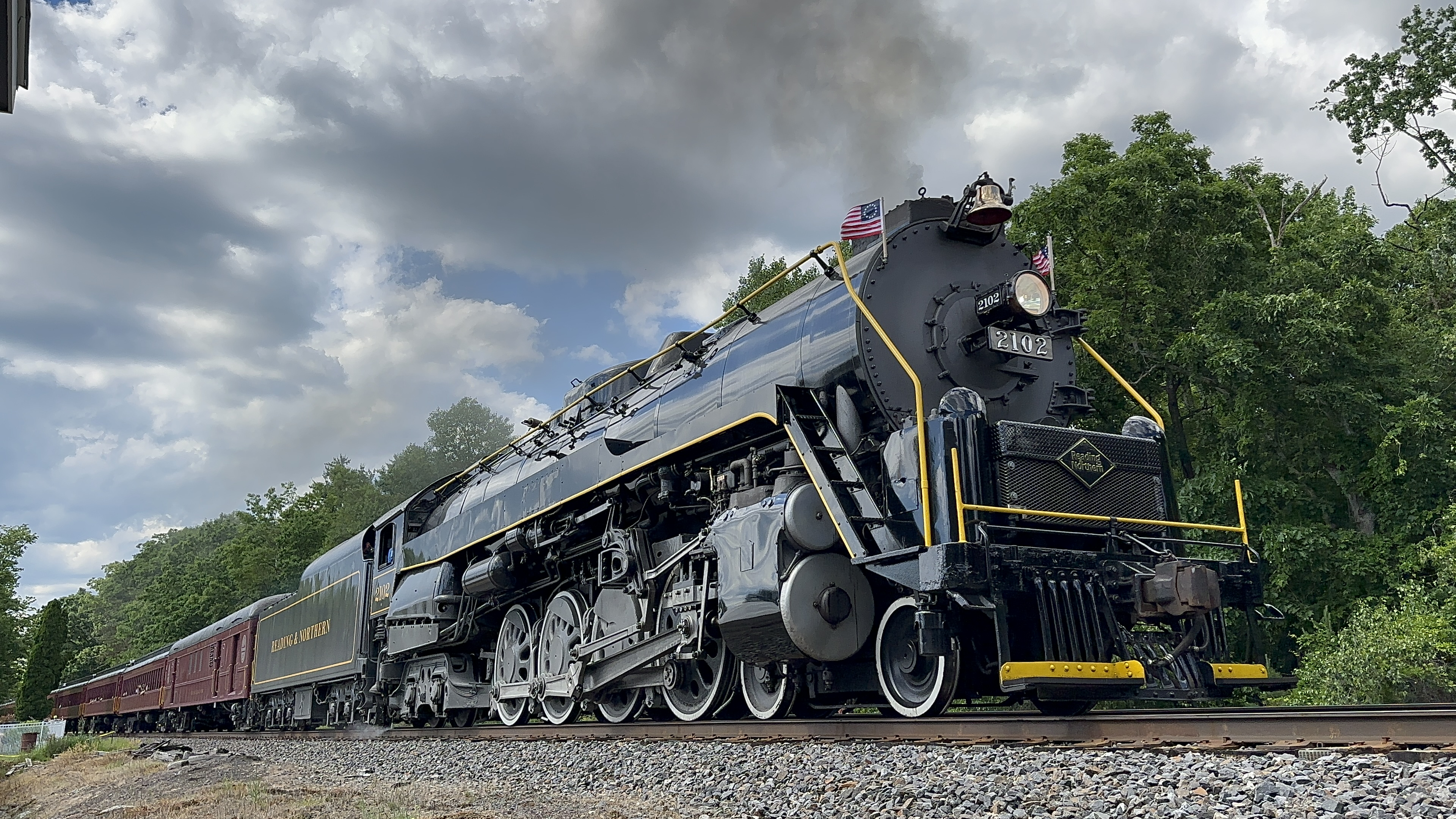
- Reading 2102 rolls through Kirby Avenue in Mountain Top, PA on June 13, 2026
Type and origin
- Power type: Steam
- Builder: Baldwin Locomotive Works
- Build date: 1923-1925 (as a 2-8-0 "Consolidation" type #2020-2049)
- Total produced: 30
- Rebuilder: Reading Company
- Rebuild date: 1945–1947 (conversion to 4-8-4 "Northern" type renumbered 2100-2129)
- Number rebuilt: 30 out of 50 (I-10sa 2-8-0 Consolidation)
Specifications
- Configuration
  - Whyte: New: 2-8-0; Rebuilt: 4-8-4
- Gauge: 4 ft 8 1/2 in (1,435 mm) standard gauge
- Leading dia.: 36 in (914 mm)
- Driver dia.: 70 in (1,778 mm)
- Trailing dia.: 44 in (1,118 mm)
- Length: 110 ft 6 in (33.68 m)
- Height: 15 ft 2 in (4.62 m)
- Axle load: 69,550 lb (34.78 short tons)
- Adhesive weight: 278,200 lb (139.1 short tons)
- Loco weight: 441,300 lb (220.7 short tons)
- Tender weight: 367,700 lb (183.9 short tons)
- Total weight: 809,000 lb (404 short tons)
- Fuel type: Anthracite / Bituminous coal mix
- Fuel capacity: 52,000 lb (26 short tons)
- Water cap.: 19,000 US gallons (72,000 L; 16,000 imp gal)
- Firebox
  - Grate area: 94.5 sq ft (8.78 m^{2})
- Boiler: 96 in (2,438 mm)
- Boiler pressure: 240 lbf/in^{2} (1.65 MPa)
- Superheater: Type A
- Cylinders: Two, outside
- Cylinder size: 27 in × 32 in (686 mm × 813 mm)
- Valve gear: Walschaerts
- Valve type: Piston valves
- Loco brake: Air
- Train brakes: Air
- Couplers: Knuckle
Performance figures
- Power output: 5,500 hp (4,100 kW)
- Tractive effort: Loco: 68,000 lbf (302.5 kN); Booster: 11,100 lbf (49.4 kN); Total: 79,100 lbf (351.9 kN)
- Factor of adh.: Loco: 4.09; Booster: 4.33
Career
- Operators: Reading Company, Reading, Blue Mountain and Northern (1985-1991, 2022-present (2102)
- Class: New: I-10sa; Rebuilt: T-1
- Number in class: Thirty
- Nicknames: T-Hog
- Retired: 1954 - 1957 (revenue); 1964 (rambles excursion)
- Preserved: Four (Nos. 2100, 2101, 2102 and 2124) preserved
- Disposition: Nos. 2100 and No. 2102 are operational, Nos. 2101 and 2124 on static display, remainder scrapped

The Reading T-1 is a class of 4-8-4 "Northern" type steam locomotives owned by the Reading Company. They were rebuilt from thirty "I-10sa" class 2-8-0 "Consolidation" type locomotives between 1945 and 1947. Out of the thirty rebuilt, four survive in preservation today, those being numbers 2100, 2101, 2102, and 2124, of which 2100 and 2102 are operational.

== Construction and Design ==
Between 1923 and 1925, the Baldwin Locomotive Works constructed fifty I-10sa class locomotives (Nos. 2000-2049) for the Reading Company (RDG) in Pennsylvania. The I-10sa’s generated a tractive effort of over 71,000 pounds (32 tonnes), as compared to 19,390 pounds (8.80 tonnes) of the railroad's 2-8-0s built in the 19th century. The consolidations were solely used for heavy freight service on the RDG's branch lines, as well as the mainline on occasion.

Prior to the end of World War II, the RDG decided to create larger and more powerful locomotives than their 2-8-0, 2-8-2, and 2-10-2 locomotives to haul their growing freight traffic. While the war was nearing its end, the War Production Board denied the RDG from building a new locomotive design, but they allowed them to rebuild or modify their existing locomotives. The RDG's then-president, Revelle W. Brown, took inspiration from his previous experience on the Lehigh Valley Railroad, and he wanted the RDG to roster a fleet of 4-8-4s similar to the Lehigh Valley's 4-8-4 locomotives. Between 1945 and 1947, the RDG moved thirty of their I-10sa class consolidations (Nos. 2020-2049) to their locomotive shops in Reading, Pennsylvania.

From these thirty I-10sa Consolidations, the Reading re-used, primarily, two or three boiler courses, the cabs, and Wootten fireboxes from the examples set aside; with the vast majority of the remaining components for the locomotive being constructed by the Baldwin Locomotive Works in their Eddystone plant. The new batch of Northerns were classified as T-1s, renumbered to 2100-2129. The RDG's locomotive and rolling equipment superintendent, E. Paul Gangewere, worked with designers from the Baldwin Locomotive Works to plan out the rebuilding process. Other than those major components previously listed, other minor parts from the original I-10sa's were salvaged and reused for construction of the new T-1 locomotives this being the grate rigging, the air pumps, the water gauges, the safety valves, the headlights, the whistles, and the bells.

Some other components of the I-10sa's were reused on other small locomotives, such as the 61 1/2-inch (1,560 mm) driving wheels being reused for the I-9sb class. Baldwin supplied various new components to the RDG's locomotive shops, including the 70-inch (1,800 mm) driving wheels and various extension parts used to expand the boilers of the new T-1's. New cast steel underframes, which weighed 60,000 pounds (27 tonnes) apiece, were supplied by General Steel Castings of Eddystone.

Roller bearings supplied by Timken or SKF were used on the four-wheel pilot and trailing trucks, as well as the six-wheel tender trucks. The first twenty locomotives (Nos. 2100–2119) used plain journal bearings on the eight driving wheels, while the final ten (Nos. 2120–2129), which were intended as dual service locomotives, had roller bearings throughout.

== Service ==
The T-1 class entered service between 1945 and 1947 and were used primarily in fast freight service, and their operating territory encompassed most of the RDG system, including the railroad's mainline and some branch lines in Pennsylvania and New Jersey. The T-1's were quickly deemed successful locomotives. The T-1's were primarily used to pull time-sensitive mixed freight trains and coal trains, and some locomotives were used for pusher service. The T-1's were also frequently used in pool service in Maryland with the Western Maryland Railway—it led to them becoming the basis for the Western Maryland's "Potomac" class of 4-8-4s.

In revenue service, the T-1's were cleared to pull trains up to 150 cars in length, and they were allowed to travel as fast as 65 miles per hour (105 km/h); the RDG tested some T-1's to pull 200 cars. While they were primarily designed for freight service, the T-1's were also able to pull heavy passenger trains, if needed, and Nos. 2120-2124 were equipped with steam heating for this purpose; cab signals were also applied to some locomotives for use on the Bethlehem Branch in 1948. During revenue service, the T-1's rarely pulled passenger trains beyond post–World War II troop trains.

As steam locomotives that were manufactured in the mid-1940s, the T-1's were only used in revenue service for less than ten years before the end of revenue steam operations on the RDG, with all thirty 4-8-4's being withdrawn by 1954. A traffic surge in 1956 briefly brought some back in service. Nine T-1's (Nos. 2107, 2111-2115, 2119, and 2128) were leased to the Pennsylvania Railroad (PRR), while others ran upstate in Pennsylvania on the RDG, until early 1957. Some T-1s were also loaned as steam generators to steel mills. Upon returning to the RDG the following year, the PRR-leased locomotives, with the exception of No. 2128, were dismantled for scrap.

== Iron Horse Rambles ==
By the summer of 1958, the RDG had still rostered twenty of their thirty T-1's, and railfans were keen on seeing some of the T-1's operate again. On May 2, 1959, the New Jersey Chapter of the National Railway Historical Society (NRHS) and the New York Division of the Railway Enthusiasts sponsored a diesel-powered excursion fan trip from Jersey City, New Jersey to Reading, and photographers were allowed to take photos of T-1's in storage.

The RDG subsequently made pragmatic considerations of running their own steam excursion program that consisted of some T-1 locomotives, and with approval of then-president Joseph A. Fisher, the railroad decided to run a program all by themselves with maximum control and self-benefit. The new program, which was to be dubbed the "Iron Horse Rambles", was to be primarily run by the RDG's passenger department, their fully-staffed public relations department, and executives from other departments to ensure safe and luxurious operations. Four T-1 locomotives were selected for the Rambles; Nos. 2100 and 2124 were to be used to pull the trains, No. 2101 was set aside as back-up power, and No. 2123 was cannibalized for spare parts.

No. 2124 pulled the RDG's first Ramble train on October 25, 1959, from Wayne Junction in Philadelphia to Shamokin, Pennsylvania, and 950 passengers were on board that day. Fifty Ramble excursions would follow suit within the next four years, and they consisted of Fall Foliage excursions and tours of the Civil War battlefield at Gettysburg; the latter was the most common out of sixteen destinations the Rambles took place. In 1962, No. 2124's flue time expired, and it was sold off while a fifth T-1, No. 2102, took its place. Since 1960, the RDG had begun to run into financial troubles, and since maintenance on the T-1's were becoming expensive, the railroad had to discontinue the Iron Horse Rambles.

The final Rambles excursion run was originally scheduled October 19, 1963, but due to drought weather conditions, state authorities asked for the excursion to be pulled by diesels, instead, and one of the T-1's was fired up for display at the Reading shops for the passengers. As a compensation for the unexpected change, the RDG scheduled some more Rambles for 1964. The final Rambles excursion officially took place on October 17, 1964, between Philadelphia and Tamaqua. Fifty-one Rambles took place over five years, having carried around 50,000 passengers while attracting many bystanders.

== Preservation ==
All four of the T-1's used in the Iron Horse Rambles excursion service are preserved, and they are the only remaining examples of the class.

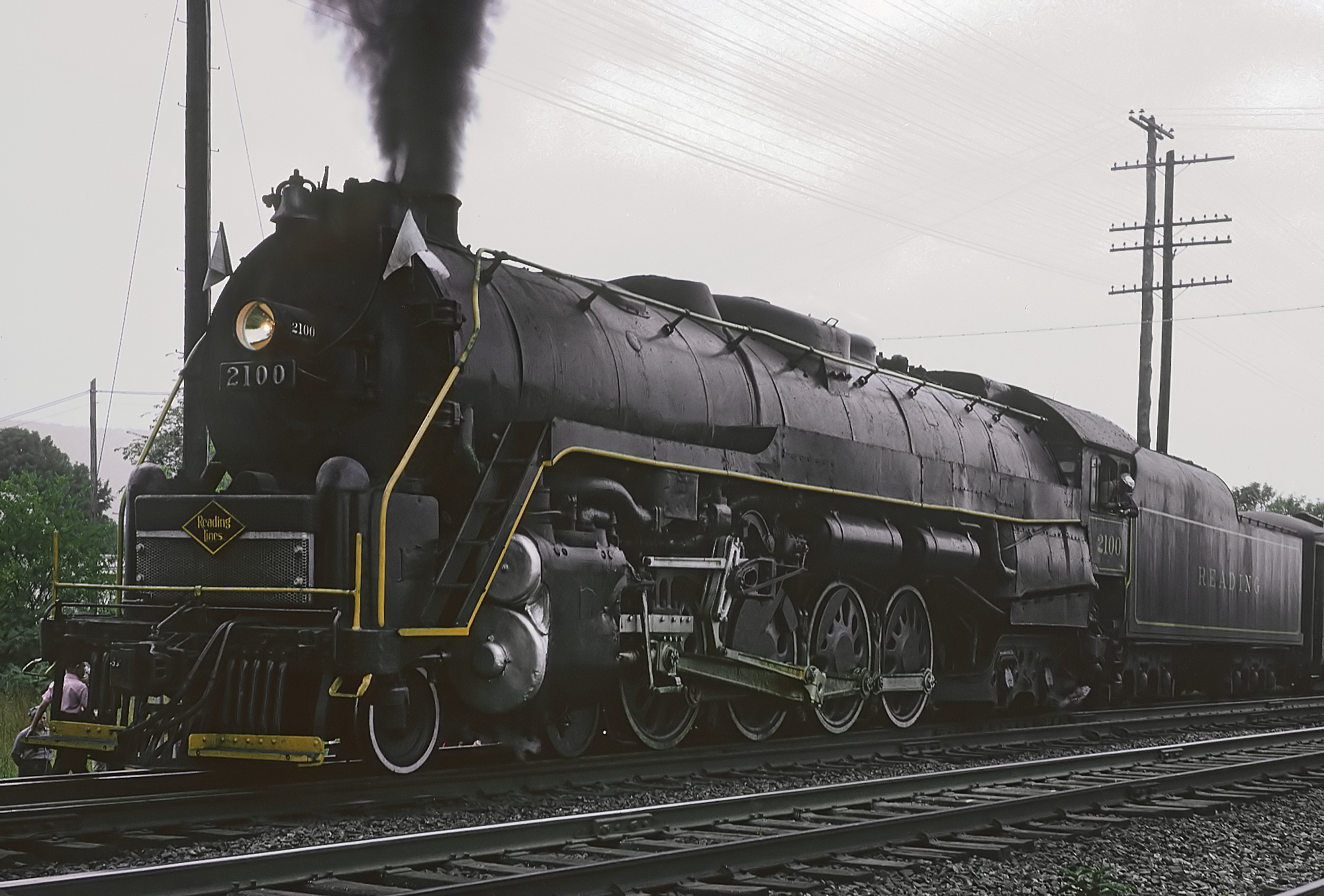
No. 2100 during one of its last runs for the Reading Rambles in September 1964

2100 was sold to Streigel Equipment & Supply of Baltimore, Maryland in September 1967. It spent almost a decade in the firm's scrapyard until 1975, when it was purchased along with sister 2101 by Ross Rowland to be used as a source of spare parts for the former for his American Freedom Train. After 2101 was damaged in a fire in 1979, 2100 swapped tenders with its sister and was stored in the former Western Maryland Hagerstown, Maryland roundhouse until 1988, when a group called the 2100 corporation, which was led by Rowland and owner of Lionel Trains Richard Kughn, restored it to operating condition. They only used 2100 to run on the Winchester and Western before it was eventually donated to the Portage Area Regional Transportation Authority, who in turn put it up for auction. Jerry Jacobson, who briefly test ran it on his Ohio Central Railroad, placed a bid on the locomotive, but he lost in 1998 to Thomas Payne. Payne moved 2100 to the former New York Central's St. Thomas, Ontario, Canada, shop, where it was converted to burn oil, with plans to use the locomotive to pull excursions throughout the Rocky Mountains. These plans never came to fruition, and in 2007, 2100 was moved to Tacoma, Washington where it briefly ran on the Golden Pacific Railroad's Tacoma Sightseer trains until 2008, when it was placed in outdoor storage in Richland, Washington. In 2015, 2100 was leased to the American Steam Railroad Preservation Association and moved to the former B&O roundhouse in Cleveland, Ohio where it was restored to operational condition.

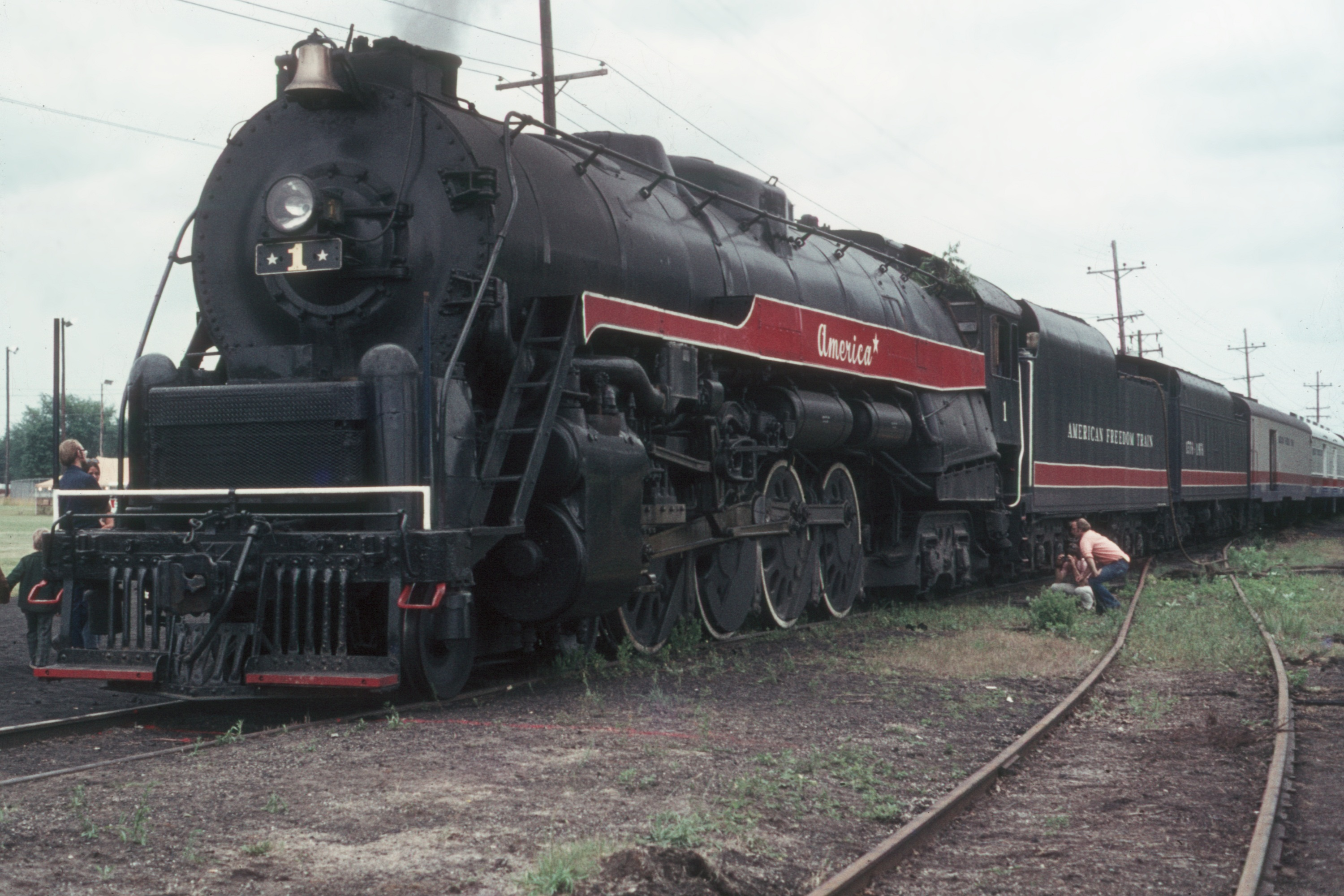
No. 2101 in its American Freedom Train livery with the consist as No. 1 at Notre Dame, Indiana on July 13, 1975

2101 was sold along with 2100 in September 1967 to Streigel Equipment & Supply of Baltimore, Maryland. It spent almost a decade in the firm's scrapyard until 1975, when it was purchased along with sister 2100 by Ross Rowland for use on his upcoming American Freedom Train, and subsequently renumbered to AFT 1. Restored to operating condition in 30 days, AFT 1 pulled the American Freedom Train throughout the eastern United States before handing the train over to ex-Southern Pacific 4449. In 1977, AFT 1 was renumbered back to 2101 and painted in the Chessie System livery for the Chessie Steam Special, an excursion train to celebrate the 150th birthday of the Baltimore and Ohio Railroad. 2101 ran these trips until November 1978. On March 6, 1979, it was damaged in a roundhouse fire at Stevens Yard in Silver Grove, Kentucky. The Chessie System arranged a deal with Rowland and traded their Chesapeake and Ohio 614 for the 2101, which was cosmetically restored as AFT 1 for static display at the B&O Railroad Museum in Baltimore. On January 12, 2026, 2101 was cosmetically restored again in its AFT scheme and made its public debut that day.

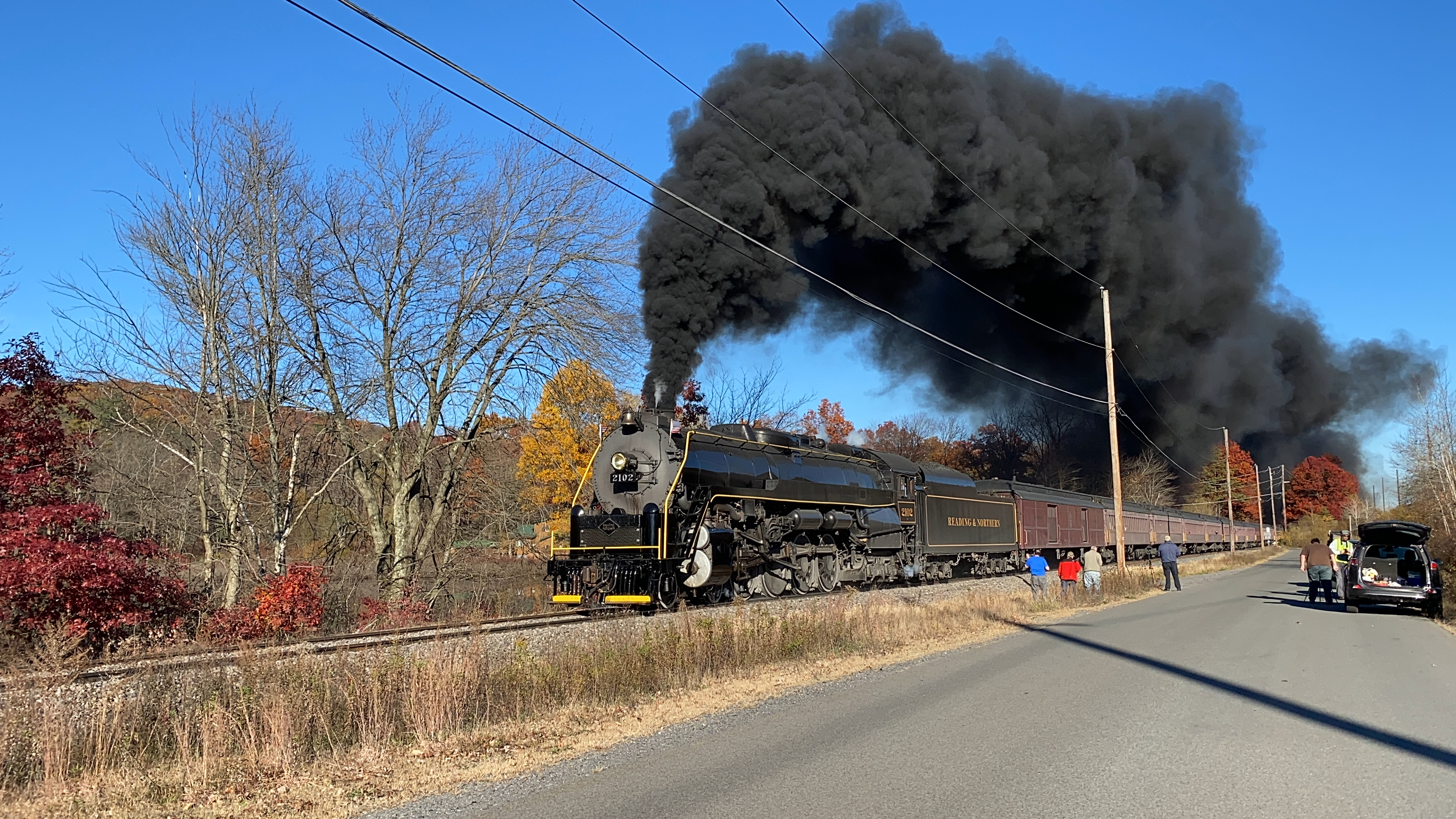
No. 2102 running through Lake Hauto on October 29, 2022 with a Fall Foliage excursion

2102 was sold to Bill Benson of Steam Tours of Akron, Ohio in 1966 and spent the next 23 years running on various fan trips in the Northeast, Mid-Atlantic and Midwest and made a brief appearance on the Greenbrier Scenic Railroad running between Durbin and Cass, West Virginia. In 1985, 2102 was moved to Reading, Pennsylvania by the RCT&HS and used on their "40th Anniversary of the Reading T-1 series of Iron Horse Rambles" on Conrail former Reading Trackage. In May 1986, 2102 was purchased by Andy Muller for his Blue Mountain and Reading Railroad in Hamburg, Pennsylvania. 2102 spent the next six years pulling tourist trains on the BM&R as well as occasional off-line trips until its flue time expired in 1991. In 1995, 2102 was moved to Steamtown National Historic Site for a restoration which never occurred and was returned to Reading and Northern at Port Clinton, Pennsylvania in 1997 and was stored inside the Reading Blue Mountain and Northern Railroad's steam shop in Port Clinton, Pennsylvania, occasionally being brought out for display by the Port Clinton Station. In January 2016. Reading Blue Mountain and Northern started a mechanical evaluation on the locomotive to see if it was in a suitable condition for restoration, and soon after announced the locomotive would be returned to service. 2102 was fired up for the first time in 30 years in January, 2021, and on April 6, 2022, the locomotive made its first test runs, restored to the black and yellow Iron Horse Rambles livery with Reading & Northern lettering. The 2102 made its excursion debut on May 28, 2022, hauling a 19 coach Iron Horse Rambles excursion between Reading Outer Station and Jim Thorpe, Pennsylvania.

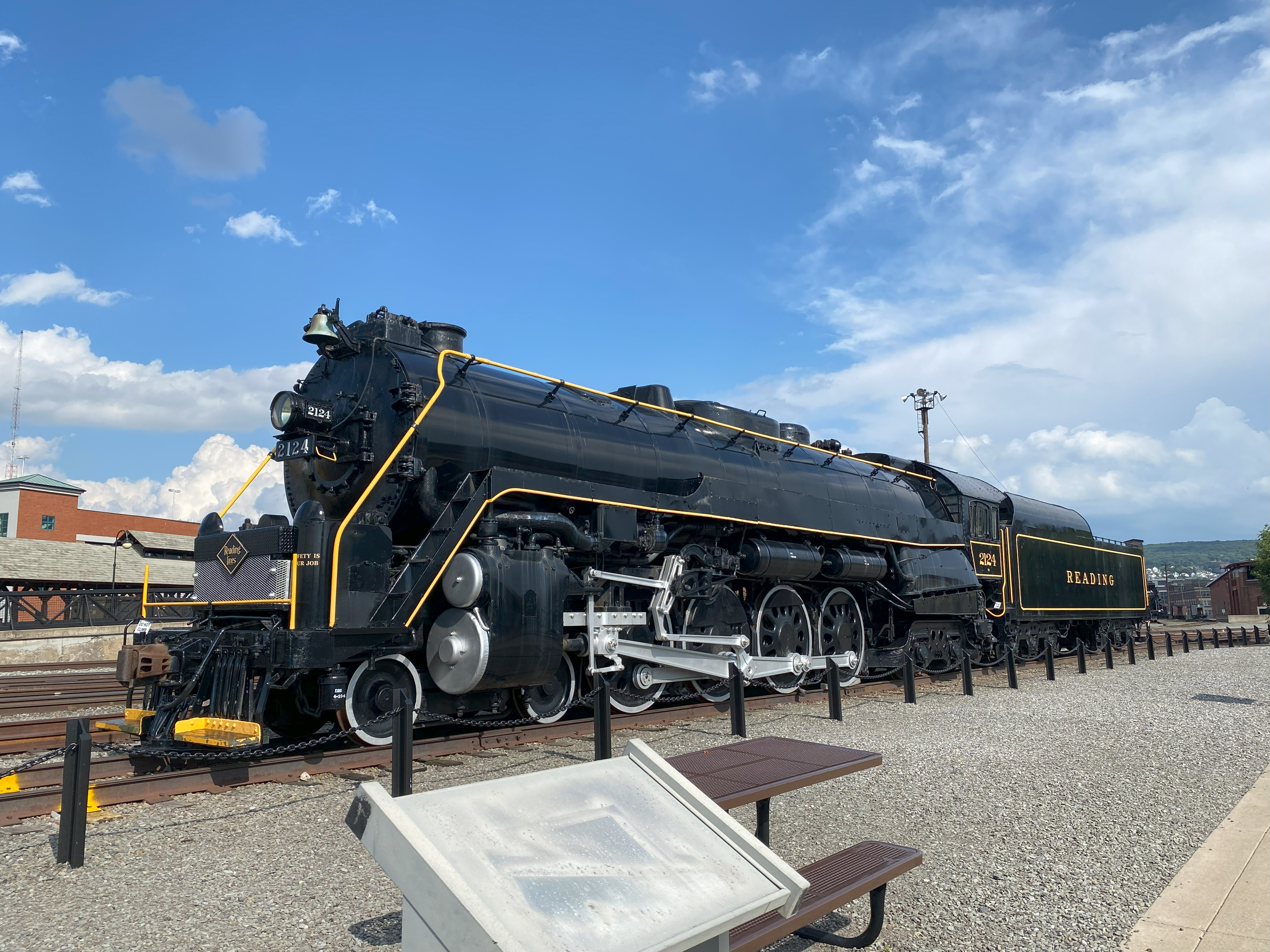
No. 2124 on display at Steamtown in Scranton, Pennsylvania, on August 12, 2023

2124, an all-roller-bearing-equipped locomotive, was purchased by New England seafood magnate and steam locomotive collector F. Nelson Blount in 1962 for static display at his Steamtown, U.S.A. museum in North Walpole, New Hampshire. In 1965, 2124 was moved to Steamtown, U.S.A.'s new location in Bellows Falls, Vermont. In 1984, 2124 along with the majority of the Steamtown collection was moved to Scranton, Pennsylvania. In 1986, ownership of 2124 was transferred to the United States National Park Service along with most of Steamtown, U.S.A.'s assets as part of the new Steamtown National Historic Site. As of 2024, No. 2124 is on static display at Steamtown.

== Accidents and incidents ==
- On December 30, 1947, No. 2122 was sitting idle at the Reading Yard with an eastbound freight train when it was struck head-on by a runaway westbound freight train, being hauled by K-1sa 2-10-2 No. 3002. Although there were no fatalities from the accident, both locomotives were severely damaged. The accident was caused by an inexperienced and unqualified engineer who failed to set the brakes on time while descending Temple Hill, which was a 1.1% grade. Despite both locomotives being repaired, No. 2122 had operating problems for the rest of its career and was the first T-1 to be retired and scrapped in 1954 as a result.
- On June 4, 1948, No. 2105 was involved in a serious derailment at Lebanon Junction. The locomotive was speeding through the junction with a freight train and toppled over onto its fireman's side due to the signalman giving the crew the wrong signal.
- On July 28, 1949, No. 2101 suffered a catastrophic derailment, allegedly while pulling a freight train. The specific location is unknown, and it is unknown if the engineer or fireman were injured or killed.
- In 1968, No. 2102 was pulling an excursion train on the Grand Trunk Western when a minor derailment damaged its Hennessey oil lubricators on the second driving axle, and the lubricator was subsequently converted to a grease block. The locomotive sat idle for the next three years.
- On March 6, 1979, a roundhouse at Stevens Yard in Silver Grove, Kentucky caught fire with No. 2101 inside, and the locomotive was damaged. No. 2101 was subsequently traded to the B&O Railroad Museum in exchange for Chesapeake and Ohio 614, and it was cosmetically restored back to its American Freedom Train livery. 2101 has since been given another cosmetic restoration at the B&O Railroad Museum in Baltimore, Maryland.

== Bibliography ==
- Zimmermann, Karl (Fall 2018). "Rambling on the Reading". Classic Trains. Vol. 19, no. 3. Kalmbach Media. pp. 22–28.
