= Canadian National 6218 =

Preserved CN U-2-g 4-8-4 Locomotive

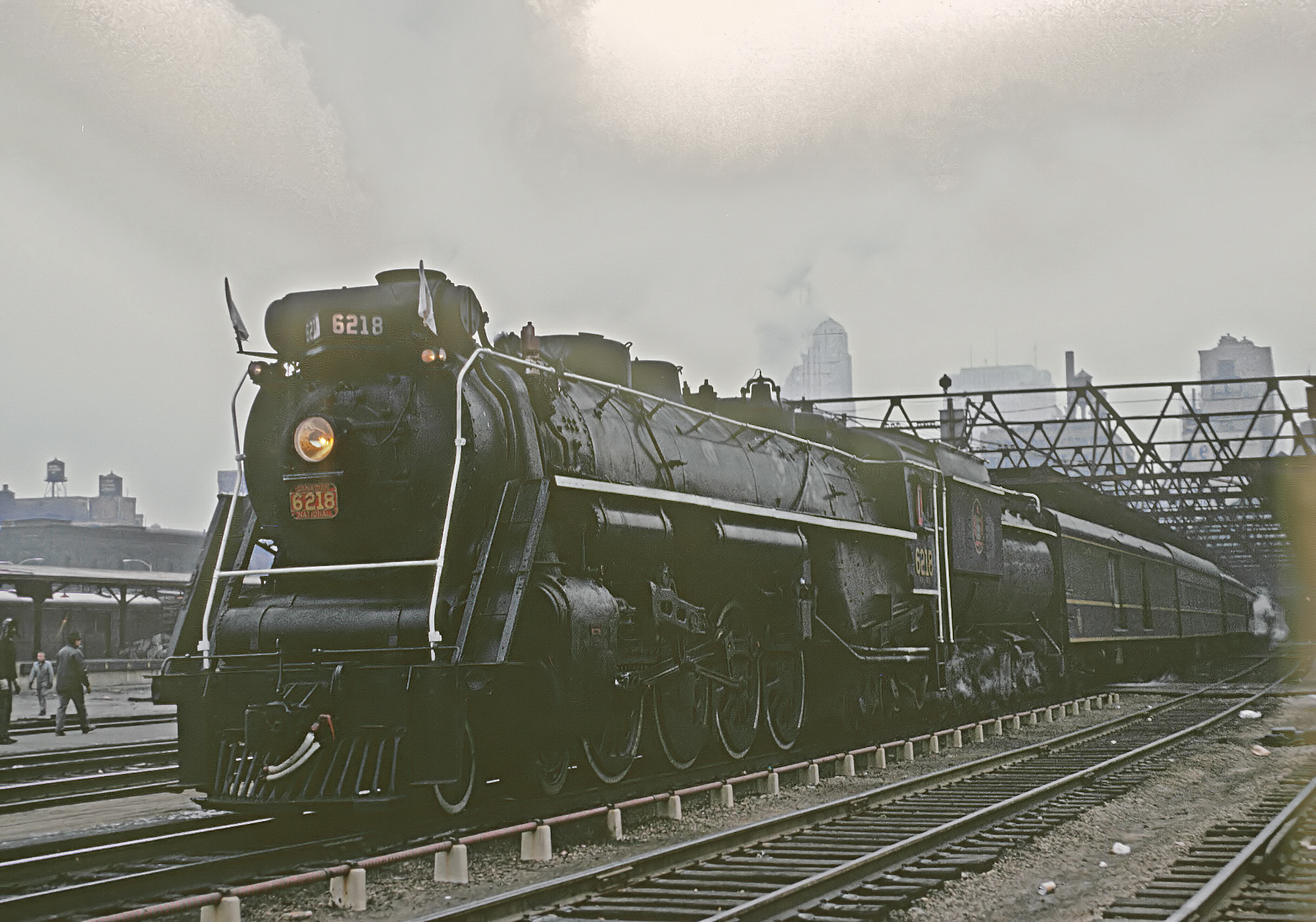
- 6218 with an Illinois Railroad Club Special at Dearborn Station in Chicago, Illinois, US, on November 20, 1966
Type and origin
- Power type: Steam
- Builder: Montreal Locomotive Works
- Serial number: 69716
- Model: U-2-g
- Build date: September 1942
Specifications
- Configuration
  - Whyte: 4-8-4
  - UIC: 2′D2′ h2
- Gauge: 4 ft 8 1/2 in (1,435 mm)
- Driver dia.: 71.28 in (1,811 mm)
- Wheelbase: 82.40 ft (25.12 m)
  - Engine: 43.83 ft (13.36 m)
  - Drivers: 19.50 ft (5.94 m)
- Adhesive weight: 246,100 lb (111,600 kg)
- Loco weight: 400,300 lb (181,600 kg)
- Tender weight: 278,000 lb (126,000 kg)
- Total weight: 678,300 lb (307,700 kg)
- Fuel type: Coal
- Fuel capacity: 36,000 lb (16.3 metric tons)
- Water cap.: 13,920 US gal (52,700 L; 11,590 imp gal)
- Boiler pressure: 250 psi (1,700 kPa)
- Heating surface
  - Firebox: 414 sq ft (38.5 m^{2})
- Superheater
  - Heating area: 1,835 sq ft (170.5 m^{2})
- Cylinders: Two, outside
- Cylinder size: 25.5 in × 30 in (650 mm × 760 mm)
- Valve gear: Walschaerts
- Valve type: Piston valves
- Loco brake: Air
- Train brakes: Air
- Couplers: Knuckle
Performance figures
- Power output: 3,027 PS (2,230 kW; 2,990 hp)
- Tractive effort: 56,786 lbf (252.60 kN)
- Factor of adh.: 4.33
Career
- Operators: Canadian National Railway
- Class: U-2-g
- Number in class: 19th of 65
- Numbers: CN 6218
- Last run: 1971
- Retired: April 1960 (revenue service); 1971 (excursion service)
- Restored: 1964
- Current owner: Fort Erie Railway Museum
- Disposition: On static display

Canadian National 6218 is a U-2-g class 4-8-4 "Northern" type steam locomotive, built by the Montreal Locomotive Works (MLW) in 1942 for the Canadian National Railway (CN). It became famous after CN brought it back for their steam excursion program from 1964 to 1971. It is now on static display at the Fort Erie Railway Museum in Fort Erie, Ontario.

== History ==
=== Revenue service ===
Built by the Montreal Locomotive Works (MLW) in September 1942, No. 6218 was designed for pulling mainline passenger trains between Winnipeg, Manitoba, and Halifax, Nova Scotia, for the Canadian National Railway (CN). The locomotive was one of 65 U-2-g/h “Confederation” locomotives that were built in the early-mid 1940s during the Second World War. 6218 was eventually reassigned to pull freight and mail trains after diesel locomotives took over the high-priority passenger trains. After a mostly uneventful career with CN, 6218 was retired in 1960 after CN made a complete transition to diesel power.

=== Excursion service ===
After being retired, 6218 was put into storage inside a roundhouse. In 1964, No. 6218 was selected by CN to be used on their steam excursion program as a replacement for their previous locomotive, U-2-e class 4-8-4 6167. The 6218 was overhauled in the Stratford, Ontario, shops in November 1963, before the shops subsequently closed for good. The 6218 was brought back under steam in 1964, and in September of that year, it performed a double header with 6167 shortly before that engine’s retirement. For the rest of the 1964 operational season, 6218 pulled fall-foliage trains sponsored by the Canadian Railroad Historical Association (CRHA). The engine spent the next seven years famously pulling several excursion runs between Montreal, Ontario, and many other cities. During the rest of the engine’s new lease on life, the 6218 had its smoke deflectors removed and reinstalled frequently.

The locomotive became even more famous in November 1968, when it pulled a few excursions on the Grand Trunk Western between Chicago, Illinois, and South Bend, Indiana, sponsored by the Illinois Railroad Club. As the constant boiler extensions for the 6218 continued to become shorter, though, CN decided to operate the final excursion trips to usher out what appeared to be the end of their steam fantrip program. In 1970, the 6218 pulled a series of fan trips that were dubbed “Countdown 6218”, as orchestrated by the Montreal-based St Lawrence Region Department of Public Relations. On July 3 and 4, 1971, the 6218 performed its final runs between Belleville and Anson Junction. After the final runs ended, No. 6218 was retired by CN, and it became replaced on the fantrip program by U-1-f 4-8-2 No. 6060.

=== Disposition ===
After its retirement from excursion service, 6218 was put into storage. In 1972, the locomotive was donated to the Fort Erie Railway Museum in Fort Erie, Ontario, along with a caboose. A second restoration was considered in 2010, but the cost was estimated to be around $429,000. Another restoration possibility was considered in 2017, as it was within several options that were explored to change the locomotive’s future. However, the Fort Erie city council chose to keep the locomotive at the museum, and a cosmetic restoration was performed instead. The locomotive remains on static display at the museum as of 2025.

== See also ==
- Canadian National 6213
- Confederation locomotive
- Grand Trunk Western 6325
- Grand Trunk Western 6323
- Canadian National 6060
- Canadian National 6077
- Union Pacific 844
- Chicago, Burlington and Quincy 5632
- Norfolk and Western 611
