= Confederation locomotive =

Class of Canadian 4-8-4 Northern Type locomotives

Canadian National Confederation Locomotives
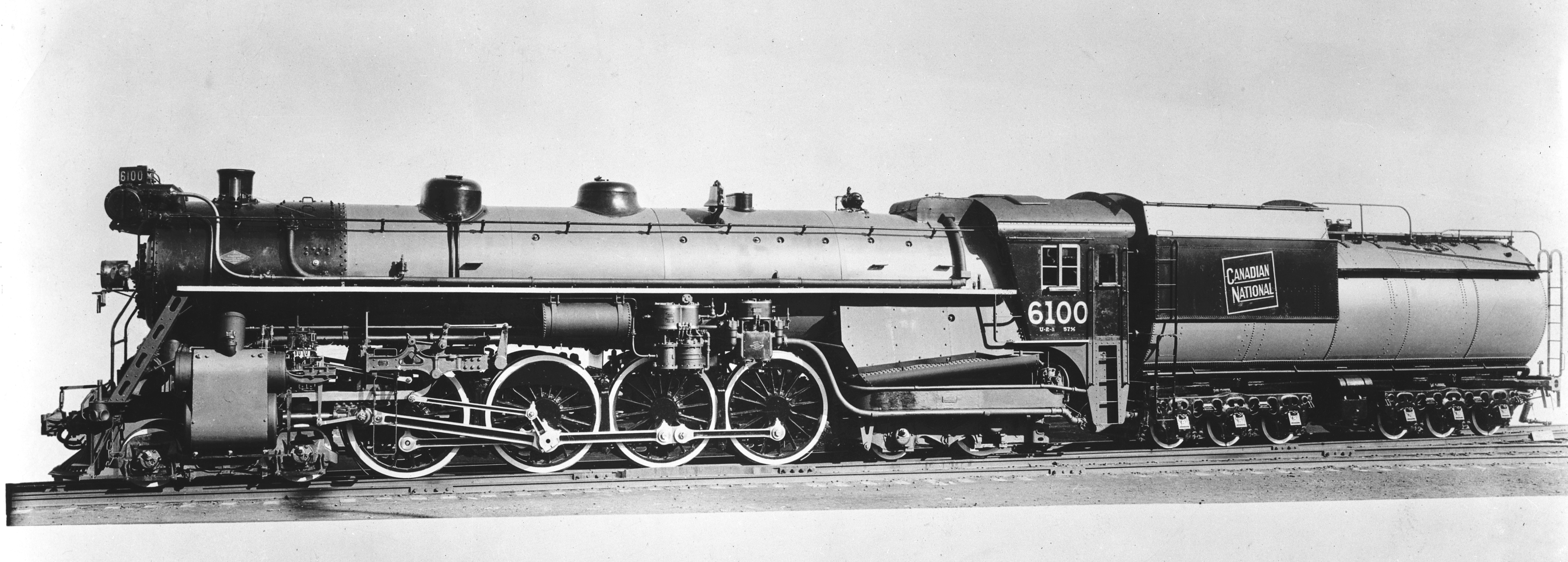
- Class U-2-a No. 6100, the first of the class, when first built in June 2, 1927.
Type and origin
- Build date: 1927–1944
- Total produced: U-2: 155; U-3: 37; U-4: 11
Specifications
- Configuration
  - Whyte: 4-8-4
- Gauge: 4 ft 8 1/2 in (1,435 mm)
- Length: 95 ft 1 in (28.98 m)
- Loco weight: 379,800 lb (172.3 t)
- Fuel type: Coal
- Fuel capacity: 40,000 lb (18 t)
Career
- Operators: Canadian National Railway, Grand Trunk Western Railroad
- Retired: 1953–1959

Canadian National U-4-a class and U-4-b sub class
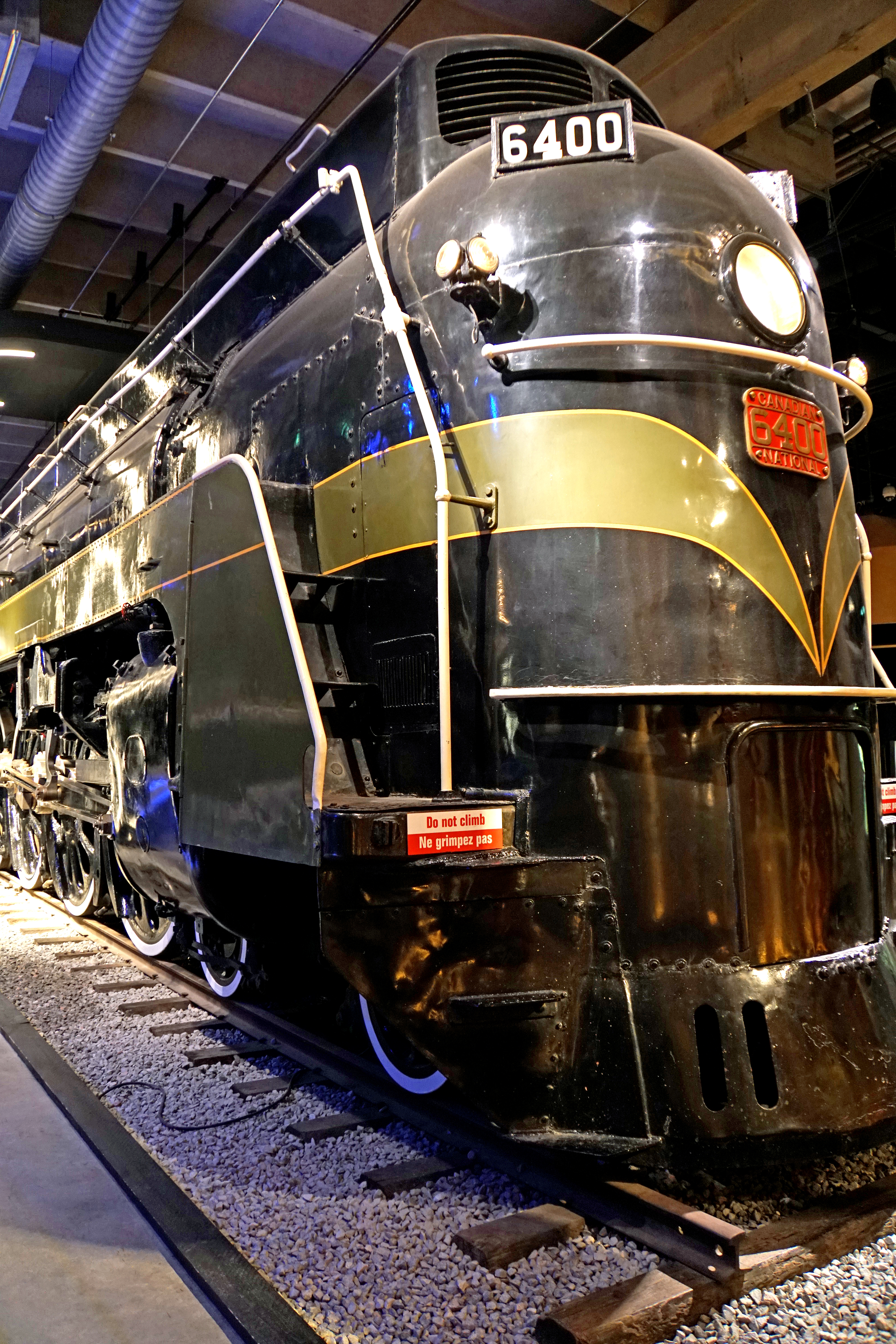
- Canadian National 6400 on static display inside the Canada Science and Technology Museum
Type and origin
- Power type: steam
- Builder: Montreal Locomotive Works
- Model: U-4-a Class and U-4-b Class “6400 Series”
- Build date: 1936–1938
- Total produced: 11
Specifications
- Configuration
  - Whyte: 4-8-4
- Gauge: 1,435 mm (4 ft 8 1/2 in)
Career
- Operators: Canadian National Railway, Grand Trunk Western Railroad
- Disposition: 1 preserved, remaider scrapped.

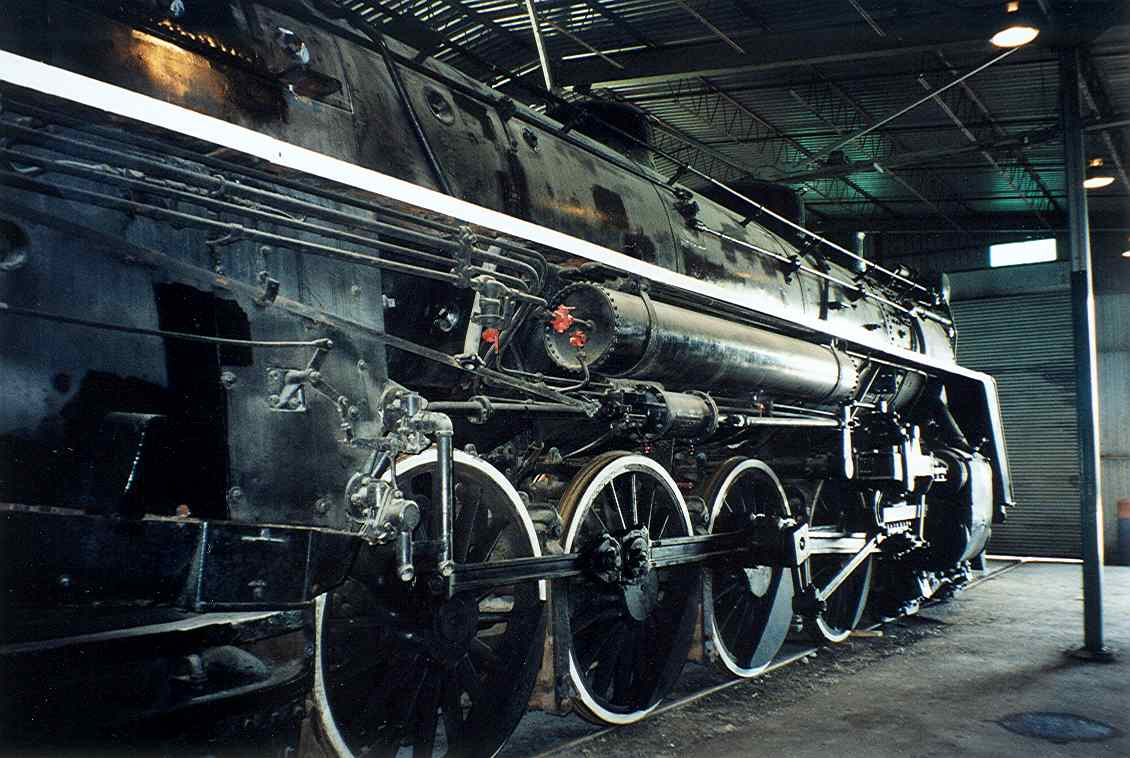
CN 6153 Class U-2-c on display at the Canadian Railway Museum in Delson/Saint-Constant, Quebec

The Canadian National Confederation Locomotive type or the Canadian National U Classes is a type of Canadian steam locomotive with a 4-8-4 wheel arrangement used on Canadian railways. Most were built by the Montreal Locomotive Works (MLW) in Montreal, Quebec, and the Canadian Locomotive Company (CLC) in Kingston, Ontario, for the Canadian National Railway (CNR) including Lima Locomotive Works in Lima, Ohio . The "Confederation" type was later given the more common designation "Northern" type. They were the backbone of the CNR locomotive fleet from the 1930s to the 1950s. Eight locomotives of this type have been preserved from the CNR and two from the CPR. They were built from 1927 until 1943 and 1944 (when Canada began supplying the UK with metal during World War II) .

CN 6400 used roller-bearing boxes on all running and tender axles, with bearings made by SKF of Sweden. CN ordered 155 U-2 classes from 1927 to 1944. CN also ordered 5 U-4a locomotives in 1936, and the GTW ordered 36 U-3 classes from 1927 to 1943. The GTW ordered 5 U-4b locomotives in 1938. In total, 203 were built for CN and the GTW. All 203 locomotives remained in service until they were retired between 1953 and 1959. A few have survived into preservation, CN 6153, CN 6167, CN 6200, CN 6213, CN 6218 and CN 6400, and two from the GTW survived as well, GTW 6323 and GTW 6325.

== List of subclasses ==
- U-2-a: Built 1927, numbered 6100–6119
- U-2-b: Built 1927, numbered 6120–6139
- U-2-c: Built 1929, numbered 6140–6159
- U-2-d: Built 1936, numbered 6160–6164
- U-2-e: Built 1940, numbered 6165–6179
- U-2-f: Built 1940, numbered 6180–6189
- U-2-g: Built 1943, numbered 6200–6234
- U-2-h: Built 1944, numbered 6235–6264
- U-3-a: Built 1927, numbered 6300–6311
- U-3-b: Built 1943–1944, numbered 6312–6336
- U-4-a: Built 1936, numbered: 6400–6404
- U-4-b: Built 1938, numbered: 6405–6410

== Preservation ==
- CN 6153: On display at the Canadian Railway Museum.
- CN 6167: On display at downtown Guelph.
- CN 6200: On display at the Canada Science and Technology Museum in Ottawa.
- CN 6213: On display at downtown Toronto at the Toronto Railway Museum.
- CN 6218: On display at Fort Erie Railroad Museum at Fort Erie, Ontario.
- CN 6400: On display at the Canada Science and Technology Museum in Ottawa.
- GTW 6323: On display at the Illinois Railway Museum in Union, Illinois.
- GTW 6325: Owned by the Age of Steam Roundhouse in Sugarcreek, Ohio.

== In fiction ==
The character Vinnie (voiced by John Schwab) from the popular series Thomas and Friends is based on a Canadian National U-4-a, using the number of a GTW U-4-b.

== Gallery ==
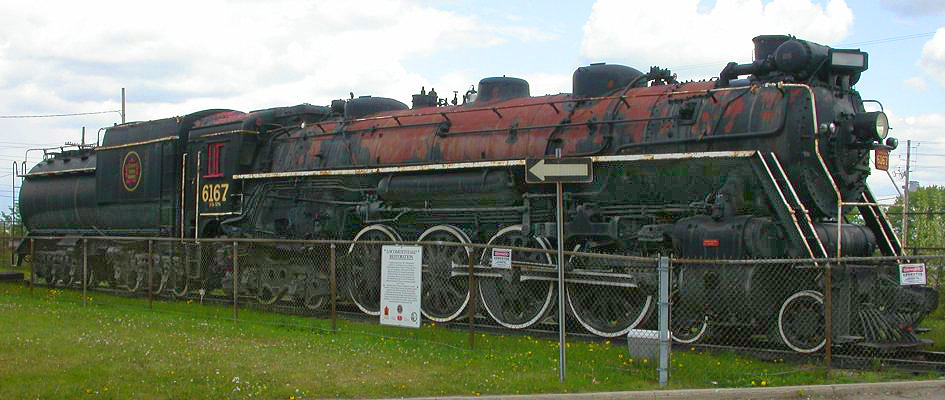
CN 6167 Class U-2-e on display at Guelph, Ontario

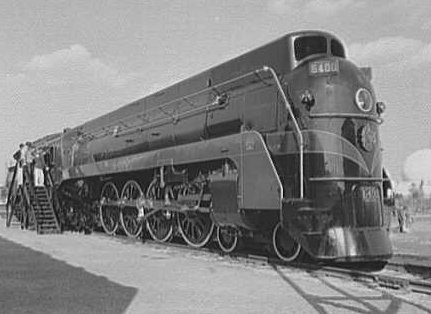
CN 6400 Class U-4-a at the 1939 New York World's Fair "Railroads on Parade" exhibit

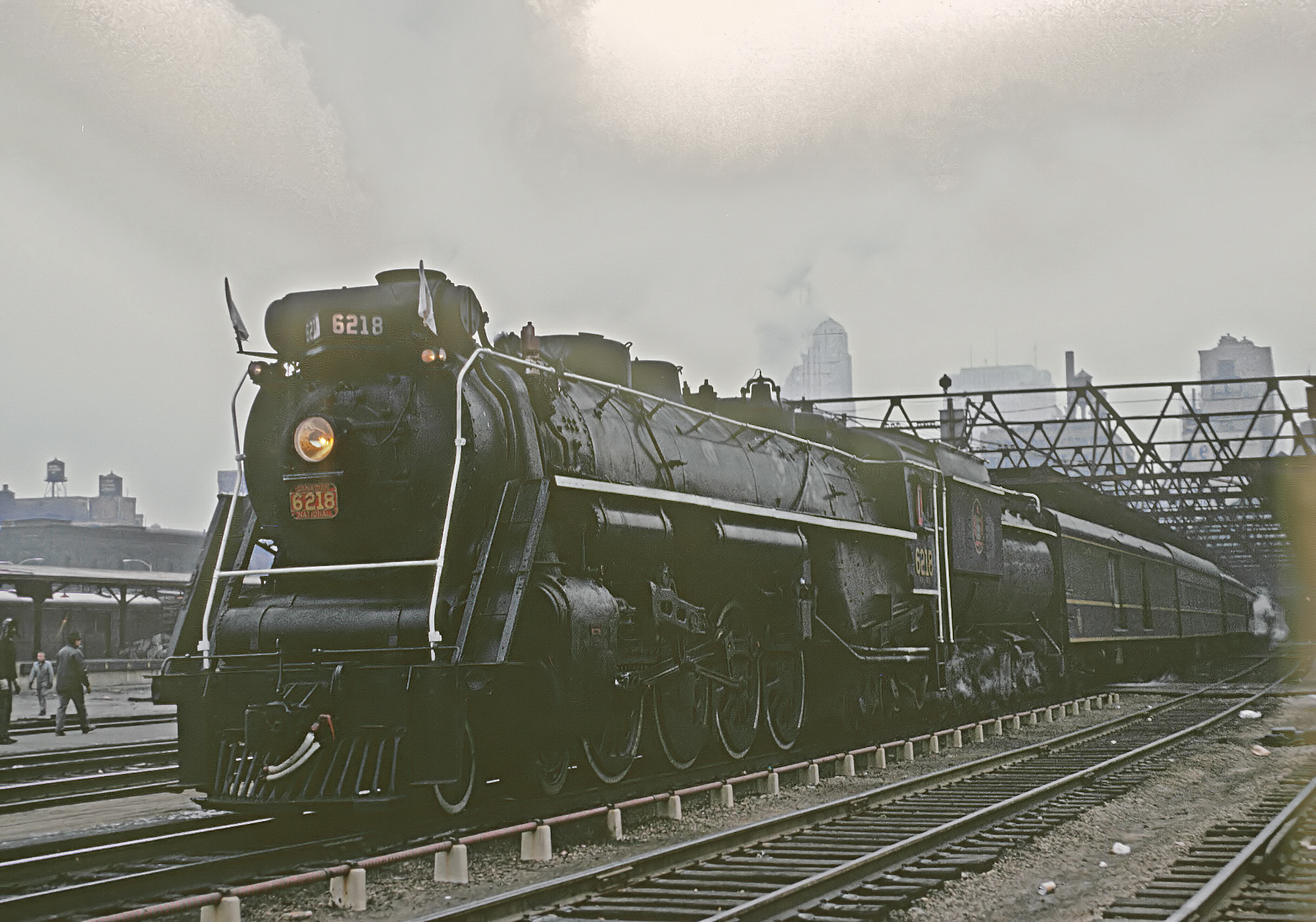
CN 6218 pulling an excursion train out of Chicago, Illinois, in 1966

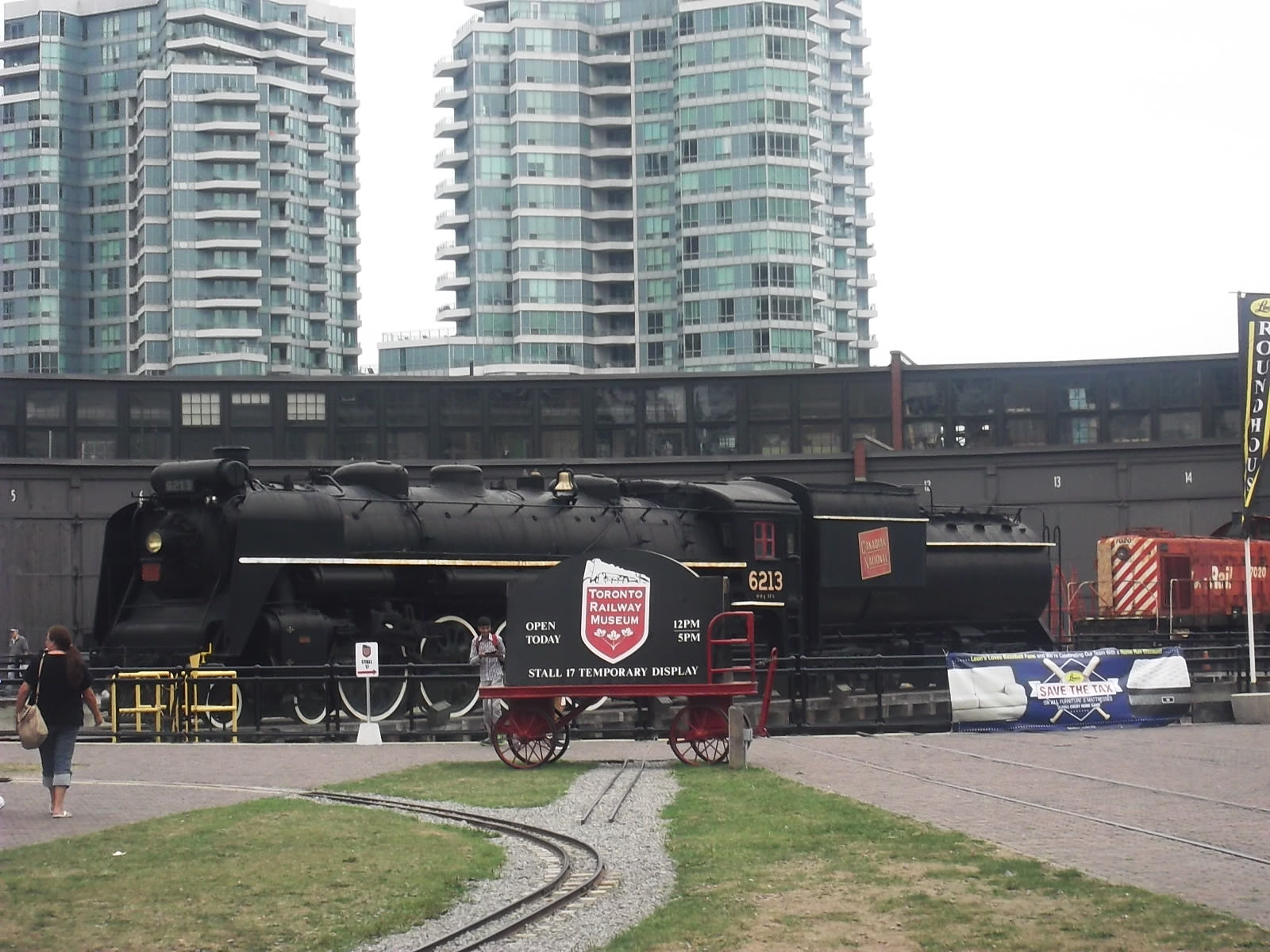
CN 6213 Class U-2-g on display at Roundhouse Park in Toronto, Ontario
