= Grand Trunk Western 6323 =

Preserved GTW U-3-b class 4-8-4 locomotive

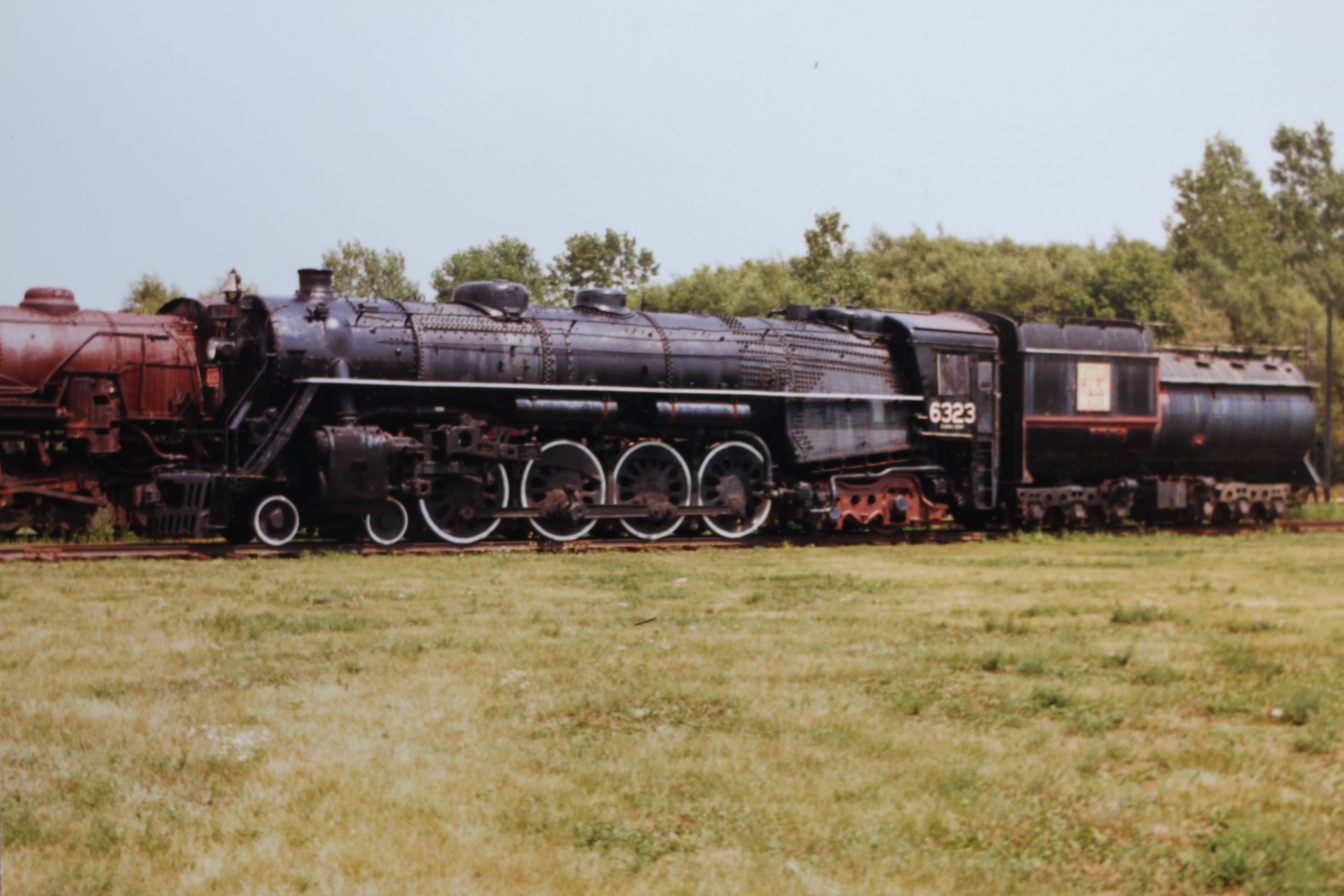
- No. 6323 on static display at the Illinois Railway Museum in 1988
Type and origin
- Power type: Steam
- Builder: American Locomotive Company
- Order number: S-1845
- Serial number: 69629
- Build date: February 1942
Specifications
- Configuration
  - Whyte: 4-8-4
- Gauge: 4 ft 8 1/2 in (1,435 mm)
- Leading dia.: 33 in (838 mm)
- Driver dia.: 73 in (1,854 mm)
- Trailing dia.: 34 1/4 in (870 mm) and 48 in (1,219 mm)
- Minimum curve: 16°
- Length: 95 ft 1 1/4 in (28.99 m)
- Width: 10 ft 11 in (3.33 m)
- Height: 15 ft 7 in (4.75 m)
- Adhesive weight: 245,000 lb (111.1 metric tons)
- Loco weight: 403,000 lb (182.8 metric tons)
- Tender weight: 270,500 lb (122.7 metric tons)
- Fuel type: Coal
- Fuel capacity: 32,000 lb (14.5 metric tons)
- Water cap.: 14,300 US gal (54,000 L; 11,900 imp gal)
- Firebox
  - Grate area: 84.3 sq ft (7.83 m^{2})
- Boiler pressure: 250 psi (1,700 kPa)
- Heating surface
  - Firebox: 413 sq ft (38.4 m^{2})
  - Tubes: 3,989 sq ft (370.6 m^{2})
- Superheater
  - Type: Schmidt type E
  - Heating area: 1,955 sq ft (181.6 m^{2})
- Cylinders: Two, outside
- Cylinder size: 26 in × 30 in (660 mm × 762 mm)
- Valve gear: Walschaerts
- Valve type: 14-inch (356 mm) piston valves
- Valve travel: 7 1/2 in (191 mm)
- Train heating: Steam
Performance figures
- Tractive effort: 59,034 lbf (262.60 kN)
- Factor of adh.: 4.15
Career
- Operators: Grand Trunk Western Railroad
- Class: U-3-b
- Numbers: GTW 6323
- First run: February 1942
- Last run: September 20, 1961
- Retired: August 5, 1961
- Preserved: 1973
- Restored: August 1981 (cosmetically)
- Current owner: Illinois Railway Museum
- Disposition: On static display

Grand Trunk Western No. 6323 is a preserved class "U-3-b" 4-8-4 "Northern" type steam locomotive built by Alco in 1942. It served the Grand Trunk Western Railroad by pulling various heavy freight and passenger trains across the Lower Peninsula of Michigan and Northern Indiana. It became famous in later years for being the very last active steam locomotive to run on the GTW's trackage while still on the railroad's active list in 1961. After sitting in storage for several years in Detroit, No. 6323 was sold in 1981 to the Illinois Railway Museum, and since then, it has remained on static display in Union, Illinois.

== History ==
=== Revenue service ===
No. 6323 was constructed in February 1942 by the American Locomotive Company in Schenectady, New York as the twelfth member of the Grand Trunk Western's U-3-b class. The U-3-bs were a class of 4-8-4 "Northerns"(or "Confederation" types as sometimes referred to by the GTW) that were primarily used for fast freight and passenger trains. No. 6323, in particular, was mainly assigned to pull the Maple Leaf passenger train between Chicago, Illinois and Toronto, Ontario in Canada alongside the GTW's streamlined U-4-b locomotives. It was also often seen pulling mixed freight trains across the Lower Peninsula of Michigan and Northern Indiana. The U-3-bs were also well liked by crews for being such reliable steam locomotives and for having enough power to pull up to sixteen passenger cars or eighty freight cars with equal ease on flat lands, and No. 6323 was no exception.

Throughout the late 1950s, the GTW was in the process of retiring their steam locomotives and replacing them with diesel locomotives, and by 1961, No. 6323 was the last steam locomotive on the GTW's active list. During the locomotive's final two years of service on the railroad, the Michigan Railroad Club sponsored several excursion trains that ran across the GTW's trackage, with No. 6323 being the main motive power. The first excursion train took place on December 1, 1960, between Detroit, Michigan and South Bend, Indiana. Throughout 1961, the GTW used No. 6323 to pull several excursion trains between Detroit and South Bend, as well as trains that led to Port Huron, Michigan, Valparaiso, Indiana, and Chicago. The last excursion train took place on September 20, 1961, which marked the very last regularly scheduled train the GTW ever hosted by themselves. That was also the last time No. 6323 ever moved under its own power and would be officially retired from service.

=== Preservation ===
After being retired, No. 6323 was sold in November 1961 to Fred Crew, who stored the locomotive in Downtown Detroit. After Fred died in October 1971, No. 6323 was sold again in 1973 to Robert Johnson, who was a member of the Illinois Railway Museum (IRM), and he had No. 6323 partially disassembled while being stored. In August 1981, No. 6323 was moved to the IRM's grounds in Union, Illinois, and the locomotive received a cosmetic repaint soon afterwards. No. 6323 subsequently spent over two decades on static display outdoors while receiving some cosmetic touch-ups as time flew by. While on display, No. 6323 was often coupled to a maintenance of way tender, No. 6323B, which came off of a fellow GTW U-3-b that had been scrapped years prior. In the early 2000s, No. 6323 was moved inside one of the IRM's locomotive houses to be protected out of the weather, since its paint was beginning to chip off, and the rust on its tender was beginning to be exposed. As of 2025, No. 6323 still on indoor display at the IRM, and it is also awaiting a future cosmetic restoration to become more presentable to the general public once again.

== Historical significance ==
No. 6323 holds significance for being the very last operational steam locomotive on the Grand Trunk Western's active roster. It is also one of only two GTW 4-8-4's left to be preserved and one of seventeen GTW steam locomotives left in general.

== Notable sister engines ==
- No. 6323 has only one surviving sister engine, No. 6325, who was famous for pulling President Harry S. Truman's campaign train across Michigan in 1948, as well as being used by the Ohio Central Railroad for excursion service from 2001 to 2004. It now resides at the Age of Steam Roundhouse in Sugarcreek, Ohio on static display.
- No. 6322 was another well known sister engine, that is, for being the very last steam locomotive to be used by the GTW to pull a regularly scheduled passenger train. The train ran between Detroit to Durand during November 1960. The locomotive was retired by 1961, and was subsequently sold for scrap.
- No. 6327 was, yet, another well known sister engine, No. 6327 is known for being the last steam engine to run in Port Huron, Michigan, as well as pulling the last steam train there. No. 6327 was among the last of GTW's steam engines still operating when the railroad dieselized in 1960 and it was scrapped that year.

== See also ==
- Grand Trunk Western 6039
- Grand Trunk Western 4070
- Canadian National 6213
- St. Louis-San Francisco 1630
- Southern Pacific 975
