= Grand Trunk Western 6039 =

Preserved GTW U-1-c class 4-8-2 locomotive

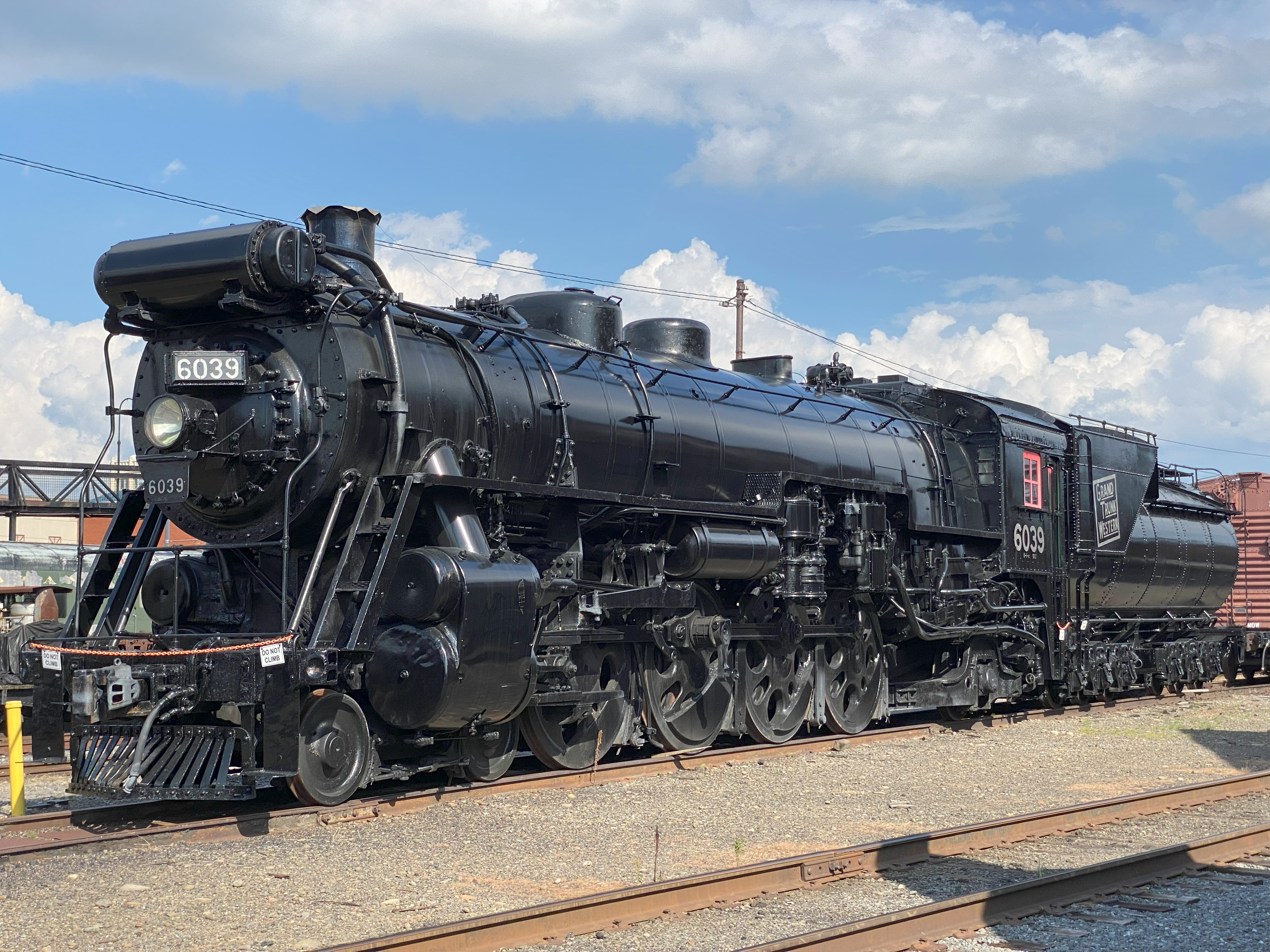
- No. 6039 on static display at Steamtown National Historic Site in Scranton, Pennsylvania, August 2023
Type and origin
- Power type: Steam
- Builder: Baldwin Locomotive Works
- Serial number: 58463
- Build date: June 26, 1925
Specifications
- Configuration
  - Whyte: 4-8-2
  - UIC: 2'D1
- Gauge: 4 ft 8 1/2 in (1,435 mm)
- Driver dia.: 73 in (1,900 mm)
- Wheelbase: 80.31 ft (24.48 m)
  - Engine: 41.75 ft (12.73 m)
  - Drivers: 19.50 ft (5.94 m)
- Adhesive weight: 231,370 lb (104,950 kg)
- Loco weight: 354,110 lb (160,620 kg)
- Tender weight: 250,000 lb (110,000 kg)
- Total weight: 604,110 lb (274,020 kg)
- Tender type: Vanderbilt
- Fuel type: Coal
- Fuel capacity: 18 t (18 long tons; 20 short tons)
- Water cap.: 13,575 US gal (51,390 L; 11,304 imp gal)
- Firebox
  - Grate area: 66.70 sq ft (6.197 m^{2})
- Boiler pressure: 210 psi (1,400 kPa)
- Feedwater heater: Elesco
- Heating surface
  - Firebox: 307 sq ft (28.5 m^{2})
- Cylinders: Two, outside
- Cylinder size: 26 in × 30 in (660 mm × 760 mm)
- Valve gear: Walschaerts
- Valve type: Piston valves
- Loco brake: Air
- Train brakes: Air
- Couplers: Knuckle
Performance figures
- Tractive effort: 49,589 lb (22,493 kg)
- Factor of adh.: 4.67
Career
- Operators: Grand Trunk Western Railroad; Central Vermont Railroad
- Class: U-1-c
- Number in class: 3 of 5
- Numbers: GTW 6039; CV 6039
- Retired: 1959
- Preserved: June 17, 1959
- Restored: 2012 (cosmetically)
- Current owner: Steamtown National Historic Site
- Disposition: On static display, while being occasionally moved around

Grand Trunk Western No. 6039 is a preserved class "U-1-c" 4-8-2 "Mountain" type steam locomotive, built in June 1925 by the Baldwin Locomotive Works (BLW). It served the Grand Trunk Western Railroad (GTW) by pulling fast passenger and freight trains throughout the Lower Peninsula of Michigan, until the railroad decided to dieselize their locomotive fleet. During that time, it was leased to the Central Vermont Railway for freight service, only to become one of the very last steam locomotives to regularly operate in the state of Vermont. After being retired in the late 1950s, No. 6039 became one of the first steam locomotives to be owned by F. Nelson Blount, and it subsequently became part of his Steamtown, U.S.A. collection for static display. In 1984, the locomotive was moved along with every other locomotive in the Steamtown collection from Bellows Falls to Scranton, Pennsylvania, where the name would late be changed to Steamtown National Historic Site (NHS) under the jurisdiction of the National Park Service. As of 2026, No. 6039 remains on static display at Scranton with very meticulous cosmetic care.

== History ==
=== Revenue service ===
During the 1920s, the 4-8-2 "Mountain" type became increasingly famous with various class 1 railroads in North America for proving their worth in pulling fast passenger trains and heavy freight trains. The Canadian National Railway (CN) purchased sixteen locomotives with this wheel arrangement in 1923, and they proved to be so successful, that the railroad purchased twenty-one additional units the following year. Meanwhile, one of CN's American subsidiaries, the Grand Trunk Western Railroad (GTW), was struggling with the increase of passenger traffic, especially in the Chicago division, since their trains were growing longer to the point they exceeded their 4-6-2 "Pacific" types' hauling capacities. Since double-headers would be a more costly practice, a larger locomotive was needed for the railroad's roster. Between 1923 and 1930, the GTW purchased a total of fifty-nine 4-8-2 locomotives for their roster, and they were classified as U-1-as, U-1-bs, U-1-cs, U-1-ds, and U-1-es, designed by the GTW's Chief Mechanical Engineer of the time Thomas H. Walker. For the U-1-c class, the GTW approached the Baldwin Locomotive Works of Philadelphia, Pennsylvania to place an order of five locomotives in 1925, and they were numbered 6037–6041.

These locomotives also featured Elesco feedwater heaters, power reverse gear, and mechanical stokers, and they were the first on the GTW to feature both Vanderbilt tenders and enclosed, all-weather cabs. No. 6039 was the third member of the class, and it was initially used by the GTW to pull heavy passenger trains between Chicago, Illinois and Port Huron, Michigan. Due to how successful it did while pulling passengers and how well liked it was by train crews, No. 6039 was often seen on fast freight trains beginning in the early 1930s. As time progressed, the GTW had given No. 6039 and the other U-1-cs a number of modifications; during the mid-1930s the U-1-cs were all equipped with roller bearings on leading and trailing trucks on the locomotive itself rather than the friction bearings they were initially built with. During the 1940s, No. 6039 was reported to have received vanadium steel main frames and boxpok driving wheels, but not all of them were applied at the same. A photographer reportedly caught No. 6039 at Elsdon terminal in March 1939 with boxpok wheels only on the second driving axle, while on September 21, 1941, it was reportedly caught having the boxpok wheels on the first, second, and third axles, but not on the fourth axle. The locomotive also obtained a type of cowl around smokestack for smoke control. However, this was later removed for proving to be ineffective.

As good as these locomotives were, however, the GTW had acquired larger locomotives to help pull the longer trains, such as the "Confederation" class 4-8-4s. After World War II, the GTW started investing into diesel locomotives, which would take over most of the high-priority assignments. As a result of this, No. 6039 was reassigned to pulling secondary passenger trains between Detroit and Muskegon, and it last served in the late 1950s. At that time, the locomotive was leased to the Central Vermont Railway (CV), another American subsidiary of CN, to pull fast freight trains throughout the state of Vermont. No. 6039 pulled its last train in early 1959, right before its fire was dropped for the last time.

=== Preservation ===
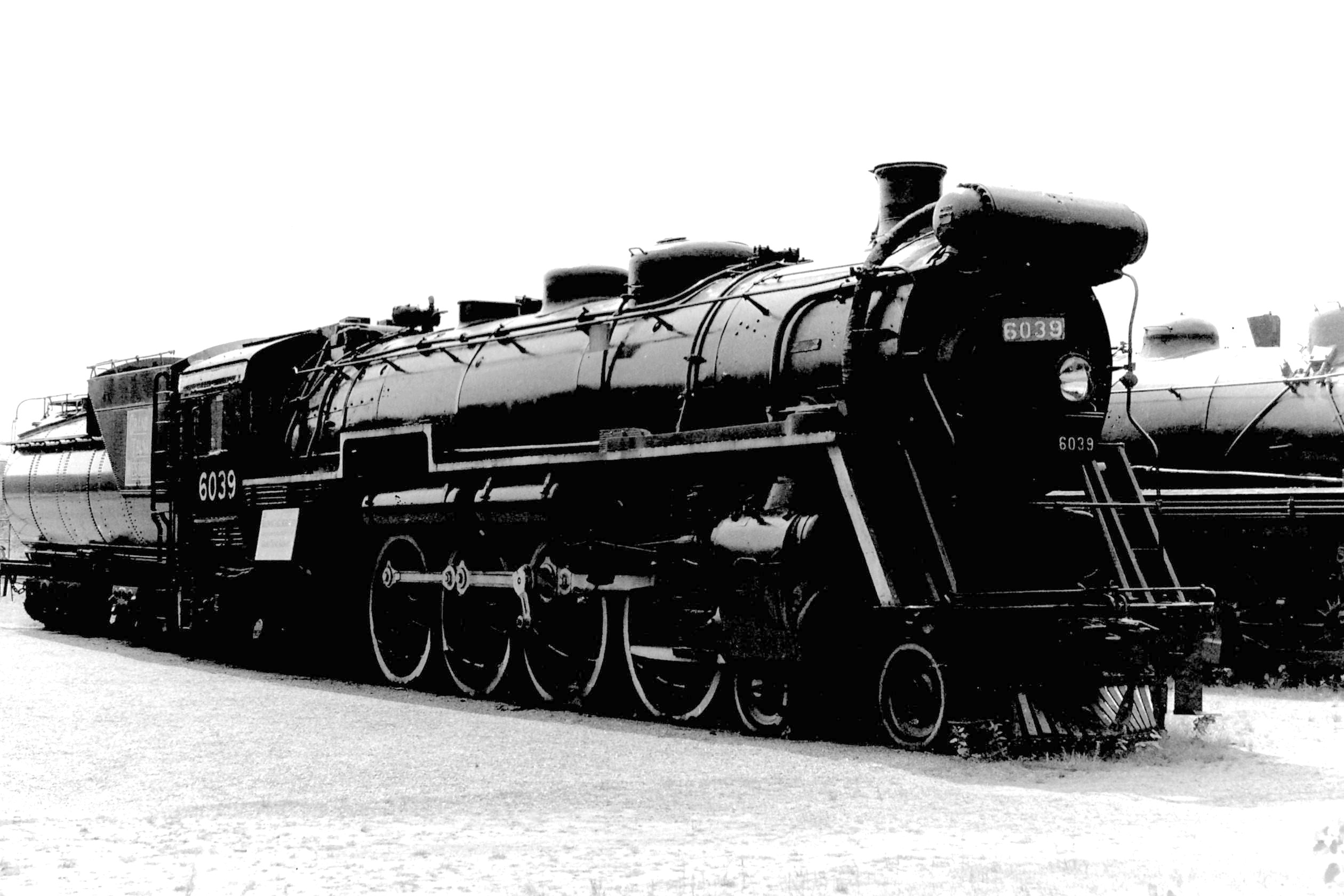
No. 6039 on static display at Bellows Falls, Vermont in the early 1970s

After sitting in storage for a few months, No. 6039 was sold for $7,425 (equal to $82,006 today) on June 17, 1959, to seafood magnate and steam locomotive enthusiast F. Nelson Blount. Blount wanted the locomotive to be shipped to Wakefield, Massachusetts to be exhibited at the Pleasure Island amusement park, but it ended up being put in storage in St. Albans, instead.

In 1960, No. 6039 was moved to Riverside, to become an exhibit of Blount's new Steamtown, U.S.A. collection. The following year, it was moved again to North Walpole, New Hampshire, due to the increase in size of the collection of locomotives and rolling stock. The locomotive was also repainted with a light grey smokebox and a solid black number plate, and it was put on display at North Walpole in front of Maine Central 2-8-0 No. 519 and behind Boston and Maine 4-6-2 No. 3713.

In 1965, the collection was moved again across the Connecticut River to Bellows Falls, and No. 6039 found itself on display on Vermont soil again. There, it was repainted again with the smokebox becoming black again. In 1984, No. 6039 was moved along with the rest of the Steamtown collection to Scranton, Pennsylvania, but the locomotive's cylinder castings became damaged during the move. The locomotive was then stored in the Ex-Delaware, Lackawanna and Western yard with other locomotives of the collection, until 1998, when it was given another repaint to become more presentable to the public. It was subsequently put on display next to the new Steamtown National Historic Site's parking lot behind Reading 4-8-4 No. 2124.

In June 2010, No. 6039 was removed from display and towed to Steamtown's back shops to await for another cosmetic restoration that wouldn't come until October the following year. The piping and jacketing were removed so that the underlying asbestos could be safely disposed of. After the new shiny black sheet of boiler jacketing was replaced, Steamtown's boilermaker, Mark St Aubin, took two and a half days to reassemble the piping. The locomotive was subsequently moved out of the back shops to remain on display on various parts of Steamtown property. As of 2023, No. 6039 gets meticulously taken care of while occasionally being moved around for public display with occasional night photo sessions taking place around it.

== Historical significance ==
No. 6039 is the sole survivor of the GTW's 4-8-2 locomotives, and it is one of only seventeen steam locomotives from the GTW that are preserved. It was also one of the last steam locomotives to ever regularly operate in the state of Vermont. No. 6039 was also one of the first steam locomotives to be a part of the Steamtown collection, and the only locomotive in the collection with a 4-8-2 wheel arrangement.

== See also ==
- Grand Trunk Western 6325
- Grand Trunk Western 4070
- Canadian National 6060
- Canadian National 3254
- Boston and Maine 3713
- Reading 2124
- Nickel Plate Road 759
