= Canadian National 6400 =

Canadian streamlined steam locomotive

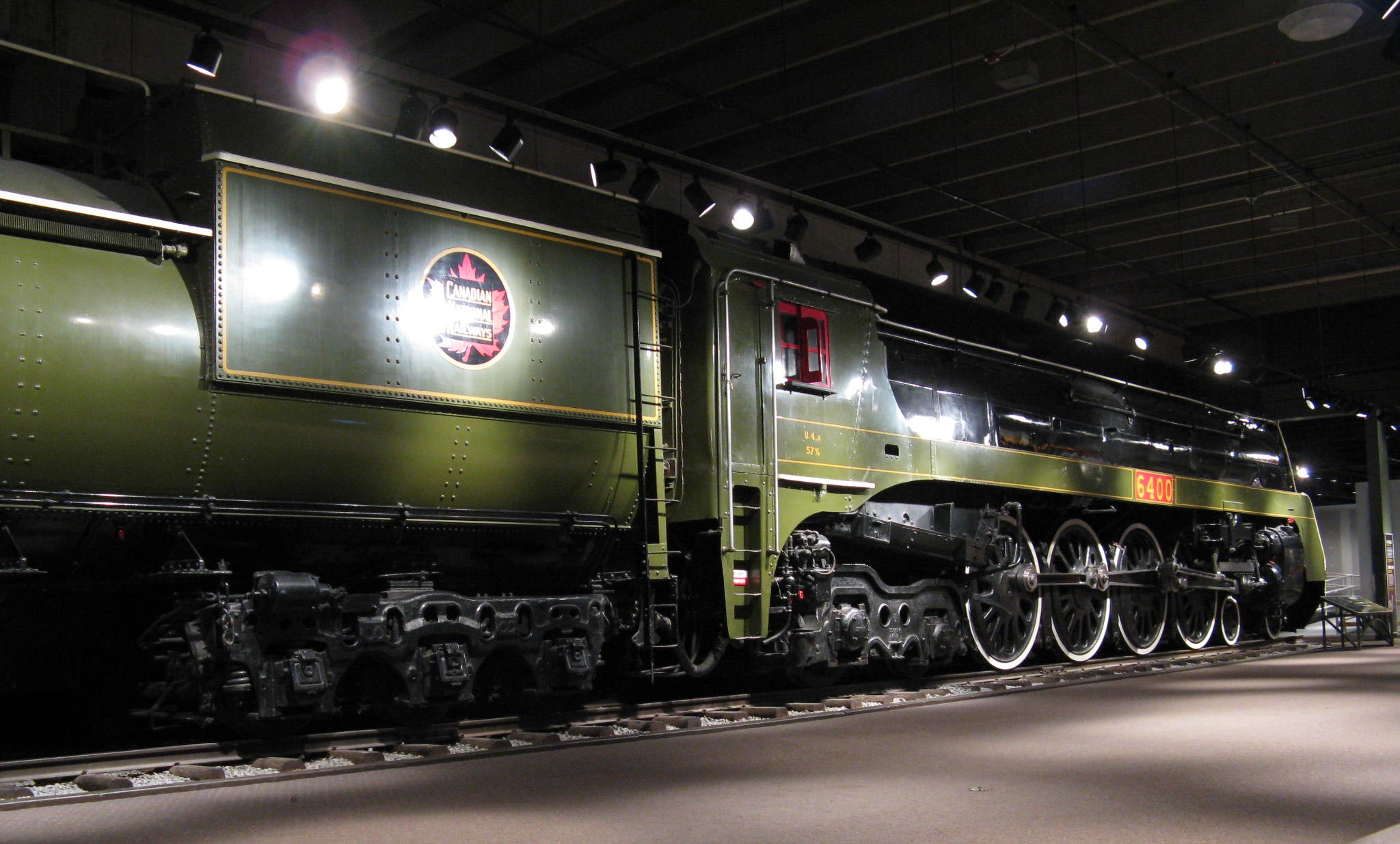
- The Canadian National No. 6400 on static display inside the Canada Science and Technology Museum
Type and origin
- Power type: Steam
- Builder: Montreal Locomotive Works
- Serial number: 68715
- Model: U-4-a
- Build date: June 1936
Specifications
- Configuration
  - Whyte: 4-8-4
- Gauge: 4 ft 8 1/2 in (1.435 m) standard gauge
- Driver dia.: 77 in (1.96 m)
- Length: 95 ft 1 in (28.98 m)
- Loco weight: 379,800 lb (172.3 t)
- Fuel type: Coal
- Fuel capacity: 40,000 lb (18 t)
- Superheater
  - Heating area: 3,861 sq ft (358.7 m^{2})
- Cylinder size: 24 in × 30 in (610 mm × 760 mm)
Performance figures
- Maximum speed: 90–110 mph (140–180 km/h)
- Tractive effort: 52,475 lbf (233.42 kN)
Career
- Operators: Canadian National
- Retired: 1960
- Preserved: 6400
- Current owner: Canada Science and Technology Museum
- Disposition: Preserved

Canadian National Railway No. 6400 is a preserved 4-8-4 “Confederation” or “Northern” type locomotive built in June 1936 for the Canadian National Railway (CNR).

It was the first member of the five streamlined U-4-a Class “6400 Series” engines to be delivered, which were the first streamlined steam locomotives in Canada. 6400 in particular is the most famous and notable, having pulled the 1939 royal train, and participating as an attraction at the New York World's Fair the same year. The locomotive was withdrawn sometime in 1960, with the remaining U-4-a locomotives being retired by 1961.

The locomotive was eventually donated and put up on static display in the National Museum of Science and Technology in Ottawa, where it has been preserved since 1967.

== History ==
=== Design and conception ===
The design of the Canadian National 6400, a semi-streamlined locomotive, was a result of wind tunnel research conducted by the National Research Council of Canada (NRC) in the 1930s. The NRC researchers were looking for ways to improve smoke clearance around the locomotive cabs of steam trains. Instead of making changes to its existing locomotive designs, CNR used the research to have an entirely new style of locomotive built.

The CNR took delivery of five 6400-series locomotives, numbered 6400–6404 and classified as U-4-a, from Montreal Locomotive Works in 1936. Intended for passenger service, primarily in southern Ontario and Quebec, these 4-8-4 Northern-type locomotives, with their sleek modern streamlined style, also became an important marketing tool for the company.

=== Revenue service ===
Shortly after 6400's completion in June 1936, it was used as an excursion locomotive out of La Prairie, Quebec, for the centennial celebrations of Canada's first railway, the Champlain and St. Lawrence Railroad, having commenced operation on July 21, 1836, with locomotive Dorchester built in England at Newcastle upon Tyne. The engine then participated in that year's Railway Centenary of Canada held at St. Johns, Quebec.

The 6400 shed its olive-green paint for a striking royal blue, as it and six other locomotives pulled the royal train carrying King George VI and Queen Elizabeth throughout Canada in May and June 1939 in the first visit to Canada by a reigning monarch.

1939 also saw the 6400, still in royal blue, make a trip to New York as an exhibit in the "World of Tomorrow" display at the New York World's Fair, alongside a few other steam locomotives, including the New York Central’s famous streamlined 4-6-4 J-3a Hudson.

=== Retirement and significance ===
After just over two decades in service, No. 6400 was retired from active service in 1960, ending up in a scrapping line at the London Reclamation Yard. However, it was quickly saved and set aside by the CN themselves for preservation, due to its significance as the first Canadian streamliner and with the 1939 royal train, as part of the Museum Train, also known as the "Journey into Yesterday".

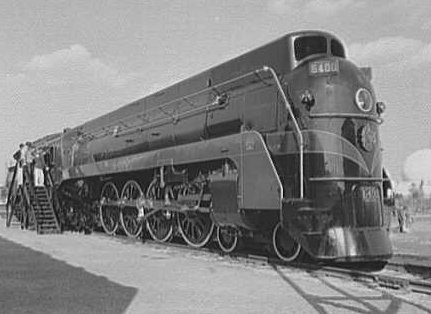
CN No. 6400 on display in 1939 during the New York World's Fair, still wearing its royal train livery.

It continued in museum train service as well as appearing at other event displays until Canada's centennial celebrations in June 1967, when the National Museum of Science and Technology in Ottawa opened, and CN subsequently donated 6400 to the museum for permanent static display. It, along with several other former CN and Canadian Pacific (CP) locomotives, including CN 5700, Canadian Pacific 1201, CP 926, CP Royal Hudson 2858 and CN 713, were carefully pushed inside their new and enclosed permanent home.

Since then, CN 6400 remains preserved on static display inside the museum's locomotive pavilion, which is now known as the Canada Science and Technology Museum.

It also remains the only sole surviving and preserved member of the U-4-a Class 6400 series, as sister locomotives 6401–6404 were retired and scrapped in the early 1960s.

== American subclass ==
=== Grand Trunk Western U-4-b ===
The 6400 series also had a near-identical subclass, that being the U-4-b Class, which was built for the Grand Trunk Western, the US subsidiary of the CNR.

They were numbered 6405–6410 and were constructed in 1938 by the Lima Locomotive Works, two years after the original U-4-a locomotives were built. While they were very similar to the original design of the U-4-a's, they had had a few visible changes, mainly the air intake on the top, which was made a little more sleek to fit with the streamlining.

These locomotives were primarily used on passenger trains, such as the Maple Leaf and the Inter-City Limited, but they were also used for occasional freight runs.

No examples of this subclass have survived into preservation, as they were all retired and scrapped, presumably from 1960 to 1961, when dieselization was common place on most major American railroads.
