= CNR Spadina Roundhouse =

The CNR Spadina Roundhouse was owned by the Canadian National Railway, built in 1927 (by Anglin-Norcross of Montreal). The purpose of Spadina Roundhouse was the pretrip inspection, service and repairing of the motive power of passenger trains, including locomotives and Budd Rail Diesel Cars terminating, or originating at Toronto Union Station.

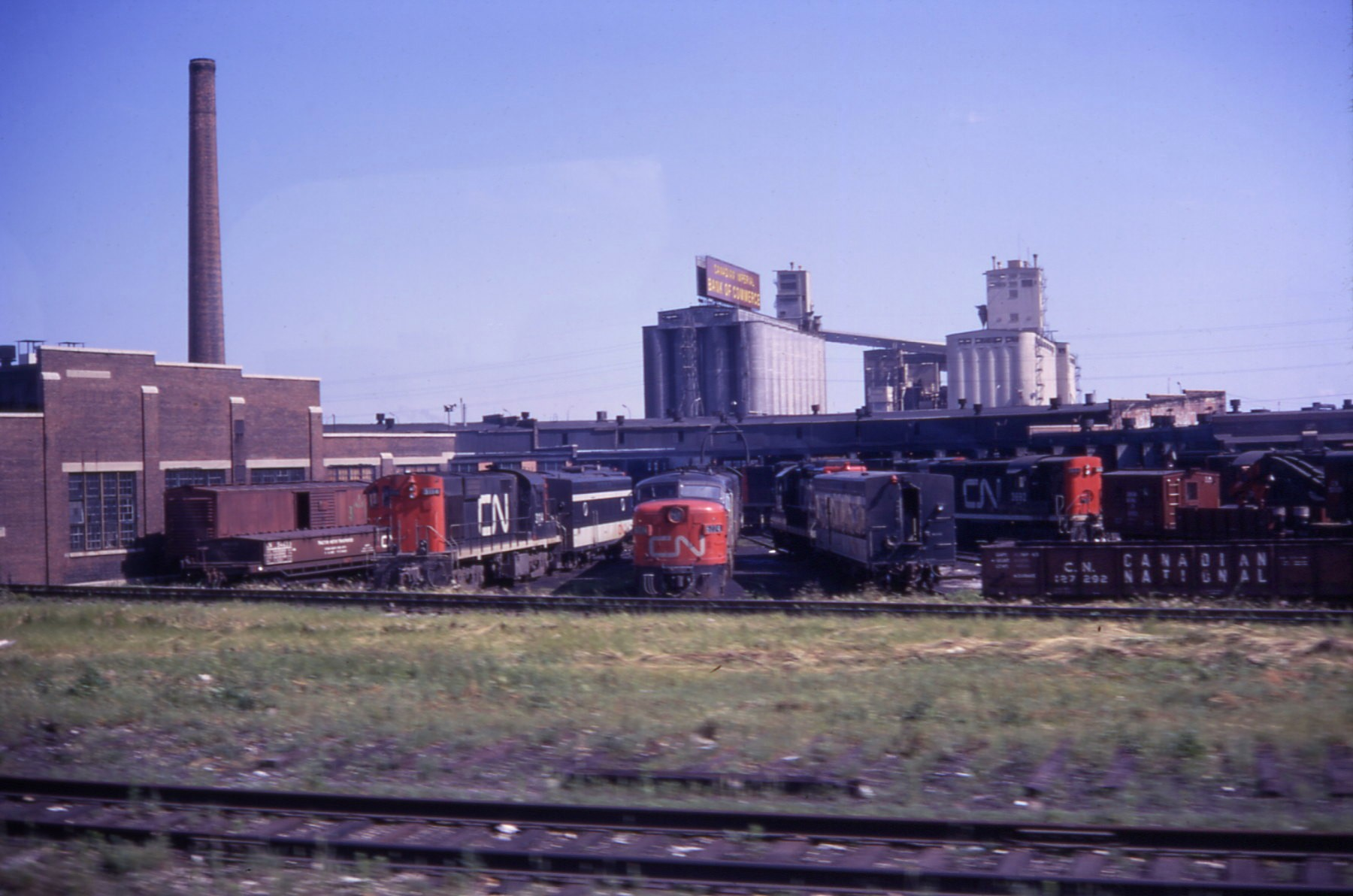
Locomotives at the Spadina Roundhouse in 1968, 18 years before demolition

Spadina Roundhouse was located in the rail yard, south of Front Street, on the east side of Spadina Avenue. Other facilities included a wheel shop, passenger car repair track and paint shop. A coach yard was located west of Spadina Avenue.

The Spadina Roundhouse and the Canadian Pacific Railway John Street Roundhouse, now the home of the Steam Whistle brewery, were two of hundreds of roundhouses in North America in the 1930s. On October 31, 1970, the famous steam locomotive "Flying Scotsman" was stored in the roundhouse, where it remained until it’s 1971 run to San Francisco.

The Spadina Roundhouse was demolished in 1986, and SkyDome, now Rogers Centre, was built in its place.

== See also ==
- CPR John Street Roundhouse
