= Canadian National 6213 =

Preserved CN class U-2-g 4-8-4 locomotive

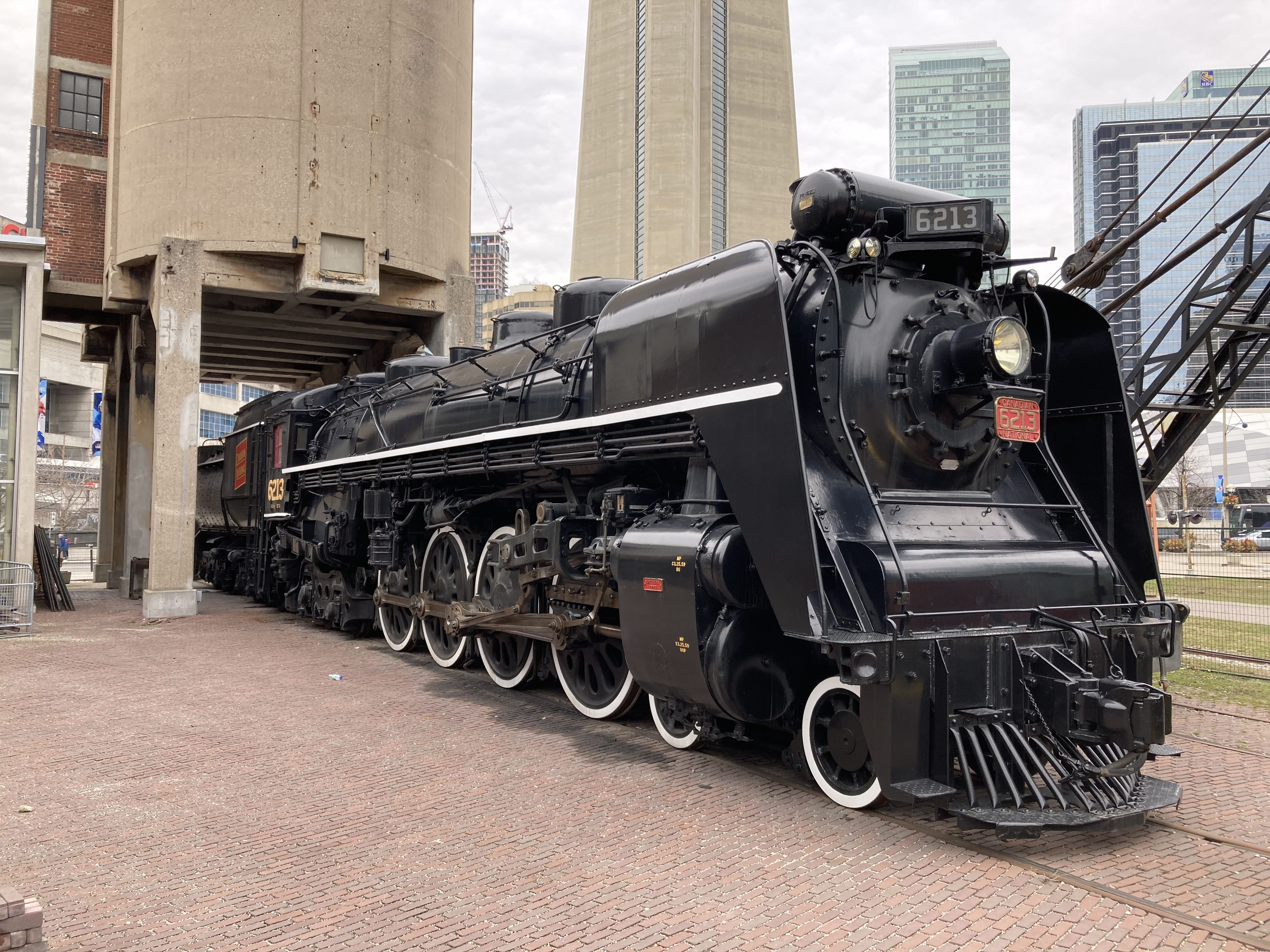
- The Canadian National Railway's locomotive 6213 at John Street Roundhouse in Toronto, April 2023
Type and origin
- Power type: Steam
- Designer: MLW
- Builder: Montreal Locomotive Works
- Order number: Q394
- Serial number: 69711
- Model: U-2-g
- Build date: August 1942
Specifications
- Configuration
  - Whyte: 4-8-4
  - UIC: 2′D2′ h2
- Gauge: 4 ft 8 1/2 in (1,435 mm)
- Leading dia.: 34 1/2 in (0.876 m)
- Driver dia.: 73 in (1.854 m)
- Trailing dia.: 34 1/2 in (0.876 m); 43 in (1.092 m)
- Tender wheels: 34 1/2 in (0.876 m)
- Wheelbase: 82 ft 4 3/4 in (25.114 m)
  - Engine: 43 ft 10 in (13.360 m)
  - Leading: 6 ft 10 in (2.083 m)
  - Drivers: 19 ft 6 in (5.944 m)
  - Trailing: 5 ft 8 in (1.727 m)
  - Tender: 26 ft 0 in (7.925 m)
  - Tender truck: 8 ft 4 in (2.540 m)
- Length: 94 ft 9 3/8 in (28.889 m)
- Adhesive weight: 244,500 lb (110.9 tonnes)
- Loco weight: 400,300 lb (181.6 tonnes)
- Tender weight: 278,000 lb (126 tonnes)
- Total weight: 678,300 lb (307.7 tonnes)
- Tender type: 6-axle Vanderbilt
- Fuel type: Coal
- Fuel capacity: 18 long tons (18 t)
- Water cap.: 11,600 imp gal (53,000 L; 13,900 US gal)
- Firebox
  - Type
  - Grate area: 84.3 sq ft (7.83 m^{2})
- Boiler pressure: 250 lbf/in^{2} (1.72 MPa)
- Feedwater heater: Elesco
- Heating surface
  - Firebox: 414 sq ft (38.5 m^{2})
  - Tubes and flues: 3,666 sq ft (340.6 m^{2})
  - Total surface: 4,080 sq ft (379 m^{2})
- Superheater
  - Type: Schmidt type E
  - Heating area: 1,835 sq ft (170.5 m^{2})
- Cylinders: Two, outside
- Cylinder size: 25 1/2 in × 30 in (648 mm × 762 mm)
- Valve gear: Walschaerts
Performance figures
- Tractive effort: 56,786 lbf (252.60 kN)
Career
- Operators: Canadian National Railways
- Class: U-2-g
- Power class: 57%
- Number in class: 14th of 35
- Retired: 1959
- Preserved: 1960
- Restored: 2019 (cosmetically)
- Current owner: The City of Toronto - under the stewardship of the Toronto Locomotive Preservation Society (TLPS) and the Toronto Railway Museum
- Disposition: On static display

Canadian National 6213 is a preserved 4-8-4 "Northern" type steam locomotive on static display in Toronto, Ontario, Canada at the Toronto Railway Museum (TRM) on the lands of the former CPR John St. Roundhouse. It was on active duty until 1959 and was donated by Canadian National Railway (CNR) to the City of Toronto government in 1960. It was on display at Exhibition Place until 2009 when it was moved to its current location (43.641378°N 79.38645°W).

== History ==
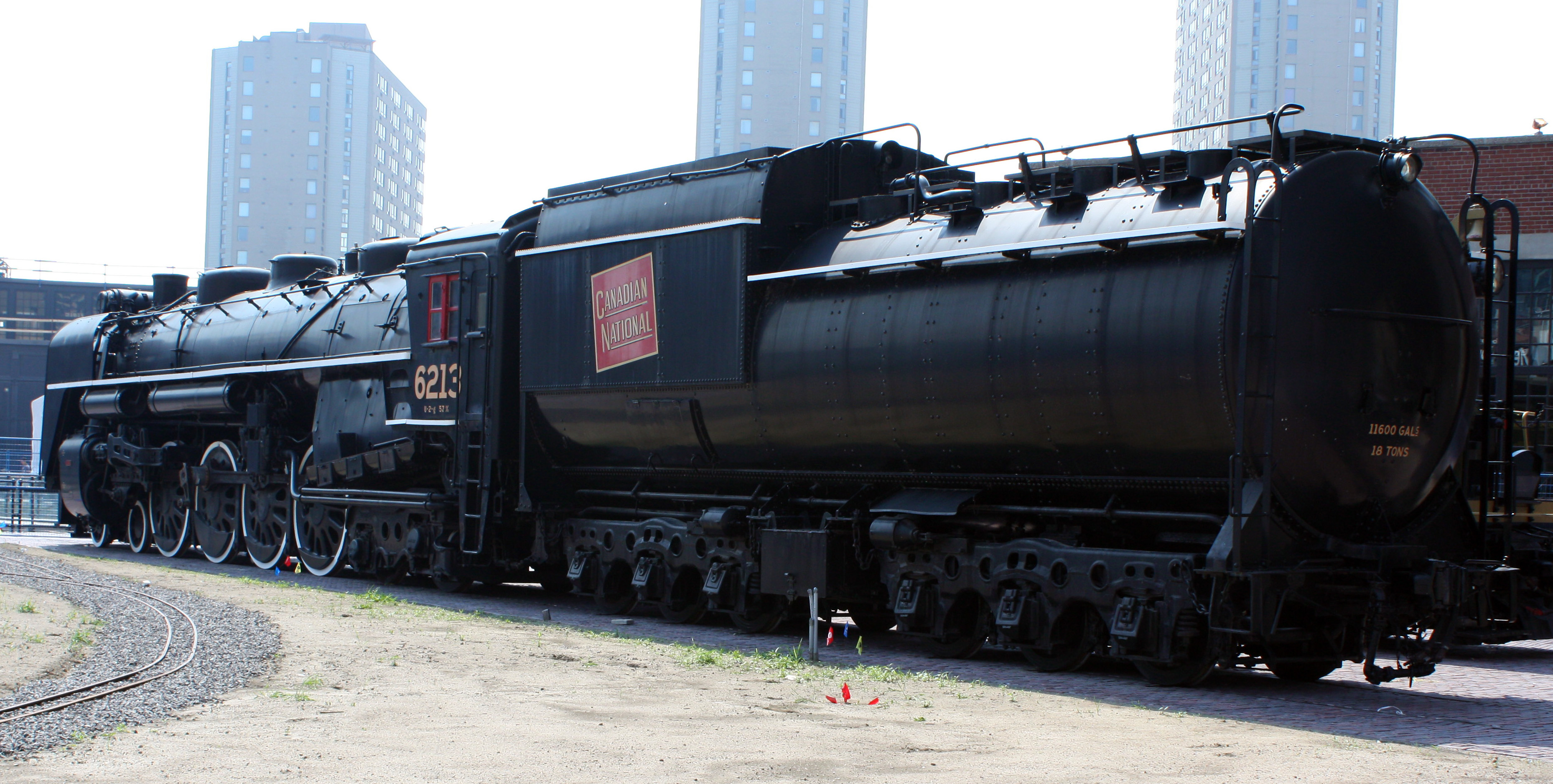
CN 6213 at John Street Roundhouse in Toronto, Aug 2009

No. 6213 was built in 1942 at the Montreal Locomotive Works (MLW). It was part of the Canadian National Railway's (CNR) fleet of 200 U-2-g class "Confederations", later "Northerns". No.6213 was retired from active duty in 1959. At the request of the City of Toronto government, the locomotive was donated by CNR to the City of Toronto government in 1960 and put on static display at Exhibition Place. At the request of the Parks Department, it was placed beside the Stanley Barracks' Officers' Quarters, delivered there by temporary rail track. It was officially turned over to the Mayor of Toronto Nathan Phillips on September 8, 1960.

Since 6213's retirement, the members of The Toronto Locomotive Preservation Society (TLPS), her primary caretaker, have faithfully worked to preserve the locomotive. It was moved to the John St. Roundhouse in 2009 at a cost of CA$150,000, paid for by Leon's Furniture, which opened a store in the Roundhouse. The turntable and small trackage at the Roundhouse allows for the locomotive to be pushed and pulled into various spurs of the Toronto Railway Museum park. This has enhanced the TLPS' ability to inspect, grease and lube her moving parts, something key to her ongoing mechanical wellness and preservation.

Plans are in the works for the summer of 2019, wherein the engine and tender will be subject to a significant cosmetic restoration. This will be the second significant makeover 6213 has had since retirement and reflects the City of Toronto's ongoing financial commitment to preserve its above-average condition "park locomotive".

No. 6213 had only recently been through a significant refit at CNR's Stratford Shops before retirement and is, therefore, an ideal candidate for restoration to live steam at some point in the future. The TLPS continues to explore possible options of restoring this locomotive to operating condition.

== See also ==
- Canadian National 6218
- CN U-2, U-3, and U-4, Series, and CP K1a 4-8-4
- Roundhouse Park
