= Roundhouse Park =

Park in Toronto, Ontario, Canada

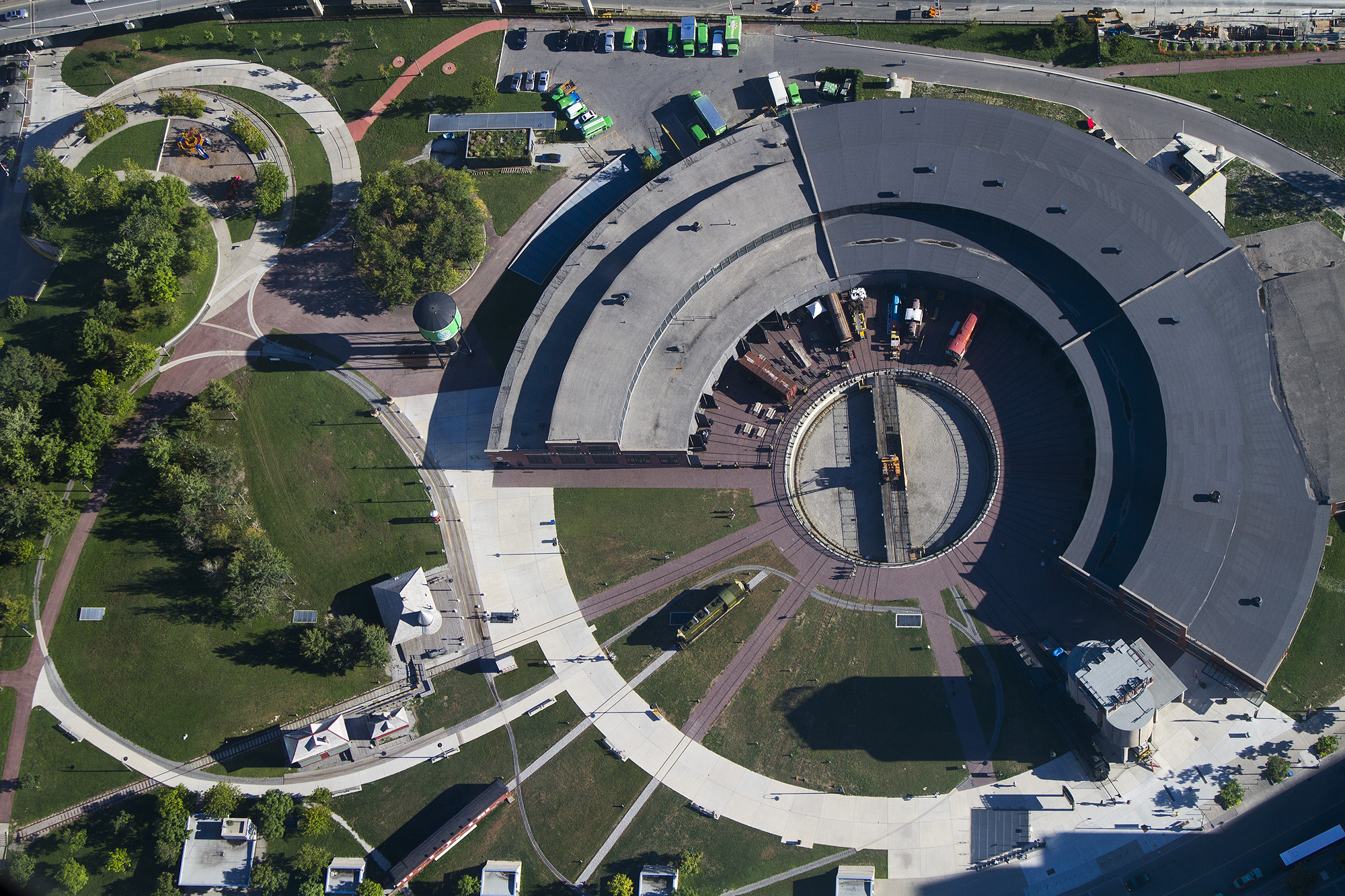
- Viewed from the CN Tower
- Interactive map of Roundhouse Park
- Location: 255 Bremner Boulevard, Toronto, Ontario, Canada
- Coordinates: 43°38′28″N 79°23′07″W
- Operator: Toronto Parks
- Website: www.toronto.ca/data/parks/prd/facilities/complex/386/index.html

Roundhouse Park is 6.9 hectares (17 acres) in the downtown core of Toronto, Ontario, Canada. It is in the former Railway Lands and features the John Street Roundhouse, a preserved locomotive roundhouse that houses the Toronto Railway Museum, Steam Whistle Brewing, and the Rec Room restaurant and entertainment complex. The park is also home to a collection of railway cars and locomotives, the former Canadian Pacific Railway Don Station, and the Roundhouse Park Miniature Railway. The park is bounded by Bremner Boulevard, Lower Simcoe Street, Lake Shore Boulevard West/Gardiner Expressway, and Rees Street.

== History ==
The John Street Roundhouse was built in 1929–1931 and renovated in the 1990s. In 1997, the area to the east of the building became the city-owned Roundhouse Park.

In 2010, the Toronto Railway Museum opened in three stalls of the roundhouse and its environs. It has an indoor display and restoration facility and a full-size diesel cab simulator. Outside is a miniature railway, numerous railway engines and rolling stock, and a fully restored railway village that includes Don Station, Signal Cabin D (moved to Roundhouse Park from the City's collection of historic buildings), a watchman's shanty, a water tower, and a coaling tower.

=== John Street Roundhouse ===
John Street Roundhouse
- Interactive map of John Street Roundhouse
- Location: Canada

History
- Built: 1931
- Built for: Canadian Pacific Railway
- Original use: Roundhouse

Site notes
- Current use: Toronto Railway Museum; Steam Whistle Brewery The Rec Room
- Governing body: City of Toronto

National Historic Site of Canada
- Designated: 1990

Ontario Heritage Act
- Official name: Union Station Heritage Conservation District
- Designated: October 3, 2008

The John Street Roundhouse was built for the Canadian Pacific Railway (CPR) in 1929–1931 by Anglin-Norcross to replace the earlier John Street roundhouse built in 1897. Trains were so properly maintained at this location that railroaders recognized them by their "John Street polish". After the arrival of diesel locomotives, business slowed at the roundhouse, and the building was last used for its original purpose in 1986. The CPR donated the roundhouse to the City of Toronto.

It is the only remaining roundhouse in downtown Toronto (the CNR Spadina Roundhouse was demolished to make way for construction of the SkyDome). One-third of the original structure was dismantled, to allow construction of the Metro Toronto Convention Centre below, then reconstructed (1995) by Hotson Bakker Architects and is now home to Steam Whistle Brewing. Renovations to the brewery interior were done by William Hurst Architects. The remaining two-thirds was rehabilitated by IBI Group Architects and now house the Toronto Railway Museum and Cineplex's Rec Room entertainment complex. Roundhouse Park with the restored wooden railway buildings, the turntable and courtyard was also completed by IBI and received design awards. The SkyWalk retains a direct connection from Roundhouse Park to Union Station.

John Street Roundhouse could maintain 32 locomotives at a time. 32 bay doors make up the inner rounded façade of the building and face the 120-foot (37 m) turntable. This turntable was the largest on the CPR and was constructed by the Canadian Bridge Company. The exterior and interior of the building are mostly composed of brick and glazing. Each of the bay doors is of wood construction and can be left open to reveal a floor-to-ceiling glass wall with a regular-sized man door inset. Natural light floods the interior space from the curved loft space and all exterior façades. Refurbished wooden columns also stand within the interior of the structure. The coaling tower and water tank are auxiliary structures still in the park from the working days of the John Street Roundhouse.

The John Street Roundhouse was designated a national historic site of Canada in 1990.

The roundhouse and associated structures were first protected under Part IV of the Ontario Heritage Act, passed by Toronto City Council on August 12, 1996. It was then designated under Part V of the act with by-law 634-2006 passed on July 27, 2006, as part of the Union Station Heritage Conservation District (encompassing the park, Union Station and the Royal York Hotel).

=== Toronto Railway Museum ===
Toronto Railway Museum
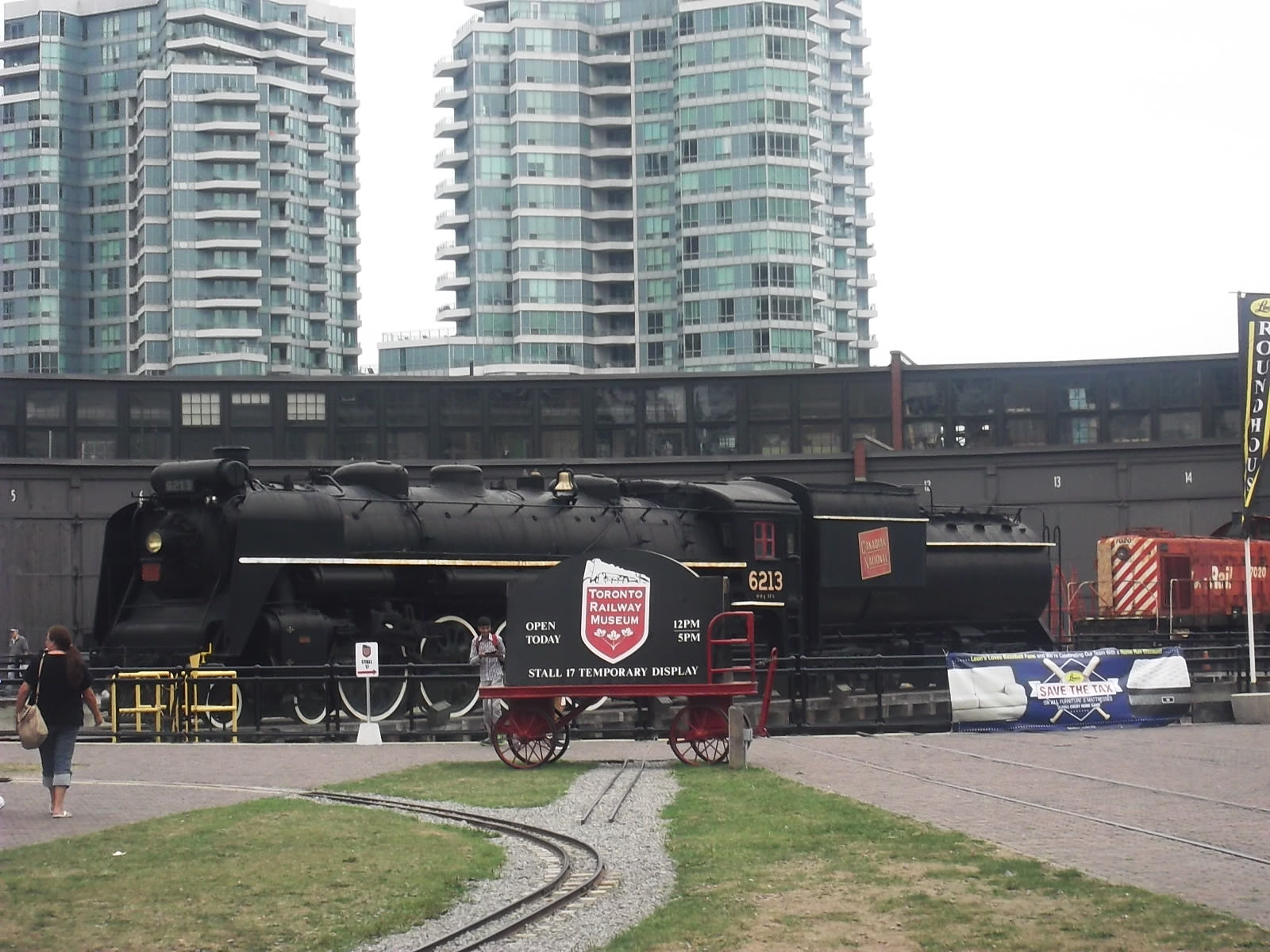
- Established: May 2010
- Location: Toronto, Ontario, Canada
- Type: Transport museum
- Collection size: See below
- Public transit access: St. Andrew station and Union Station
- Website: Official Site

The Toronto Railway Museum opened on May 28, 2010, and operates year-round.

The museum is supported by the Toronto Railway Historical Association, a federally registered charity that was established in 2001 and whose main focus is developing the museum.

During warmer months, it operates the Miniature Railway, opened in 2010. Hauled by a replica MPI MP40 diesel electric locomotive or replica CLC diesel-electric Whitcomb centre-cab switcher, the ride has four cars carrying five passengers each plus a caboose.

Tickets for the miniature railway are sold at the Don station, built in 1896 by the Canadian Pacific Railway on Queen Street East along the western bank of the Don River. In 1969, it was moved to Todmorden Mills, where it long sat boarded up. It was moved to Roundhouse Park, where it was repaired and repainted for use as a ticket office.

==== Collection ====
Roundhouse Park contains five full-sized locomotives, one cab, one narrow gauge locomotive, one cab car, three freight cars, three passenger cars and one crane.

- Canadian National Railway No. 6213 U-2-G 4-8-4 MLW 1942 – formerly located at Exhibition Place
- Plymouth Cordage 5X10 0-4-0CA H.K. Porter, Inc. 1906 – formerly located at Andrew Merrilees Co.
- Canadian Pacific No. 7020 Class DS10-B, Alco S-2 1944
- Canadian National Railway No. 4803 GMD GP7 1953
- Canadian Pacific No. 7069 Baldwin DS-4-4-1000 1948
- Canadian National Railway No. 9159 GMD F7 1951 (cab only)
- Canadian Locomotive Company 50-ton Whitcomb centre-cab switcher 1950
- GO Transit Hawker Siddeley RTC-85SP/D cab car 104, built 1967
- Canadian Pacific Jackman sleeper 1931
- Canadian Pacific Cape Race buffet-compartment-solarium-observation-sleeper, 1929
- Dominion Atlantic Railway Sans Pareil (now Nova Scotia) Pullman dining car built in 1896
- Toronto, Hamilton & Buffalo Railway caboose No. 70, steel sheathed, 1921
- Canadian Pacific Railway 188625 – "Fowler" steel-frame boxcar, built 1917
- Reinhart Vinegars RVLX 101 – wooden vinegar tank car, built 1938
- Toronto Terminals Railway (TTR) – Pyke self-propelled crane

== Gallery ==
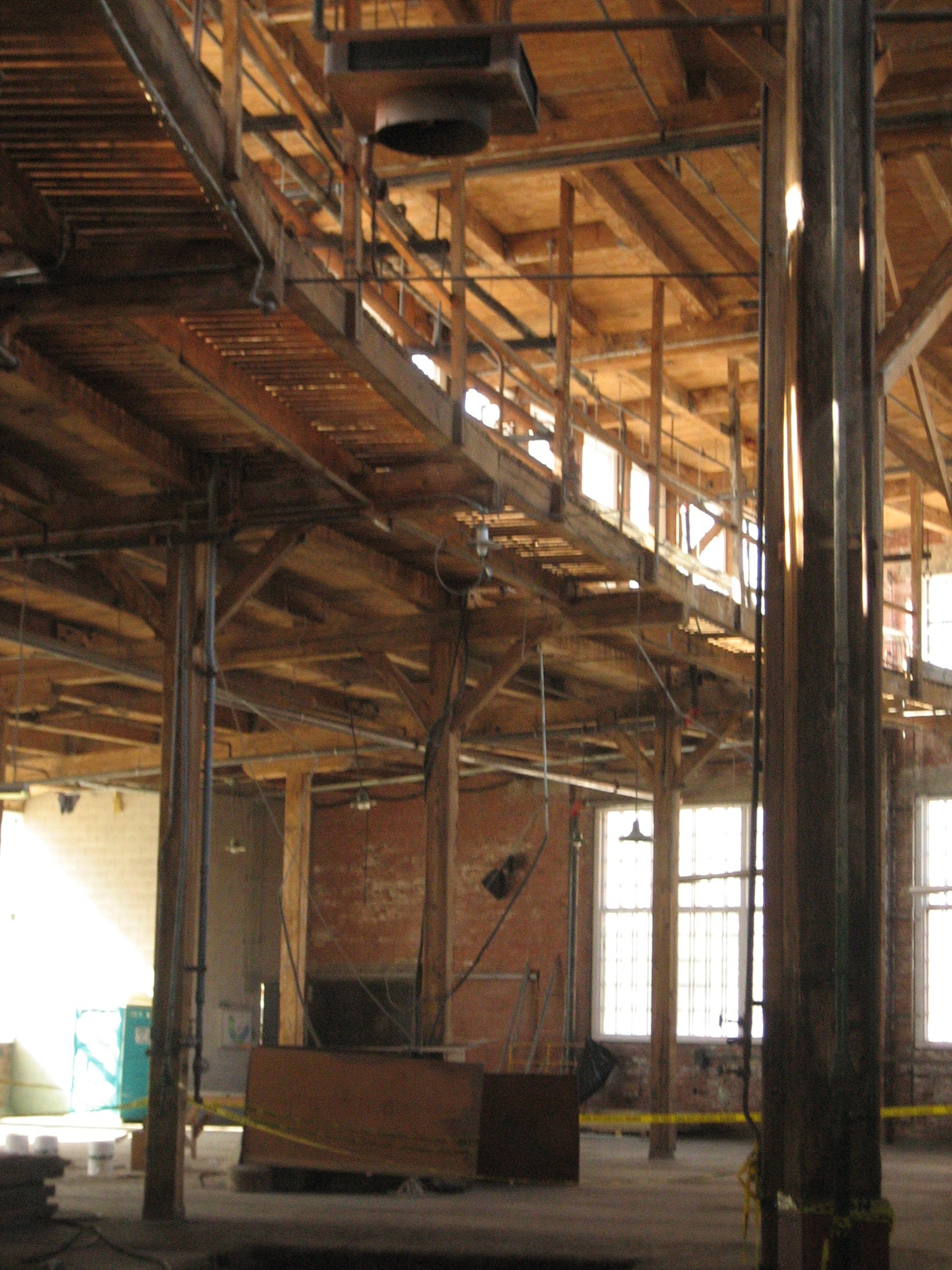
Inside the unfinished portion of the Roundhouse in May 2008

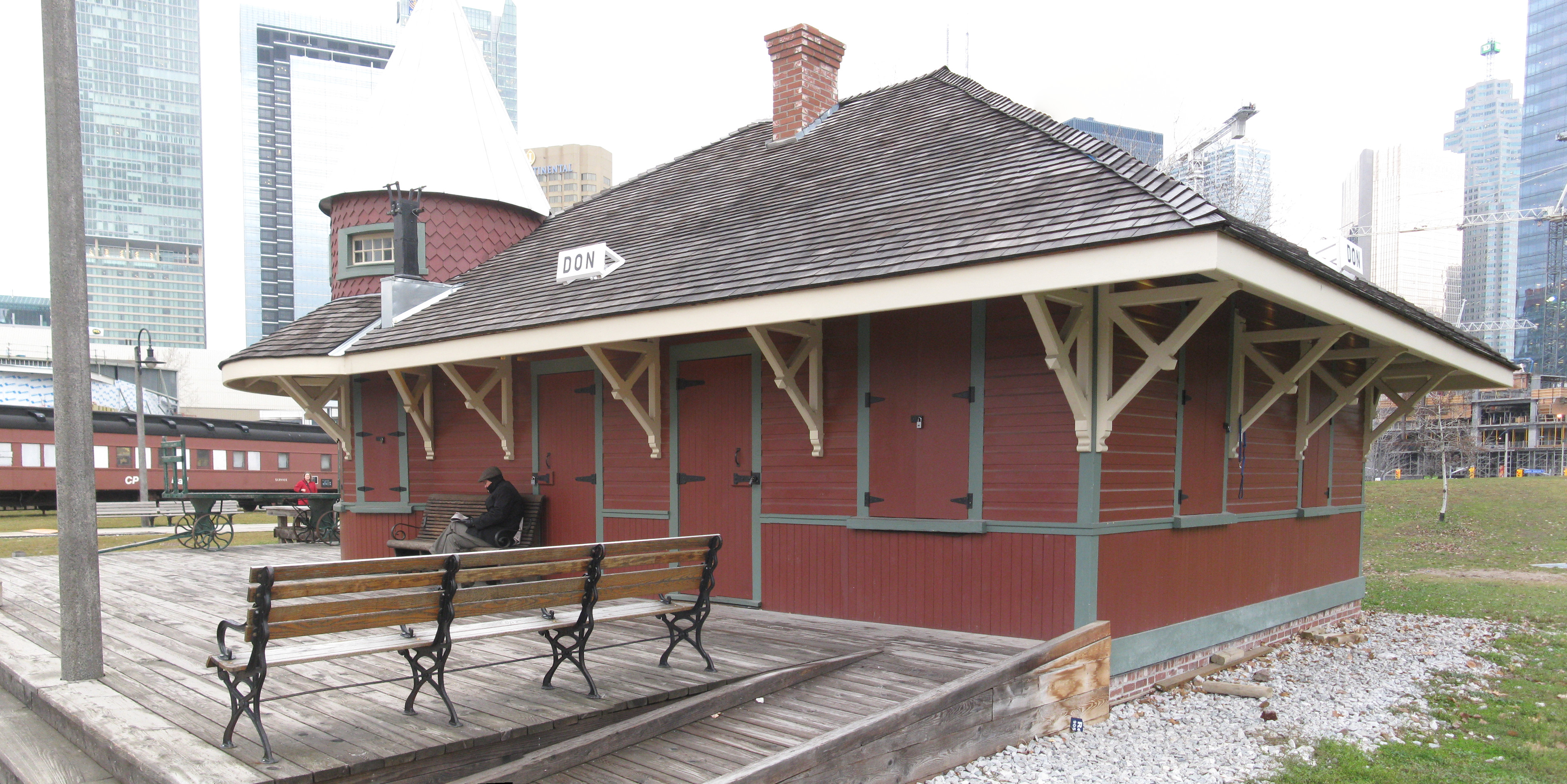
The Don Station

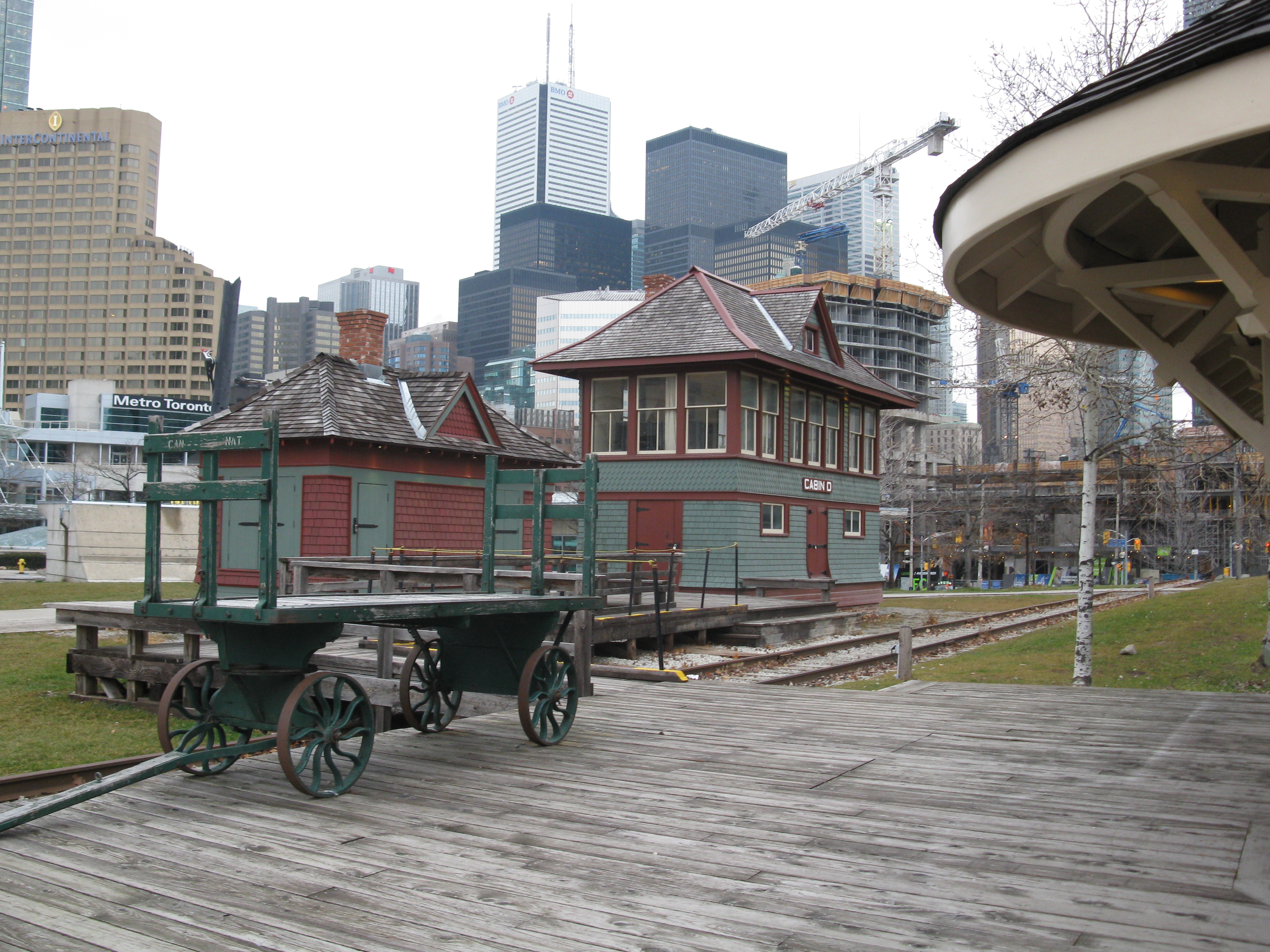
Cabin D

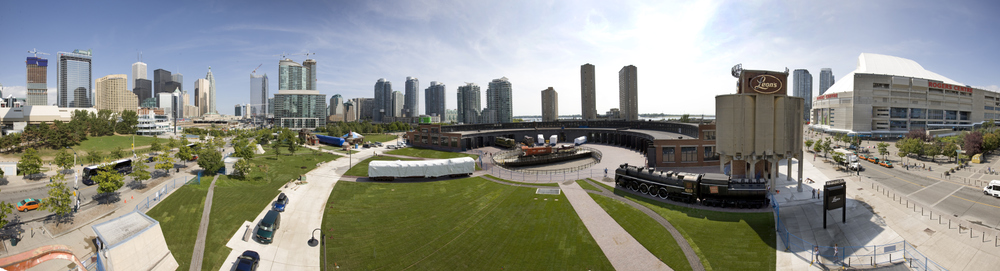
Panoramic View of Roundhouse Park

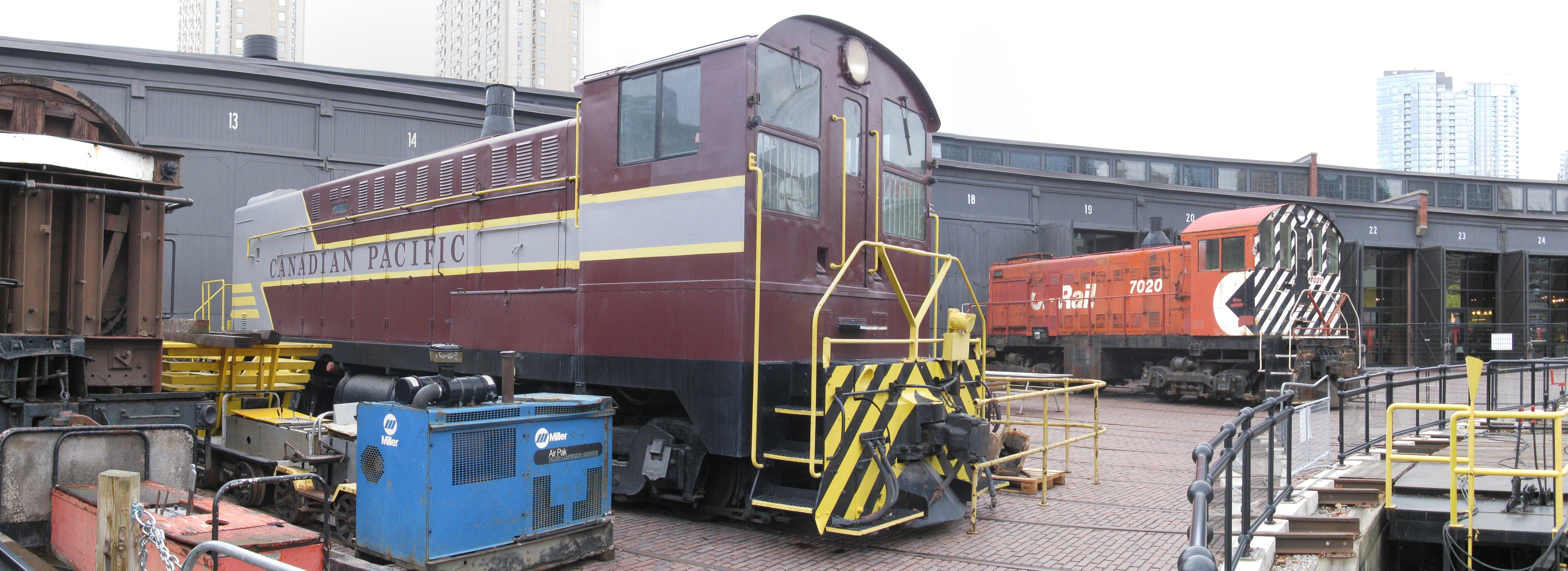
CP 7069 (center), a Baldwin DS4-4-1000, and CP 7020 (right), an ALCO S-2, sit at the roundhouse.

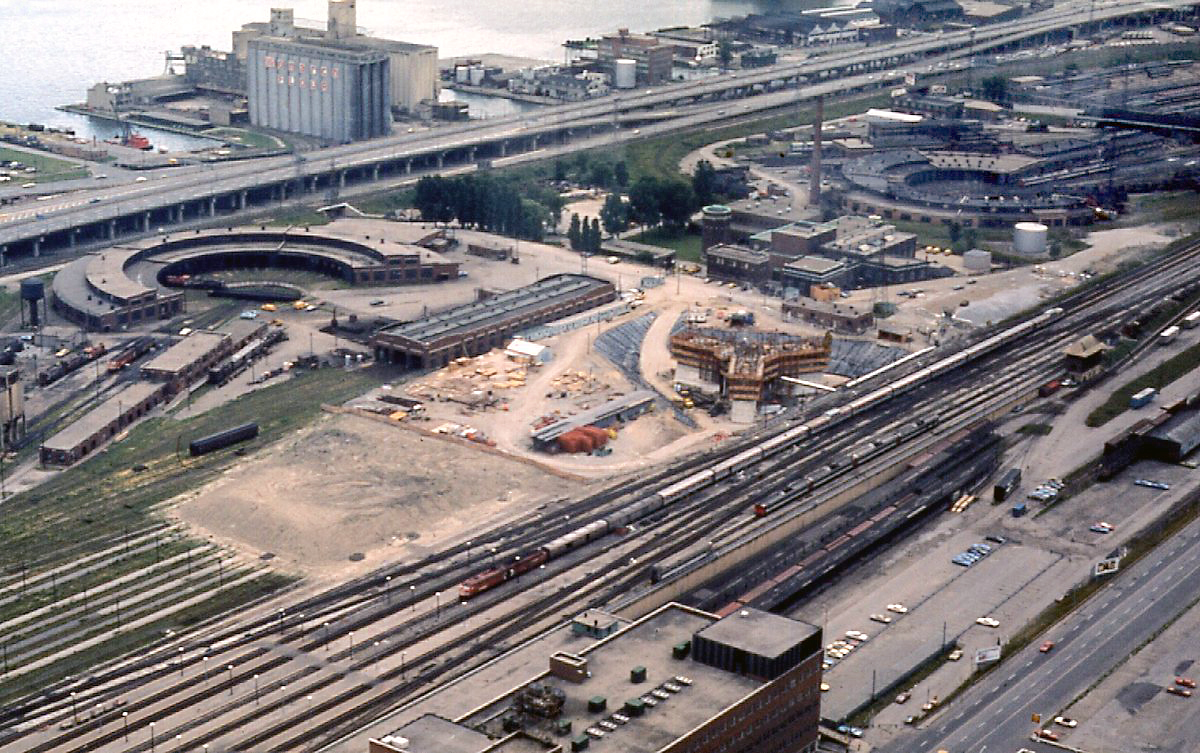
John Street Roundhouse (left) in 1973. The roundhouse on the right was CNR Spadina Roundhouse, which was demolished. Rogers Centre stands in its place.

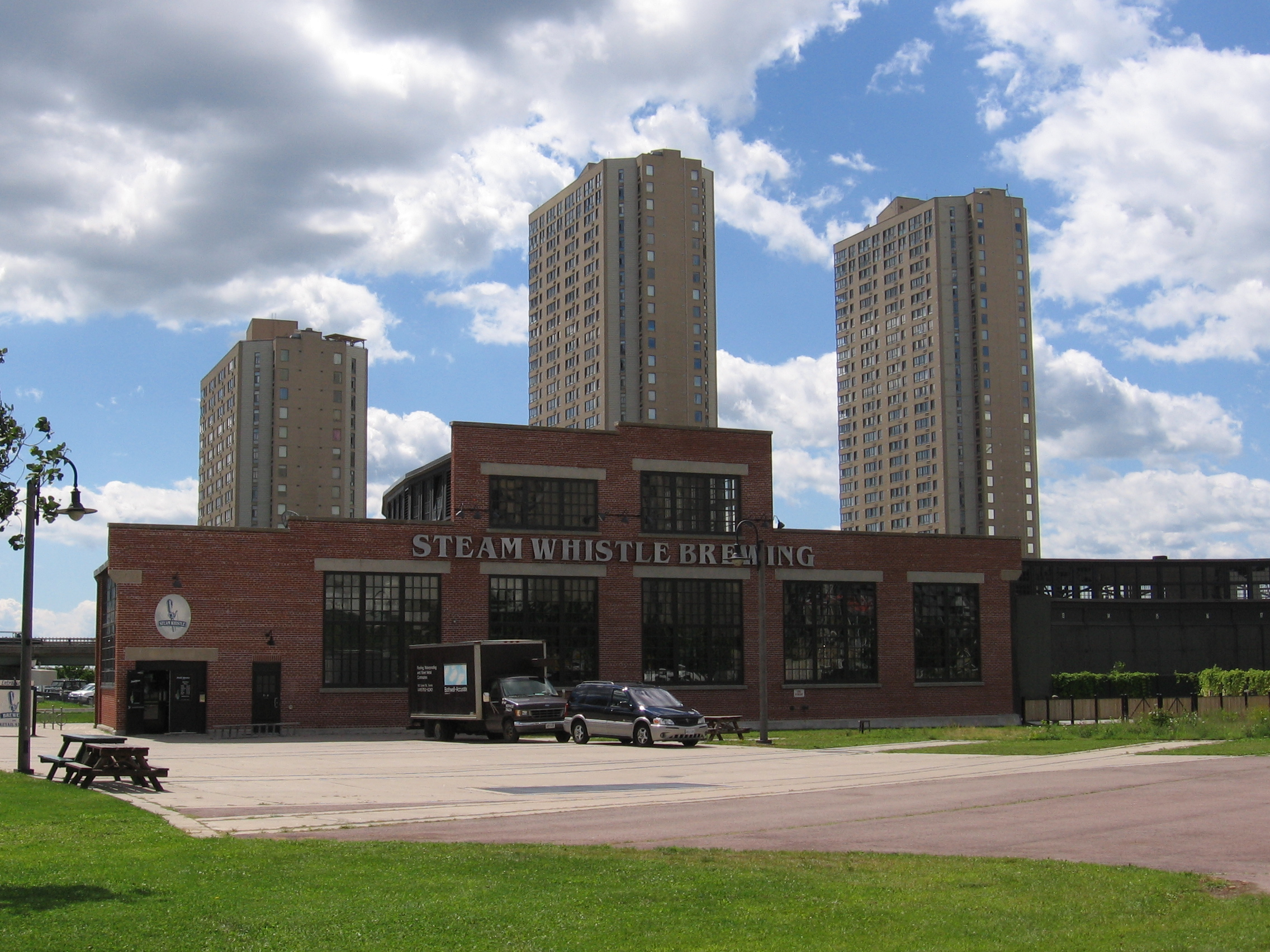
Steam Whistle Brewing

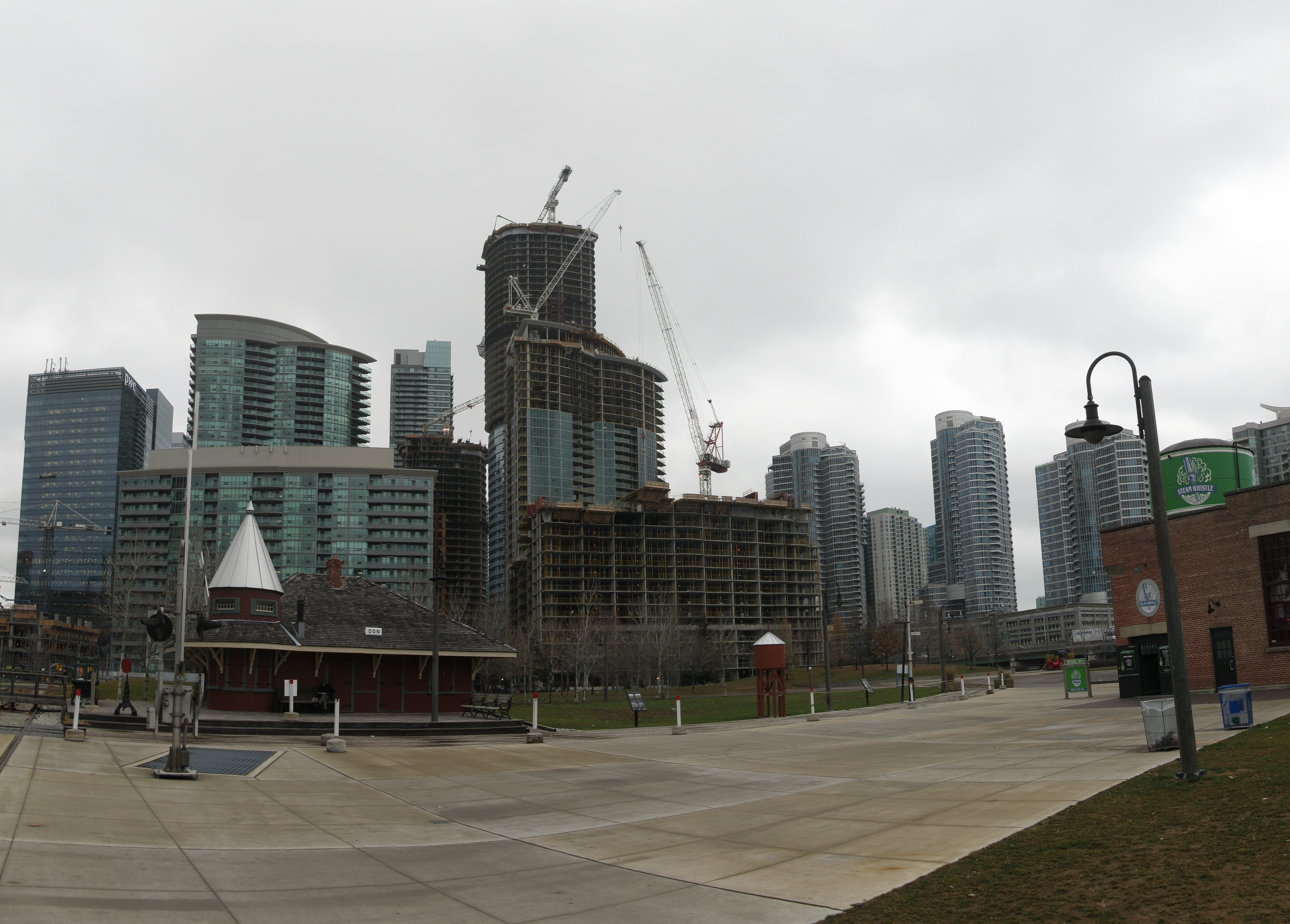
Condos next to the park

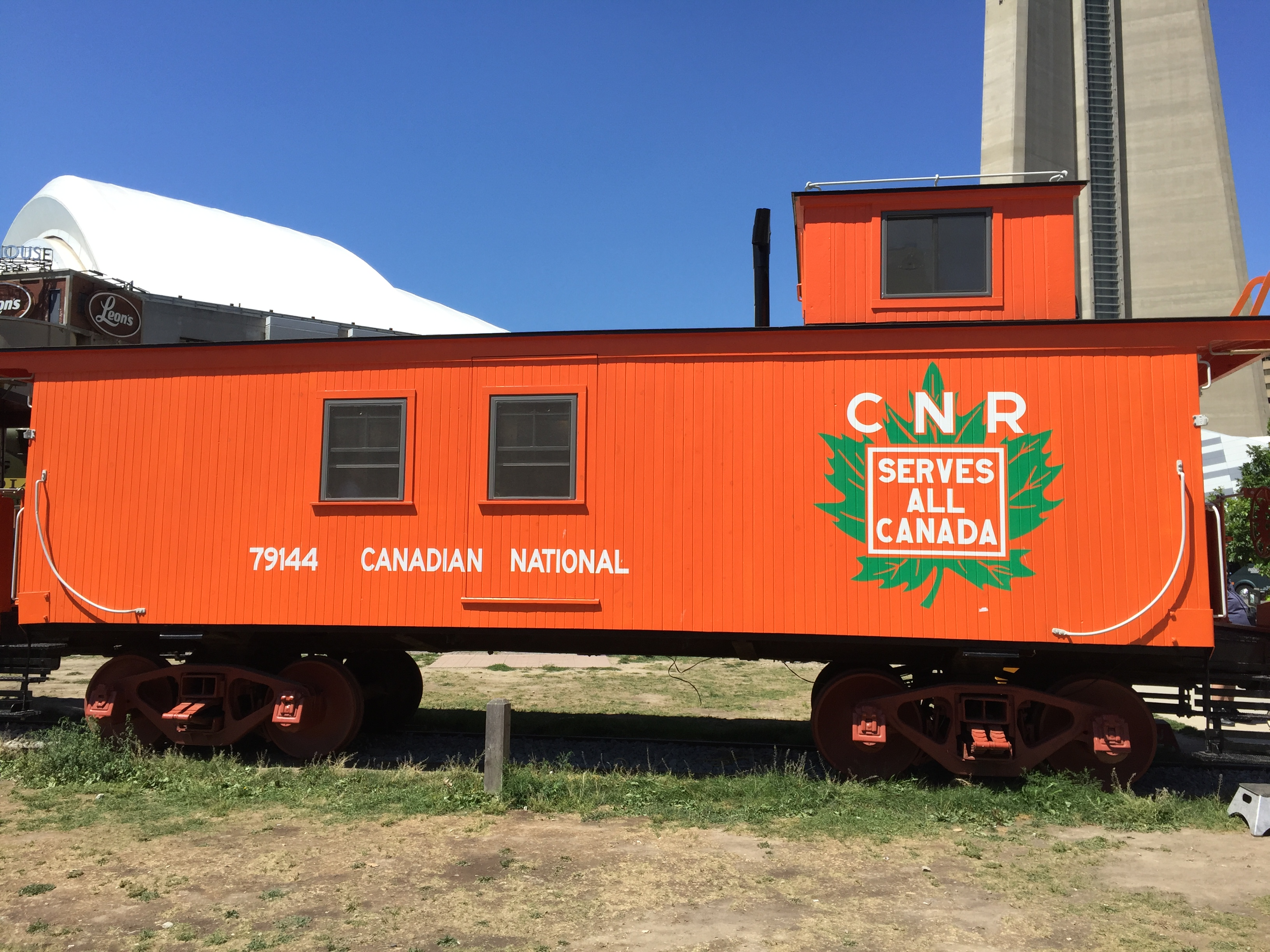
79144 Canadian National Railway

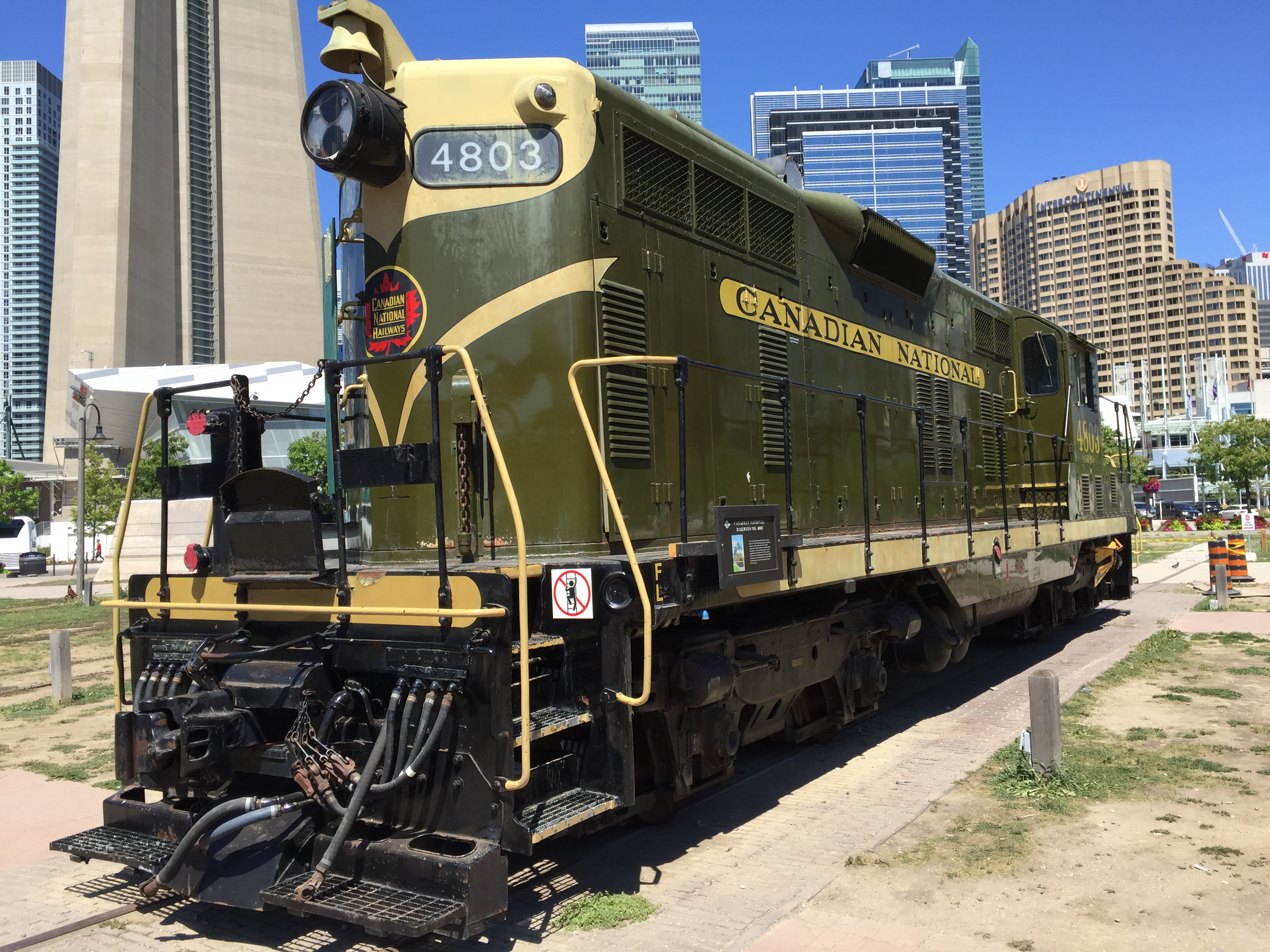
CN GP7 #4803 is shown in CN's old "Olive Green" livery.

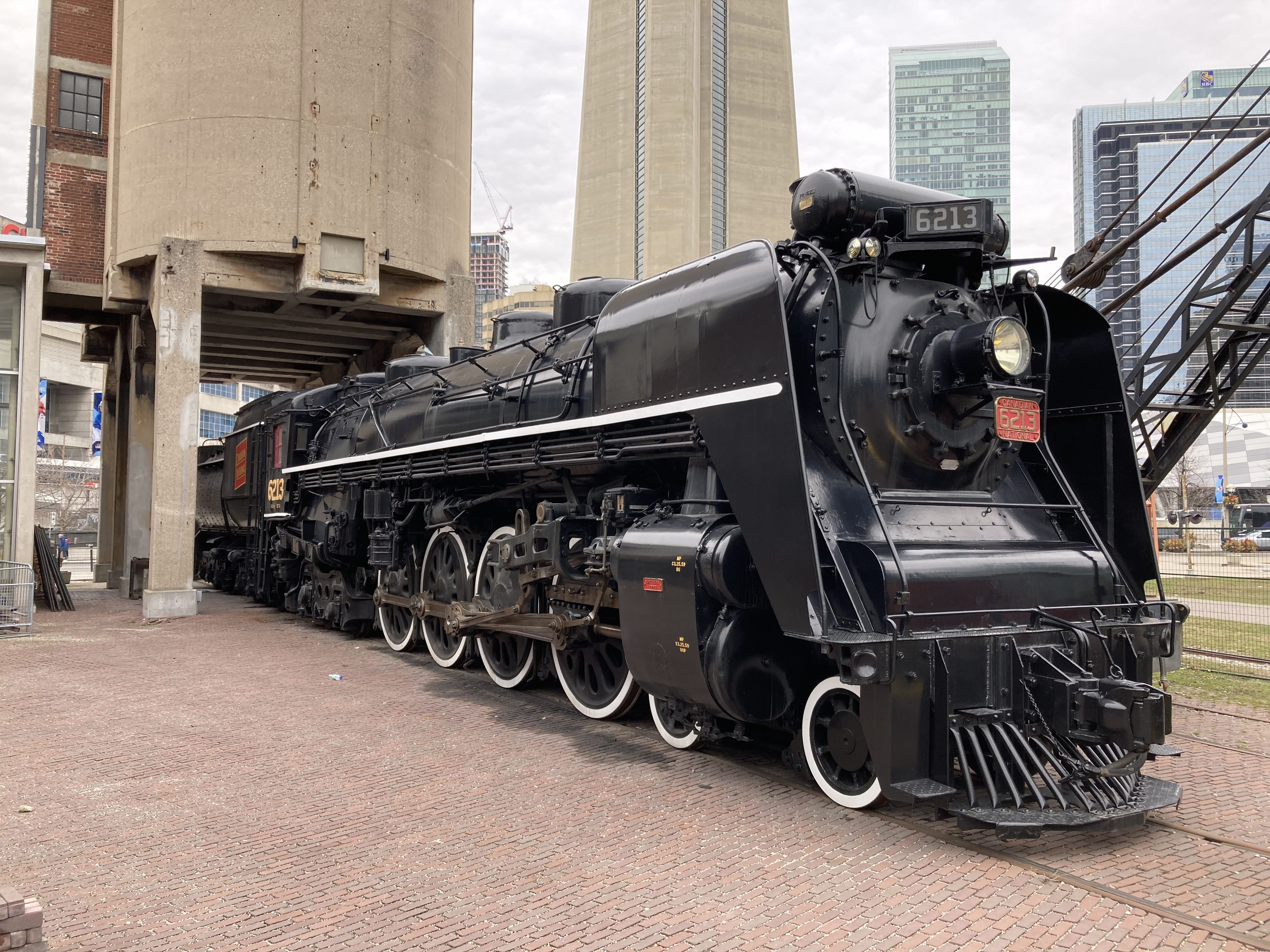
Canadian National Railway locomotive 6213 at the Toronto Railway Museum

== Other Toronto roundhouses ==
- CNR Spadina Roundhouse demolished 1986 to make way for Rogers Centre
- CPR Lambton Roundhouse at St. Clair Avenue West and Runnymede Road, 1912–1913 (demolished 1960)
- CPR West Toronto Roundhouse, 1884, 1891 (demolished 2001)
- CPR Parkdale Roundhouse, King and Queen at Dufferin Street, 1891 by Credit Valley Railway; machinery and turntable moved to John Street Roundhouse in 1897; last used 1907
- CNR Mimico 34-stall Roundhouse, Mimico Yard (current site of the Via Toronto Maintenance Centre), built in 1913 by the Grand Trunk Railway, demolished in 1969 after a 1965 fire
- CNR Danforth 31-stall Roundhouse, south and across the tracks from current Danforth GO station, 1884 by the Grand Trunk Railway, torn down 1940's
