= Grand Trunk Western 6325 =

Preserved GTW U-3-b class 4-8-4 locomotive

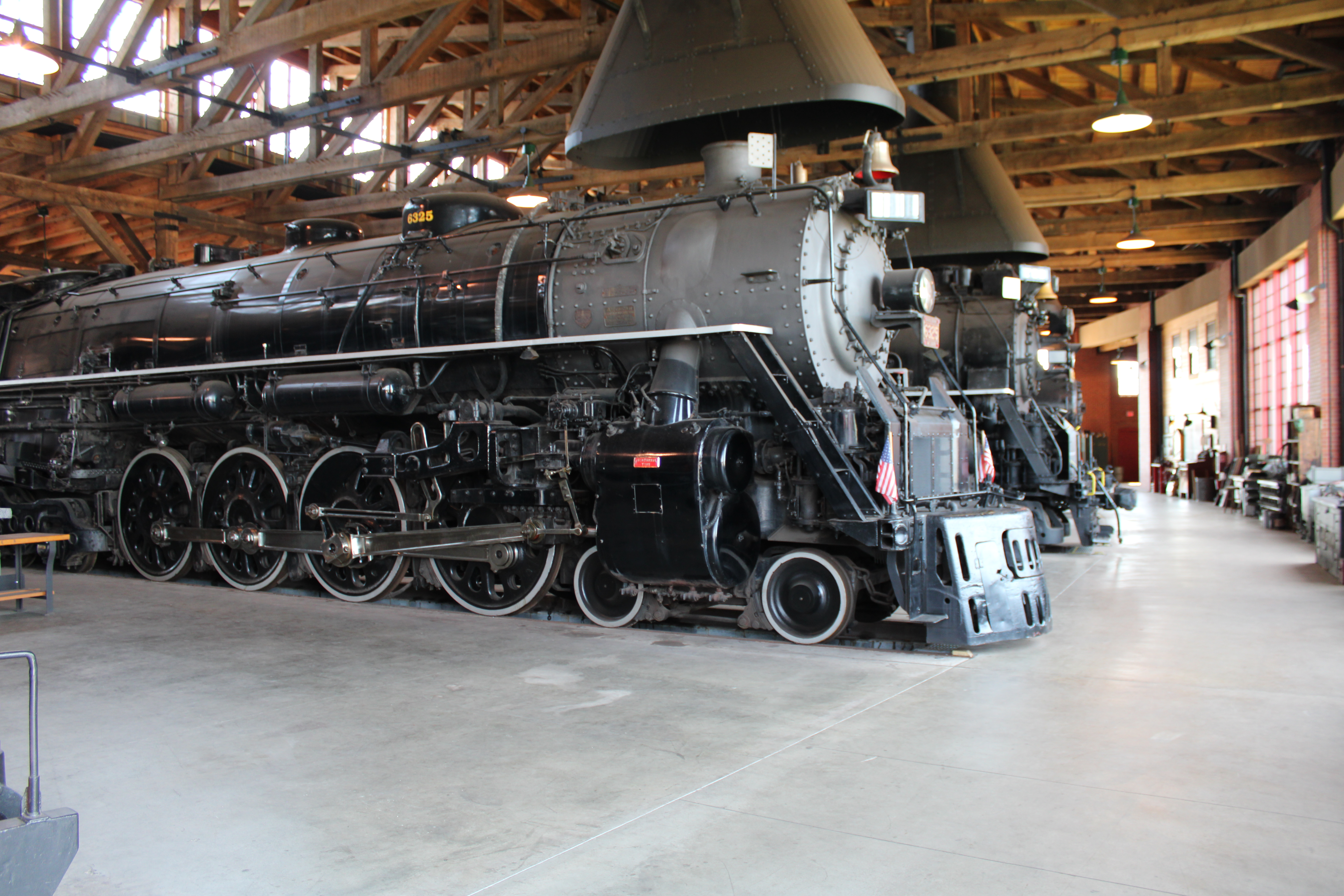
- Grand Trunk Western No. 6325 on static display at the Age of Steam Roundhouse in April 2022
Type and origin
- Power type: Steam
- Builder: American Locomotive Company
- Order number: S-1847
- Serial number: 69631
- Build date: February 1942
Specifications
- Configuration
  - Whyte: 4-8-4
- Gauge: 4 ft 8 1/2 in (1,435 mm)
- Leading dia.: 33 in (838 mm)
- Driver dia.: 73 in (1,854 mm)
- Trailing dia.: 34 1/4 in (870 mm) and 48 in (1,219 mm)
- Minimum curve: 16°
- Length: 95 ft 1 1/4 in (28.99 m)
- Width: 10 ft 11 in (3.33 m)
- Height: 15 ft 7 in (4.75 m)
- Adhesive weight: 245,000 lb (111.1 metric tons)
- Loco weight: 403,000 lb (182.8 metric tons)
- Tender weight: 270,500 lb (122.7 metric tons)
- Fuel type: Coal
- Fuel capacity: 32,000 lb (14.5 metric tons)
- Water cap.: 14,300 US gal (54,000 L; 11,900 imp gal)
- Firebox
  - Grate area: 84.3 sq ft (7.83 m^{2})
- Boiler pressure: 250 psi (1,700 kPa)
- Heating surface
  - Firebox: 413 sq ft (38.4 m^{2})
  - Tubes: 3,989 sq ft (370.6 m^{2})
- Superheater
  - Type: Schmidt type E
  - Heating area: 1,955 sq ft (181.6 m^{2})
- Cylinders: Two, outside
- Cylinder size: 26 in × 30 in (660 mm × 762 mm)
- Valve gear: Walschaerts
- Valve type: 14-inch (356 mm) piston valves
- Valve travel: 7 1/2 in (191 mm)
- Train heating: Steam
- Loco brake: Air
- Train brakes: Air
- Couplers: Knuckle
Performance figures
- Tractive effort: 59,034 lbf (262.60 kN)
- Factor of adh.: 4.15
Career
- Operators: Grand Trunk Western Railroad; Ohio Central Railroad System
- Class: U-3-b
- Numbers: GTW 6325; OHCR 6325
- Nicknames: Old 6325
- Delivered: February 1942
- Retired: October 1959 (revenue service); 2005 (excursion service)
- Preserved: July 9, 1960
- Restored: July 31, 2001
- Current owner: Age of Steam Roundhouse
- Disposition: On static display

Grand Trunk Western 6325 ("Old 6325") is a preserved U-3-b class 4-8-4 "Northern" type steam locomotive, built in February 1942 by the American Locomotive Company (ALCO) for the Grand Trunk Western Railroad (GTW). As a member of the dual service U-3-b class, the No. 6325 handled heavy passenger and freight work for the Grand Trunk Western. In 1946, the No. 6325 gained notoriety for pulling United States President Harry S. Truman's election campaign train through the state of Michigan. Retired in 1959, the locomotive was donated for display to the City of Battle Creek, Michigan where a failed restoration attempt left No. 6325 in danger of being scrapped. Purchased in 1993 by Jerry Jacobson of the Ohio Central Railroad (OHCR), the locomotive sat in storage for six years until being restored to operating condition on July 31, 2001, for use on excursion trains across the Ohio Central System. The locomotive is in storage, on static display at the Age of Steam Roundhouse in Sugarcreek, Ohio.

== History ==
=== Revenue service ===
No. 6325 was built in February 1942 by ALCO along with 24 other U-3-b 4-8-4 "Northern" locomotive (sometimes called "Confederation" locomotives) numbered 6312 through 6336 as dual service locomotives that were the last new steam power assigned to the GTW. The U-3-b engines were right at home with GTW's road profile and characteristics, running almost a quarter of a million miles (400,000 km) between heavy repairs. No. 6325 could easily handle sixteen passenger cars or eighty car hotshot freights with equal ease on the Chicago division. Its forte was heavy passenger and fast freight service. All U-3-b class locomotives were known as good steamers and were liked by all engine crews and No. 6325 was no exception. On the GTW, it was the ultimate in modern steam power. In 1948, the locomotive pulled President Harry S. Truman's campaign train across Michigan on Grand Trunk rails.

=== Retirement ===
Because of its historical significance, when No. 6325 was retired in October 1959 and was donated to the City of Battle Creek, Michigan, for display. Its role in history is what saved it from the scrapper's torch. A fundraising campaign, led by the National Association of Power Engineers, promoted its preservation and cosmetic restoration. After a fresh paint job by the railroad, 6325 was stored until the city could finalize its plans for the display location. The city finalized plans for the locomotive's display location on Hall street across from the train station in May 1960. As site preparation began, some residents protested suggesting that the site was too small; ultimately, the chosen site was used. The locomotive was moved to its preservation site on July 9, 1960, and a dedication ceremony was held on July 17. (Note: President Truman was invited to attend the dedication ceremony but sent a letter expressing regrets that he could not attend. His letter was read publicly at the ceremony.)

A decade later, No. 6325 had sat in static display with very little maintenance. In 1985, fundraising began to restore the engine. The locomotive, the siding it sat on and the fence surrounding it were all sold for $1 to 6325 Turntable, Inc., a nonprofit organization founded to restore it. After moving it in October 1986 from its display location to a track at Franklin Iron & Metal Co., work soon began to restore the locomotive to operable status. In 1992 the small Michigan restoration group was notified by the GTW/Canadian National railroad that 6325 would have to be moved from its current siding. With little volunteers, low money and no place to call home, the Greater Battle Creek foundation was through.

=== Excursion service ===
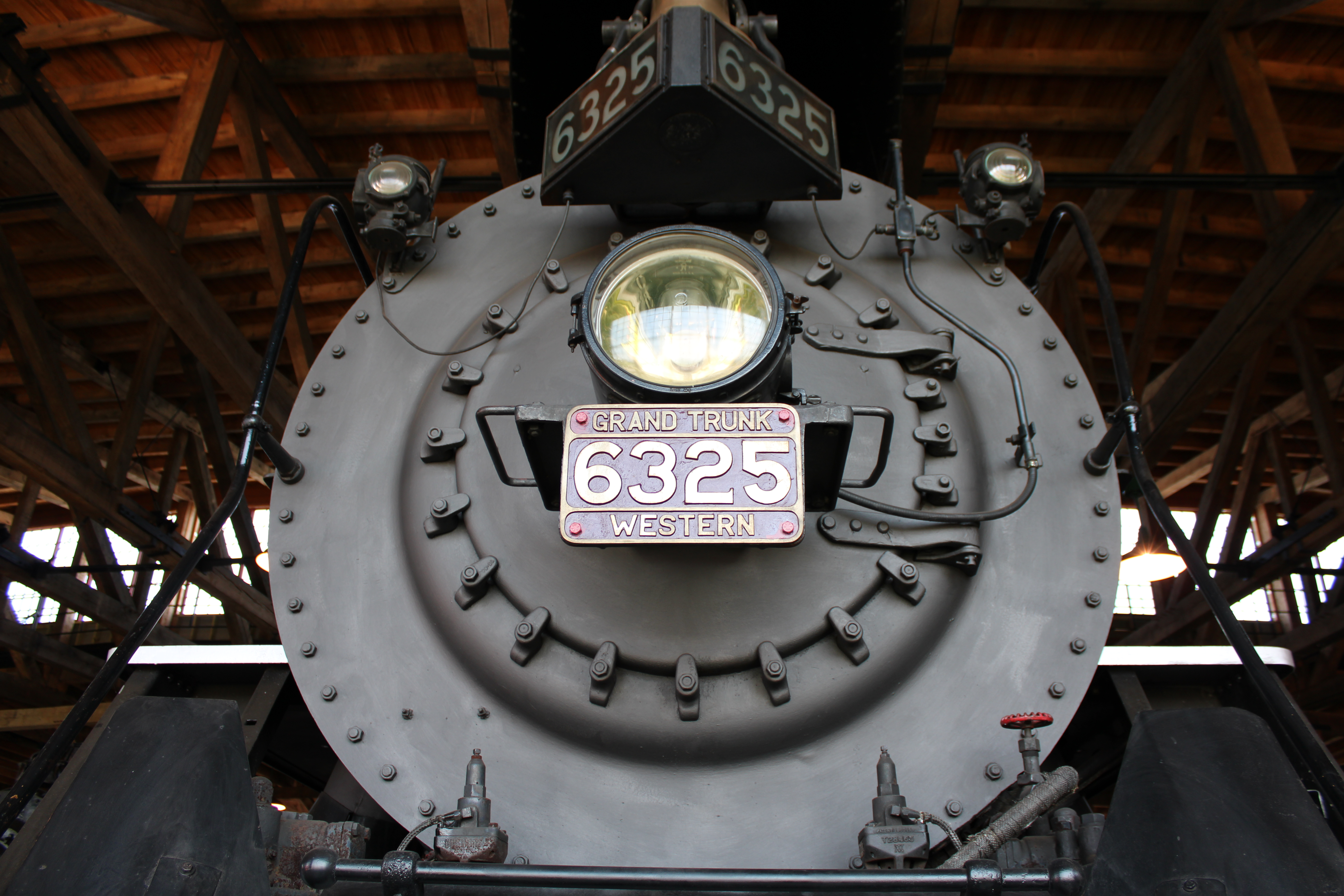
A close-up of No. 6325's headlight and numberplate

In stepped Jerry J. Jacobson of the Ohio Central Railroad System (OHCR) who purchased No. 6325 in 1993 and moved it to OHCR's steam shops at Morgan Run. But it wasn't until 1998 that restoration efforts began and on July 31, 2001, No. 6325 moved for the first time under its own power in forty-two years. It pulled its first excursion train from Dennison to Columbus, Ohio on September 22 of that year.

Some well known trips done by No. 6325 for example, were in 2002, where it pulled many regular trips as well as some photo festivals where it was coupled to a train and was run along Ohio Central's track at various places for photographs, runbys or just normal train chasing. The year 2003 was a spectacular year for 6325, it pulled a few excursions but that wasn't the main event of that year, it was a huge photo festival which included 20 side by side photo runs with No. 6325 pulling a freight, and Ohio Central's ex-Canadian Pacific Railway 1293 pulling a passenger train. The year 2004 saw a huge event in Ohio Central's steam operations when "Trainfestival 2004" took place from July 30 to August 1, 2004, in Dennison, Ohio. It was a major event featuring all of their steam locomotive, some historic diesel locomotives as well as rolling stock and many more rail-related activities. No. 6325 was the star of the show; first it was parked for display then it was coupled to the passenger train for several one-hour train rides throughout the day. Then at 5 pm, it pulled a special 3-hour excursion to the OHCR Morgan Run steam shops for tours. It was operated on this schedule for all three days of the event. However, in 2005, the engine was sidelined after it suffered a hot driving axle bearing issue during an excursion run, and it was taken out of service indefinitely, where it was previously awaiting a complete rebuild.

=== Disposition ===
Since its sidelining in 2005, No. 6325 hasn't been fired up due to Ohio Central's cease in steam train operations. Jacobson sold the Ohio Central to Genesee & Wyoming in 2008, retained his vintage locomotives and began construction on a large roundhouse, the Age of Steam Roundhouse, in Sugarcreek, Ohio, in order to house his collection. As of 2026, No. 6325 remains in the museum's collection. Since No. 6325's time under steam only lasted just over three years after its full restoration was completed in 2001, the museum has said that not as much work would be required to bring the locomotive back to operational condition. However, returning No. 6325 to steam is not a priority for the museum at this time.

== Notable sister engines ==
No. 6325 has one surviving sister engine, No. 6323, which is famous for being the last GTW steam engine to run on GTW rails, under GTW ownership. No. 6323 is on display at the Illinois Railway Museum in Union, Illinois.

No. 6322 was another well known sister engine, that is, for being the very last steam locomotive to be used by the GTW to pull a regularly scheduled passenger train. The train ran between Detroit to Durand during November 1960. The locomotive was retired by 1961, and was subsequently sold for scrap.

No. 6327 was, yet, another well known sister engine, No. 6327 is known for being the last steam engine to run in Port Huron, Michigan, as well as pulling the last steam train there. No. 6327 was among the last of GTW's steam engines still operating when the railroad dieselized in 1960 and it was scrapped that year.

== See also ==
- Canadian Pacific 2816
- Chesapeake and Ohio 614
- Grand Trunk Western 4070
- Grand Trunk Western 6039
- Nickel Plate Road 765
- Pere Marquette 1225
