= ČSD Class 477.0 =

Czechoslovak steam locomotive

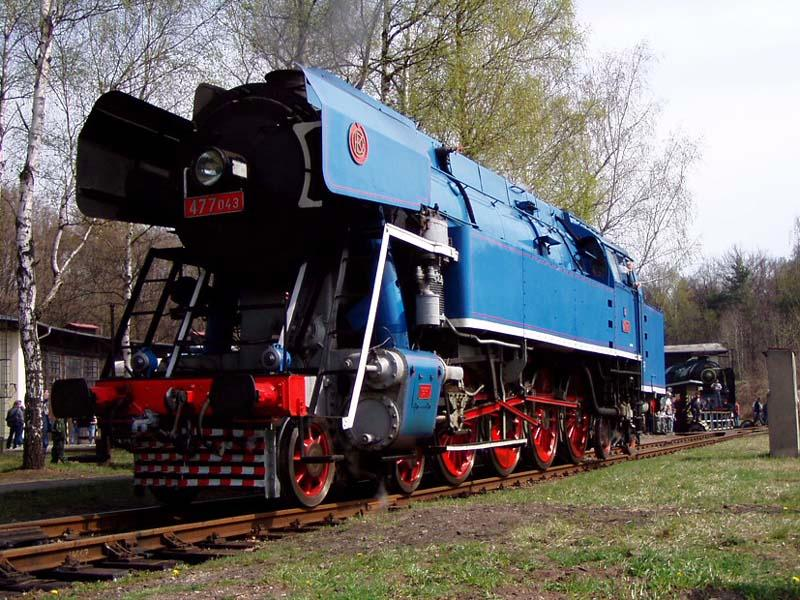
- 477.043 in Railway Museum Lužná u Rakovníka
Type and origin
- Power type: Steam
- Builder: ČKD
- Build date: 1951-1952 (38), 1955 (22)
Specifications
- Configuration
  - Whyte: 4-8-4T
- Gauge: 1,435 mm (4 ft 8 1/2 in) standard gauge
- Length
  - Over couplers: 17300 mm
- Width: 3050 mm
- Height: 4450 nn
- Service weight: 1,287 tonnes (1,267 long tons; 1,419 short tons)
- Fuel type: Coal
- RPM
  - Maximum RPM: 62.14 or 68.35 (during a stress test)
- Cylinders: Three
Performance figures
- Maximum speed: 100 or 110 km/h (62 or 68 mph)
Career
- Operators: ČSD
- Numbers: 477.001–477.060

ČSD Class 477.0 is the last type of steam locomotive made by ČKD for Czechoslovak State Railways. In total 60 tank locomotives with axle arrangement 2′D′ 2′ (4-8-4) were produced in 1951-1952 and 1955. It was a tank locomotive development of the ČSD Class 475.0 locomotive.

This locomotive has 3 pistons (two on the sides and one in the middle) with an approximate power of 1590 kW The first series (machines with serial numbers 001-006 and 008-036) had poor weight distribution on the tender and they had to be modified. The second series (machines with serial numbers 39-60) no longer had this defect and had more water in the tank on the sides.

Three are preserved, as of 2025 two of them were still operational (013 and 043).
