= Western Maryland J-1 Class =

Class of American 4-8-4 locomotives

Western Maryland J-1
Type and origin
- Power type: Steam
- Builder: Baldwin Locomotive Works
- Serial number: 73082-73093
- Build date: January 1947
- Total produced: 12
Specifications
- Configuration
  - Whyte: 4-8-4
  - UIC: 2′D2′ h2
- Gauge: 4 ft 8 1/2 in (1,435 mm) standard gauge
- Leading dia.: 36 in (914 mm)
- Driver dia.: 69 in (1,753 mm)
- Trailing dia.: 42 in (1,067 mm)
- Tender wheels: 36 in (914 mm)
- Minimum curve: 16°
- Length
  - Over couplers: 110 ft 2 in (33.58 m)
- Height: 16 ft 2 in (4.93 m)
- Axle load: 72,500 lb (36.3 short tons) for drivers
- Adhesive weight: 290,000 lb (145.0 short tons)
- Loco weight: 506,500 lb (253.3 short tons)
- Tender weight: 421,500 lb (210.8 short tons)
- Total weight: 928,000 lb (464.0 short tons)
- Fuel type: Coal
- Fuel capacity: 60,000 lb (30.0 short tons)
- Water cap.: 22,000 US gal (83,000 L; 18,000 imp gal)
- Firebox
  - Grate area: 106.7 sq ft (9.91 m^{2})
- Boiler: Firetube
- Boiler pressure: 255 lbf/in^{2} (1.76 MPa)
- Heating surface
  - Firebox: 573 sq ft (53.2 m^{2})
- Superheater
  - Heating area: 2,170 sq ft (202 m^{2})
- Cylinders: Two, outside
- Cylinder size: 26.5 in × 32 in (673 mm × 813 mm)
- Valve gear: Walschaerts
- Valve type: Piston valves
Performance figures
- Power output: 4,700 hp (3,500 kW) (Drawbar) @ 45 mph
- Tractive effort: 70,591 lbf (314.00 kN)
- Factor of adh.: 4.11
Career
- Operators: Western Maryland Railway
- Class: J-1
- Number in class: 12
- Numbers: 1401-1412
- Nicknames: Potomac
- Retired: By 1954
- Disposition: All original locomotives scrapped, One bell (1403) preserved

The Western Maryland J-1 class, also known as the Potomac, was a class of twelve 4-8-4 "Potomac" (Northern) type steam locomotives built by the Baldwin Locomotive Works in 1947. They were operated by the Western Maryland Railway (WM) in revenue service until the mid-1950s. Like most railroads, the WM did not choose the more common name "Northern", going with the name "Potomac" for their 4-8-4s instead.

They were built to haul freight on the WM mainline and all were retired by 1954.

== History ==
The Western Maryland Railway (WM) was the last North American railroad to adopt the 4-8-4 "Northern" type, and as a railroad that primarily ran within the Mid-Atlantic & largely the Southeastern United States, the WM chose to call their 4-8-4s "Potomacs", as named after the Potomac River. These new locomotives were the last new steam locomotives the WM purchased, and as such, they were very modern, efficient and powerful, as well as having relatively large boilers. They also held Timken roller bearings on every driver and tender axle and on the back end of the eccentric rod. All link motion pins used needle bearings. When running at forty-five miles per hour, the "Potomacs" had nearly the same performance as the larger M-2 class 4-6-6-4 "Challenger" types. On the 1.75% grade west out of Cumberland, Maryland, the Potomacs were limited 1,180 tons unassisted. On level trackage, they were capable of running upwards while pulling 5,500 tons, with an 8,000-ton limit for downhill journeys.

== Disposition ==
Due to coming when most railroads were starting to dieselize, the "Potomacs" did not have long careers, being in service for only seven years before being retired and put into storage in Hagerstown and Cumberland in 1954. They remained there until 1957, when the equipment trusts ran out and were subsequently scrapped. None of the J-1s have been preserved.
