= Cotton Belt Class L-1 =

Class of 4-8-4 "Northern" type steam locomotives

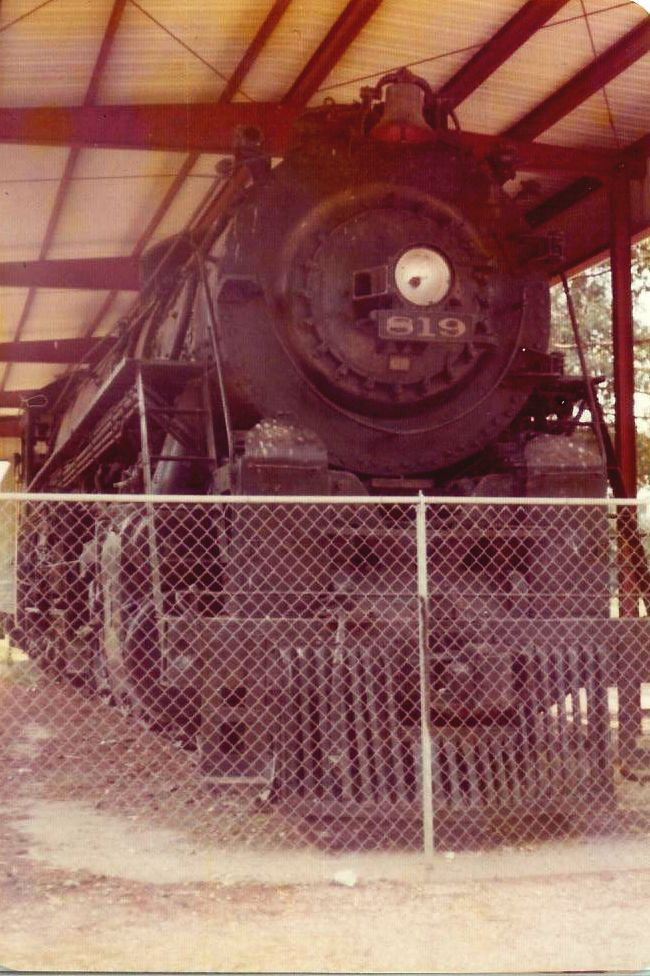
Type and origin
- Power type: Steam
- Builder: Baldwin Locomotive Works (10); SSW's Pine Bluff Shops (10)
- Build date: 1930, 1937, 1942–1943
- Total produced: 20
Specifications
- Configuration
  - Whyte: 4-8-4
  - UIC: 2′D2′ h2
- Gauge: 4 ft 8 1/2 in (1,435 mm)
- Driver dia.: 70 in (1,778 mm)
- Length: Total: 99 ft 8 1/2 in (30.39 m); Tender: 38 ft 9 in (11.81 m)
- Width: 10 ft 5 5/8 in (3.191 m)
- Height: 15 ft 10 in (4.826 m)
- Axle load: 62,000 lb (28.1 tonnes)
- Adhesive weight: 248,000 lb (112.5 tonnes)
- Loco weight: 438,500 lb (198.9 tonnes)
- Tender weight: 312,000 lb (141.5 tonnes)
- Total weight: 750,500 lb (340.4 tonnes)
- Fuel type: Oil
- Fuel capacity: 5,000 US gal (19,000 L; 4,200 imp gal)
- Water cap.: 15,000 US gal (57,000 L; 12,000 imp gal)
- Firebox
  - Grate area: 88.3 sq ft (8.20 m^{2})
- Boiler pressure: 250 lbf/in^{2} (1.72 MPa)
- Heating surface
  - Firebox: 469 sq ft (43.6 m^{2})
- Superheater
  - Heating area: 1,962 sq ft (182.3 m^{2})
- Cylinders: Two
- Cylinder size: 26 in × 30 in (660 mm × 762 mm)
- Valve gear: Walschaerts
- Valve type: Piston valves
- Loco brake: Air
- Train brakes: Air
- Couplers: Knuckle
Performance figures
- Tractive effort: 61,564 lbf (273.85 kN)
- Factor of adh.: 4.03
Career
- Operators: St. Louis Southwestern "Cotton Belt"; Southern Pacific Railroad
- Class: L-1
- Numbers: 800-819
- Retired: 1953
- Preserved: No. 819
- Scrapped: 1955-1957
- Disposition: One preserved, remainder scrapped

The Cotton Belt Class L-1 was a class of 20 4-8-4 "Northern" type steam locomotives that were built by the Baldwin Locomotive Works and the St. Louis Southwestern Railway (Cotton Belt) at their own Pine Bluff, Arkansas Shops.

== History ==
A total of 20 locomotives were ever built, with the first 10 locomotives being built by the Baldwin Locomotive Works in 1930 and being delivered to the St. Louis Southwestern Railway (Cotton Belt) that same year. The other 10 locomotives were built by the Cotton Belt's own Pine Bluff, Arkansas Shops in 1937, 1942 and 1943.

In 1953, the Cotton Belt began to retire each of their L-1 locomotives when they began to dieselize. All but one locomotive were scrapped from 1955 to 1957.

== Leasing with the Southern Pacific ==
During World War II, the Cotton Belt had made an agreement with Southern Pacific Railroad to lease eleven of their L-1 locomotives to operate on the lines by the Southern Pacific as they needed additional motive power to assist the wartime military traffic.

The leased L-1 locomotives were divided into two classes of locomotives on the Southern Pacific, those being their classes GS-7 and GS-8.

Neither of the two classes of leased L-1 locomotives were preserved, and they were all sold for scrap in 1957.

== Preservation ==
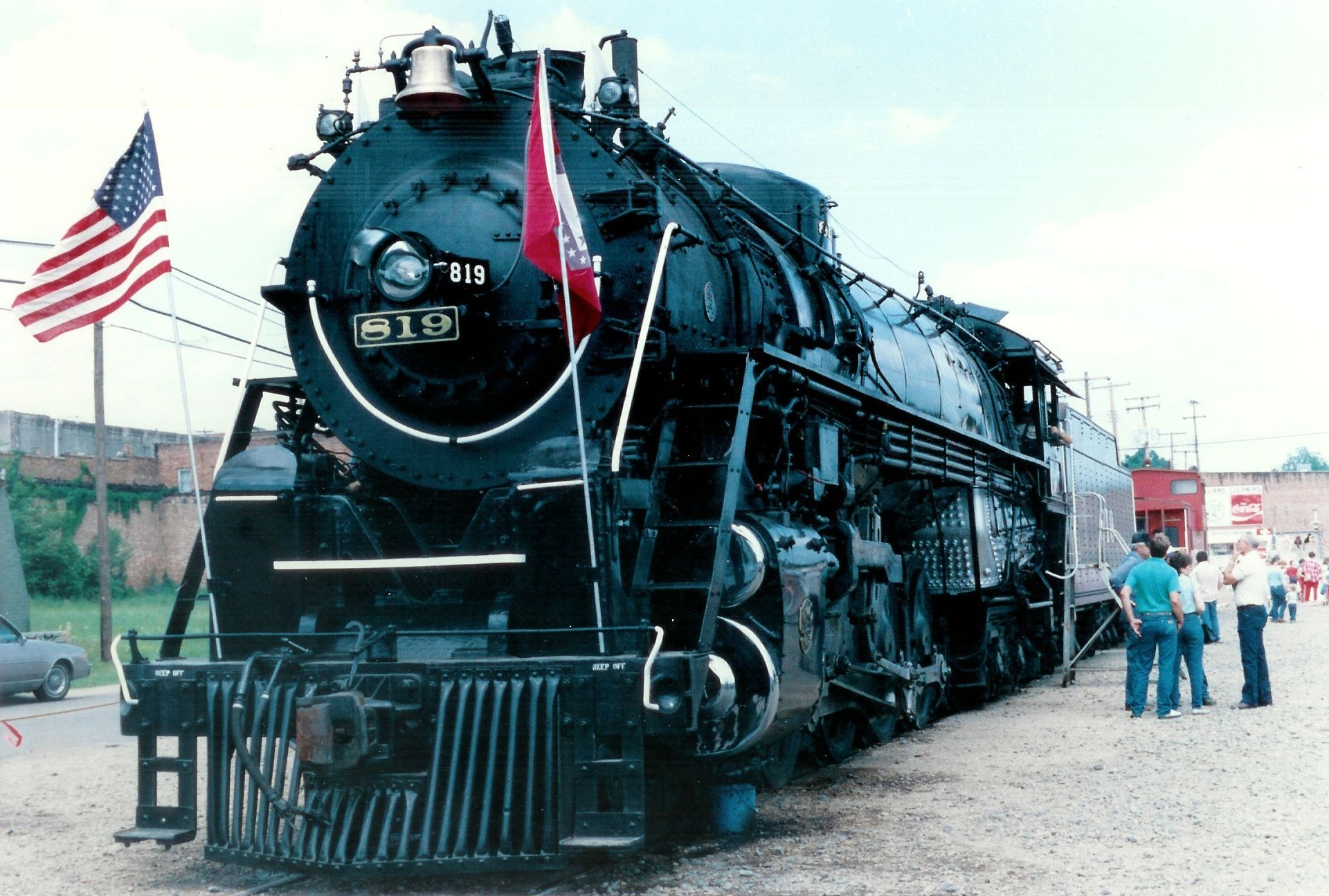
Cotton Belt 819 attending the Fordyce on the Cotton Belt Festival in 1986

Only one locomotive of the class L-1 has survived into preservation, which was No. 819. The locomotive was retired from revenue service in 1953 and was presented to the City of Pine Bluff, Arkansas in 1955 as a token of gratitude for the city's support of the Cotton Belt's steam locomotive operations. The ownership of the locomotive was retained by the city, and the restoration of the 819 was the responsibility of "Project 819", an all-volunteer effort by two rail historical preservation groups: the Arkansas Railroad Club and the Cotton Belt Rail Historical Society. The locomotive was restored to operating condition in 1986 and operated in excursion service until October 1993. As of 2022, the locomotive is being restored again at the Arkansas Railway Museum in Pine Bluff, Arkansas, by the Cotton Belt Rail Historical Society.
