= 4-8-4 =

Locomotive wheel arrangement

4-8-4 (Northern)

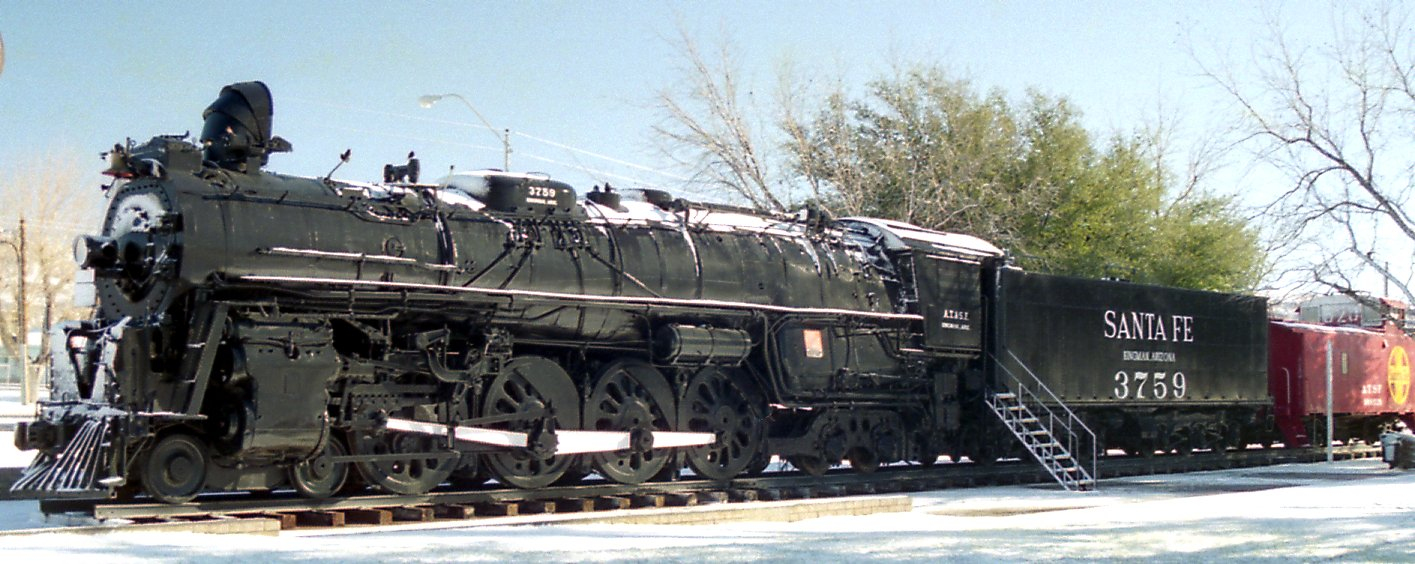
- Santa Fe No. 3759 on static display in Kingman, Arizona, US
Equivalent classifications
- UIC class: 2′D2′
- French class: 242
- Turkish class: 48
- Swiss class: 4/8
- Russian class: 2-4-2
First known tank engine version
- First use: 1912
- Country: Ireland
- Locomotive: Londonderry & Lough Swilly Railway Nos. 5 & 6
- Builder: Hudswell Clarke
- Benefits: Increased water/coal capacity
First known tender engine version
- First use: 1926
- Country: United States
- Locomotive: NP class A
- Railway: Northern Pacific Railway
- Designer: American Locomotive Company
- Builder: American Locomotive Company
- Evolved from: 4-8-2, 4-6-4 2-8-2
- Benefits: Deeper firebox and higher speed than 4-8-2 and 4-6-4

Under the Whyte notation for the classification of steam locomotives, 4-8-4 represents the wheel arrangement of four leading wheels on two axles, eight powered and coupled driving wheels on four axles and four trailing wheels on two axles. The type was first used by the Northern Pacific Railway, and initially named the Northern Pacific, but railfans and railroad employees have shortened the name. It is most commonly known as a Northern, among various other names.

== Overview ==
=== Development ===
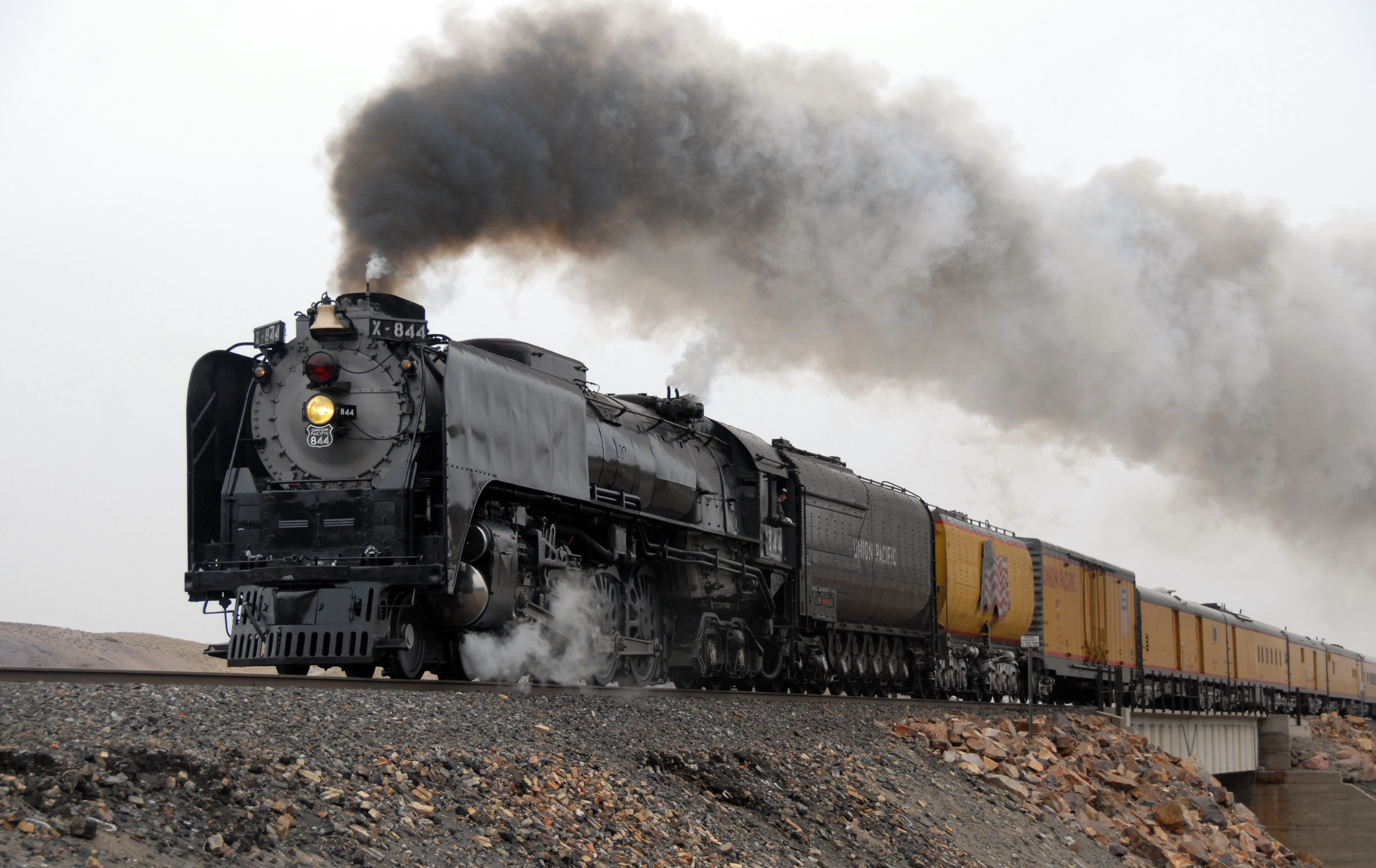
Union Pacific 844, the only steam locomotive never retired by a North American Class I railroad

The 4-8-4 wheel arrangement was a progression from the 4-8-2 Mountain type and, like the 2-8-4 Berkshire and 4-6-4 Hudson types, an example of the "Super Power" concept in steam locomotive design that made use of the larger firebox that could be supported by a four-wheel trailing truck, which allowed greater production of steam. The four-wheel leading truck gave stability at speed and the eight driving wheels gave greater adhesion. The 4-8-4 type evolved in the United States soon after the Lima Locomotive Works introduced the concept of "Lima Super Power" in 1925, making heavy 2-8-2 and 2-8-4 locomotives. The prototype was built by American Locomotive Company (ALCO) for the Northern Pacific Railway (NP) in 1926, with a very large firebox with a 100-square-foot (9.3 m^{2}) grate, designed to burn low quality lignite coal. The four-wheel trailing truck weighed about 15,000 pounds (6.8 t) more than two-wheel trucks of the time and could carry an additional 55,000 pounds (25 t) of engine weight; the difference of 40,000 pounds (18 t) was available for increased boiler capacity.

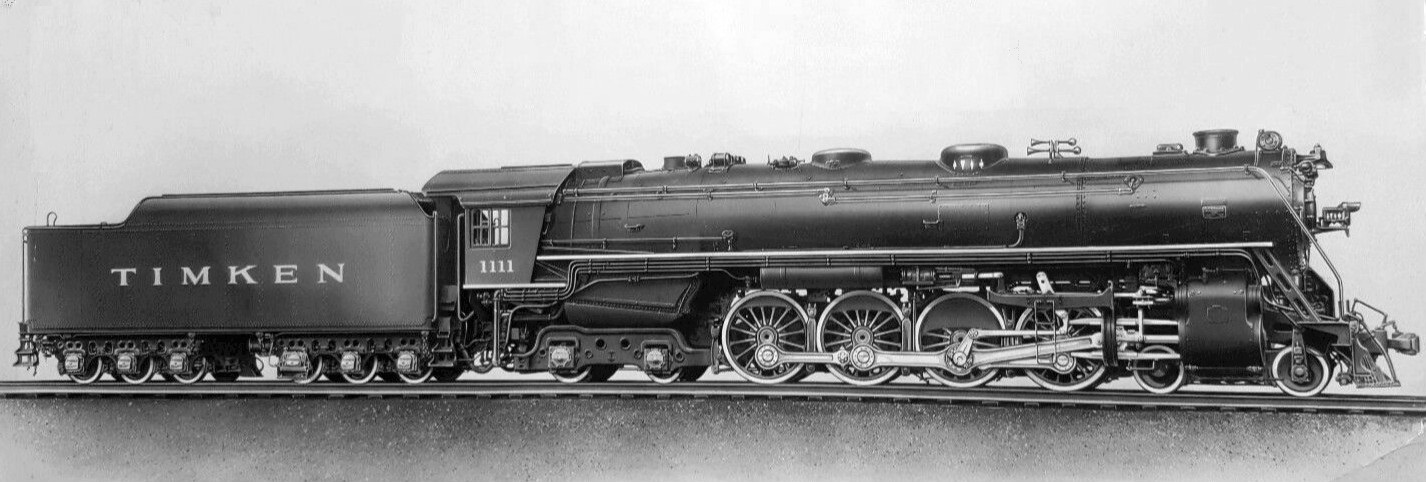
Roller-bearing equipped Timken 1111

The 4-8-4 type arrived when nearly all the important steam locomotive design improvements had already been proven, including superheaters, mechanical stokers, outside valve gear and the Delta trailing truck. One-piece, cast steel bed-frames with integrally cast cylinders gave the strength and rigidity to use Roller bearings. In 1930, the Timken Company used the Timken 1111, a 4-8-4 built by ALCO with roller bearings on all axles, to demonstrate the value of their sealed roller bearings. That locomotive was subsequently sold to the NP, where it became NP No. 2626, their sole Class A-1 locomotive.

The stability of the 4-8-4 wheel arrangement meant that driving wheels up to 80 inches (2.0 m) diameter could be used for high speed passenger and fast freight operation. Lateral control devices allowed these locomotives to traverse relatively sharp curves despite their eight-coupled drivers. The increased boiler size possible with this type, together with the high axle loads permitted on mainlines in North America, resulted in the design of some massive locomotives, some of which weighed as much as 450 tons, including the tender. The 4-8-4 was suitable for both express passenger and fast freight service, though it was not suited to heavy drag freight trains.

Although locomotives of the 4-8-4 wheel arrangement were used in a number of countries, those that were developed outside North America included various design features which set them apart from North American practice. Scaled down examples of the type were exported by two American builders, ALCO and Baldwin Locomotive Works, for 1,000 mm (3 ft 3 3/8 in) metre gauge lines in Brazil. Most were two-cylinder locomotives, but five classes of three-cylinder 4-8-4s were built:

- The simplex 06 class by the Deutsche Reichsbahn in Germany.
- The simplex H class by the Victorian Railways in Australia.
- The compound 242A1 class of the Société nationale des chemins de fer français (SNCF) in France.
- The simplex 477 class tank engines by CKD for Czechoslovak State Railways; 60 4-8-4T locomotives were built between 1951 and 1955, the last new steam engines built in Czechoslovakia.
- An experimental high-pressure compound locomotive of the New York Central (NYC).

=== The Northern name ===
Since the 4-8-4 was first used by the Northern Pacific Railway, the type was named "Northern Pacific", which was elided to "Northern". Most North American railroads used this name, but some adopted different names.

- "Heavy Mountain" or "New Mountain" on the Atchison, Topeka, and Santa Fe (ATSF). Original blueprints of class 3751 designate the 4-8-4 as a "Mountain" or "Heavy Mountain". The index to the blueprints reference the 3751 class as "Mountain, 4-Wheel Trailer". Early correspondence of the ATSF refer to this type as "New Mountains". The Santa Fe never adopted the "Northern" designation.
- "Big Apple" on the Central of Georgia Railway (CG).
- "Confederation" on the Canadian National Railway (CN), named because they were purchased in 1927, the 60th anniversary of Canada's confederation in 1867. The "Confederation" 4-8-4s were later renamed by the CN to the generic "Northern" name in later years.
- "Dixie" on the Nashville, Chattanooga and St. Louis Railway (NC&StL).
- "Golden State" on the Southern Pacific Railroad (SP), temporarily renamed "General Service" during the Second World War and also referred to as "GS" by Western Pacific for those GSs which were diverted to the WP from SP's order by the War Production Board.
- "Greenbrier" on the Chesapeake and Ohio Railway (C&O).
- "J" on the Norfolk and Western Railway (N&W).
- "FEF" (Four-Eight-Four) on the Union Pacific Railroad (UP).
- "Niagara" on the New York Central Railroad (NYC).
- "Niágara" on the Ferrocarriles Nacionales de México (N de M) and in Brazil.
- "Pocono" on the Delaware, Lackawanna and Western Railroad (Lackawanna).
- "Potomac" on the Western Maryland Railway (WM).
- "Wyoming" on the Lehigh Valley Railroad (LV).

The Richmond, Fredericksburg and Potomac Railroad (RFP) gave each of its three 4-8-4 classes a separate name, the "General" of 1937, the "Governor" of 1938 and the "Statesman" of 1944.

=== Demise ===
The big-wheeled 4-8-4 was at home on heavy passenger trains and quite capable of speeds over 100 miles per hour (160 kilometres per hour), but freight was the primary revenue source of the railroads; in that service the Northern had limitations. The adhesive weight on a 4-8-4 was limited to about 60% of the engine's weight, not including the dead weight of the tender. Henry Bowen, the Chief Mechanical Engineer of the Canadian Pacific Railway (CPR) from 1928 to 1949, tested the first two CPR K-1a Northerns introduced by his predecessor, then he designed a 2-10-4 Selkirk type using the same boiler. The resulting T-1a Selkirk locomotive had the same number of axles as the Northern, but the driving wheels were reduced from 75 to 63 inches (1.9–1.6 m) in diameter, while the additional pair of driving wheels increased the tractive effort by 27%. In a later variant, Bowen added a booster to the trailing truck, enabling the Selkirk to exert nearly 50% more tractive effort than the similar-sized K-1a Northern.

When it was demonstrated that a three-unit EMD F3 diesel-electric consist that weighed slightly less than the total engine and tender mass of a CPR K-1a Northern could produce nearly three times its tractive effort, high-powered steam locomotives were retired as quickly as finance allowed.

== Usage ==
=== Australia ===
A total of twenty-three 4-8-4 locomotives operated in Australia, built to three distinct designs.

In 1929, the ten 5 ft 3 in (1,600 mm) gauge South Australian Railways 500 class 4-8-2 Mountain types of 1926 were equipped with steam boosters in the form of small auxiliary steam engines to increase their power. This necessitated the replacement of their two-wheel trailing trucks with four-wheel bogies. The booster contributed an additional 8,000 pounds-force (36 kilonewtons) to the tractive effort and permitted an increase in the locomotive's load across the Mount Lofty Ranges to 540 tons. In their new 4-8-4 configuration, they were reclassified to 500B class.

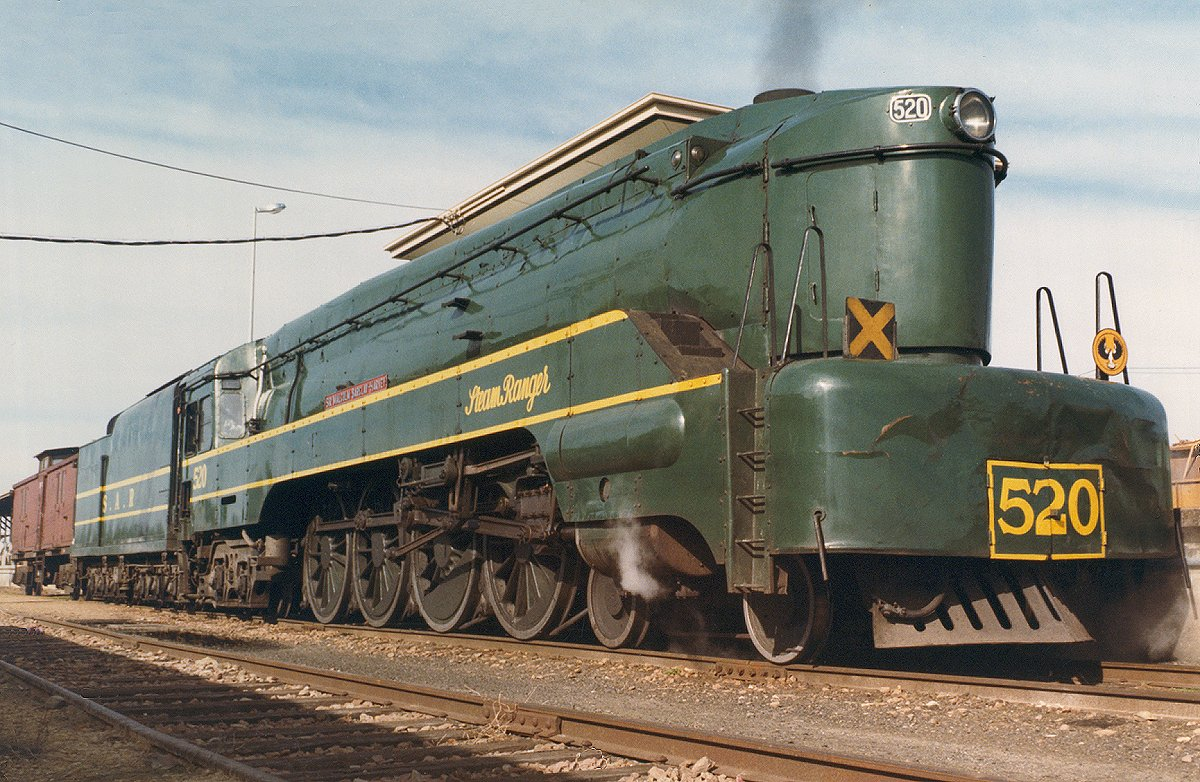
South Australian Railways 520 class

In 1943, the first of twelve streamlined South Australian Railways 520 class locomotives were delivered from the Islington Workshops in Adelaide. Although they were large locomotives, they were designed to run on lightly constructed 60-pound-per-yard (30 kg/m) track, with the engine's weight being spread over eight axles. Their 66-inch-diameter (1,676 mm) coupled wheels were specially balanced for 70-mile-per-hour (110 km/h) running.

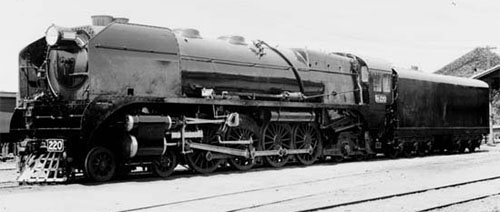
Victorian Railways H220 Heavy Harry

The H class three-cylinder 4-8-4 of the Victorian Railways, built in 1941, was designed for heavy passenger work on the line between Melbourne and Adelaide. Nicknamed Heavy Harry, it was the largest steam locomotive built in Australia and, after the NSWGR D57 4-8-2 and the South Australian Railways 500/500B class, the third-most-powerful non-articulated locomotive. It was one of the five Australian classes of three-cylinder 4-8-4 locomotives.

Construction of three locomotives commenced at the Newport Workshops in 1939 and three sets of frames were manufactured. Although work was halted due to the outbreak of the Second World War, a shortage of motive power caused by increased wartime traffic resulted in authorisation being given for the completion of class leader H220. The locomotive went into service on 7 February 1941, but remained the sole member of the class because the other two partly built locomotives were never completed. Since the necessary upgrades to the Adelaide line was deferred, H220 operated only on the line between Melbourne and Albury in New South Wales.

=== Brazil ===
To meet the acute locomotive shortages in Brazil after the Second World War, 27 scaled down American 4-8-4 Niágara locomotives were ordered by the Brazilian Departamento Nacional de Estradas de Ferro (DNEF) from ALCO in 1946. These locomotives were supplied to the Viação Férrea do Rio Grande do Sul (VFRGS), which then purchased another fifteen directly from ALCO in 1947. They were designated the 1001 class. In 1956 and 1957, some of them were sold to Bolivia. The Baldwin Locomotive Works supplied similar 1,000 mm (3 ft 3 3/8 in) metre gauge 4-8-4 locomotives to the Rede Mineira de Viação (RMV Nos. 601 to 604), the Rede de Viação Paraná-Santa Catarina (RVPSC Nos. 801 to 806) and the Noroeste do Brasil (NOB Nos. 621 to 623).

After his retirement from the Société nationale des chemins de fer français (SNCF) in France, French engineer André Chapelon was appointed as the chief designer of 1,000 mm (3 ft 3 3/8 in) metre gauge 4-8-4 locomotives at the French state-owned sales consortium Groupement d'exportation de locomotives en Sud-Amérique (GELSA). In 1949, a contract was signed between DNEF and GELSA for the construction of 24 4-8-4 locomotives with a 13 tonnes (12.8 long tons; 14.3 short tons) axle load. The order also included 66 2-8-4 Berkshires. All ninety locomotives were delivered by January 1953.

The 24 class 242F Niágara locomotives were built by Société de Construction des Batignolles (Batignolles-Châtillon). They were two-cylinder simple expansion locomotives, designed to burn poor quality local coal with a low calorific thermal value, with coupled wheels of 60 inches (1,524 millimetres) diameter and a grate area of 58 square feet (5.4 square metres). They were coupled to big tenders which a coal capacity of 18 tonnes (17.7 long tons; 19.8 short tons). The Belpaire firebox included a combustion chamber and the boiler pressure was a high 18 standard atmospheres (1,800 kilopascals; 260 pounds per square inch). One member of the class was tested on the 1,000 mm (3 ft 3 3/8 in) metre gauge Reseau Breton line in France before being shipped to Brazil.

The DNEF allocated the locomotives to four of Brazil's state railways. Under Brazilian railway conditions, these modern locomotives were not popular with local railwaymen and were not used as much as had been hoped. Their maximum axle load of 13 tonnes (12.8 long tons; 14.3 short tons) restricted their usefulness, as did their long tenders. In some places the turntables were too short to turn the locomotives and they had to be turned on triangles. In addition, the building specifications had called for a locomotive capable of a maximum speed of 80 kilometres per hour (50 miles per hour) and the ability to negotiate curves with a minimum radius of 80 metres (260 feet). This last point proved to be a source of contention when it was later discovered that the curves in some places were of less than 50 metres (160 feet) radius. As a consequence, the locomotives were involved in a number of derailments.

In the late 1960s, they were relegated down from first class passenger trains. Some locomotives, allocated to Southern Brazil, were also tried in Bolivia.

=== Canada ===
Since the Canadian mainlines were generally laid with 115-pound-per-yard (57 kg/m) rail, Canadian 4-8-4s were heavy and weighed in with axle loads up to 31.3 short tons (28.4 t).

When the Canadian National Railway (CN) introduced its first 4-8-4 in 1927, it used the name "Confederation" for the type, to celebrate the 60th anniversary of Canadian Confederation. The CN employed a total of 160 Confederation locomotives.

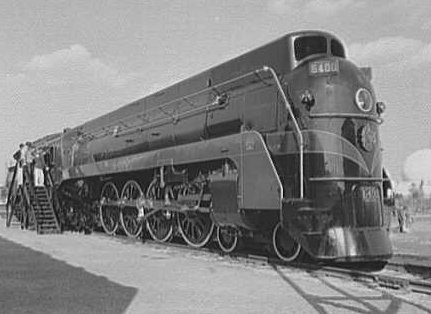
A Canadian National Railway U-4-a, a streamlined 4-8-4 of which one, Canadian National 6400, is preserved. The other 7 preserved examples are non streamlined.

- Altogether forty locomotives were delivered in 1927, twenty Class U-2-a from the Canadian Locomotive Company and twenty Class U-2-b from the Montreal Locomotive Works (MLW).
- Another twenty Class U-2-c came from MLW in 1929 and another five Class U-2-d, also from MLW, in 1936.
- The CN U-4a was one of the few streamlined Confederation types, with five locomotives built by MLW and also introduced in 1936. U-4a No. 6400 achieved fame in 1939 by heading the royal train (see 1939 royal tour of Canada) and being exhibited at the New York World's Fair in the same year.
- Between 1940 and 1944, a total of ninety more Confederation locomotives, built in four batches, were added to the CN roster.

The Canadian Pacific Railway (CPR) experimented with the 4-8-4 wheel arrangement in 1928, when two K-1a class locomotives were built in its Angus shops in Montreal, the first locomotives to be built with a one-piece cast-steel frame in Canada. However, since the CPR mainlines were built to high standards, the railway preferred to develop the 4-6-4 Hudson type for passenger work since it gave adequate power and was cheaper to maintain, while a ten-coupled type, the 2-10-4 Selkirk, was adopted for heavy-duty work. Nevertheless, although the two CPR Northerns remained orphans, they proved their worth continuously for 25 years on overnight passenger trains between Windsor Station (Montreal) and Union Station (Toronto). Before their retirement in 1960, they were converted to oil-burners and worked freight trains in the prairie provinces.

=== Chile ===
In 1936, the German builder Henschel & Son supplied ten 5 ft 6 in (1,676 mm) gauge 4-8-4 locomotives to the Ferrocarriles del Estado (State Railways or FdE) of Chile, designated the Tipo 100. They were called Super Montañas (Super Mountains), since they followed the Tipo 80 4-8-2 Mountain that was introduced six years earlier. They were equipped with mechanical stokers and Vanderbilt tenders and weighed 185 tonnes in working order. On test, they produced 2,355 indicated horsepower (1,756 kilowatts) at a coal consumption of 34 kilograms per kilometre (120 pounds per mile) and a water consumption of 274 litres (60 imperial gallons; 72 US gallons) per kilometre. The design was not repeated, however, and the FdE returned to the 4-8-2 wheel arrangement with its subsequent acquisitions. The Tipo 100 was used on the line from Almeda to Talca until it was replaced by diesels in 1969. One of them, No. 1009, is preserved in the Santiago Railway Museum.

=== China ===
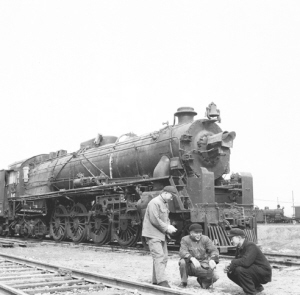
China Railway KF Class

In 1933, the Beijing–Hankou Railway in China needed new locomotives for their Guangzhou to Shaoguan line, where gradients of around two percent, curves with less than 250 metres (820 feet) radius and low capacity bridges existed. The requirement was therefore for a locomotive with high tractive effort and a low axle load. In 1935 and 1936, 24 600-series 4-8-4 locomotives, designed and built in the United Kingdom by Vulcan Foundry, were delivered to the railway. The locomotives represented a significant improvement over previous designs and incorporated a more efficient E-type superheater and duplex steam valve to allow better steaming without enlarging the boiler, while the 4-8-4 wheel arrangement allowed better weight distribution.

When the Changsha–Guangzhou Railway was completed in October 1936, the locomotives were transferred to operate over the northern section between Hankou and Changsha on this new mainline, which connected Guangzhou with Tianjin and Beijing.

Following the establishment of the People's Republic of China, the locomotives were designated the China Railways KF class. Some of the locomotives survived in service until the early 1970s. One of them, No. 607, is preserved at the National Railway Museum in the United Kingdom and another is in China at the Beijing Railway Museum.

=== Czechoslovakia ===
The 60 4-8-4T tank engines of Czechoslovak State Railways' 477 class represent the ultimate development of the CKD 4-8-2 tender locomotive, but added a four-wheel trailing truck as part of the conversion to a tank locomotive. One of five classes of three cylinder 4-8-4 locomotives known, they were the last steam locomotives delivered to the Czechoslovak State Railways, with the last group built in 1955. Used primarily in local passenger service, they were pulling regularly timetabled trains as late as 1981.

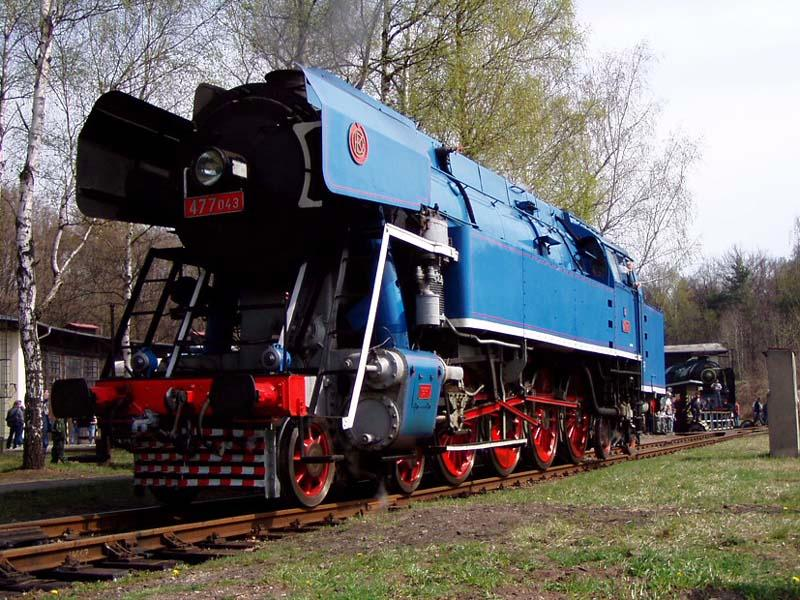
CSD 477.043 in the České dráhy Museum

Three are preserved, as of 2018 two of them were still operational (013 and 043).

=== France ===
The lone prototype, numbered 242A1, of the Société Nationale des Chemins de fer Français (SNCF) was one of the five known classes of three-cylinder 4-8-4 locomotives. It also had the distinction, along with an experimental high pressure locomotive of the New York Central Railroad in the United States, of being one of the two compound 4-8-4s. It was rebuilt by Andre Chapelon from the unsuccessful 1932 three-cylinder 4-8-2 simple expansion locomotive No. 241.101 of the Chemins de Fer de l'État into a 4-8-4 compound locomotive. This remarkable locomotive achieved extraordinary power outputs and efficiency in coal and water consumption, but no further examples were built since the SNCF focused on electric traction for its future motive power development.

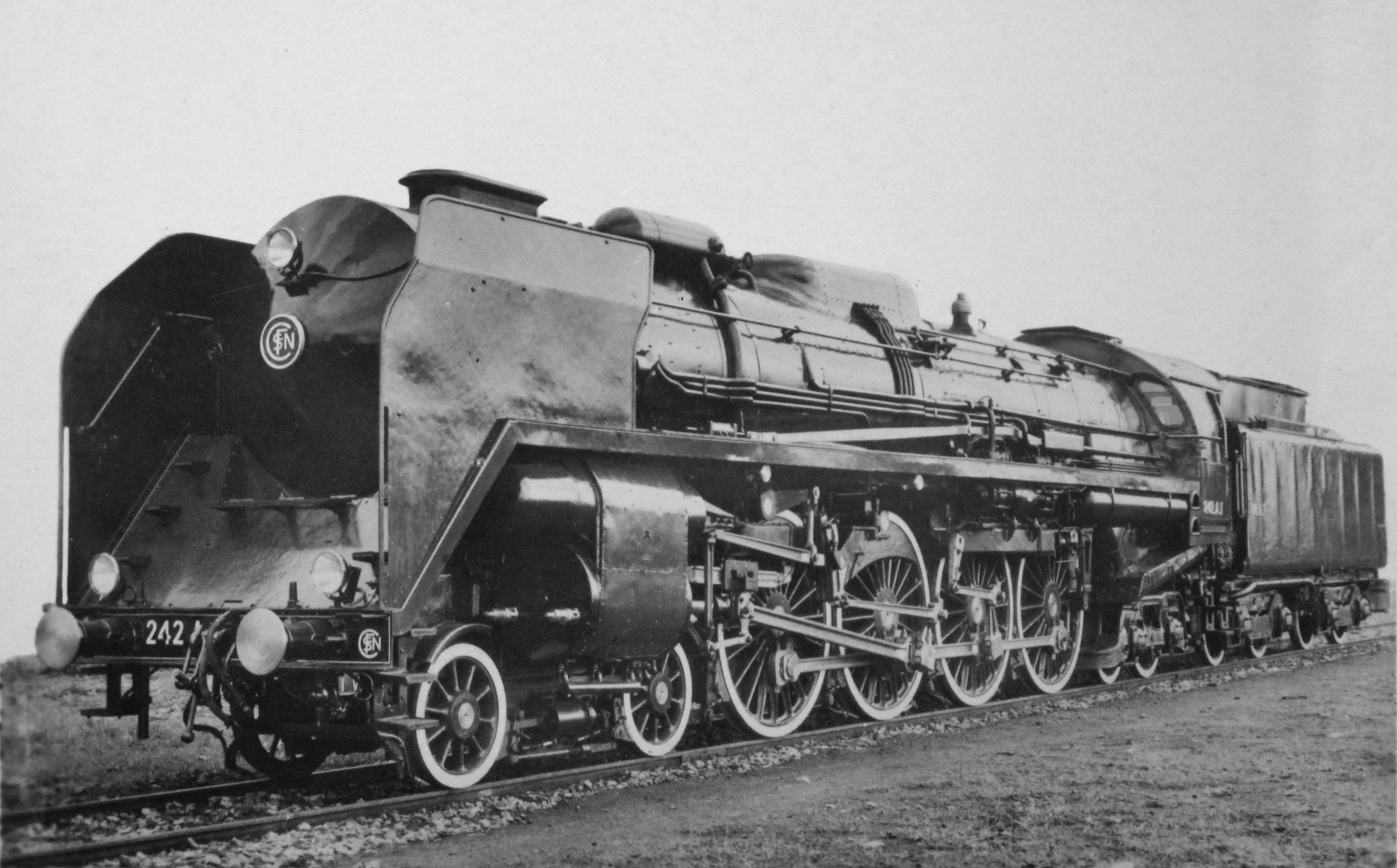
SNCF No. 242A1

No. 242A1 was put through trials on many test runs which showed that this locomotive was equal in power output to the existing SNCF electric locomotives at the time. Here, for the first time in Europe, was a steam locomotive with a 20 tonnes (19.7 long tons; 22.0 short tons) axle load which was not only at least as powerful as the most powerful existing high-speed electric locomotive, but which could repeatedly achieve its maximum power without any mechanical trouble. Developing 5,300 indicated horsepower (4,000 kilowatts) and with 65,679 pounds-force (292 kilonewtons) of peak tractive effort and 46,225 pounds-force (206 kilonewtons) of mean tractive effort; nothing in Europe could match it.

While No. 242A1 was being tested, electrical engineers were designing the locomotives for the 512-kilometre-long (318-mile) line between Paris and Lyon, which was to be electrified. An electric locomotive that was to be slightly more powerful than the successful Paris to Orléans 2-D-2 type electric locomotive was being contemplated. When the test results of No. 242A1 became known, however, the design was hurriedly changed to incorporate the maximum capacity possible with a 23 tonnes (22.6 long tons; 25.4 short tons) axle load, resulting in the 144 tonnes (141.7 long tons; 158.7 short tons) 9100 class with a power output of more than 1,000 horsepower (750 kilowatts) more than that of the original design.

The performances of the Mistral and other heavy passenger express trains would therefore not have been so outstanding if No. 242A1 had not existed and Andre Chapelon therefore indirectly influenced French electric locomotive design. In addition, No. 242A1 demonstrated the suitability of the Sauvage-Smith system of compounding for French conditions and the designs for future French steam locomotives that were prepared but never produced, were to make use of the Sauvage-Smith compounding system.

In service, No. 242A1 was allocated to the Le Mans depot and, between 1950 and 1960, it hauled express trains over the 411 kilometres (255 miles) between Le Mans and Brest. It did not remain in service long, however, and was withdrawn and scrapped in 1960.

The PLM built its 242.AT.1 to 120 class tank engines from 1926 to 1929; however, they were all retired by the 1960s. This did not stop one engine, 242.AT.6, from being preserved at the Cité du Train, thus becoming the only preserved French 4-8-4, and the largest preserved tank engine in France.

=== Germany ===
In 1939, the Deutsche Reichsbahn placed two prototype three-cylinder DRB Class 06 2D2-h3 heavy express locomotives in service, built by Krupp in 1938. Along with the lone 242A1 of the Société Nationale des Chemins de fer Français (SNCF) and the lone Victorian Railways H class in Australia, it was one of the five known classes of three-cylinder 4-8-4 locomotives. Due to the outbreak of the Second World War and construction problems, only the two locomotives were produced.

With three 520-by-720-millimetre (20.47 by 28.35 in) cylinders, large 2,000-millimetre (78.74 in) diameter coupled wheels, a high 280-pound-per-square-inch (1,900 kPa) boiler pressure and 55,800 pounds-force (248 kilonewtons) of tractive effort, they were capable of a maximum speed of 140 kilometres per hour (87 miles per hour) and could haul a 650-tonne train at 120 kilometres per hour (75 miles per hour). Many parts, such as the boiler, were standardised with that of the DRG Class 45 heavy freight locomotive. The streamlined Class 06, the only German 4-8-4, was the biggest steam locomotive ever built in Germany. The two locomotives were shedded in Frankfurt and were placed in service on the line to Erfurt. No. 06.002 was bombed and destroyed during the hostilities and No. 06.001 survived until 1951, when it was retired and scrapped.

The boiler of both the 06 and 45 were designed along the lines of Robert Garbe and Richard Paul "Kunibald" Wagner, who held that a combustion chamber or double-expansion compound steam engines were unnecessary when using superheated steam. While the DB railways in the FRG salvaged the Class 45 design by fitting it with a badly needed mechanical stoker, there was no need for the powerful Class 06 Express locos; when express traffic resumed, DB Class V 200 and DB Class E 10 Diesel-hydraulic and AC electric engines made any investment into pre-World War II steam engines unacceptable for the DB leadership even though Friedrich Witte or Adolph Giesl-Gieslingen proposed many improvements.

=== Mexico ===
In 1946, the Ferrocarriles Nacionales de México (N de M) placed orders with American Locomotive Company and Baldwin Locomotive Works for sixty Niágara locomotives for use on its principal express passenger services on upgraded lines, but the order was reduced to 32 in favour of diesel-electric locomotives. These QR-1 class locomotives were used mainly on lines north of Mexico City and were nicknamed La Maquina. All were taken out of service in the late 1960s. Most survived and No. 3028, although not in operating condition, was stored on the deadline at the New Hope and Ivyland Railroad in New Hope, Pennsylvania.

=== New Zealand ===
New Zealand adopted the narrow 3 ft 6 in (1,067 mm) gauge to minimise railway construction costs and, due to the mountainous terrain, the loading gauge was restricted to a maximum height of 11 feet 6 inches (3.51 metres) and width of 8 feet 6 inches (2.59 metres), making it one of the most restrictive loading gauges in the world. While this undoubtedly reduced the cost of building the two hundred-odd tunnels on the railway system, it posed major problems for locomotive designers which were exacerbated by an axle load limit of 14 long tons (15.7 short tons; 14.2 tonnes).

After the Soviet Union and South Africa, the New Zealand Railways Department (NZR) had the largest fleet of 4-8-4 locomotives outside North America, with 71 similar locomotives in the K class, K^{A} class and K^{B} class.

The K class was designed by R.J. Gard to the requirements of Locomotive Superintendent P.R. Angus and was built locally at the Hutt Workshops of the NZR. The first locomotives were delivered during the depths of the Great Depression in 1932. The 47 square feet (4.4 square metres) grate and comparatively large boiler was slung low on a narrow frame to keep within the height restrictions, and width restrictions were adhered to with sloped cab sides and the mounting of two single stage air compressors in front of the smokebox.

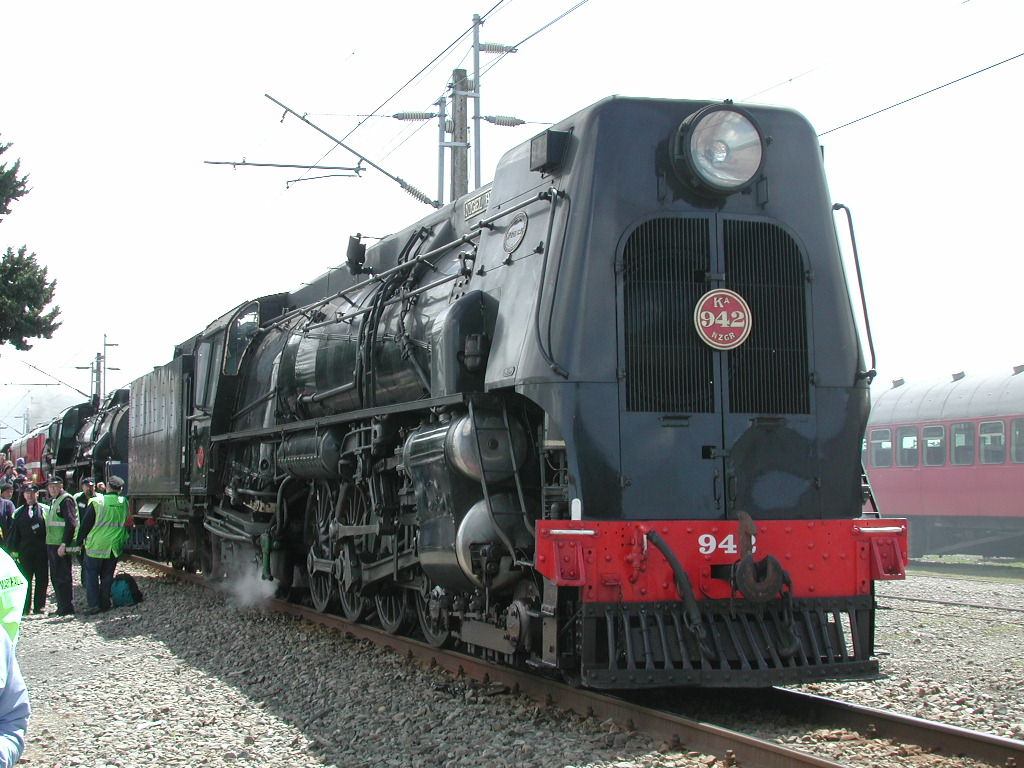
NZR K^{A} class No. 942

After the construction of 30 K class locomotives, the NZR developed the design to strengthen the frame and introduced other improvements, such as roller bearings on all axles and ACFI (Accessoires pour les Chemins de Fer et l'Industrie) feedwater heaters. Introduced from 1939, they were also built in NZR workshops, most of them with streamlined shrouding to cover the external pipe work of their feedwater heater systems. The first 35 locomotives were designated K^{A} class and worked on the North Island Main Trunk lines with the older K class locomotives.

6 more locomotives were built, designated K^{B} class, for service on the steeply graded Midland Line on the South Island of New Zealand. These locomotives were equipped with trailing truck boosters, which raised their tractive effort by 6,000 pounds-force (27,000 newtons).

On occasion, these 4-8-4s recorded speeds up to 75 miles per hour (121 kilometres per hour). The streamlining shrouds of the K^{A} and K^{B} classes were removed in the late 1940s when the ACFI feedwater heaters were replaced with exhaust steam injectors. The last of these locomotives was withdrawn from service in 1968 due to dieselisation. Seven had been preserved, K class numbers 900, 911 and 917, K^{A} class numbers 935, 942 and 945 and K^{B} class No. 968.

=== South Africa ===
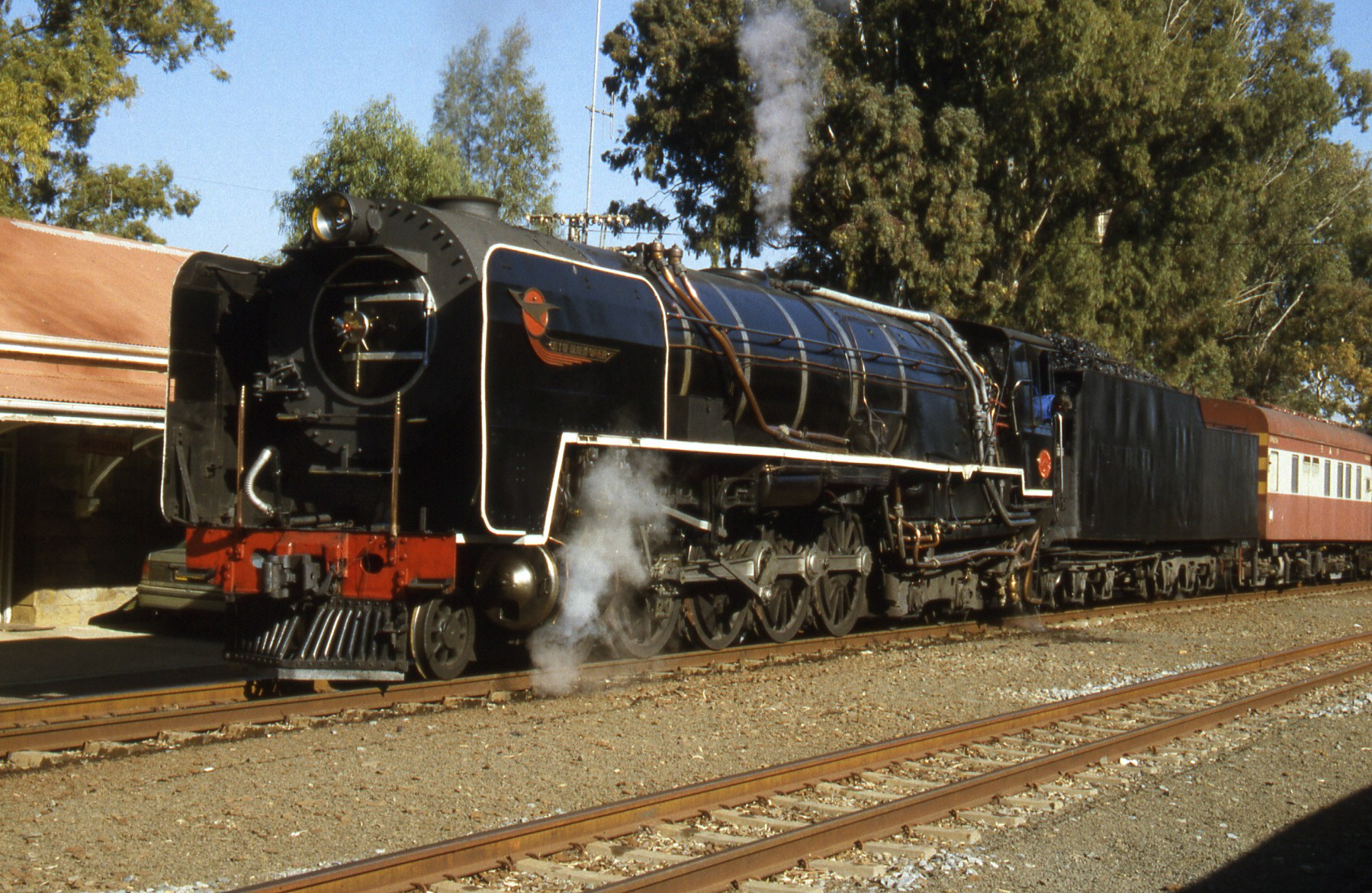
South African Railways Class 25NC No. 3410

Between 1953 and 1955, the South African Railways (SAR) placed fifty Class 25NC 4-8-4 Northern locomotives in service. Designed under the direction of Chief Mechanical Engineer L.C. Grubb, eleven of these locomotives were built by North British Locomotive Company (NBL) and 39 by Henschel & Son. They were tended by Type EW1 tenders which rode on six-wheeled bogies. Two versions of the same locomotive were built, the Class 25NC being the non-condensing version, hence the "NC" suffix to the class number.

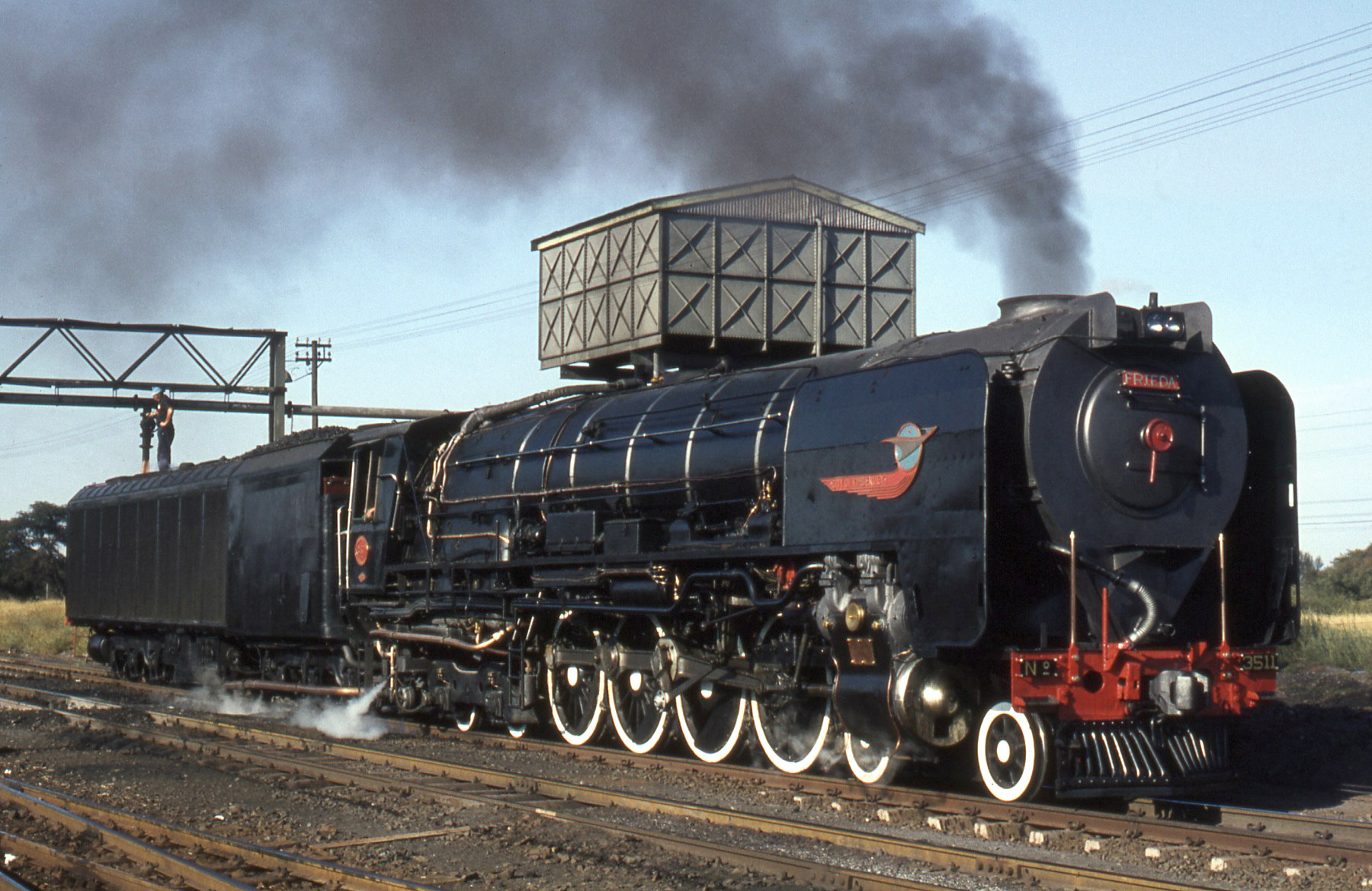
SAR Class 25 No. 3511

Ninety Class 25 condensing locomotives were introduced simultaneously, acquired as a means to deal with the shortage of adequate supplies of suitable locomotive water in the arid Karoo. The design work on the engine's condensing apparatus and the enormous condensing tender was carried out by Henschel, who built one locomotive complete with tender as well as sixty of the condensing tenders, to which they held the patent. The other 89 condensing locomotives and thirty tenders were built by NBL.

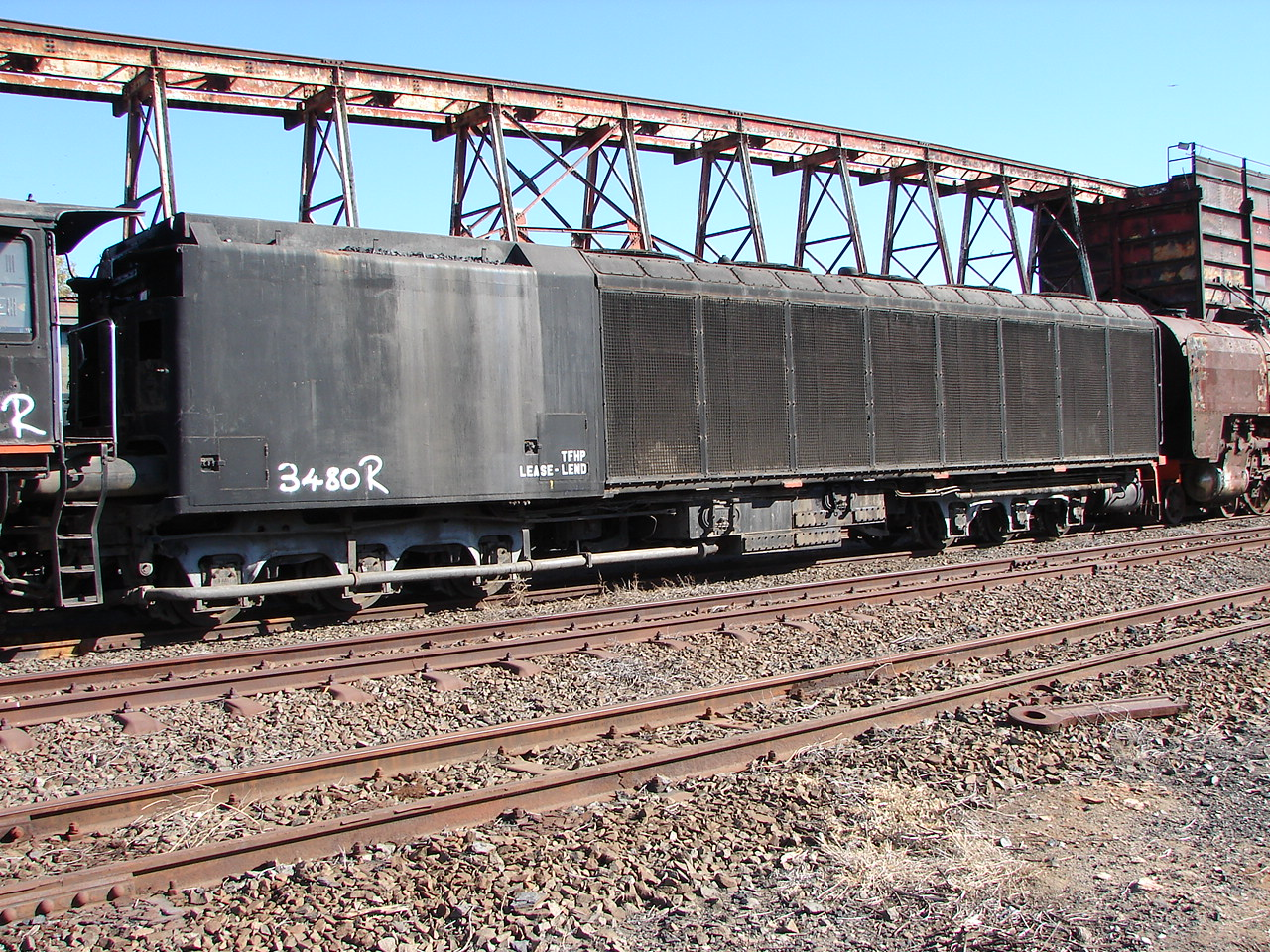
Type CZ condensing tender

The Type CZ condensing tenders were slightly longer than their engines. One-third of the total length of the tender was taken up by the water tank and coal bunker, while the rest was taken up by eight large radiators on each side, cooled by five steam-driven roof-mounted fans. Roller bearings were used throughout on all these locomotives, including the coupling and connecting rods, the crosshead gudgeon pins as well as the three-axle bogies of both the standard and condensing tenders. The leading bogies and coupled wheels had Cannon-type axle boxes. The cylinders and frames were cast in one piece, while the steel cylinders and steam chests were fitted with cast iron liners. The tender frames of both locomotive types were also one-piece steel water-bottom castings. Since they were entirely mounted on roller bearings, very little effort was required to move these big locomotives.

On the condensing locomotives, spent steam was recycled and condensed back to water for repeated use. Since the steam was not expelled up the chimney, the smokebox contained a steam turbine-driven fan beneath the chimney to keep the draught going. Visual evidence of this altered and slightly longer smokebox is the locomotive's banjo-face smokebox front. The condensing system proved extremely efficient and reduced water consumption by as much as 90% by using the same water up to eight times over, which gave the Class 25 a range of 800 kilometres (500 miles) between water refills. In addition, the hot condensate feedwater resulted in significantly reduced coal consumption.

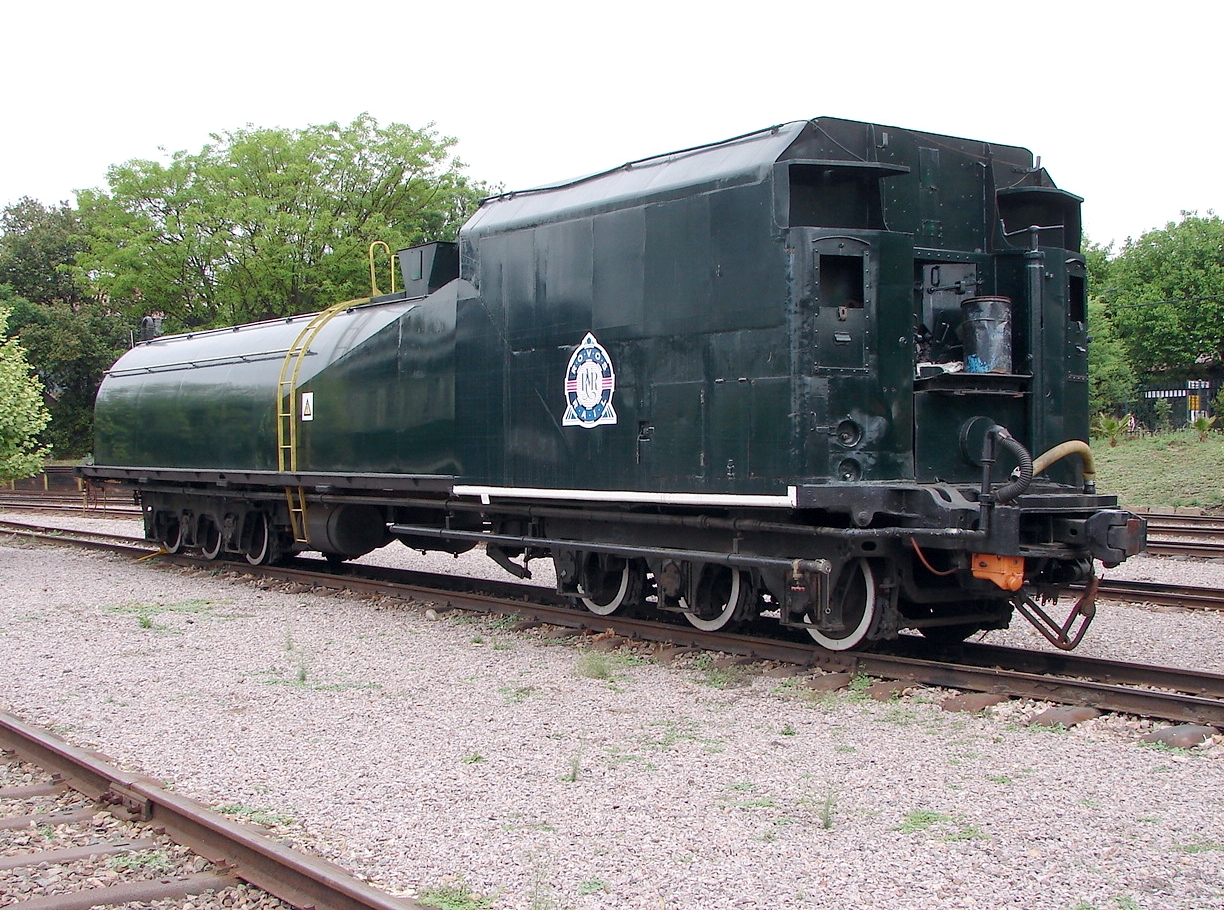
Type EW2 Worshond tender

However, the Class 25 was a complex locomotive that required high maintenance, especially on the turbine blower fans in the smokebox, whose blades needed to be replaced frequently due to damage by solid particles in the exhaust. The equally complex condensing tender also required frequent maintenance. Between 1973 and 1980, partly motivated by the spread of electric and diesel-electric traction, all but three of the locomotives were converted to free-exhausting and non-condensing locomotives and reclassified to Class 25NC. In the process their condensing tenders were also rebuilt to ordinary coal-and-water tenders by removing the condensing radiators and roof fans and replacing it with a massive round-topped water tank. Since the tenders were built on single cast-steel main frames, it was impractical to attempt to shorten them. Locomotives with these rebuilt Type EW2 tenders were soon nicknamed Worshond (Sausage dog or Dachshund).

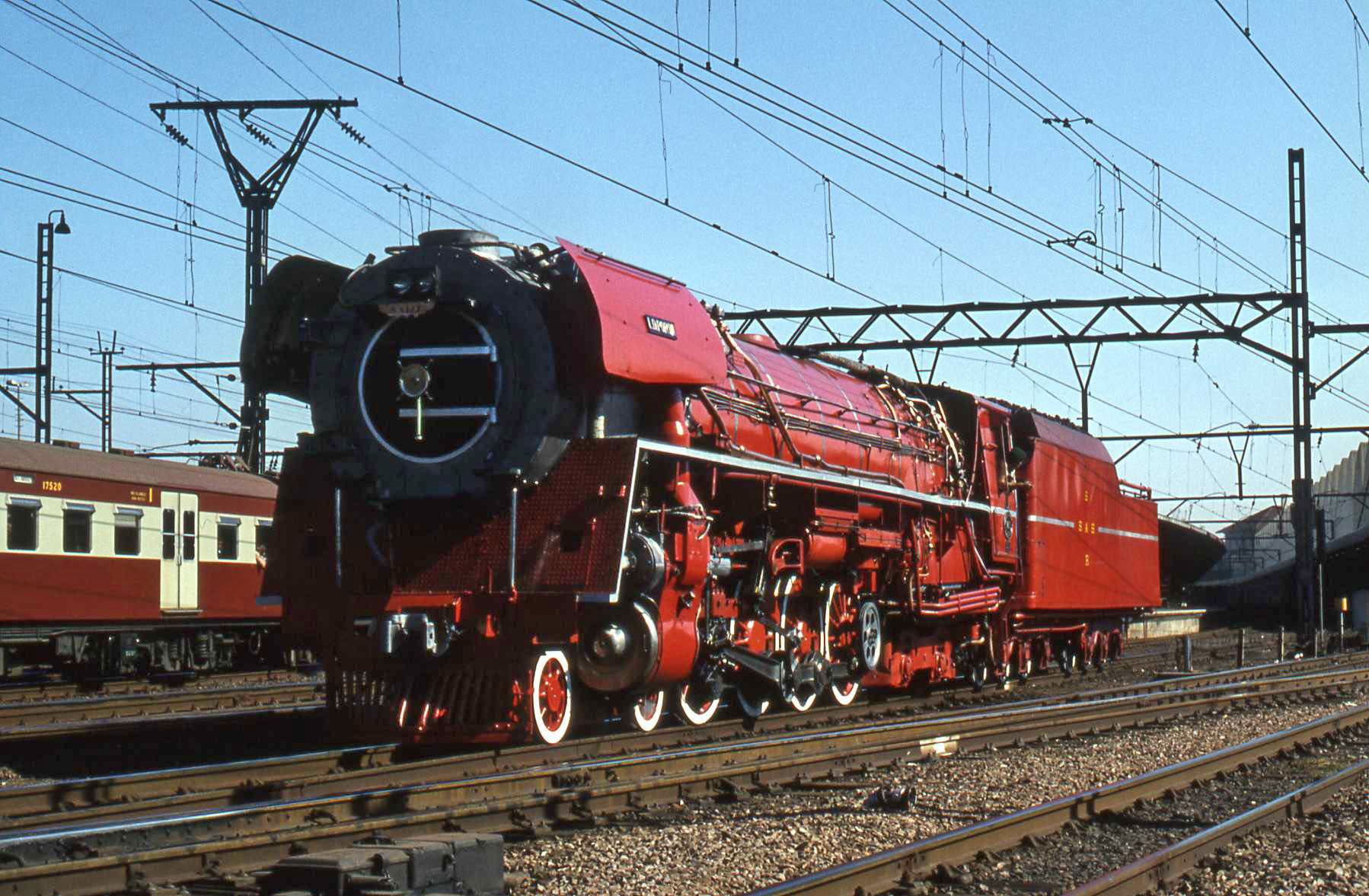
Class 26 Red Devil No. 3450

The Class 26, popularly known as the Red Devil, was rebuilt from Henschel-built Class 25NC No. 3450 by mechanical engineer David Wardale. The rebuilding took place at the Salt River shops of the SAR in Cape Town and was based on the principles developed by Argentinian mechanical engineer Livio Dante Porta. The primary objectives of the modifications were to improve the combustion and steaming rate to reduce the emission of wasteful black smoke and to overcome the problem of clinkering. This was achieved by the use of a Gas Producer Combustion System (GPCS), which relies on the gasification of coal on a low temperature firebed so that the gases are then fully burnt above the firebed. The GPCS minimises the amount of air being drawn up through the firebed, the main source of air required for combustion being through ancillary air intakes on the firebox sides above the firebed.

The modified locomotive became the only Class 26. Compared to an unmodified Class 25NC, the Red Devil achieved a 28% measured saving on coal and a 30% measured saving on water, measured during freight service, and a 43% increase in drawbar power based on the maximum recorded drawbar power. Its approximate maximum range in full load freight service on 1% to 1 1/4% grades was 700 kilometres (430 miles) based on its coal capacity, and 230 kilometres (140 miles) based on its water capacity. The maximum recorded freight load hauled relative to gradient was 900 tonnes (890 long tons; 990 short tons) on 2% grades, and it could haul a 650 tonnes (640 long tons; 720 short tons) passenger train at a constant speed of 100 kilometres per hour (62 miles per hour) on 1% grades. The Red Devil's great power, however, also turned out to be its one weakness. The Class 25NC had already proven to be on the slippery side and the much more powerful Class 26, with essentially still the same dimensions as the Class 25NC, was even worse. It was a poor performer at starting or at low speeds on steep gradients.

=== Soviet Union ===
Outside North America, the largest fleet of 4-8-4 locomotives was the Class P36 of the Sovetskie Zheleznye Dorogi (SZhD) or Soviet Railways, of which 251 were built by the Kolomna locomotive works between 1949 and 1956. As the last Soviet standard class steam locomotive, the Class P36 shared some common components and design attributes with earlier standard Soviet designs such as the L class 2-10-0 Decapod type and LV class 2-10-2 Santa Fe type, as well as some common attributes with the P34 class 2-6-6-2 Mallet and P38 class 2-8-8-4 Yellowstone type Mallet. For example, the P36 and LV classes shared the same feedwater heater, made by the Bryansk machine factory. Apart from a trio of fully streamlined 4-6-4 Baltic-type locomotives, they were the only semi-streamlined steam locomotives built in Russia.

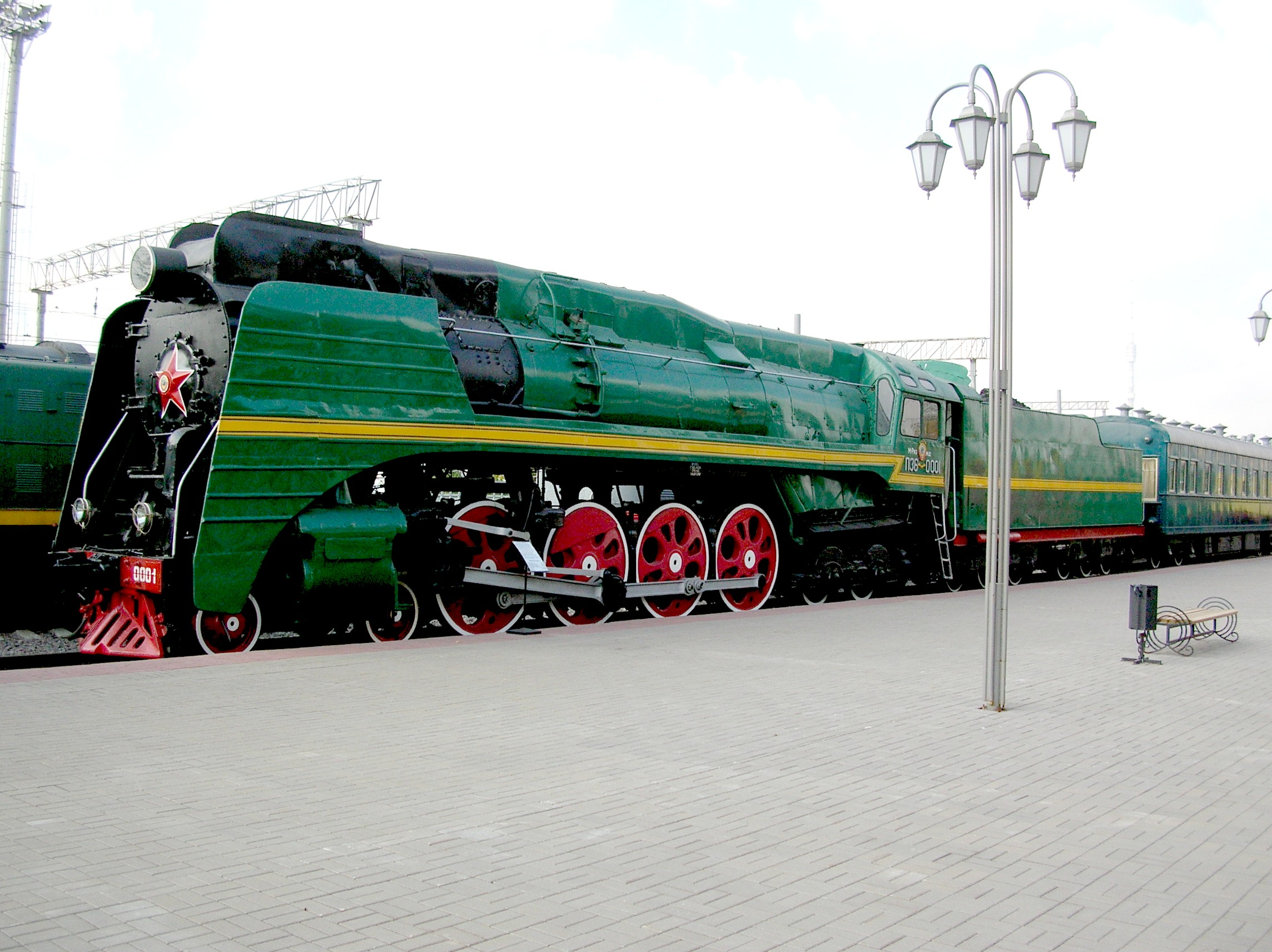
Class P36-0071

The Class P36 was one of the best passenger steam locomotive classes built in the Soviet Union. They had boilers with 243.2 square metres (2,618 square feet) of heating surface that had a working boiler pressure of 1.5 megapascals (220 pounds per square inch). Russian-designed roller bearings were fitted throughout and the boilers were designed to provide a continuous steaming capacity of 57 kilograms (126 pounds) per one square metre (11 square feet) of heating surface in the boiler. With its 575 by 800 millimetres (22.6 by 31.5 inches) cylinders and 1,850 millimetres (72.83 inches) diameter coupled wheels, it could easily attain speeds up to 125 kilometres per hour (78 miles per hour) with passenger trains of up to 800 tonnes (790 long tons; 880 short tons).

The Class P36 first appeared on the Oktyabrskaya Railway (October Railway) to haul principal express trains between Moscow and Leningrad, but they did not remain on this 650 kilometres (400 miles) mainline long. Diesels took over after only a few years and the P36 class locomotives were transferred to other lines and depots, such as the Moscow–Kursk and Moscow–Ryazan lines, Kalinin, Krasnoyarsk, Belarusian Railway, Melitopol depot, Kuibyshev and Alexandrov depot.

Later, when electrification and dieselisation expanded, many of the Class P36 locomotives were transferred to work on the Lviv, Far East, Eastern Siberia, and Transbaikal Railways. The last was withdrawn from regular scheduled express passenger train service in 1974. All were staged in full working order and kept in reserve for times of extraordinary demand. At certain intervals, the locomotives were taken out from staging, steamed up and put to work to haul trains to test the condition of the locomotives. In the late 1980s, these strategic reserves of locomotives were disbanded and the Class P36 locomotives were distributed to museums and for preservation. Some that had not seen regular use for more than fifteen years and were in the worst mechanical condition, were scrapped. It was found that the roller bearings suffered most by standing unused. When the computerised new class numbers were introduced by the Russian Ministry of Railways, the Class P36 were designated Class 1000.0001 to 1000.0251. In the 1990s, after the collapse of the Soviet Union, a number were sold to private train operators.

=== Spain ===
In the 1910s and 20s the MZA (Madrid a Zaragoza y a Alicante), Ripoll & Puigcerdá and Norte railways bought tank engines of this wheel arrangement to displace their preexisting 4-6-4 engines on heavy suburban trains, the MZA's engines would be renumbered under RENFE as 242-0231 to 242-2900 and would pull trains around Barcelona and Girona before being replaced by diesels during the 1960s, with a 242T tank engine based on this design preserved outside of a power station in Andorra.

The Norte's engines, now numbered 242-0401 to 22-0406 would have a similar lifespan, and the R&P's own presumably lasting just as long, though little information survives of them.

The 242F class express passenger 4-8-4 locomotives were designed by the Red Nacional de los Ferrocarriles Españoles (RENFE) in 1955 and were remarkably well-proportioned. Developed from a preceding 4-8-2 Mountain type, they had improved steam passages and developed 30 to 40 per cent more power at medium cut-offs and high speed. Ten of these locomotives were built by La Maquinista Terrestre y Maritima SA in Barcelona to burn fuel oil. They had Witte type smoke deflectors and were fitted with a double KylChap (Kylälä-Chapelon) blast-pipe, a Worthington feedwater heater and a Traitement Integral Armand (TIA) water-softening device. To increase the comfort of the locomotive crew, the cabs had wooden floors mounted on springs, and the seats of the driver and fireman were also sprung, a very welcome improvement for long runs on poor tracks. These locomotives were painted in a green livery when turned out from the builder's works at Barcelona and were consequently nicknamed Las Verdes (The Greens).

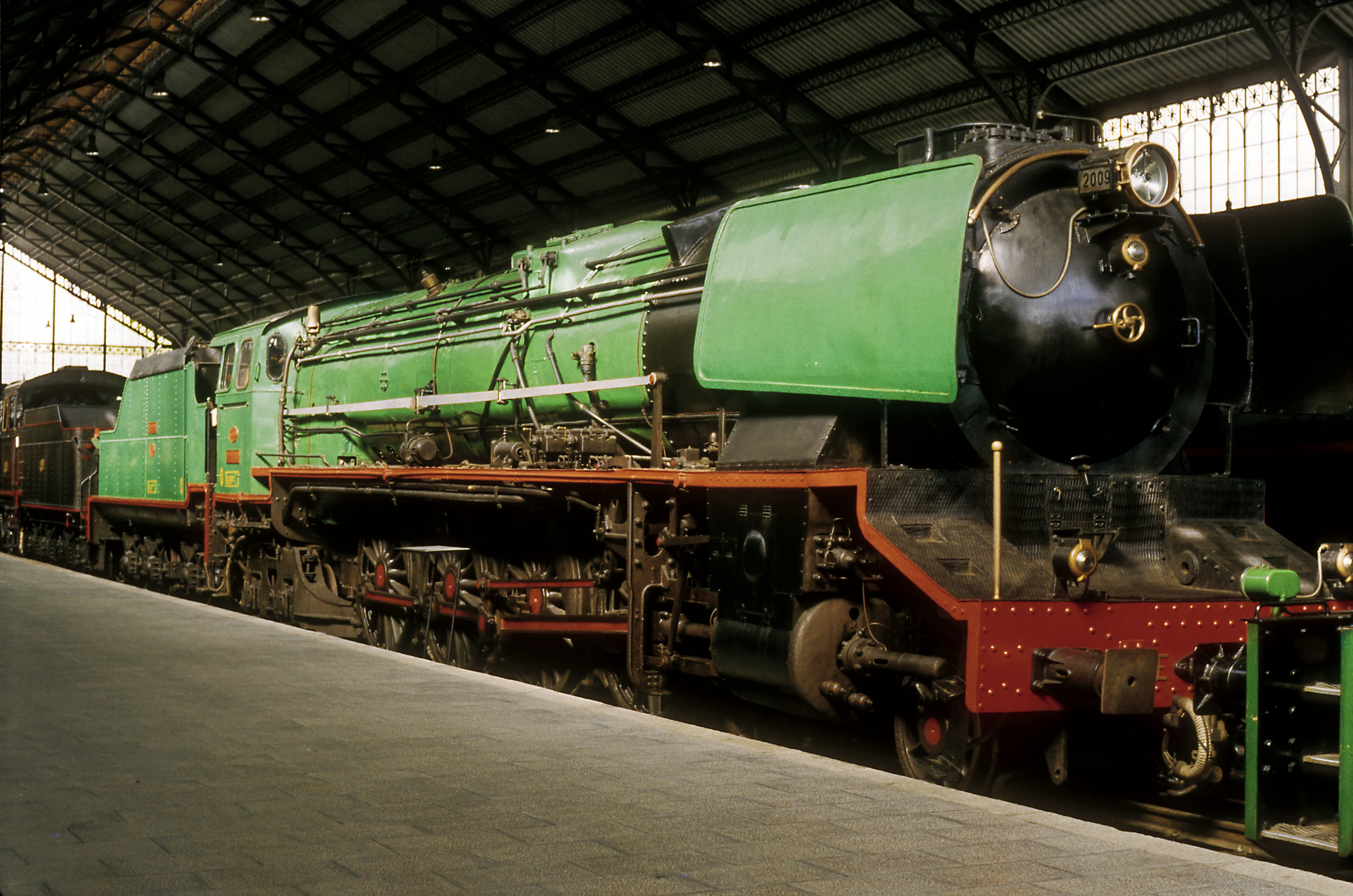
Renfe 242F class

The 242F class was the fastest Spanish steam locomotive. When tested on the line from Barcelona to Tarragona across 10.4 miles (16.7 kilometres) of practically level and straight line between Vilanova i la Geltrú and Sant Vicent, a speed exceeding 84 miles per hour (135 kilometres per hour) was sustained twice, first with a train of 430 tons and then with a train of 480 tons. High-capacity tests took place between Madrid and Ávila when a train weighing 426 tons, including a dynamometer car, was hauled at sustained speeds of 70.3 miles per hour (113.1 kilometres per hour) up a gradient of 0.35% (1 in 286), 57.2 miles per hour (92.1 kilometres per hour) up a gradient of 1.05% (1 in 95) and 39.1 miles per hour (62.9 kilometres per hour) up a gradient of 2 1/4% (1 in 44.5). The gross horsepower figures recorded with the dynamometer car were 1790, 2350 and 2320 respectively, the calculated horsepower on the rail being 2600, 3400 and 3580. The latter output translates to about 4,000 indicated horsepower (3,000 kilowatts).

With these locomotives, there was some concern about water supply. The capacity of the tender was limited, at only 6,200 imperial gallons (28,000 litres), and, with few watering points in service, the full capacity of the locomotive was not always used for fear of running short of this essential commodity in the semi-arid Spanish landscape. For example, for the 163-kilometre-long (101-mile) stretch between Medina del Campo and Burgos that rises 131 metres (430 feet) with an uphill start, three intermediate stops, one slack and some shunting movements to couple extra coaches to the train, the amount of water consumed was about 7,300 imperial gallons (33,000 litres).

All ten locomotives were allocated to the Miranda de Ebro shed to haul principal heavy express trains. In the 1960s, they were a familiar sight at the head of the premier express trains, but in 1971 they were transferred entirely to semi-fast passenger trains and even to the haulage of heavy seasonal fruit trains between Castejón and Alsasua from October to January. One locomotive, No. 242F.2009, is preserved at the Madrid Railway Museum.

=== United Kingdom ===
In 1938 William Stanier considered a 4-6-4 express passenger locomotive design, together with a 4-8-4 version as a large mixed-traffic locomotive. War intervened and suspended development of express passenger locomotives, but the 4-8-4 design was re-examined in 1942 by Fairburn, the acting CME, as a possible post-war type for fast goods trains.

While no steam locomotives were known to be this type, an experimental diesel-mechanical locomotive, the British Rail 10100, had this wheel arrangement, but it was scrapped after a gearbox failure caused a loss of interest in the project.

=== United States ===
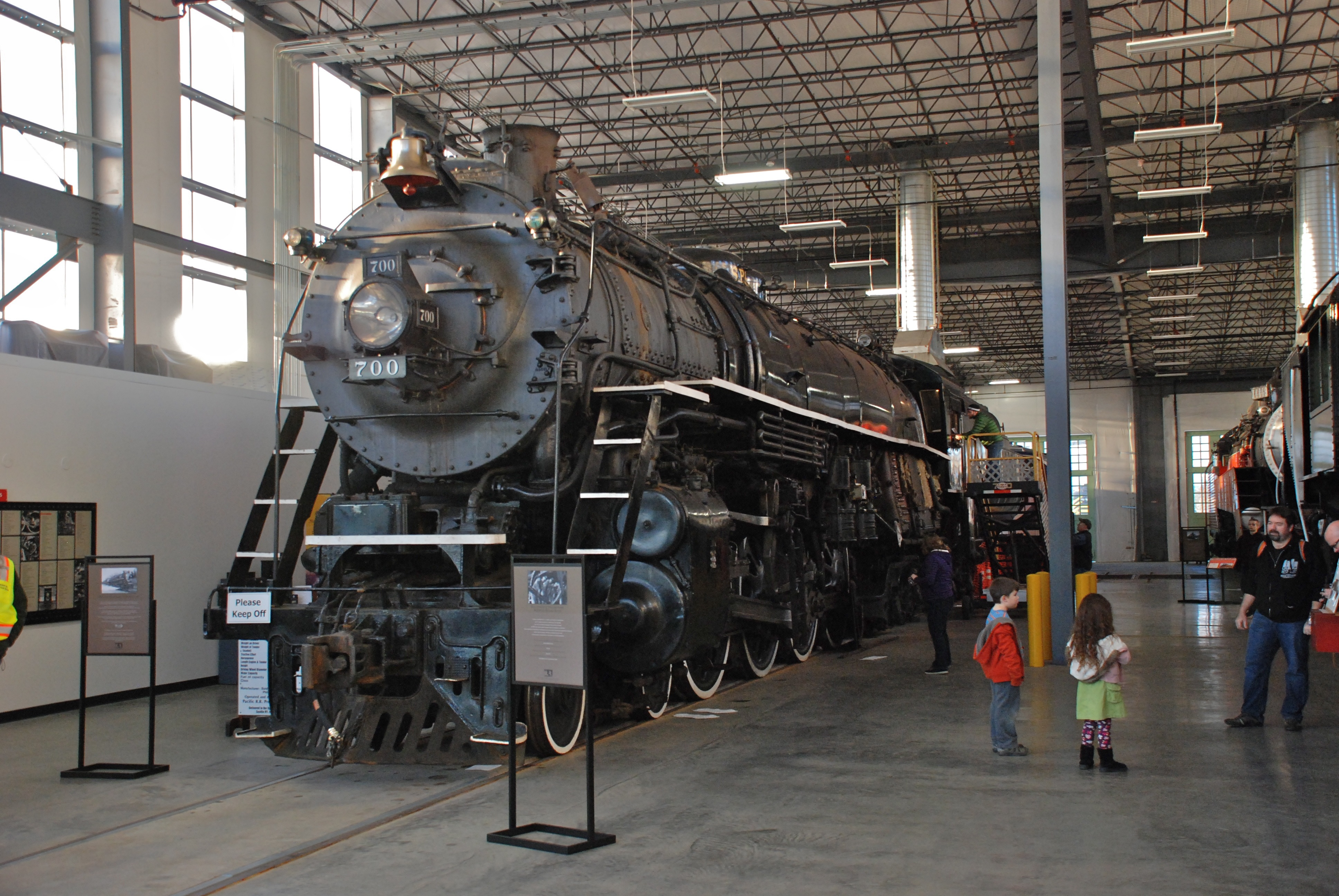
Spokane, Portland and Seattle No. 700

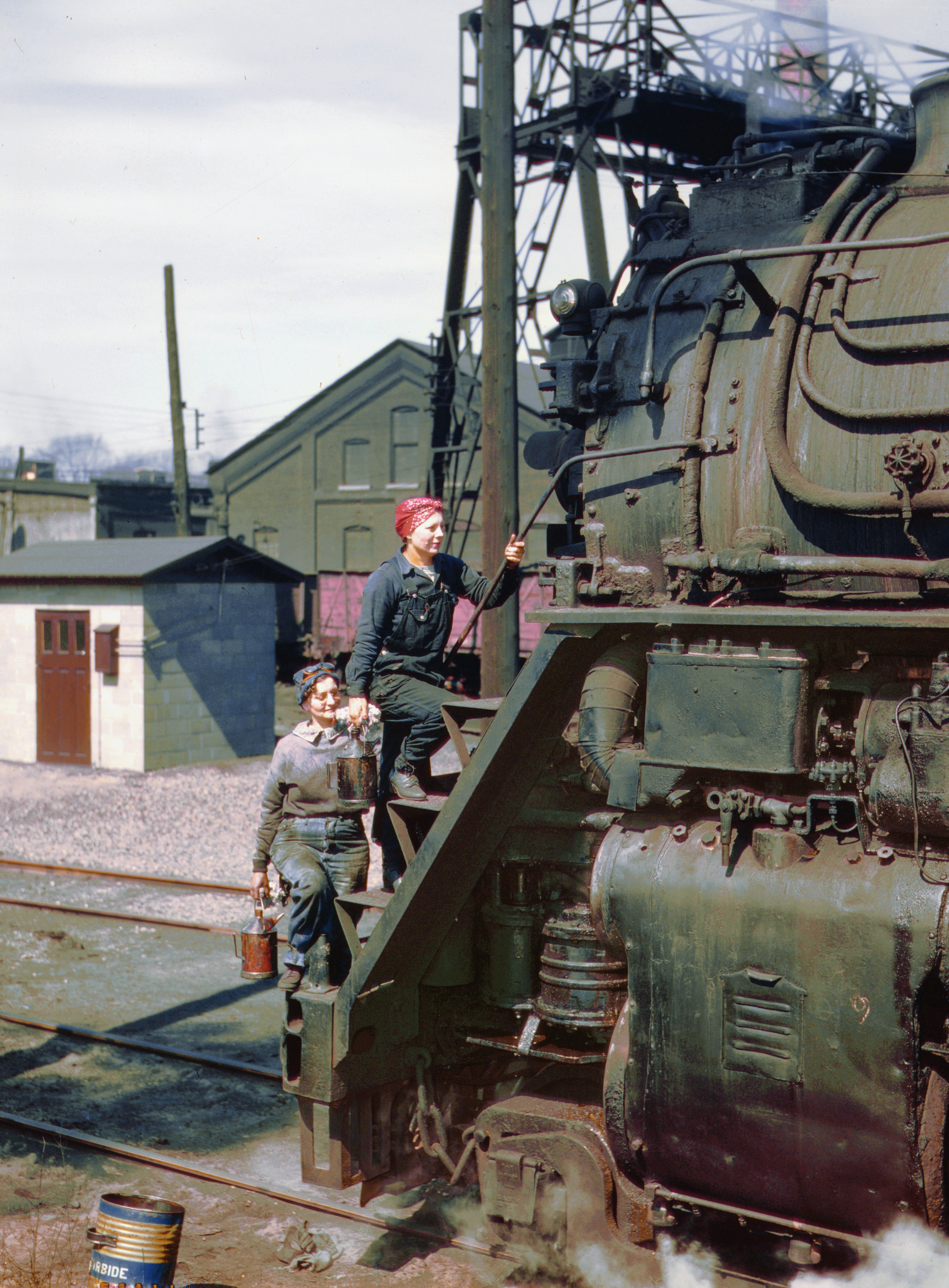
Women wipers of the Chicago and North Western Railroad cleaning one of the 4-8-4 "Northern" H-class steam locomotives, Clinton, Iowa, 1943

The American 4-8-4 was a heavy locomotive, with nearly all examples in the United States having axle loads of more than 30 short tons (27 t). On railroads with rail of 130 to 133 pounds per yard (64 to 66 kg/m), axle loads of more than 36 short tons (33 t) were permitted. Exceptionally heavy 4-8-4s were therefore introduced on the Atchison, Topeka and Santa Fe (Santa Fe), Chicago and North Western (CNW), Chesapeake and Ohio (C&O), Milwaukee Road (MILW), Northern Pacific (NP), Norfolk and Western (N&W), Spokane, Portland and Seattle (SP&S) and Western Maryland (WM) railroads. The Santa Fe Class 2900 had the heaviest axle load of all at 38.75 short tons (35.15 t) as well as being the heaviest 4-8-4s ever built, weighing 974,850 lb (442,180 kg) total. The lightest 4-8-4s in the United States were the six H-10 class locomotives of the Toledo, Peoria and Western (TPW), with an axle load of 23 short tons (21 t).

Some 4-8-4s were used on exceptionally long runs.

- The Santa Fe Heavy Mountains were rostered to haul the Chief and Fast Mail trains between La Junta, Colorado, and Los Angeles across 1,255 miles (2,020 km), and also handled the Grand Canyon Limited between Los Angeles and Wellington, Kansas, across 1,534 miles (2,469 km). From 1942, they ran through from Los Angeles to Kansas City via the Belen Cutoff and Amarillo, Texas, a distance of 1,789 miles (2,879 km), setting a new record for through steam locomotive rosters.
- The Niagaras of the New York Central Railroad (NYC) also accomplished long runs on New York to Chicago passenger trains, including the Chicagoan and the Commodore Vanderbilt.
- The Northern Pacific 4-8-4s hauled the North Coast Limited across 1,008 miles (1,622 km) from St. Paul, Minnesota, to Livingston, Montana.
- The Great Northern S-2 Class of 4-8-4s hauled the Empire Builder across 1,306 miles (2,102 km) from St. Paul, Minnesota, to Wenatchee, Washington, and possibly as far west to Seattle, a maximum distance of 1,400 miles (2,300 km).

Several of the earlier 4-8-4 locomotive models were modified or rebuilt during their service lives.

- Santa Fe developed their 4-8-4s for years, and named the classes based on the number of the first locomotive in the class. The fourteen 3751 class locomotives that were introduced in 1927 and 1928 were of conservative design, with 73-inch-diameter (1,850 mm) driving wheels and a boiler pressure of 210 psi (1,400 kPa). In 1938, these locomotives were rebuilt with more modern features, including new 80-inch-diameter (2,030 mm) Boxpok driving wheels, wider steam passages to and from the cylinders, the boiler pressure raised to 230 psi (1,600 kPa) and roller bearings on all engine axles. This gave them a maximum drawbar power of 3,600 horsepower (2,700 kW) at 50 mph (80 km/h). Engine No. 3752 was equipped with Franklin rotary cam poppet valve gear and achieved the very low steam rate of 13.5 lb per indicated horsepower-hour (2.28 mg/J). These locomotives were permitted to run at 90 mph (140 km/h), but they were alleged to have exceeded 100 mph (160 km/h) several times.
- The heavy Class H Northerns of the Chicago and Northwestern Railroad were rebuilt in 1940 with lightweight rods, Boxpok driving wheels and roller bearings on all axles, and the boiler pressure was raised from 250 to 275 psi (1,720 to 1,900 kPa). Some years later, 24 of them underwent another rebuild which included new nickel-steel frames, new cylinders, pilot beams and air reservoirs, new fireboxes and other minor improvements. These were reclassified as Class H-1.
- The S-2 Class Northerns of the Great Northern Railway were rebuilt to have Timken roller bearings on every axle in 1945, replacing their original plain bearings. Vestibule cabs were added to engine 2577 in the early 1930s and engines 2582, 2586, 2587 and 2588 by the late 1940s.

Some Northern locomotives were also rebuilt from older engines. Between 1945 and 1947, the Reading Railroad rebuilt thirty of their heavy I-10 class 2-8-0 Consolidations to booster-fitted 4-8-4 Northern locomotives with 70-inch-diameter (1,780 mm) driving wheels. An additional ring was added at the smokebox end of the boiler, which increased the length of the boiler tubes from 13 feet 6 inches (4.11 m) to 20 feet (6.1 m), and a larger smokebox was installed which increased the distance between the tube plate and the chimney centre line from 34 to 111 inches (0.86 to 2.82 m). Steam pressure was raised from 220 to 240 psi (1,500 to 1,700 kPa). Four syphons were fitted, three in the firebox proper and one in the combustion chamber. A twelve-wheeled tender was attached, weighing 167 tons in working order, with a capacity of 23.5 tons of coal and 19,000 US gallons (72,000 L) of water. A new cast-steel frame was used, with the cylinders cast integral and roller bearings on all axles. They were reclassified to T1 and numbered 2100 to 2129. Two of these locomotives, preserved for hauling special trains, were still in use in 1963.

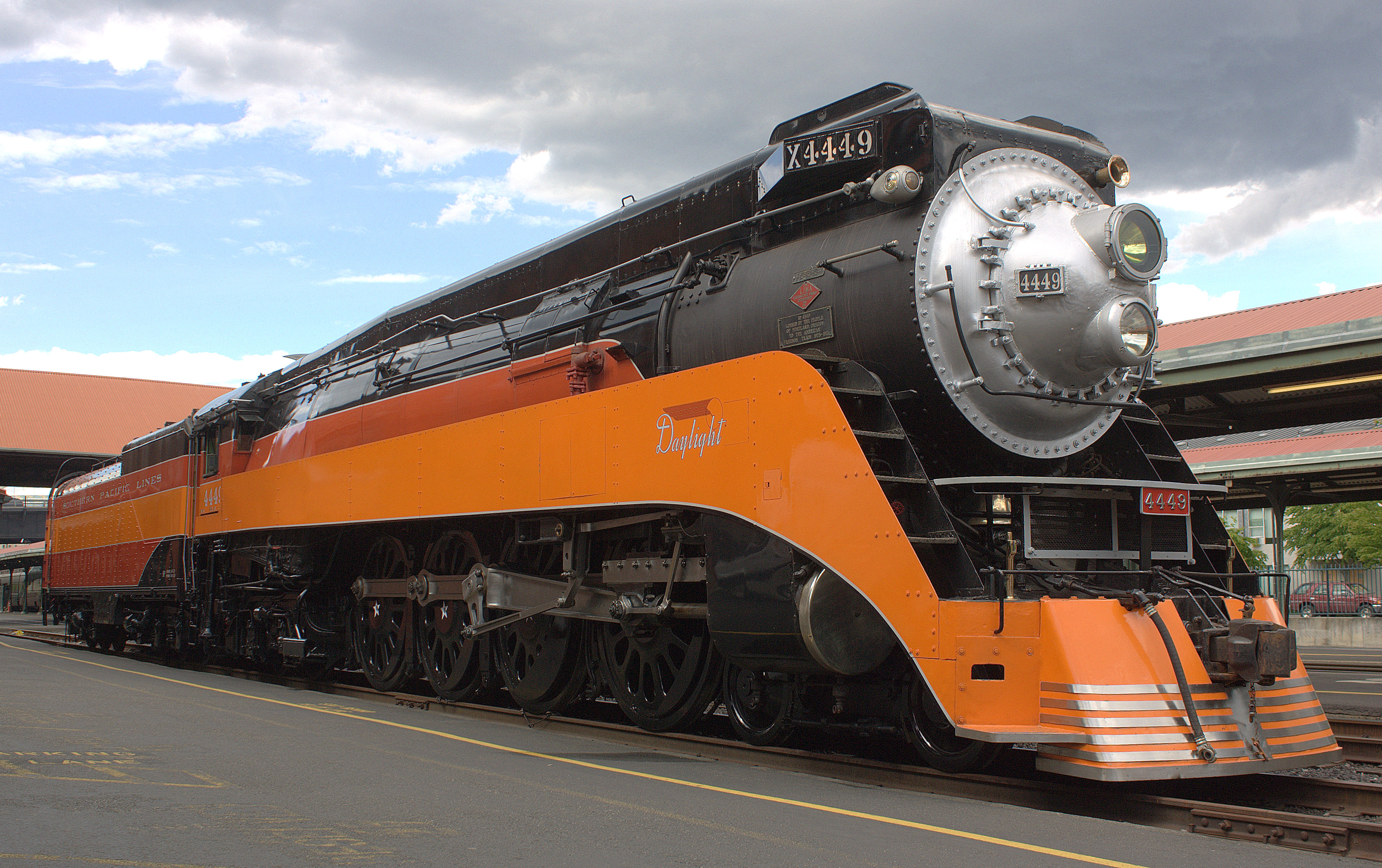
Southern Pacific GS-4 class

The Northerns were workhorses that went without much public recognition, with a few exceptions. The GS-4 class Golden State locomotives of Southern Pacific Railroad (SP), of which 36 were built by Lima Locomotive Works in 1941 and 1942, were semi-streamlined and were given a striking livery with a broad orange valence over the wheels below a narrow red band that came halfway up the cab windows. The locomotives headed the Coast Daylight train on the railroad's Coast Line between Los Angeles and San Francisco. The television program Adventures of Superman is introduced with a shot of an SP GS-4 as the narrator declares that Superman is "more powerful than a locomotive." One of them, Southern Pacific 4449, has been restored and is in operating condition.

Even after the demise of steam, the Northern type has been in the spotlight of publicity and, along with Union Pacific 844 of the Union Pacific FEF Series and Norfolk and Western 611 of the Norfolk and Western Class J series, among other Northerns, have been the favoured type to provide mainline excursions in the United States. The former is the only steam locomotive of a Class I railroad never to have been retired.

== North American production list ==
Most North American 4-8-4s were built by ALCO, Lima and the Baldwin Locomotive Works, while Canadian National Railway's fleet was built by Montreal Locomotive Works. Only the Canadian Pacific Railway, the Norfolk and Western Railway, the St. Louis Southwestern Railway (Cotton Belt) and the Reading Railroad built or rebuilt their own. The Missouri Pacific rebuilt one class of their 4-8-4s from their class BK-63 2-8-4s.

The Northern type was used by 37 railroads in the Americas, including 31 railroads in the United States, three in Canada, one in Mexico and two in Brazil. In all, there were fewer than 1,200 locomotives of this type in North America, compared to the approximately 2,500 4-8-2 Mountain types and 6,800 4-6-2 Pacific types. By far the largest fleet was owned by the CN and its subsidiary, the Grand Trunk Western Railroad, with altogether 203 locomotives.

North American 4-8-4 locomotive operators
Railroad (Quantity, Nickname)	Class	Road numbers	Builder	Build year	Notes
Northern Pacific Railway (48 "Northerns")	A	2600–2611	Alco	1926	All scrapped by 1957.
Northern Pacific Railway (48 "Northerns")	A-1	2626	Alco	1930	ex-Timken 1111. Scrapped 1957, but SP&S 700 is well known for looking very identical to the class.
Northern Pacific Railway (48 "Northerns")	A-2	2650–2659	Baldwin	1934	Scrapped 1957, but SP&S 700 is well known for looking very identical to the class.
Northern Pacific Railway (48 "Northerns")	A-3	2660–2667	Baldwin	1938	Scrapped 1957, but SP&S 700 is well known for looking very identical to the class.
Northern Pacific Railway (48 "Northerns")	A-4	2670–2677	Baldwin	1941	Scrapped 1957, but SP&S 700 is well known for looking very identical to the class.
Northern Pacific Railway (48 "Northerns")	A-5	2680–2689	Baldwin	1943	Scrapped 1957, but SP&S 700 is well known for looking very identical to the class.
Atchison, Topeka and Santa Fe Railway (65 "Heavy Mountains")	3751	3751–3764	Baldwin	1927–1929	3751 is used as an excursion loco, 3759 preserved in Kingman, AZ.
Atchison, Topeka and Santa Fe Railway (65 "Heavy Mountains")	3765	3765–3775	Baldwin	1938	3768 preserved.
Atchison, Topeka and Santa Fe Railway (65 "Heavy Mountains")	3776	3776–3785	Baldwin	1941	All scrapped between 1953 and 1959
Atchison, Topeka and Santa Fe Railway (65 "Heavy Mountains")	2900	2900–2929	Baldwin	1943–1944	2903, 2912, 2913, 2921, 2925 and 2926 preserved, with 2926 restored to operating condition and will be used as an excursion locomotive.
Canadian National Railways (160 “Confederations", later "Northerns")	U-2-a	6100–6119	CLC	1927	All Scrapped between 1953 and 1955.
Canadian National Railways (160 “Confederations", later "Northerns")	U-2-b	6120–6139	MLW	1927	All Scrapped between 1955 and 1958.
Canadian National Railways (160 “Confederations", later "Northerns")	U-2-c	6140–6159	MLW	1929	6153 preserved, remainder scrapped between 1955 and 1956.
Canadian National Railways (160 “Confederations", later "Northerns")	U-2-d	6160–6164	MLW	1936	All scrapped between 1956 and 1957.
Canadian National Railways (160 “Confederations", later "Northerns")	U-2-e	6165–6179	MLW	1940	6167 preserved, remainder scrapped by 1957.
Canadian National Railways (160 “Confederations", later "Northerns")	U-2-f	6180–6189	CLC	1940	All scrapped by 1958.
Canadian National Railways (160 “Confederations", later "Northerns")	U-2-g	6200–6234	MLW	1943	6200, 6213 and 6218 preserved, remainder scrapped between 1958 and 1959.
Canadian National Railways (160 “Confederations", later "Northerns")	U-2-h	6235–6264	MLW	1944	All Scrapped by 1959.
Canadian National Railways (160 “Confederations", later "Northerns")	U-4-a	6400-6404	MLW	1936	Streamlined, 6400 preserved, remainder scrapped by 1959.
Canadian National subsidiary, Grand Trunk Western (43 "Confederations", later "Northerns")	U-3-a	6300–6311	Alco	1927	All Scrapped by 1959.
Canadian National subsidiary, Grand Trunk Western (43 "Confederations", later "Northerns")	U-3-b	6312–6336	Alco	1942–1943	6323 and 6325 preserved.
Canadian National subsidiary, Grand Trunk Western (43 "Confederations", later "Northerns")	U-4-b	6405–6410	Lima	1938	Streamlined, all scrapped by 1959.
Delaware, Lackawanna and Western Railroad (55 "Poconos")	Q-1	1501–1505	Alco	1927	All scrapped between 1947 and 1949.
Delaware, Lackawanna and Western Railroad (55 "Poconos")	Q-2	1601–1620	Alco	1929	All scrapped between 1950 and 1953.
Delaware, Lackawanna and Western Railroad (55 "Poconos")	Q-3	1621–1630	Alco	1932	All scrapped between 1953 and 1955.
Delaware, Lackawanna and Western Railroad (55 "Poconos")	Q-4	1631–1650	Alco	1934	All scrapped between 1955 and 1959.
Canadian Pacific Railway (2 "Northerns")	K1a	3100–3101	CP (Angus)	1928	Both retired 1955 and are preserved.
Chicago and North Western Railway (35 "Northerns")	H	3001–3035	Baldwin	1929	24 rebuilt to H-1, all later scrapped.
Chicago, Rock Island and Pacific Railroad (85 "Northerns")	R-67	5000–5064	Alco	1929–1930	All scrapped between 1947 and 1953.
Chicago, Rock Island and Pacific Railroad (85 "Northerns")	R-67	5100–5119	Alco	1944, 1946	All scrapped between 1949 and 1955.
Denver and Rio Grande Western Railroad (19 "Westerns")	M-64	1700–1713	Baldwin	1929	All scrapped between 1951 and 1956.
Denver and Rio Grande Western Railroad (19 "Westerns")	M-68	1800–1804	Baldwin	1938	All scrapped between 1952 and 1954.
Great Northern Railway (20 "Northerns")	S-1	2550–2555	Baldwin	1929	All scrapped between 1956 and 1963.
Great Northern Railway (20 "Northerns")	S-2	2575–2588	Baldwin	1930	First 4-8-4s built with 80" driving wheels. 2584 preserved at the Havre depot in Havre, Montana, remainder scrapped between 1955 and 1963.
Chicago, Burlington and Quincy Railroad (36 "Northerns")	O-5	5600–5607	Baldwin	1930	All scrapped by 1955.
Chicago, Burlington and Quincy Railroad (36 "Northerns")	O-5a	5608–5635	CB&Q	1936–1940	Six converted to oil burning O-5b class while in revenue service by the CB&Q. 5614, 5629, 5631 and 5633 preserved.
Milwaukee Road (52 "Northerns")	S1	9700	Baldwin	1930	Renumbered 250 in 1938, retired 1954 and scrapped.
Milwaukee Road (52 "Northerns")	S1	251	MILW	1938	Retired 1954 and scrapped.
Milwaukee Road (52 "Northerns")	S2	201–240	Baldwin	1937, 1940	Scrapped between 1948 and 1954.
Milwaukee Road (52 "Northerns")	S3	260–269	Alco	1943	261 used as an excursion locomotive, 265 preserved at the Illinois Railway Museum, remainder scrapped between 1954 and 1959.
Nashville, Chattanooga and St. Louis Railway (25 "Dixies")	J-2	565–569	Alco	1930	Scrapped by 1952.
Nashville, Chattanooga and St. Louis Railway (25 "Dixies")	J-3	570–589	Alco	1942	576 preserved and under restoration by the Nashville Steam Preservation Society in Centennial Park in Nashville, Tennessee; and the only surviving 4-8-4 that worked for Nashville, Chattanooga and St. Louis Railroad, remainder scrapped between 1952 and 1955.
St. Louis Southwestern Railway aka "Cotton Belt" (20 "Northerns")	L-1	800–809	Baldwin	1930	All Scrapped by 1953.
St. Louis Southwestern Railway aka "Cotton Belt" (20 "Northerns")	L-1	810–819	SSW	1937, 1942–1943	819 is the youngest and only surviving Class L1 Northern and under restoration at the Arkansas Railroad Museum in Pine Bluff, Arkansas.
Southern Pacific (70 "Golden States" or "General Service")	GS-1	4400–4409	Baldwin	1930	All Scrapped between 1953 and 1959.
Southern Pacific (70 "Golden States" or "General Service")	GS-2	4410–4415	Lima	1936	All Scrapped between 1955 and 1958.
Southern Pacific (70 "Golden States" or "General Service")	GS-3	4416–4429	Lima	1937	All Scrapped by 1957.
Southern Pacific (70 "Golden States" or "General Service")	GS-4	4430–4457	Lima	1941	4449 preserved and is the only surviving GS-4 and the only surviving Daylight painted steam locomotive. It is used as an excursion loco.
Southern Pacific (70 "Golden States" or "General Service")	GS-5	4458–4459	Lima	1942	Essentially 2 experimental GS-4 locomotives fit with roller bearings. Scrapped by 1958.
Southern Pacific (70 "Golden States" or "General Service")	GS-6	4460–4469	Lima	1943	4460 is the oldest and only surviving GS-6 and the last GS Class 4-8-4 built today displayed at the Museum of Transportation in Kirkwood next to St. Louis, Missouri.
Southern Pacific (70 "Golden States" or "General Service")	GS-7	SSW #801-802, #804-805, #807-809; SP #4479-4481	Baldwin	1930	Scrapped.
Southern Pacific (70 "Golden States" or "General Service")	GS-8	SSW #813, #813, #817-818; SP #4488 (SSW #813), 4485-4487 (815-818)	SSW's Pine Bluff Shops	1930	Scrapped.
Southern Pacific subsidiary, Texas and New Orleans Railroad (4 "Golden States")	GS-1	700–703	Baldwin	1930	Scrapped.
Timken Roller Bearing Company (demonstrator)	A-1	1111	Alco	1930	to NP 2626.
Wabash Railroad (25 "Northerns")	O-1	2900–2924	Baldwin	1930–1931	Scrapped.
Lehigh Valley Railroad (37 "Wyomings")	T-1a	5100–5110	Baldwin	1931–1932	Scrapped.
Lehigh Valley Railroad (37 "Wyomings")	T-2a	5200–5210	Alco	1931–1932	Scrapped.
Lehigh Valley Railroad (37 "Wyomings")	T-2b	5211–5220	Alco	1943	Scrapped.
Lehigh Valley Railroad (37 "Wyomings")	T-3	5125–5129	Baldwin	1934–1935	Scrapped.
New York Central Railroad (28 "Niagaras")	HS-1a	800	Alco	1931	Experimental prototype. Deemed a failure and spent the rest of its career as a switcher locomotive. Scrapped 1955.
New York Central Railroad (28 "Niagaras")	S-1a	6000	Alco	1945	Scrapped.
New York Central Railroad (28 "Niagaras")	S-1b	6001–6025	Alco	1945–1946	Scrapped.
New York Central Railroad (28 "Niagaras")	S-2a	5500	Alco	1946	Fit wit poppet valves. Scrapped.
Chesapeake and Ohio Railway (12 "Greenbriers")	J-3	600–606	Lima	1935, 1942	Named after Virginia statesmen. All Scrapped between 1950 and 1955.
Chesapeake and Ohio Railway (12 "Greenbriers")	J-3-A	610–614	Lima	1948	No. 614 preserved and is the last commercially built passenger steam locomotive in the U.S. It is currently at the Strasburg Rail Road in Ronks, Pennsylvania, undergoing a complete rebuild to operable condition as of July 2025. Remainder scrapped between 1952 and 1958.
Ontario Northland Railway (5 "Northerns")	1100	1100–1104	CLC	1936	All scrapped between 1947 and 1959.
Atlantic Coast Line Railroad (12 "1800s")	R-1	1800–1811	Baldwin	1938	All scrapped between 1953 and 1959.
Richmond, Fredericksburg and Potomac Railroad (27, names by class below)	Generals	551–555	Baldwin	1937	All scrapped by 1949.
Richmond, Fredericksburg and Potomac Railroad (27, names by class below)	Governors	601–612	Baldwin	1938, 1942	All scrapped by 1950.
Richmond, Fredericksburg and Potomac Railroad (27, names by class below)	Statesmen	613–622	Baldwin	1944–1945	All scrapped between 1951 and 1959.
Toledo, Peoria and Western Railway (6 "Northerns")	H-10	80–85	ALCO	1937	All Scrapped between 1947 and 1953.
Union Pacific Railroad (45 "Northerns" or "Four-Eight-Fours"/"FEFs")	FEF-1	800–819	Alco	1937	814 preserved in Council Bluffs, Iowa.
Union Pacific Railroad (45 "Northerns" or "Four-Eight-Fours"/"FEFs")	FEF-2	820–834	Alco	1939	833 preserved in Ogden, Utah.
Union Pacific Railroad (45 "Northerns" or "Four-Eight-Fours"/"FEFs")	FEF-3	835–844	Alco	1944	838 stored in Cheyenne, Wyoming, 844 is the oldest operating steam engine on a Class One Railroad and is used as an excursion locomotive.
Wisconsin Central Railway (4 "Northerns")	O-20	5000–5003	Lima	1938	All Scrapped between 1949 and 1953.
Spokane, Portland and Seattle Railway (3 "Northerns")	E-1	700–702	BLW	1938	NP A-3 class; 700 survives and is used as an excursion loco.
Missouri Pacific Railroad (40 "Northerns")	(ex-BK-63)	2101–2125	MP	1940–1942	Rebuilt from 2-8-4 class BK-63. All scrapped between 1945 and 1959.
Missouri Pacific Railroad (40 "Northerns")	N-73	2201–2215	Baldwin	1943	Scrapped between 1953 and 1958. Wartime restrictions prohibited the MP from designing their own Northern. This class was based on the D&RGW "1800s" design.
Norfolk and Western Railway (14 "J"s)	J	600–613	N&W	1941–1950	611 has been restored and returned to revenue service for excursions in the summer of 2015 and is the only survivor.
Central of Georgia Railway (8 "Big Apples")	K	451–458	Lima	1943	Scrapped by 1953.
Delaware and Hudson Railway (15 "Northerns")	K-62	300–314	Alco	1943	Scrapped between 1949 and 1955.
St. Louis – San Francisco Railway (25 "Northerns")	4500	4500-4524	Baldwin	1942–1943	4500, 4501, 4516 and 4524 preserved.
Western Pacific Railroad (6 "Northerns")	GS-64	481–486	Lima	1943	Built to SP GS-6 specifications due to WPB restrictions.
Reading Railroad (30 "Northerns")	T-1	2100–2129	RDG	1945–1947	2100, 2101, 2102, and 2124 preserved. Converted from Class I-10sa 2-8-0 locomotives.
Ferrocarriles Nacionales de México (32 "Niágaras")	QR-1	3025–3056	Alco (16), Baldwin (16)	1946	3027, 3028, 3030, 3031, 3033, 3034, 3035, 3036, 3038, 3039, 3040 and 3056 preserved. Most sat in scrap lines through the 1960s.
Western Maryland Railway (12 "Potomacs")	J-1	1401–1412	Baldwin	1947	Scrapped by 1957.

== Preservation by country ==
In many countries, the 4-8-4 was a late development of the steam locomotive, close to the time of steam's demise. Many more were therefore preserved than other older wheel arrangements, either plinthed or in museums, with several being kept in running condition. Some of the more notable preserved Northerns worldwide are listed here by country of origin.

Australia

- South Australian Railways 504 "Tom Barr Smith": on static display at the National Railway Museum, Port Adelaide.
- South Australian Railways 520 "Sir Malcolm Barclay‑Harvey": Restored to service in 1972, operating the SteamRanger tourist railway between Mount Barker and Victor Harbor at the time. Removed from operation in 1998, but currently undergoing restoration.
- South Australian Railways 523 "Essington Lewis": on static display at the National Railway Museum, Port Adelaide.
- Victorian Railways H220 (aka "Heavy Harry"): On static display at the Newport Railway Museum in Melbourne, this locomotive is the only surviving three-cylinder example of a 4-8-4.

Canada

- Canadian National 6153: On static display at the Canadian Railway Museum in Delson, Quebec.
- Canadian National 6167: On static display in downtown Guelph, Ontario.
- Canadian National 6200: Canada Science and Technology Museum, Ottawa, Ontario.
- Canadian National 6213: On static display in downtown Toronto, Ontario, at the Toronto Railway Heritage Centre.
- Canadian National 6218: Fort Erie Railroad Museum, Fort Erie, Ontario. Used by CN on excursions in the 1960s and 1970s.
- Canadian National 6400: Canada Science and Technology Museum, Ottawa, Ontario.
- Canadian Pacific 3100: Canada Science and Technology Museum, Ottawa, Ontario.
- Canadian Pacific 3101: On display at EVRAZ (formerly IPSCO Steel), Regina, Saskatchewan.

China

- Class KF1 006: Displayed at the China Railway Museum, Beijing.
- Class KF 7: Displayed at the National Railway Museum, York, England.

Mexico

- N de M 3027: Guadalajara, Jalisco.
- N de M 3028: Retired in 1966, acquired by the Great North Eastern Railroad Foundation, and displayed at the Altamont, New York, fairgrounds until 1983. On lease to the New Hope and Ivyland Railroad.
- N de M 3030: Zacatecas, Zacatecas.
- N de M 3031: Huehuetoca, Mexico.
- N de M 3033: Pachuca, Hidalgo.
- N de M 3034: Puebla, Puebla.
- N de M 3035: Aguascalientes, Aguascalientes.
- N de M 3036: Leon, Guanajuato.
- N de M 3038: Mexico City.
- N de M 3039: Monterrey, Nuevo Leon.
- N de M 3040: Oriental, Puebla.
- N de M 3056: Tequisuiapan, Queretaro.

New Zealand

- K 900: On static display at the Museum of Transport & Technology, Auckland
- K 911: Under overhaul by the Mainline Steam Heritage Trust, Plimmerton.
- K 917: Stored, missing many parts, Steam Incorporated, Paekākāriki.
- K^{A} 935: Awaiting overhaul at the Silver Stream Railway, near Wellington, New Zealand.
- K^{A} 942: In service at the Mainline Steam Heritage Trust, Plimmerton. Was used on mainline excursions.
- K^{A} 945: Stored in dismantled condition at Steam Incorporated, Paekākāriki.
- K^{B} 968: Owned by the Canterbury Railway Society, leased to the Mainline Steam Heritage Trust. Under overhaul at Christchurch.

South Africa

- Class 25 3511: Condenser, staged at Beaconsfield, Kimberley.
- Class 25NC 3405: Displayed at the Buckinghamshire Railway Centre, Quainton, England
- Class 25NC 3432: Stored at Mainline Steam, Auckland, New Zealand.
- Class 25NC 3437: Owned by Steamnet 2000, restored and steamed in April 2017.
- Class 25NC 3442: Operated by Rovos Rail, Capital Park, Pretoria.
- Class 25NC 3454: Ex condenser with dual Lempor exhaust, staged at Bloemfontein.
- Class 25NC 3484: Ex condenser, operated by Rovos Rail, Capital Park, Pretoria.
- Class 25NC 3508: Stored at Mainline Steam, Auckland, New Zealand.
- Class 25NC 3533: Ex condenser, operated by Rovos Rail, Capital Park, Pretoria.
- Class 26 3450: The Red Devil, staged at Monument Station, Cape Town.

Soviet Union

- P36-0001: Restored to working order at Roslavl in 2005. Currently displayed at Rizhsky Station, Moscow.
- P36-0027: Tikhoretsk for restoration to working order.
- P36-0031: Troitsk in working order.
- P36-0032: The only private steam locomotive operated in Russia, owned by GW Travel.
- P36-0050: Brest Railway Museum.
- P36-0058: Zlatoust derelict.
- P36-0064: Brest Railway Museum, Belarus Railways.
- P36-0071: Cosmetically restored and on display in Nizhny Novgorod.
- P36-0091: Skovorodino station.
- P36-0094: Belogorsk station.
- P36-0096: Severobaik station.
- P36-0097: Seyatel Station Museum.
- P36-0107: Park near Irkutsk.
- P36-0110: Mogzhon station.
- P36-0111: Orsha station, Belarus.
- P36-0120: Now restored to working order at Tikhoretsk. Returned to Moscow 03/09/13 for the '1520 Railway Exhibition' at Scherbinka. Currently based in Moscow.
- P36-0123: Prora Museum, Ruegen Island, Germany.
- P36-0124: Chernyshevsk depot.
- P36-0147: Sharya station.
- P36-0182: Cosmetically restored and on display in Chelyabinsk.
- P36-0192: Taiga station.
- P36-0218: Tikhoretsk/Bataysk, restored to working order.
- P36-0228: Uulan Baatar Railway Museum, Mongolia.
- P36-0232: Cosmetically restored at Zlatoust in 2009 for display in Samara. May display a different number.
- P36-0249: Shushary Railway Museum, St. Petersburg.
- P36-0250: Tashkent Railway Museum, Uzbekistan.
- P36-0251: Warsaw Station Museum, St. Petersburg.

Spain

- RENFE242F-2009: Retired in 1973, restored in 1989, and another time in 2005. Although in running order, it is usually on static display at the Museo del Ferrocarril, housed in the former Delicias Railway Station.
- Andorra, Escatrón & Samper de Calanda steam locomotives, retired in 1984. One is displayed in Casetas, Zaragoza, and the other two are displayed in Andorra, Teruel

United States

- Atchison, Topeka & Santa Fe 2903: On display at the Illinois Railway Museum in Union, Illinois.
- Atchison, Topeka & Santa Fe 2912: On static display in Pueblo, Colorado.
- Atchison, Topeka & Santa Fe 2913: On display in Fort Madison, Iowa.
- Atchison, Topeka & Santa Fe 2921: On display at the Amtrak Station in Modesto, California.
- Atchison, Topeka & Santa Fe 2925: On display at the California State Railroad Museum in Sacramento, California.
- Atchison, Topeka & Santa Fe 2926: Restored in 2021, owned by New Mexico Heritage Rail in Albuquerque at a site leased from the GSA near 8th Street and Haynes Avenue. More information at New Mexico Steam Locomotive and Railroad Historical Society.
- Atchison, Topeka & Santa Fe 3751: Restored in 1991, owned by the San Bernardino Railroad Historical Society, and is operated in excursion service. It is the oldest surviving 4-8-4, the first one to be built by the Baldwin Locomotive Works and the first 4-8-4 to be built for the Santa Fe.
- Atchison, Topeka & Santa Fe 3759: On Display in Kingman, Arizona.
- Atchison, Topeka & Santa Fe 3768: On display at the Great Plains Transportation Museum in Wichita, Kansas.
- Chesapeake and Ohio 614: Restored in 1980 and again in 1995, owned by RJD America, LLC. Undergoing restoration to operating condition at the Strasburg Rail Road.
- Chicago, Burlington and Quincy 5614: On display at Patee Park in St. Joseph, Missouri.
- Chicago, Burlington, and Quincy 5629: On display at the Colorado Railroad Museum in Golden, Colorado.
- Chicago, Burlington, and Quincy 5631: On display at Rotary Park in Sheridan, Wyoming.
- Chicago, Burlington, and Quincy 5633: On display at the Douglas Railroad Interpretive Center, Douglas, Wyoming.
- Grand Trunk Western 6323: On display at the Illinois Railway Museum in Union, Illinois.
- Grand Trunk Western 6325: Briefly operated on the Ohio Central Railroad, now on display at the Age of Steam Roundhouse in Sugarcreek, Ohio.
- Great Northern 2584: On display at the Havre depot in Havre, Montana.
- Milwaukee Road 261: Restored in 1993, owned, maintained, and operated by the Friends of the 261 in Minneapolis, Minnesota.
- Milwaukee Road 265: On display at the Illinois Railway Museum in Union, Illinois.
- Nashville, Chattanooga, and St. Louis 576, Nashville, Tennessee - Presently undergoing Restoration.
- Norfolk and Western 611: Ran frequent excursions in the 1980s and early 1990s, then placed on static display at the Virginia Museum of Transportation, Roanoke, Virginia. The second restoration to operational condition completed in mid 2015 at the North Carolina Transportation Museum, Spencer, North Carolina.
- Reading 2100: Restored in 1988 and 1998, converted to burn oil in the Early 2000s. On long-term lease to the American Steam Railroad. Currently under restoration to operating condition.
- Reading 2101: On display at the B&O Railroad Museum in Baltimore, Maryland.
- Reading 2102: Reading & Northern Railroad, Port Clinton, Pennsylvania, has been restored to operating condition in April 2022.
- Reading 2124: Used on the "Reading Rambles" in the late 1950s and 1960s. On display at Steamtown National Historic Site in Scranton, Pennsylvania.
- Cotton Belt 819: Built in 1942, it was the last locomotive built by the Cotton Belt and the last Cotton Belt steam locomotive built. Restored to service in 1986 and housed at the Arkansas Railroad Museum in Pine Bluff, Arkansas.
- St. Louis-San Francisco 4500: As the Frisco Meteor, ran overnight passenger service between St. Louis, Tulsa and Oklahoma City. Cosmetically restored and relocated in 2011 to the Route 66 Historical Village at 3770 Southwest Blvd in Tulsa, Oklahoma.
- St. Louis-San Francisco 4501: Built in 1942, ran overnight passenger service as the Frisco Meteor between St. Louis, Tulsa, and Oklahoma City. Donated to the Dallas Museum of the American Railroad in September 1964.
- St. Louis-San Francisco 4516: On display at the Missouri State Fairgrounds in Sedalia, Missouri.
- St. Louis-San Francisco 4524: On display at Grant Beach Park in Springfield, Missouri. This was the last steam locomotive built for the Frisco.
- Spokane, Portland and Seattle 700: Restored in 1990 by the Oregon Rail Heritage Foundation, and is operated in excursion service. No. 700 is stored at the Oregon Rail Heritage Center in Portland, Oregon, along with SP 4449. It is the only surviving original Spokane, Portland and Seattle railway steam locomotive.
- Southern Pacific 4449: Still in operation, served as the locomotive for the Bicentennial American Freedom Train. Stored at the Oregon Rail Heritage Center in Portland, Oregon along with SPS 700.
- Southern Pacific 4460: On display at the National Museum of Transportation in St. Louis, Missouri. This was the last steam locomotive used in revenue service by SP.
- Union Pacific 814: On display at the Rock Island Depot Museum in Council Bluffs, Iowa.
- Union Pacific 833: On display at the Utah State Railroad Museum in Ogden, Utah.
- Union Pacific 838: Union Pacific Railroad, stored in Cheyenne, Wyoming. Used solely as a source of spare parts for sister engine 844.
- Union Pacific 844: Formerly Union Pacific 8444, it is the last steam locomotive built for Union Pacific Railroad (12/1944). Part of UP heritage fleet, often used for running in excursion service, and on occasion revenue service. Never retired, it is the longest continuously operating steam locomotive on a Class I Railroad. Kept at Cheyenne, Wyoming, when not on excursion.
