= DRB Class 06 =

Class of German steam locomotives

DRB Class 06 DB Class 06
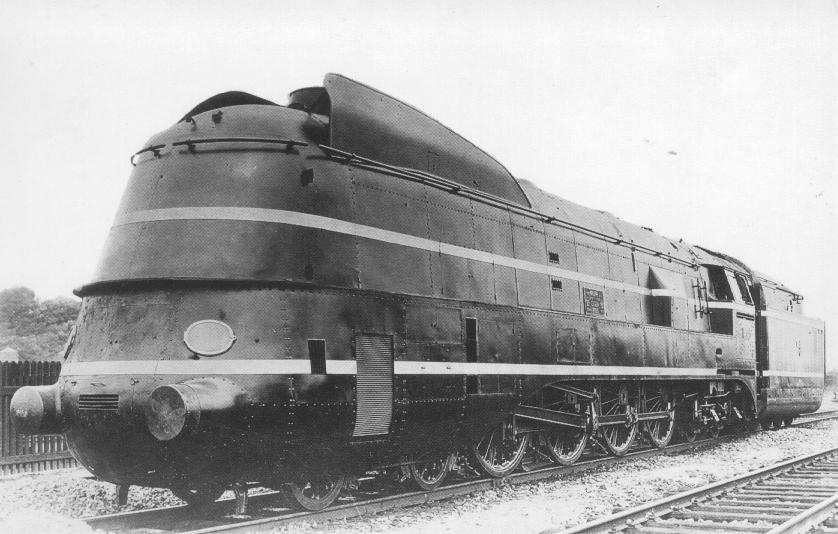
Type and origin
- Power type: Steam
- Builder: Krupp
- Serial number: 2000–2001
- Build date: 1939
- Total produced: 2
Specifications
- Configuration
  - Whyte: 4-8-4
  - UIC: 2′D2′ h3S
  - German: S 48.20 / 18
- Driver: Divided: inside cylinder to first coupled axle, outside to second
- Gauge: 1,435 mm (4 ft 8 1/2 in)
- Leading dia.: 1,000 mm (3 ft 3 3/8 in)
- Driver dia.: 2,000 mm (6 ft 6 3/4 in)
- Trailing dia.: 1,000 mm (3 ft 3 3/8 in)
- Tender wheels: 1,100 mm (3 ft 7 1/4 in)
- Wheelbase
  - Axle spacing (Asymmetrical): 2,200 mm (7 ft 2 5/8 in) +; 1,850 mm (6 ft 7/8 in) +; 2,250 mm (7 ft 4 5/8 in) +; 2,250 mm (7 ft 4 5/8 in) +; 2,250 mm (7 ft 4 5/8 in) +; 1,925 mm (6 ft 3 3/4 in) +; 1,800 mm (5 ft 10 7/8 in) =
  - Engine: 14,525 mm (47 ft 7 7/8 in)
  - Tender: 1,750 mm (5 ft 8 7/8 in) +; 1,500 mm (4 ft 11 in) +; 1,375 mm (4 ft 6 1/8 in) +; 1,375 mm (4 ft 6 1/8 in) =; 6,000 mm (19 ft 8 1/4 in)
  - incl. tender: 22,450 mm (73 ft 7 7/8 in)
- Length
  - Over headstocks: 25,220 mm (82 ft 8 7/8 in)
  - Over buffers: 26,520 mm (87 ft 1/8 in)
- Height: 4,550 mm (14 ft 11 1/8 in)
- Axle load: 20.0 t (19.7 long tons; 22.0 short tons)
- Adhesive weight: 80.0 t (78.7 long tons; 88.2 short tons)
- Empty weight: 129.8 t (127.8 long tons; 143.1 short tons)
- Service weight: 141.8 t (139.6 long tons; 156.3 short tons)
- Tender type: 2′3 T 38 St
- Fuel type: Coal
- Fuel capacity: 10 t (9.8 long tons; 11 short tons)
- Water cap.: 38 m^{3} (8,400 imp gal; 10,000 US gal)
- Firebox
  - Grate area: 5.04 m^{2} (54.3 sq ft)
- Boiler
  - Pitch: 3,060 mm (10 ft 1/2 in)
  - Tube plates: 7,500 mm (24 ft 7 1/4 in)
  - Small tubes: 83 mm (3 1/4 in), 72 off
  - Large tubes: 191 mm (7 1/2 in), 33 off
- Boiler pressure: 20 bar (20.4 kgf/cm^{2}; 290 psi)
- Heating surface
  - Firebox: 18.8 m^{2} (202 sq ft)
  - Tubes: 130.0 m^{2} (1,399 sq ft)
  - Flues: 140.2 m^{2} (1,509 sq ft)
  - Total surface: 289.0 m^{2} (3,111 sq ft)
- Superheater
  - Heating area: 132.5 m^{2} (1,426 sq ft)
- Cylinders: Three
- Cylinder size: 520 mm × 720 mm (20 1/2 in × 28 3/8 in)
- Valve gear: Heusinger (Walschaerts)
Performance figures
- Maximum speed: 140 km/h (87 mph)
- Indicated power: 2,800 PS (2,060 kW; 2,760 hp)
Career
- Operators: Deutsche Reichsbahn; Deutsche Bundesbahn
- Numbers: 06 001 – 06 002
- Retired: 1951
- Disposition: Both scrapped

The German DRB Class 06 engines were standard steam locomotives (Einheitsdampflokomotiven) with the Deutsche Reichsbahn (DRB) designed to haul express train services. They were the only German locomotives with a 4-8-4 (Northern) wheel arrangement.

== History ==
The two Class 06 locomotives built by the firm of Krupp in 1939 were the largest, heaviest and most powerful locomotives in the Deutsche Reichsbahn. They were built for heavy express train duties in hilly terrain. The performance requirement was for the transportation of 650 tons at 120 km/h (75 mph). On ramps of 1:100 it was still to be capable of maintaining 60 km/h (37 mph).

The Class 06 was given the same boiler as the Class 45 and many of the same components as the Class 41. The running gear, with four coupled axles, had a wheelbase of 6.75 m (22.1 ft)

In trials, the vehicles confirmed their remarkable capability and running qualities. However the locomotives tended to derail in tight turnout curves. And, like the Class 45s, the boilers developed cracks, leaky tubes and popped stay bolts, so that the locomotives were unconvincing when hauling measurement vehicles or scheduled trains.

As a result of the war no more were produced. After World War II a locomotive of this size was no longer needed, thus neither the necessary structural modification of the engines was carried out, nor did any follow-on orders result. Both engines were seen as having a faulty design and were retired by the Deutsche Bundesbahn in 1951 in Frankfurt am Main and scrapped, because the DB refused to replace their boilers.

The two locomotives, which had operating numbers 06 001 and 06 002, were equipped with 2'3 T 38 St tenders.

== See also ==
- List of DRG locomotives and railbuses
