= Santa Fe 3759 =

Preserved American Santa Fe 3751 class 4-8-4 locomotive

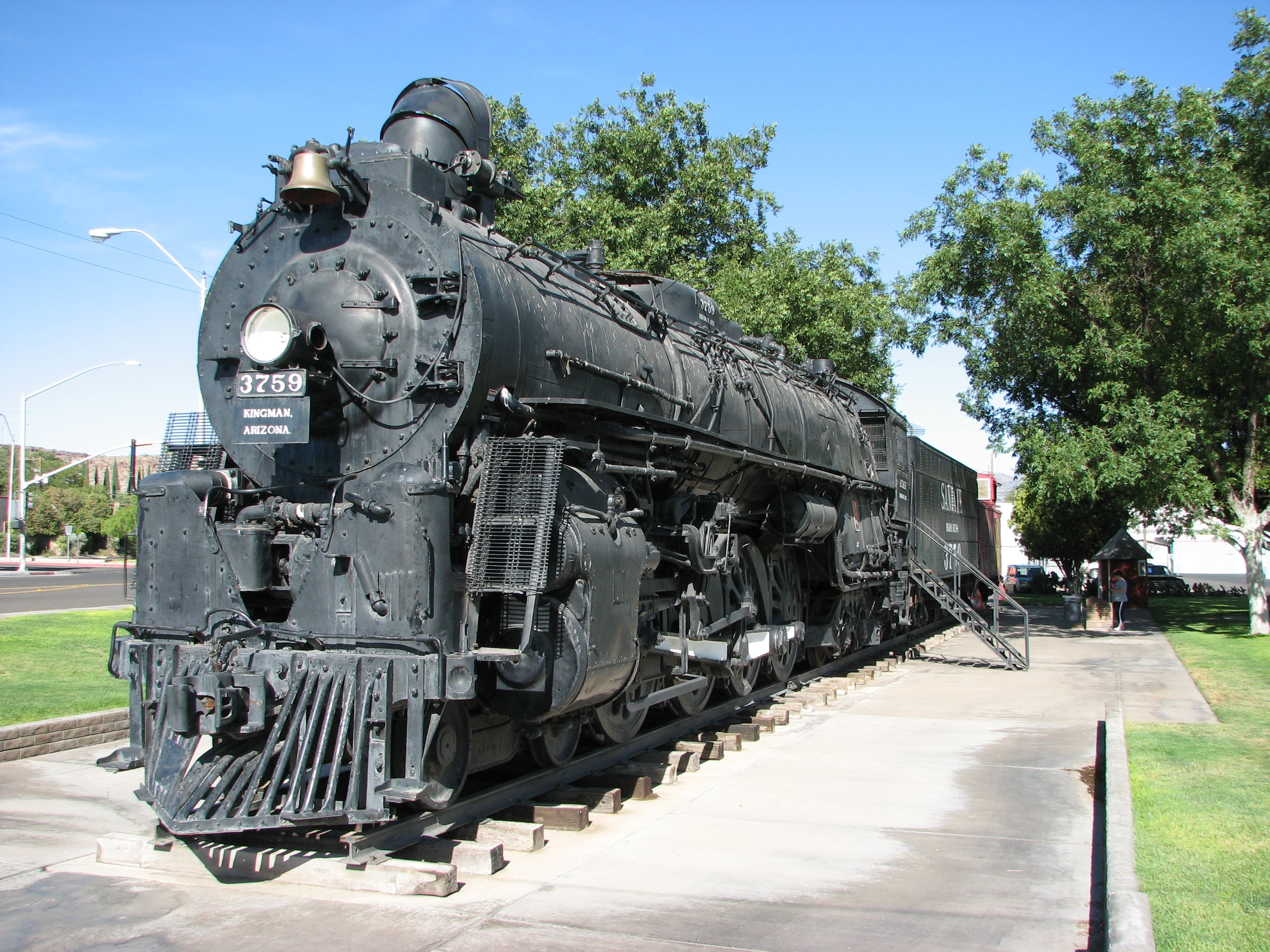
- Santa Fe No. 3759 on static display at Locomotive Park in 2007
Type and origin
- Power type: Steam
- Builder: Baldwin Locomotive Works
- Serial number: 60385
- Model: 16-54 1/4 E 9
- Build date: 1928
Specifications
- Configuration
  - Whyte: 4-8-4
  - UIC: 2′D2′ h2
- Gauge: 4 ft 8 1/2 in (1,435 mm)
- Driver dia.: New: 73 in (1.854 m); Rebuilt: 80 in (2.032 m)
- Fuel type: New: Coal; Now: Oil
- Boiler pressure: New: 210 lbf/in^{2} (1.45 MPa); Rebuilt: 230 lbf/in^{2} (1.59 MPa)
- Cylinders: Two, outside
- Cylinder size: 30 in × 30 in (762 mm × 762 mm)
- Valve gear: Walschaerts
- Valve type: Piston valves
- Loco brake: Air
- Train brakes: Air
- Couplers: Knuckle
Career
- Operators: Atchison, Topeka and Santa Fe Railway
- Class: 3751
- Numbers: ATSF 3759
- Retired: 1953 (revenue service); 1955 (excursion service)
- Preserved: 1957
- Restored: February 1955
- Current owner: The City of Kingman, Arizona
- Disposition: On static display
- AT & SF Locomotive
- U.S. National Register of Historic Places
- Location within Arizona Location within the United States
- Coordinates: 35°11′23″N 114°3′30″W
- MPS: Kingman MRA
- NRHP reference No.: 86001113
- Added to NRHP: May 14, 1986

Atchison, Topeka and Santa Fe 3759 is a 3751 class 4-8-4 "Northern" type steam locomotive, built in 1928 by the Baldwin Locomotive Works (BLW) for the Atchison, Topeka and Santa Fe Railway (ATSF). It is on display in Locomotive Park, located between Andy Devine Avenue and Beale Street in Kingman, Arizona. The park was established in August 1957 with AT&SF 3759 donated to the City of Kingman in recognition of Kingman's history with the railroad. The locomotive is termed a Mountain type on the nearby information plaque, and also in the city's descriptive material which is correct for the Santa Fe. ATSF 4-8-4s were referenced in documentation as type "Heavy Mountain", "New Mountain" or "Mountain 4-wheel trailer."

== History ==
No. 3759 was delivered in 1928 as a 3751 class "Heavy Mountain" 4-8-4 passenger locomotive. Originally a coal-burning locomotive with 73-inch drivers, the fleet was converted to oil in 1936 and rebuilt between 1938 and 1941 with 80-inch drivers. Its regular service was pulling passenger trains on the Santa Fe's main line through Kingman, which was a water stop. Retired in 1953, the engine had traveled over 2,585,000 miles.

In February 1955, No. 3759 was brought out of retirement at the request of the Railway Club of Southern California for a special excursion run, dubbed "Farewell to Steam." This special ran on February 6, a round trip between Los Angeles Union Station and Barstow, California with stops in Pasadena and San Bernardino and was the last Santa Fe revenue steam train to leave Los Angeles and to traverse Cajon Pass. After this trip, No. 3759 went back into storage, until Santa Fe donated the locomotive to the city of Kingman in 1957.

The locomotive was added to the National Register of Historic Places as AT & SF Locomotive in 1986, with reference number 86001113. It was evaluated for National Register listing as part of a 1985 study of 63 historic resources in Kingman that led to this and many others being listed.

In 1987, caboose 999520 was retired and donated to Kingman to be added behind 3759. The residents of Kingman pulled the locomotive forward 30 ft (9.1 m) to make room for the caboose.

In January 1991, Max Biegert, the owner of the Grand Canyon Railway (GCR), sent a letter to Kingman city officials of a proposal in leasing No. 3759 and donating one of GCR's own steam locomotives, No. 19, to the city in the 4-8-4's place. Biegert was interested in restoring No. 3759 for use on the Grand Canyon Railway and for an Orient Express-inspired run between Williams, Arizona and Los Angeles. The Kingman's community leaders reacted negatively to the proposal, and it quickly fell through.

== Surviving sister engines ==
- 3751 moved from Viaduct Park in San Bernardino, California in 1986 for restoration to operating condition, which was completed in 1991.
- 3768 is displayed at Great Plains Transportation Museum in Wichita, Kansas.
- 2903 is displayed at the Illinois Railway Museum in Union, Illinois.
- 2912 is displayed at the Pueblo Railway Museum in Pueblo, Colorado.
- 2913 is displayed at Riverview Park in Fort Madison, Iowa.
- 2921 is displayed at the Modesto Amtrak Station in Modesto, California.
- 2925 is displayed at the California State Railroad Museum in Sacramento, California.
- 2926 moved from Coronado Park in Albuquerque, New Mexico in 1999 to the New Mexico Steam Locomotive and Railroad Historical Society; then moved again for restoration to operating condition, which was completed in 2021.
