= Santa Fe 3751 =

Preserved American Santa Fe 3751 class 4-8-4 locomotive

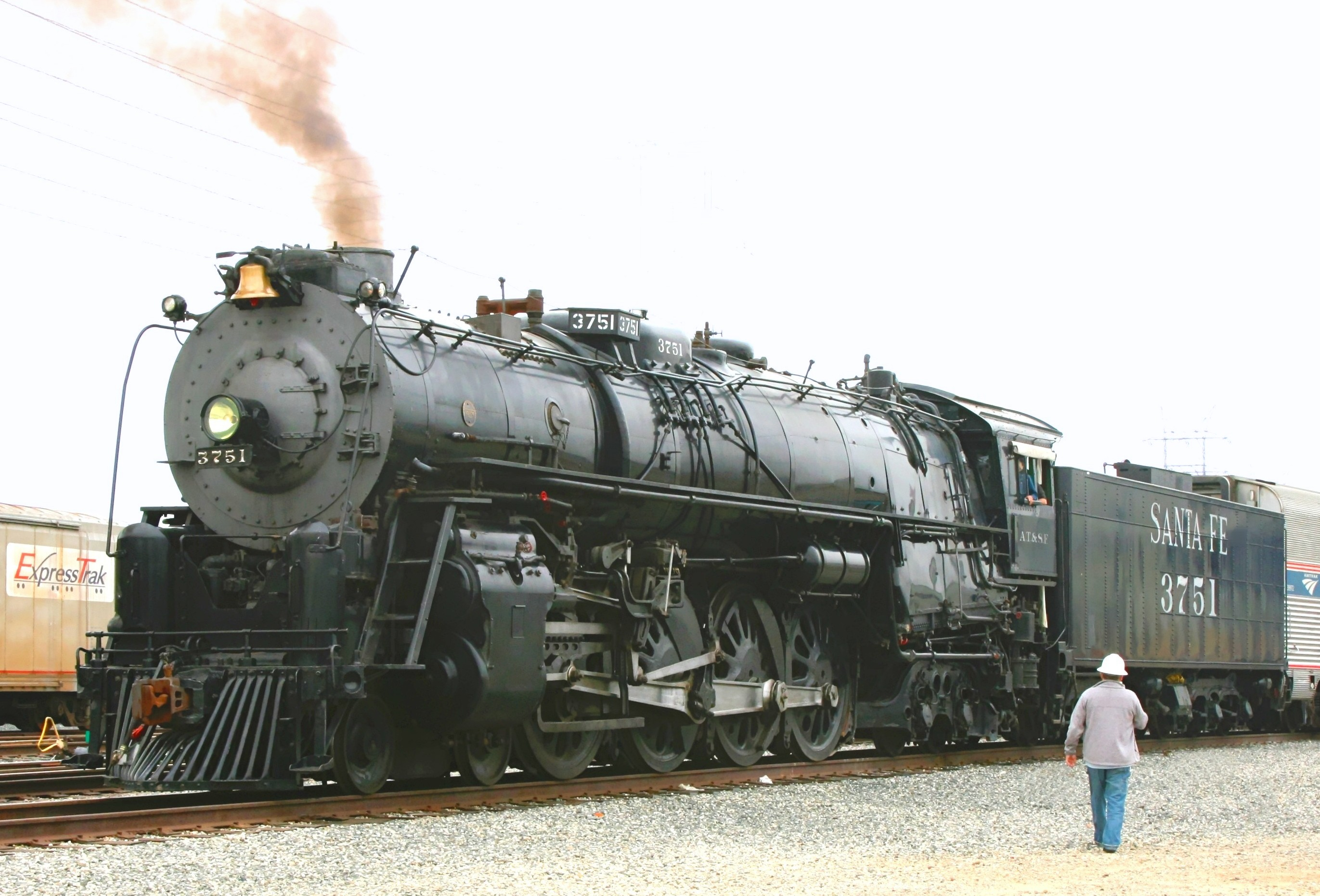
- No. 3751 preparing to leave the Amtrak L.A. maintenance yard on July 14, 2017
Type and origin
- Power type: Steam
- Builder: Baldwin Locomotive Works
- Serial number: 60004
- Model: 16-54 1/4 E
- Build date: May 1927
- Rebuild date: 1941
Specifications
- Configuration
  - Whyte: 4-8-4
  - UIC: 2′D2′ h2
- Gauge: 4 ft 8 1/2 in (1,435 mm) standard gauge
- Driver dia.: 80 in (2,032 mm) (Originally 73 in (1,900 mm)
- Axle load: 73,000 lb (33,100 kg) (Originally 70,500 lb (32,000 kg))
- Adhesive weight: 287,000 lb (130,000 kg) (Originally 270,000 lb (122,000 kg)
- Loco weight: 478,100 lb (216,900 kg)
- Tender weight: 396,246 lb (179,730 kg)
- Total weight: 874,346 lb (396,600 kg)
- Fuel type: New: Coal; Now: Oil
- Fuel capacity: 7,101 US gal (26,880 L; 5,913 imp gal)
- Water cap.: 20,000 US gal (76,000 L; 17,000 imp gal)
- Boiler pressure: 230 psi (1.59 MPa), originally 210 psi (1.45 MPa)
- Feedwater heater: Worthington Type 6-SA
- Cylinders: Two, outside
- Cylinder size: 30 in × 30 in (762 mm × 762 mm)
- Valve gear: Walschaerts
- Valve type: Piston valves
- Loco brake: Air
- Train brakes: Air
- Couplers: Knuckle
Performance figures
- Maximum speed: Over 100 mph (160 km/h)
- Power output: As built: 3,220 hp (2,400 kW)
- Tractive effort: 65,981 lbf (293.50 kN)
- Factor of adh.: 4.35
Career
- Operators: Atchison, Topeka & Santa Fe Railway; BNSF Railway; San Bernardino Railroad Historical Society
- Class: 3751
- Number in class: 1st of 14
- Numbers: ATSF 3751
- Retired: August 23, 1953
- Preserved: May 14, 1958
- Restored: August 13, 1991
- Current owner: San Bernardino Railroad Historical Society
- Disposition: Operational
- Atchison, Topeka and Santa Fe Railway Steam Locomotive No. 3751
- U.S. National Register of Historic Places
- Location within the Los Angeles metropolitan area Location within California Location within the United States
- Location: 2435 E. Washington Blvd., Los Angeles
- Coordinates: 34°1′9.10″N 118°13′31.7″W
- Built: 1927
- Architects: Atchison, Topeka and Santa Fe Railway; Baldwin Locomotive Works
- NRHP reference No.: 00001178
- Added to NRHP: October 4, 2000

Atchison, Topeka and Santa Fe 3751 is a preserved 3751 class 4-8-4 "Northern" type steam locomotive, built in May 1927 by the Baldwin Locomotive Works (BLW) in Eddystone (Philadelphia), Pennsylvania for the Atchison, Topeka & Santa Fe Railway (ATSF). No. 3751 was the first 4-8-4 steam locomotive built for the Santa Fe and was referenced in documentation as type: "Heavy Mountain", "New Mountain", or "Mountain 4-wheel trailer". No. 3751 served in passenger duties until being retired on August 23, 1953.

The locomotive was then placed on display in San Bernardino until it was restored to operating condition on August 13, 1991. It is currently located in the Central City East neighborhood of Los Angeles and has been listed on the National Register of Historic Places since October 4, 2000. It holds the distinction of being the oldest surviving 4-8-4 type steam locomotive in the world.

The locomotive is currently owned and operated by the San Bernardino Railroad Historical Society, which uses the locomotive to haul occasional mainline excursion trains. However, a federally mandated 15-year inspection put it out of service in 2017. No. 3751's overhaul was completed in September 2022, and it returned to service that month.

== History ==
=== Revenue service ===
No. 3751 was built in May 1927 by the Baldwin Locomotive Works (BLW), No. 3751 was BLW's and the Santa Fe Railway's first 4-8-4 type, costing $99,712.77. Tests showed that the new locomotive was 20% more efficient and powerful than the 3700 class 4-8-2 Mountain types, which at the time were Santa Fe's most advanced steam locomotives. Santa Fe adopted the terminology "Heavy Mountain", "New Mountain", or "Mountain 4-wheel trailer" as notation for this new 4-8-4 type and continued the numbering sequence of the 3700 class Mountains by numbering the first 4-8-4 3751.

In May 1936, the locomotive was converted to burn oil and was given a larger tender that holds 20,000 US gallons (76,000 L; 17,000 imp gal) of water and 7,107 US gallons (26,900 L; 5,918 imp gal) of fuel oil two years later. No. 3751 was also present at the grand opening of Union Passenger Terminal in Los Angeles on May 7, 1939, pulling the Scout, one of Santa Fe's crack passenger trains as it arrived from Chicago. It was the first steam locomotive to bring a passenger train into the new Union Passenger Terminal.

In 1941, No. 3751, along with the other 13 locomotives in its class, received major upgrades that included: replacing the original 73-inch (1.9 m) spoked driving wheels with 80-inch (2.0 m) boxpok wheels, a new frame, Timken roller bearings on all axles, and more.

That same year, it achieved its highest recorded speed at 103 miles per hour (166 km/h). It continued to be a very reliable working locomotive until August 23, 1953, when it pulled the last regularly scheduled steam-powered passenger train on the Santa Fe to run between Los Angeles and San Diego; this was its last run in revenue service, it was retired and put into storage at the Redondo Junction roundhouse. On May 14, 1958, it was placed on display in San Bernardino.

=== Restoration ===
In 1981, the San Bernardino Railroad Historical Society was formed with intentions of restoring and operating No. 3751. Four years later, it achieved its goal when 3751 was sold to it for one cent with the condition that the SBRHS must restore and operate the locomotive. In 1986, No. 3751 was moved from its display to California Steel Industries, where it was restored at a cost of $1.5 million. On August 13, 1991, it moved under its own steam for the first time in thirty-eight years. It made its first excursion run on December 27, 1991, running with two Santa Fe EMD FP45s and 16 passenger cars on a four-day trip from Los Angeles via Barstow to Bakersfield. Since then, it has been utilized for a large number of excursions and special trips, and for display at many events.

=== Excursion service ===
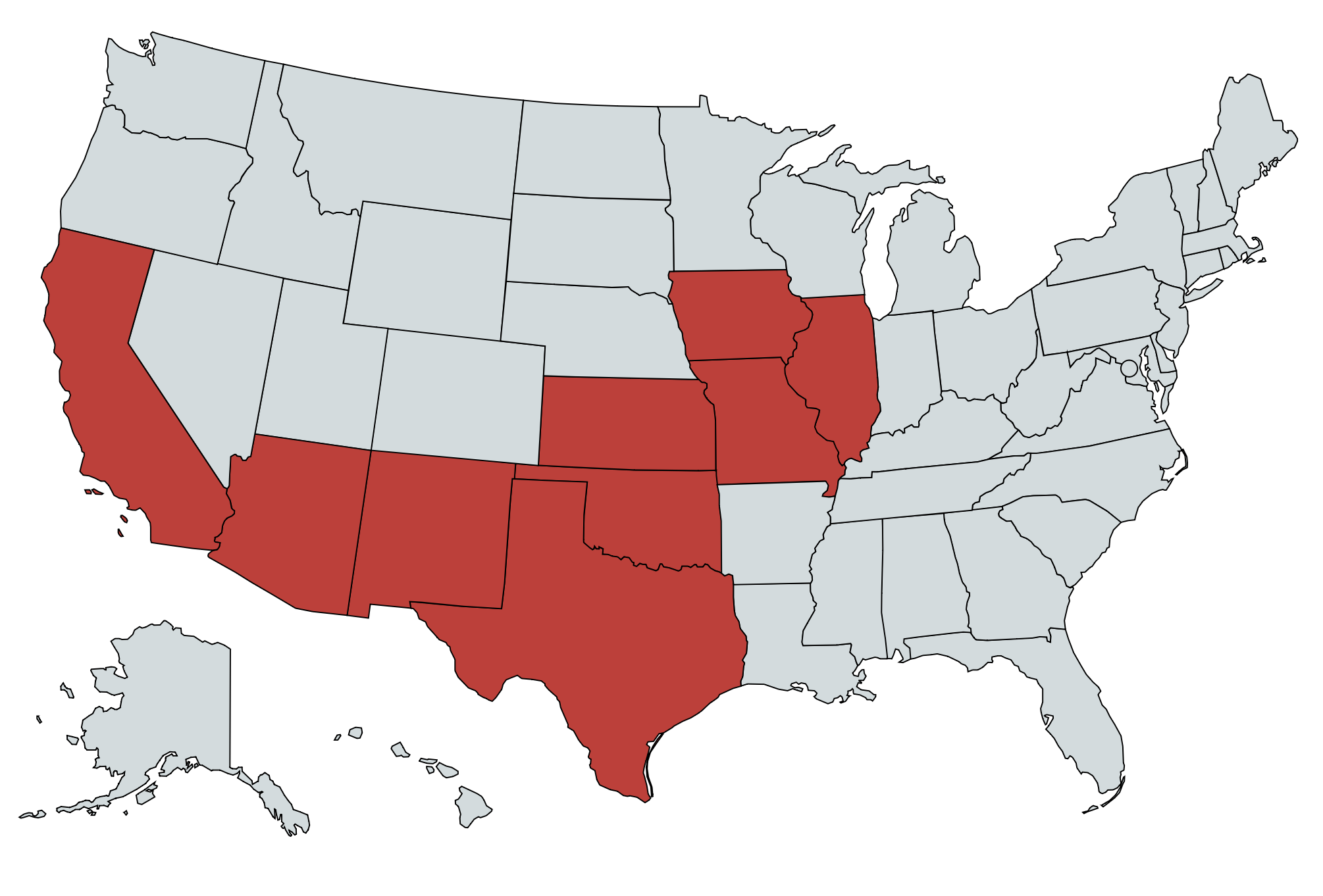
US states visited by No. 3751 in excursion service

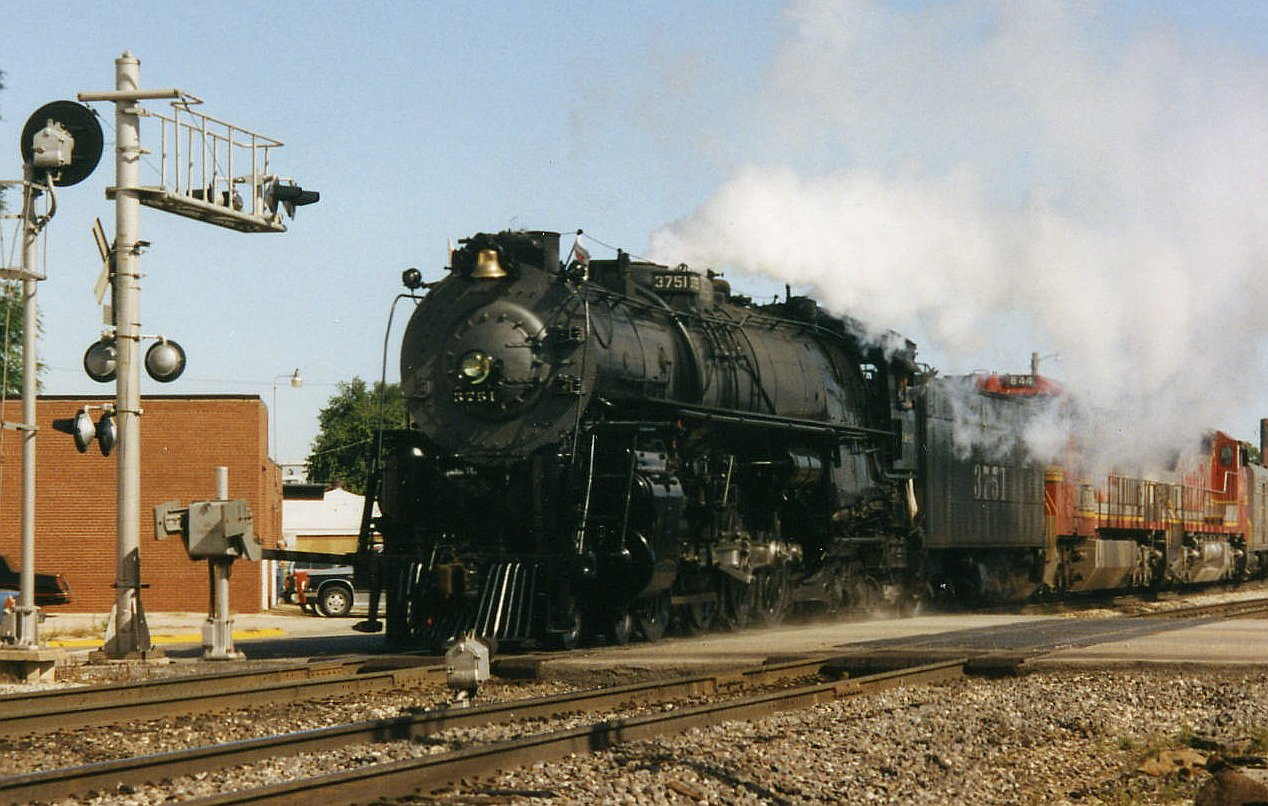
ATSF No. 3751 leads an employee special train westbound through Streator, Illinois in 1992

In August 1992, No. 3751 was found on its largest assignment so far, as the engine ran the entire route of Santa Fe's Transcon route between Los Angeles and Chicago with three (and later two) Santa Fe GE Dash 8-40CWs. The engine spent 18 days traveling over 2,300 miles (3,700 km) in both directions. This run would include travelling to Topeka, Kansas to attend that year's Topeka Railroad days, where the locomotive was briefly displayed near Union Pacific 4-6-6-4 No. 3985.

On April 22–23, 1995, No. 3751 was displayed in the Riverside Sunkist Orange Blossom Festival in Riverside. On December 31, 1996 when Atchison, Topeka & Santa Fe merged with Burlington Northern Railroad to form Burlington Northern Santa Fe (BNSF), the locomotive retained the same number. The excursion was operated again on April 20–21, 1996.

In June of 1999, the locomotive participated in Railfair '99. On the way to the fair, No. 3751 along with a BNSF GE Dash 9-44CW and mixed train of a tool car, nine then later eight BNSF boxcars and two passenger cars, from Los Angeles to Sacramento via San Bernardino, Barstow, Bakersfield, and Stockton. On the return trip to Los Angeles, No. 3751 pulled another mixed train with eight covered hopper cars.

In October of 2000, No. 3751 was listed on the National Register of Historic Places.

In August of 2002, No. 3751 operated an Amtrak excursion train from Los Angeles to Williams, Arizona to participate in the 2002 National Railway Historical Society (NRHS) Convention. The excursion ran over Metrolink, BNSF, and Arizona and California Railroad tracks. After arriving in Williams, the locomotive pulled some excursions and photo run-bys on the Grand Canyon Railway (GCR) between Williams and the Grand Canyon Village, including a doubleheader with GCR 2-8-2 No. 4960 and a tripleheader with GCR 2-8-0 No. 18. No. 3751 also pulled some of GCR's Pullman passenger cars for a photo charter requested by Goodheart Productions.

In 2008, No. 3751 ran on the Surfline route for two excursions from Los Angeles to San Diego. The first on June 1 was a public excursion. The excursion made the locomotive the first steam locomotive to run on the Surf Line since the 1976 American Freedom Train, it was also the first steam powered passenger train to make the run between Los Angeles and San Diego since 3751 last traveled the line in 1953. The train was turned at Miramar Wye, 15 miles north of San Diego station. The second excursion was a private car special on September 21.

In May of 2010, the locomotive returned to the Surf Line for a third excursion from Los Angeles to San Diego, pulling eight Amtrak cars and a few dome cars, attracting large crowds. In order to alleviate issues with turning the train, the excursion was split over two days: south to San Diego on May 1, and north to Los Angeles the following day. This proved successful, as 3751 was on time into San Diego the first day and sustained only normal delays northbound, thus proving the excursion to be the most successful yet. The weekend after the trip to San Diego saw the engine in San Bernardino for National Train Day and the 2010 San Bernardino Railroad Days festival. It has made annual runs to San Bernardino for the Railroad Days Festival in April or May since the initial trip.

In May 2012, No. 3751 powered a six-day excursion from Los Angeles to Williams, Arizona, as part of the centennial celebrations of Arizona's statehood. As part of the excursion, another special round-trip doubleheader to the Grand Canyon and back was run with 3751 and GCR 4960. The train also operated over the Arizona & California Railroad on the way to Williams and on the return trip to Los Angeles. Three weeks before the trip to Arizona, the engine also made the trip east to attend the San Bernardino Railroad Days Festival for the third year in a row.

In May of 2013, No. 3751 ran on a fourth trip to the San Bernardino Railroad Days Festival.

In May 2015, No. 3751 made an appearance at Fullerton Railroad Days 2015 in Fullerton, California, making it the first time since 2008 to appear at this event. On July 15, 2017, it traveled to Union Station to participate in Summer Train Fest 2017 before being taken out of service to undergo its mandated Federal Railroad Administration (FRA) 1,472-day inspection and overhaul. No. 3751's overhaul was estimated to be completed in 2021, and on August 10 of that same year, No. 3751 was test fired right before the 30th anniversary of the locomotives' first return to steam, as well as the 40th anniversary of the SBRHS.

In March-April 2022, No. 3751 was equipped with the new Positive train control (PTC) system. On September 24 and 25, 2022, No. 3751 participated in the Amtrak Track Safety community event at the Fullerton Transportation Center.

== Surviving sister engines ==
- 3759 is displayed at Locomotive Park in Kingman, Arizona.
- 3768 is displayed at Great Plains Transportation Museum in Wichita, Kansas.
- 2903 is displayed at the Illinois Railway Museum in Union, Illinois.
- 2912 is displayed at the Pueblo Railway Museum in Pueblo, Colorado.
- 2913 is displayed at Riverview Park in Fort Madison, Iowa.
- 2921 is displayed at the Modesto Amtrak Station in Modesto, California.
- 2925 is displayed at the California State Railroad Museum in Sacramento, California.
- 2926 moved from Coronado Park in Albuquerque, New Mexico in 1999 to the New Mexico Heritage Rail; then moved again for restoration to operating condition, which was completed in 2021.

== Historic designations ==
- National Register of Historic Places #NPS–#00001178

== See also ==
- List of Registered Historic Places in Los Angeles
- Santa Fe 1316
- Santa Fe 3415
- Grand Canyon Railway 29
- Southern Pacific 2479
- Southern Pacific 4449
- Union Pacific 844
