= Santa Fe 1010 =

Preserved Santa Fe class 1000 2-6-2 locomotive

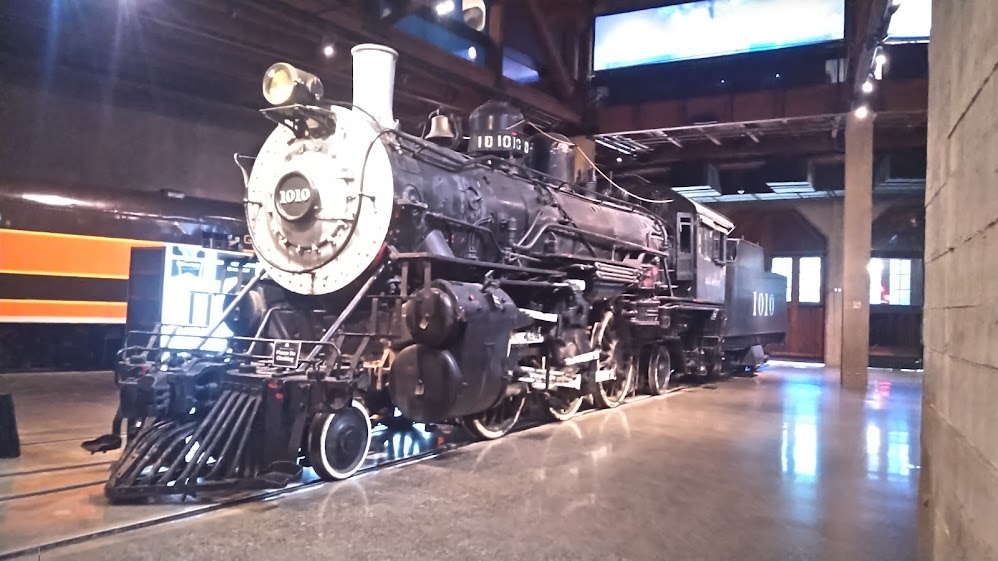
- Santa Fe 1010 on display inside the California State Railroad Museum roundhouse, June 22, 2024
Type and origin
- Power type: Steam
- Builder: Baldwin Locomotive Works
- Serial number: 19630
- Build date: October 1901
Specifications
- Configuration
  - Whyte: 2-6-2
  - UIC: 1'C1
- Gauge: 4’ 8 1/2”
- Driver dia.: New: 79 in (2,000 mm); Now: 69 in (1,800 mm)
- Wheelbase: 69.48 ft (21.18 m)
  - Engine: 32.17 ft (9.81 m)
  - Drivers: 13.67 ft (4.17 m)
- Adhesive weight: New: 144,610 lb (65,590 kg); Now: 167,500 lb (76,000 kg)
- Loco weight: New: 209,220 lb (94,900 kg); Now: 235,200 lb (106,700 kg)
- Tender weight: New: 118,000 lb (54,000 kg); Now: 175,000 lb (79,000 kg)
- Total weight: New: 327,220 lb (148,420 kg); Now: 410,200 lb (186,100 kg)
- Fuel type: New: Coal; Now: Oil
- Fuel capacity: Coal: 10 t (9.8 long tons; 11 short tons); Oil: 3,300 US gal (12,000 L; 2,700 imp gal)
- Water cap.: New: 6,000 US gal (23,000 L; 5,000 imp gal); Now: 9,900 US gal (37,000 L; 8,200 imp gal)
- Firebox
  - Grate area: 53.70 sq ft (4.989 m^{2})
- Boiler pressure: 200 psi (1,400 kPa)
- Heating surface
  - Firebox: 246 sq ft (22.9 m^{2})
- Cylinders: New: four Now: two, outside
- Cylinder size: Now: 23.5 in × 28 in (600 mm × 710 mm)
- High-pressure cylinder: New: 17 in × 28 in (430 mm × 710 mm)
- Low-pressure cylinder: New: 28 in × 28 in (710 mm × 710 mm)
- Valve gear: Walschaerts
- Valve type: Piston valves
- Loco brake: Air
- Train brakes: Air
- Couplers: Knuckle
Performance figures
- Tractive effort: New: 25,446 lbf (113,190 N); Now: 37,553 lbf (167,040 N)
- Factor of adh.: New: 5.68; Now: 4.46
Career
- Operators: Atchison, Topeka and Santa Fe Railway
- Class: 1000 class
- Numbers: ATSF 1010
- Retired: February 1955
- Current owner: California State Railroad Museum
- Disposition: On static display, awaiting to be restored to operating condition

Atchison, Topeka and Santa Fe Railway 1010 is a 2-6-2 "Prairie" type steam locomotive built by the Baldwin Locomotive Works (BLW) in 1901 for Atchison, Topeka and Santa Fe Railway (ATSF). It started out as a Vauclain compound locomotive before it was rebuilt into a conventional locomotive in the 1910s. It was primarily used for various passenger trains across the Southwestern United States, including the record breaking 1905 Scott Special on the segment between Needles, California, and Seligman, Arizona, before it was reassigned to freight service in the 1940s. It was retired in 1955 and was kept by the Santa Fe for several years for preservation purposes. In 1979, Santa Fe donated No. 1010 to the California State Railroad Museum (CSRM), where the locomotive resides there in Sacramento as of 2025.

== History ==
=== Revenue service ===
No. 1010 was the eleventh member of the Atchison, Topeka and Santa Fe Railway's (ATSF) 1000 class, being built and delivered by the Baldwin Locomotive Works of Philadelphia, Pennsylvania in October 1901. The 1000 class was a series of 2-6-2 "Prairie" type locomotives, and although most other American-built 2-6-2s had an average driver diameter of 45 to 50 inches and were designed to pull short-distance freight trains, the 1000 class locomotives had a driver diameter of 79 inches and were designed to pull mainline passenger trains. No. 1010 was initially constructed as a Vauclain compound locomotive with four cylinders, since this design had proven to be popular with various class 1 railroads. The 1000 class locomotives often ran over the 3% grades between Trinidad, Colorado and Raton, New Mexico, which was part of the La Junta-Albuquerque route.

In 1905, No. 1010 became famous for taking part in the record-breaking Scott Special train from Los Angeles, California to Chicago, Illinois, and No. 1010 pulled the train from Needles, California to Seligman, Arizona. As the popularity of Vauclain compound locomotives declined in the 1910s, the Santa Fe rebuilt their 2-6-2s with conventional cylinders, 69 inch diameter driving wheels, oil tenders, and superheaters to decrease operation costs. No. 1010 was subsequently reassigned to secondary commuter trains, since 4-6-2 "Pacific" types and 4-8-2 "Mountain" types had taken over mainline passenger service on the Santa Fe. By the end of the 1930s, No. 1010 became solely used in pulling short freight trains, and it had completed its final freight assignment in the Slaton Division in Texas in the early 1950s.

=== Preservation ===
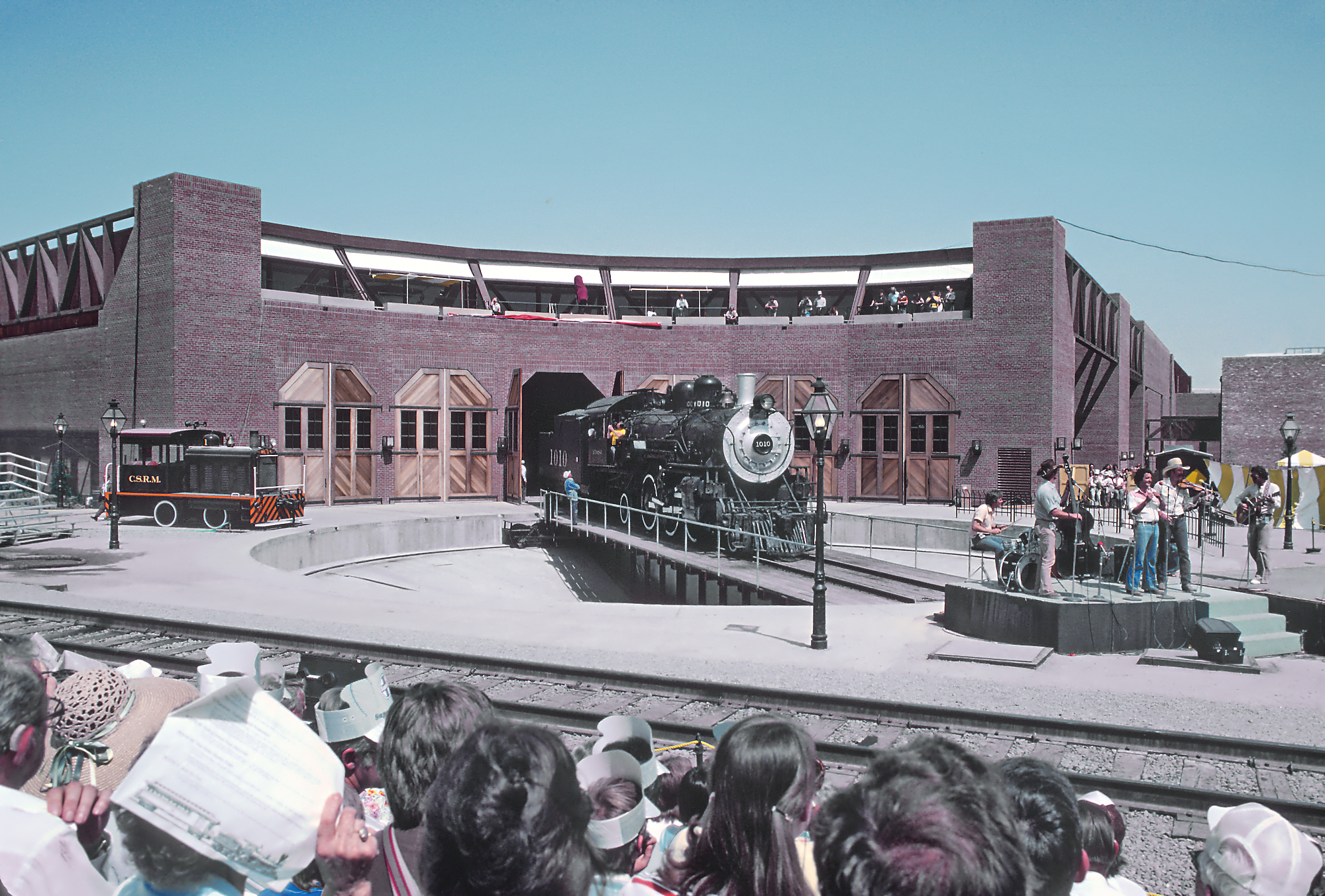
Santa Fe 1010 on display at the First Sacramento Rail Fair outside the California State Railroad Museum in May 1981

Since the locomotive became the last remaining locomotive to have taken part in the Scott Special, the Santa Fe chose to withhold No. 1010 for preservation. For the next decade, the Santa Fe used No. 1010 to take part multiple special events and television programs, including a "Railroad Day" event at South Pasadena in April 1958, and one 1964 General Electric commercial where the locomotive was painted bright red. By the early 1970s, the Santa Fe had put No. 1010 in storage on the garden tracks at the Redondo Junction roundhouse in Los Angeles along with a few other steam locomotives they had withheld from scrapping, including 0-4-0 No. 5. In 1974, Numbers 1010 and 5 were towed eastbound to Albuquerque for storage in the company roundhouse there. The Santa Fe had developed plans to construct their own vintage railroad museum within the city limits of Albuquerque, since they still owned some vintage steam and diesel locomotives to be preserved, but those plans never came to full fruition.

In May 1981, No. 1010 participated in the grand opening of the California State Railroad Museum (CSRM) in Sacramento, California, where it performed during the music number Song of the Iron Horse and ran back and fourth from the roundhouse, running under compressed air.

In October 1984, the Santa Fe officially donated Numbers 1010 and 5, along with most of their other remaining vintage locomotives, to the CSRM. No. 1010 has since remained on occasional display inside the museum's main hall. At some point in the 1990s, the CSRM moved the locomotive to their locomotive facility next to the Sacramento yard for storage, and they slowly maintained No. 1010 in the process. On May 18, 2018, No. 1010 was brought out of storage and moved back inside the CSRM's main hall for a limited time exhibit dubbed the "Death Valley Scotty’s Race for Glory" as another commemoration for the Scott Special.

=== Restoration ===
In October 2023, the CSRM announced that No. 1010 will be fully restored to operating condition, although the locomotive can currently be run short distances using compressed air. Fundraising is underway.

== Film history ==
- In 1955, No. 1010 was fired up by the Santa Fe for the final time for a television re-enactment of the Scott Special for the "Death Valley Days" program featuring the special train, in season 3 - episode 16 - “Death Valley Scotty”. This locomotive was also prominently featured in a 1958 episode of the TV series Sky King, entitled "Stop That Train". Also used in the 1957 “Code 3” episode 35 “Lonesome Whistles”.
