= Scott Special =

One-off LA to Chicago express train

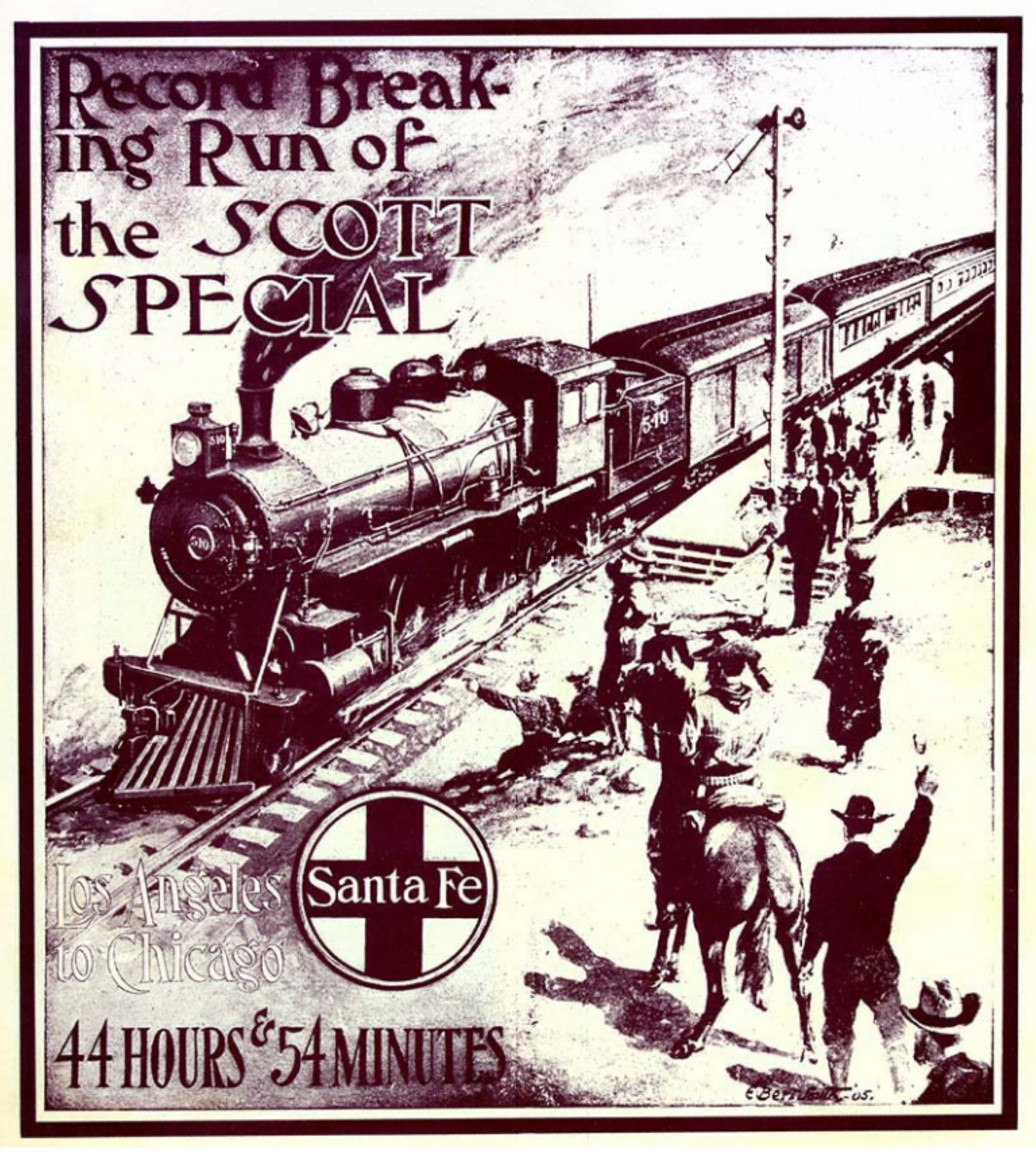
The cover of a booklet released by the railway to commemorate the Scott Special. Theodore Roosevelt is depicted on a horse, though he did not witness the event.

The Scott Special, also known as the Coyote Special, the Death Valley Coyote or the Death Valley Scotty Special, was a one-time, record-breaking passenger train operated by the Atchison, Topeka and Santa Fe Railway (Santa Fe) from Los Angeles, California, to Chicago, Illinois, at the request of Walter E. Scott, known as "Death Valley Scotty". At the time of its transit in 1905, the Scott Special made the 2,265-mile (3,645 km) trip between the two cities at the fastest speed recorded to date; in doing so, it established the Santa Fe as the leader in high-speed travel between Chicago and the West Coast. The Scott Special made the trip in 44 hours and 54 minutes breaking the previous records, set in 1900 by the Peacock Special, by 13 hours and 2 minutes, and in 1903 by the Lowe Special, by 7 hours and 55 minutes. Santa Fe's regular passenger service from Los Angeles to Chicago at the time was handled on a 2½-day schedule by the California Limited. It was not until the 1936 introduction of the Super Chief that Santa Fe trains would regularly exceed the speeds seen on the Scott Special.

== Background ==
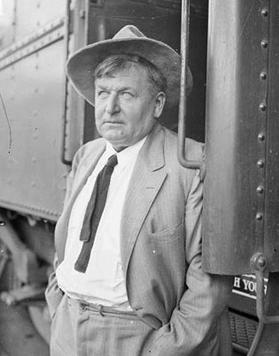
Walter Scott, aka "Death Valley Scotty" and a train in Chicago in 1926. Photo from the Chicago Daily News negatives collection, DN-0003451. Courtesy of the Chicago Historical Society.

Death Valley Scotty (September 20, 1872 – January 5, 1954) had used some ore samples that he collected near Cripple Creek, Colorado, as a ruse to convince some bankers in 1902 that he had a claim on a high-grade ore mine in Death Valley. By 1905 he had conned the banks out of nearly $10,000, equal to $358,333 today. Another con he ran in 1905 earned Scott an additional $4,000. It was then that he met E. Burdon Gaylord, the owner of the Big Bell mine. Gaylord needed a flashy way to promote his mine and Scott sought the money behind the mine; the two formed a partnership in which Gaylord would finance Scott and Scott would promote the mine like no other.

After a few high-priced and newsworthy train trips around the southwest, Scott met with the Santa Fe's General Passenger Agent, J. J. Byrne, at the railroad's office in Los Angeles on July 8, 1905. Once Scott (who had already travelled cross-country on the Santa Fe some thirty-two times) got in to talk to Byrne, the arrangements were made, thanks to a deposit from Scott of $5,500 in cash. The two agreed on a 46-hour schedule from Los Angeles to Chicago that would begin the following day.

The passenger list for the train was a mere four people: Scott himself, his wife, F. N. Holman, and Charles E. Van Loan, a writer for the Los Angeles Examiner (and one who was adept at helping Scotty create his "miner" persona, inflating the amounts Scotty really spent while "promoting" his "mine"). The schedule involved operating a three car train across the system, led by no less than 19 different locomotives. The engineers of these locomotives came to be known as the "Nervy Nineteen".

== Equipment used ==
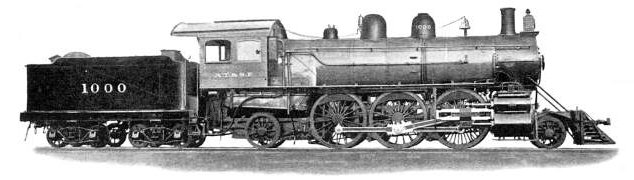
Builder's photo (1901) of Santa Fe #1000, which was used on the Winslow-Gallup section of the Scott Special

The special train consisted of three passenger cars pulled by one locomotive. The three cars used were baggage car #210, dining car #1407, and Pullman Muskegon. Altogether, the three cars weighed a total of 170 short tons (155 metric tons). While the three cars remained constant throughout the run of the Scott Special, the locomotive did not. In order to prevent delays on the trip as the train would need to stop for water and fuel, nineteen locomotives were prepared along the route so that as one reached the end of its supplies, it would relay the three cars off to the next fully fueled and ready locomotive to continue the run. For the more strenuous grades over Cajon Pass in California and Raton Pass in New Mexico and Colorado, helpers were added to get the train up and over the summits. At various points throughout the run, problems such as hotboxes did occur, or in one instance a complete mechanical failure of the locomotive, but in each case, the train's crew was able to get the train to the next relay point, and they usually arrived ahead of schedule.

Locomotives and crews for the Scott Special
Section	Distance	Average speed	Time	Locomotive number	Wheel arrangement (Whyte notation)	Engineer	Fireman
Los Angeles - Barstow, California	141.1 miles (227.1 km)	48.5 miles per hour (78 km/h)	2 hours 55 minutes	442	4-6-0	John Finlay	C. B. Ashbaugh
Barstow - Needles, California	169.3 miles (272.5 km)	51 mph (82.1 km/h)	3 h 19 m	1005	2-6-2	Thomas E. Gallagher	E. D. Nettleton
Needles - Seligman, Arizona	148.9 miles (239.6 km)	42.4 mph (68.2 km/h)	3 h 31 m	1010	2-6-2	Fred W. Jackson	H. Nelson
Seligman - Williams, Arizona	50.8 miles (81.8 km)	34.4 mph (55.4 km/h)	1 h 29 m	1016	2-6-2	Charles Wood	R. Edgar
Williams - Winslow, Arizona	92.2 miles (148.4 km)	42.1 mph (67.8 km/h)	2 h 11 m	485	4-6-0	D. A. Lenhart	W. P. Sugurue
Winslow - Gallup, New Mexico	128 miles (206 km)	49.4 mph (79.5 km/h)	2 h 35 m	1000	2-6-2	John F. Briscoe	B. F. Chambers
Gallup - Albuquerque	157.8 miles (254.0 km)	49.4 mph (79.5 km/h)	3 h 12 m	478	4-6-0	Henry J. Rehder	F. Brown
Albuquerque - Las Vegas	132.2 miles (212.8 km)	44 mph (70.8 km/h)	3 h 0 m	1211	4-6-2	Edward Sears	G. A. Bryan
Las Vegas - Raton	110.8 miles (178.3 km)	50.5 mph (81.3 km/h)	2 h 12 m	1208	4-6-2	George A. Norman	E. Chrystal
Raton - La Junta, Colorado	104.5 miles (168.2 km)	46.2 mph (74.4 km/h)	2 h 17 m	1215	4-6-2	Hudson A. Gardner	R. P. Hinze
La Junta - Syracuse	100.8 miles (162.2 km)	63.7 mph (102.5 km/h)	1 h 35 m	536	4-4-2	David Lesher	William McClerkin
Syracuse - Dodge City	101.6 miles (163.5 km)	62.2 mph (100.1 km/h)	1 h 38 m	531	4-4-2	H. G. Simmons	G. Davis
Dodge City - Kent	153.4 miles (246.9 km)	57.9 mph (93.2 km/h)	2 h 39 m	530	4-4-2	Edward Norton	C. L. Gray
Kent - Newton	153.4 miles (246.9 km)	57.9 mph (93.2 km/h)	2 h 39 m	1095	2-6-2	Oliver W. Halsey	C. L. Gray
Newton - Emporia	73.1 miles (117.6 km)	62.6 mph (100.7 km/h)	1 h 10 m	526	4-4-2	Hadley R. Rossetter	Andy Fairchild
Emporia - Argentine	120.2 miles (193.4 km)	57.3 mph (92.2 km/h)	2 h 10 m	524	4-4-2	Josiah Gossard	H. H. Hill
Argentine - Marceline	108 miles (174 km)	54 mph (86.9 km/h)	2 h 1 m	547	4-4-2	A. F. Bauer	Robert Shirk
Marceline - Shopton	112.8 miles (181.5 km)	55 mph (88.5 km/h)	2 h 3 m	542	4-4-2	Richard Jones	J. J. O'Connor
Shopton - Chillicothe	104.7 miles (168.5 km)	62.3 mph (100.3 km/h)	1 h 41 m	510	4-4-2	Charles Losee	W. M. Schlosser
Chillicothe - Chicago	134.3 miles (216.1 km)	61 mph (98.2 km/h)	2 h 12 m	517	4-4-2	Charles Losee	W. M. Schlosser

== Route and timing ==
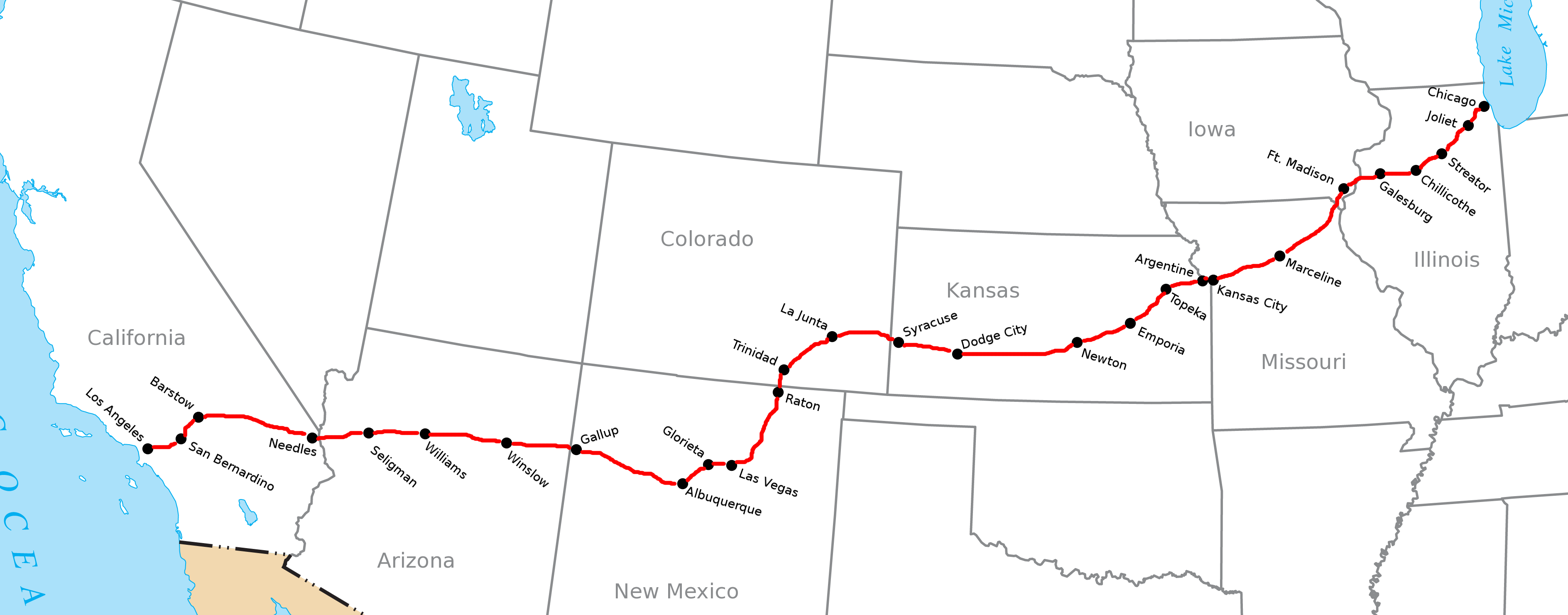
Route of the Scott Special from Los Angeles, California, to Chicago, Illinois.

The special departed from Santa Fe's La Grande Station in Los Angeles at 1:00 pm Pacific Time on July 9, 1905. The locomotive and three cars left the station and the cheering crowds, estimated at 20,000 people, and began its run eastward. The number of people at La Grande Station is remarkable in itself since the train's schedule was planned only one day before the event; the Santa Fe used the train as an opportunity to publicize itself and got the word out to news agencies across the railroad's territory.

In rail transport terminology, the Scott Special operated as an "extra" train. Normally such trains are not allowed any special considerations for schedule and are switched into sidings to clear the main line for the railroad's regularly scheduled trains. For this run, however, the special was afforded rights over all of the railroad's regular trains; all other trains were required to clear the main line no less than one hour before the special was scheduled to pass. As most of the Santa Fe was still a single-track railroad, this meant that quite a few regular trains were put into sidings to wait for the special. This accommodation, along with the numerous locomotive changes en route helped to ensure that the train would arrive in Chicago within the 46-hour schedule.

The first locomotive and crew change occurred in Barstow after the train had passed through Cajon Pass. At one point after passing Cajon summit, the train was clocked at 96 mph (155 km/h). The locomotive and crew were again changed successively at Needles, Seligman, Williams, Winslow and Gallup before the train arrived in Albuquerque, New Mexico, at 9:30 am on July 10.

To cross Raton Pass, locomotives and crews were changed at Las Vegas, Raton and La Junta. From La Junta, the train was powered by a succession of 4-4-2 type locomotives that were swapped across the plains in the Kansas cities of Syracuse, Dodge City, Newton, Emporia, and Argentine and Marceline, Missouri, to the Mississippi River crossing at Shopton, Iowa, near Fort Madison. Locomotive 530 was scheduled to take the train completely between Dodge City and Newton, but a burst cylinder head in Kent, Kansas, necessitated adding locomotive 1095 for the 26 miles (42 km) between Kent and Newton.

En route, Scott and his guests enjoyed the finest meals that the Fred Harvey Company had to offer. Menu selections included such luxurious offerings as caviar, iced consommé, and Porterhouse steak à la Coyote.

One more locomotive and crew took the train to Chillicothe where it made its final locomotive change for the last leg into Chicago. Engineer Charles Losee piloted the train for its entire run across Illinois, at an average speed of 60 mph (97 km/h), staying aboard the train during the locomotive change in Chillicothe. The train officially arrived at Dearborn Station at 11:54 am Central Time on July 11.

== Legacy and preservation ==
Cover for the videotape of the "Death Valley Days" episode titled "Death Valley Scotty!"

The speed record set by the Scott Special stood for many years and was not beaten in regular service until the introduction of the Super Chief in 1936. What makes the Scott Special especially remarkable is that it was run under normal operating conditions:

[The] run was made under normal conditions of track, motive power, and equipment, and practically on a moment's notice. No racing machines were used. The locomotives were the plain, everyday kind, taken from regular runs and manned by employees taking their regular turn. To be sure, the main line was kept clear, and even the exclusive California Limited put on the side track. The Scott Special had the right-of-way. That was the only favor shown it, though the engineers understood they had permission to 'let her out a few notches', and they did so, when they could with safety.

In 1955, on the 50th anniversary of the Scott Special's 1905 run, the event was re-enacted for the syndicated television anthology series, Death Valley Days, hosted by Stanley Andrews. The production crew reused Santa Fe locomotive number 1010, the 2-6-2 locomotive that was used in the original run between Needles, California, and Seligman, Arizona (and the only unit still on Santa Fe's active roster). Robert Hinze, a fireman on the original Scott Special, was on hand to aid in the recreation as the replica train worked over Cajon Pass in California. In October 1984, the Santa Fe donated locomotive 1010 to the California State Railroad Museum, where it remains on static display.In October 2023, CSRM announced that 1010 will undergo restoration to operating condition, although the locomotive is still on display as fundraising is underway.

The 100th anniversary of the Scott Special was commemorated with localized events and interpretive displays along the train's route sponsored by various historical organizations. One such display was shown at Joliet, Illinois, by the Blackhawk Chapter of the National Railway Historical Society; the Scott Special passed Joliet just after 11:00 am on July 11, 1905.

Amtrak's daily Southwest Chief follows nearly the same route as the Scott Special. As of 2006, the Southwest Chief makes the journey in just under 43 hours, departing Los Angeles Union Station at 6:45 pm Pacific Time, and scheduled to arrive at Chicago Union Station at 3:20 pm Central Time on the second day of the trip.

Other than Santa Fe 1010, at least one of the cars from the Scott Special train it pulled survives today. Santa Fe dining car #1407 now resides at Stevinson, California in the San Joaquin Valley along with other antique passenger cars from the 1910s. It was reunited with 1010 briefly during the 1955 recreation of the special for Death Valley Days, and has since been converted into a business observation car (also used as a radio testing car).

== See also ==
- Passenger train service on the Atchison, Topeka and Santa Fe Railway
- Scotty's Castle
