= Santa Fe 2926 =

Preserved Santa Fe 2900 class 4-8-4 locomotive

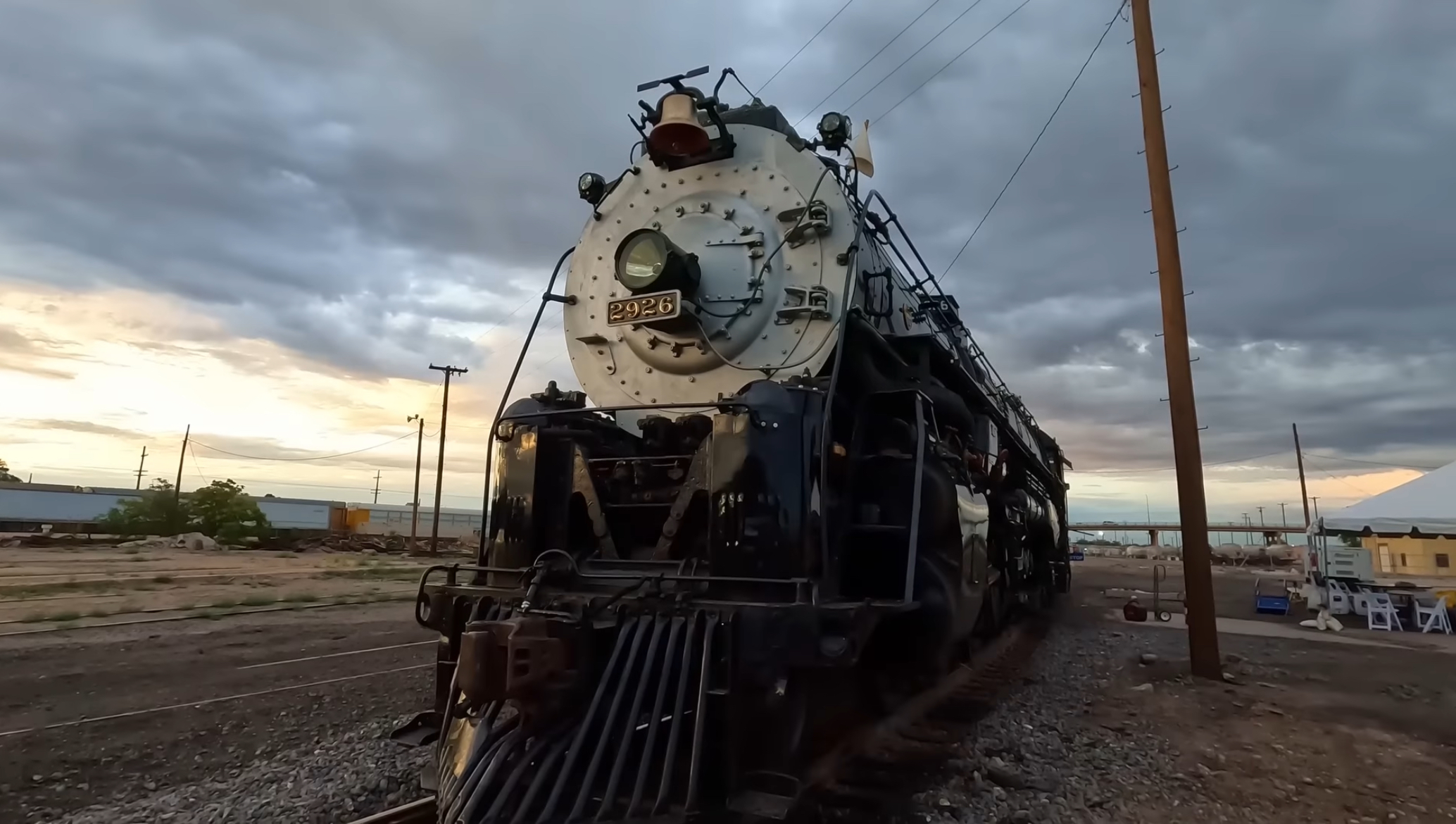
- Santa Fe No. 2926 at the Albuquerque Rail Yards on June 26, 2024.
Type and origin
- Power type: Steam
- Builder: Baldwin Locomotive Works
- Serial number: 69814
- Build date: May 1944
Specifications
- Configuration
  - Whyte: 4-8-4
  - UIC: 2′D2′ h2
- Gauge: 4 ft 8 1/2 in (1,435 mm) standard gauge
- Leading dia.: 42 in (1,067 mm)
- Driver dia.: 80 in (2,032 mm)
- Trailing dia.: 50 in (1,270 mm)
- Length: 120 ft 10 in (36.83 m)
- Height: 16 ft 0 in (4.88 m)
- Axle load: 77,500 lb (35,200 kg)
- Adhesive weight: 293,860 lb (133,290 kg)
- Loco weight: 510,150 lb (231,400 kg)
- Tender weight: 464,700 lb (210,800 kg)
- Total weight: 974,850 lb (442,180 kg)
- Fuel type: Oil
- Fuel capacity: 7,170 US gal (27,100 L; 5,970 imp gal)
- Water cap.: 24,500 US gal (93,000 L; 20,400 imp gal)
- Water consumption: 6,000 US gal (23,000 L; 5,000 imp gal) per hour
- Firebox
  - Grate area: 108 sq ft (10.0 m^{2})
- Boiler: 102 in (2,591 mm)
- Boiler pressure: 300 psi (2.1 MPa)
- Cylinders: Two, outside
- Cylinder size: 28 in × 32 in (711 mm × 813 mm)
- Valve gear: Walschaerts
- Valve type: Piston valves
- Loco brake: Air
- Train brakes: 26L Air
- Couplers: Knuckle
Performance figures
- Maximum speed: 120 mph (190 km/h)
- Power output: 4,590 hp (3,420 kW) at 40 mph (64 km/h)
- Tractive effort: 66,000 lbf (293.58 kN)
- Factor of adh.: 4.45
Career
- Operators: Atchison, Topeka and Santa Fe Railway; New Mexico Heritage Rail
- Class: 2900
- Number in class: 27th of 30
- Numbers: ATSF 2926
- Locale: Southwestern United States
- Retired: December 24, 1953
- Preserved: July 1956
- Restored: July 24, 2021
- Current owner: New Mexico Heritage Rail
- Disposition: Operational
- ATSF Locomotive No. 2926
- U.S. National Register of Historic Places
- NM State Register of Cultural Properties
- Albuquerque Historic Landmark
- Location within New Mexico Location within the United States
- Location: 1833 8th St NW, Albuquerque, New Mexico
- Coordinates: 35°6′11.8″N 106°39′17.7″W
- Area: less than one acre
- Built: 1944
- Architect: Baldwin Locomotive Works
- NRHP reference No.: 07000388
- NMSRCP No.: 366

Significant dates
- Added to NRHP: October 1, 2007
- Designated NMSRCP: February 28, 1975

Atchison, Topeka and Santa Fe 2926 is a 2900 class 4-8-4 "Northern" type steam locomotive, built in May 1944 by the Baldwin Locomotive Works (BLW) for the Atchison, Topeka & Santa Fe Railway (ATSF). It was used to pull passenger and fast freight trains, mostly throughout New Mexico, until retired from service in 1953. In 1956, ATSF donated No. 2926 to the City of Albuquerque, New Mexico for static display.

In 1999, the non-profit New Mexico Steam Locomotive and Railroad Historical Society purchased No. 2926 for restoration. In 2021, No. 2926 moved under its own power for the first time in almost 70 years. It is the world's heaviest 4-8-4, and the sole operating class 2900 locomotive among the last six in existence. The Society, under the trade name New Mexico Heritage Rail, plans to operate historic rail excursion trains behind No. 2926 between Albuquerque and Las Vegas, New Mexico.

== History ==
=== Revenue service ===
No. 2926 was among the last group of steam passenger locomotives built in 1944 by the Baldwin Locomotive Works in Eddystone (Philadelphia), Pennsylvania for the Atchison, Topeka and Santa Fe Railway. This class of locomotives comprised the heaviest 4-8-4's built in the United States, and among the largest. The railroad used the locomotive in both fast freight and passenger service, and it accumulated over one million miles of usage before its last revenue run on December 24, 1953. Equipped with the latest Timken roller-bearing tandem side-rods between 1946-1948, it was then approved for 110-mph speeds with the Santa Fe's crack passenger trains: up from 100-mph when delivered with its original side-rods.

=== Preservation ===
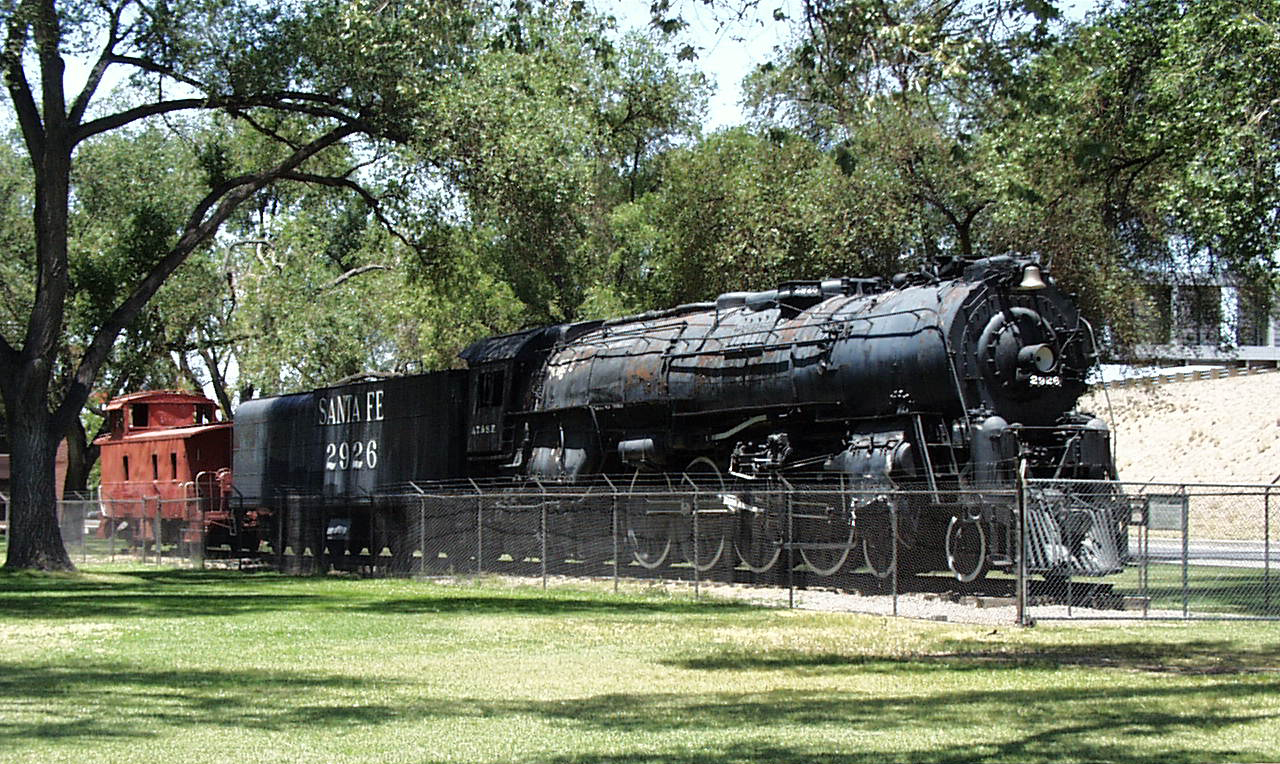
Santa Fe No. 2926 on display at Coronado Park in Albuquerque, New Mexico

The locomotive and a caboose were donated to the City of Albuquerque, New Mexico in July 1956 to recognize the city's 250th anniversary, and placed in Coronado Park. The city displayed the locomotive as a static exhibit in the park until it was sold for $1.00 to the Society on July 26, 1999. On June 23, 2000, the locomotive was moved by Messer Construction Company to a BNSF Railway rail siding just south of Menaul Boulevard. The locomotive has been listed on the National Register of Historic Places since October 1, 2007.

=== Restoration ===
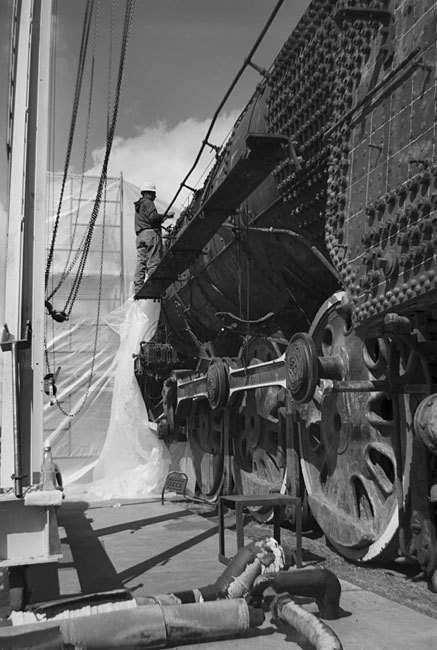
No. 2926 during the beginning of its restoration process on November 19, 2008

In May 2002, the No. 2926 locomotive was moved out on temporary snap tracks to its current location near the intersection of 8th Street and Haines Avenue, where it underwent a complete restoration to operating condition by the Society.

On February 11, 2016, House Memorial Bill 100, introduced by Don L. Tripp and adopted by the New Mexico Legislature, recognized the Santa Fe No. 2926 steam locomotive as "New Mexico's steam locomotive and a representative of the railroads' contributions to the economic and cultural growth and stature of New Mexico".

In January 2018, it was reported that the restoration was nearing completion, and that the locomotive could be operational by the end of the year. As of that date, NMSL&RHS members had put in 166,000 hours of volunteer labor and spent over $2.8 million on the project.

On August 20, 2018, the boiler of ATSF No. 2926 was fired up for the first time in sixty-five years. The locomotive was scheduled for a test run on March 20, 2020, when it would move under its own power for the first time since 1953. However, that event and most other restoration efforts were suspended due to the COVID-19 pandemic in New Mexico.

On July 24, 2021, the No. 2926 locomotive moved under its own power for the first time in sixty-eight years.

=== Excursion service ===
On May 6, 2023, No. 2926 visited a nearby brewing company for a fundraiser, a distance of about four blocks. The same visit happened two more times, on August 26, 2023, and May 4, 2024. On September 30, 2023, No. 2926 returned to the mainline on a 2.5-mile excursion to the Albuquerque Rail Yards to attend the New Mexico Railroad Days event. On June 14, 2025, it was announced that the New Mexico Department of Transportation and New Mexico Heritage Rail have agreed to allow No. 2926 to operate on 40 miles of state-owned trackage around Albuquerque from Bernalillo to Los Lunas. On September 26 and 27, 2026, the locomotive made a successful main line test run between Los Lunas, New Mexico and Bernalillo, New Mexico.

== Surviving sister engines ==
- 3751 moved from Viaduct Park in San Bernardino, California in 1986 for restoration to operating condition, which was completed in 1991.
- 3759 is displayed at Locomotive Park in Kingman, Arizona.
- 3768 is displayed at the Great Plains Transportation Museum in Wichita, Kansas.
- 2903 is displayed at the Illinois Railway Museum in Union, Illinois.
- 2912 is displayed at the Pueblo Railway Museum in Pueblo, Colorado.
- 2913 is displayed at Riverview Park in Fort Madison, Iowa.
- 2921 is displayed at the Modesto Amtrak Station in Modesto, California.
- 2925 is displayed at the California State Railroad Museum in Sacramento, California.

== Historic designations ==
- National Register of Historic Places #NPS–#07000388

== See also ==
- Santa Fe 3415
- Grand Canyon Railway 4960
- Spokane, Portland & Seattle 700
- Southern Pacific 4449
- Union Pacific 844
- Milwaukee Road 261
