= Santa Fe 2913 =

American locomotive (retired 1959)

Coordinates: 40°37′46.6″N 91°18′32.7″W

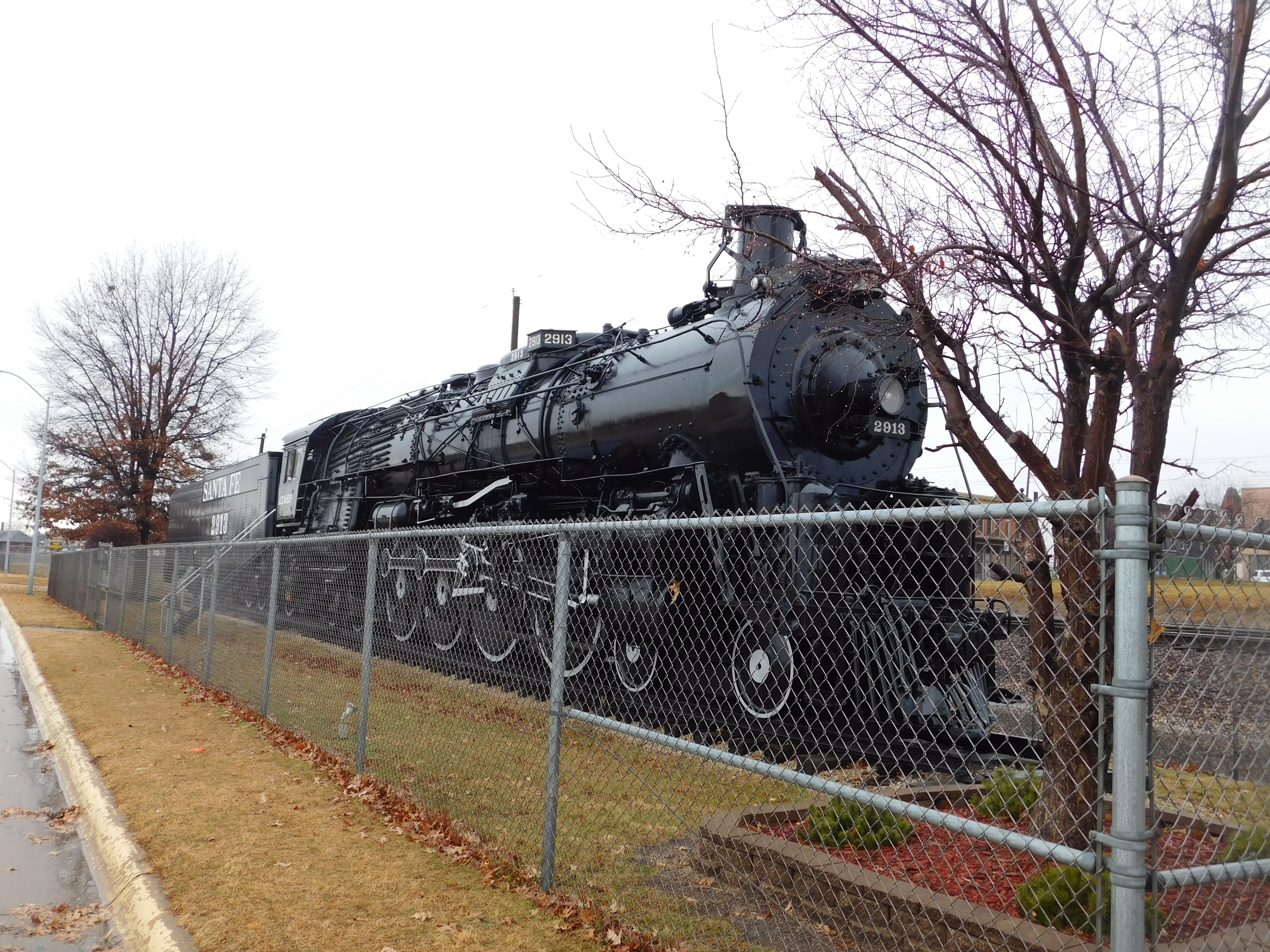
- Santa Fe 2913 on display.
Type and origin
- Power type: Steam
- Builder: Baldwin Locomotive Works
- Serial number: 69801
- Build date: 1943
Specifications
- Configuration
  - Whyte: 4-8-4
- Gauge: 4 ft 8 1/2 in (1,435 mm)
- Driver dia.: 80 in (2,000 mm)
- Length: 120 ft 10 in (36.83 m)
- Adhesive weight: 295,000 lb (134,000 kg)
- Loco weight: 510,700 lb (231,600 kg)
- Total weight: 974,850 lb (442,180 kg)
- Fuel type: Oil
- Fuel capacity: 7,000 US gal (26,000 L; 5,800 imp gal)
- Water cap.: 24,500 US gal (93,000 L; 20,400 imp gal)
- Firebox
  - Grate area: 108 sq ft (10.0 m^{2})
- Boiler pressure: 300 psi (2.1 MPa)
- Cylinders: Two, outside
- Cylinder size: 28 in × 32 in (710 mm × 810 mm)
- Valve gear: Walschaerts
- Valve type: Piston valves
- Loco brake: Air
- Train brakes: Air
- Couplers: Knuckle
Performance figures
- Tractive effort: 66,000 lbf (293.58 kN)
- Factor of adh.: 4.47
Career
- Operators: Atchison, Topeka and Santa Fe Railway
- Class: 2900
- Number in class: 14 of 30
- Numbers: ATSF 2913
- Retired: April 1959
- Disposition: On static display

Santa Fe 2913 is a 2900 class 4-8-4 "Northern" type locomotive. Built in 1943 by the Baldwin Locomotive Works, it pulled freight and passenger trains until its retirement in 1959. It is now on display in a park in Fort Madison, Iowa, having been donated to the town upon retirement.

== Surviving sister engines ==
- 3751 moved from Viaduct Park in San Bernardino, California in 1986 for restoration to operating condition, which was completed in 1991.
- 3759 is displayed at Locomotive Park in Kingman, Arizona.
- 3768 is displayed at Great Plains Transportation Museum in Wichita, Kansas.
- 2903 is displayed at the Illinois Railway Museum in Union, Illinois.
- 2912 is displayed at the Pueblo Railway Museum in Pueblo, Colorado.
- 2921 is displayed at the Modesto Amtrak Station in Modesto, California.
- 2925 is displayed at the California State Railroad Museum in Sacramento, California.
- 2926 moved from Coronado Park in Albuquerque, New Mexico in 1999 to the New Mexico Steam Locomotive and Railroad Historical Society; then moved again for restoration to operating condition, which was completed in 2021.
