= Santa Fe Class 2900 =

Santa Fe 2900 Class

Atchison, Topeka & Santa Fe 2900 Class
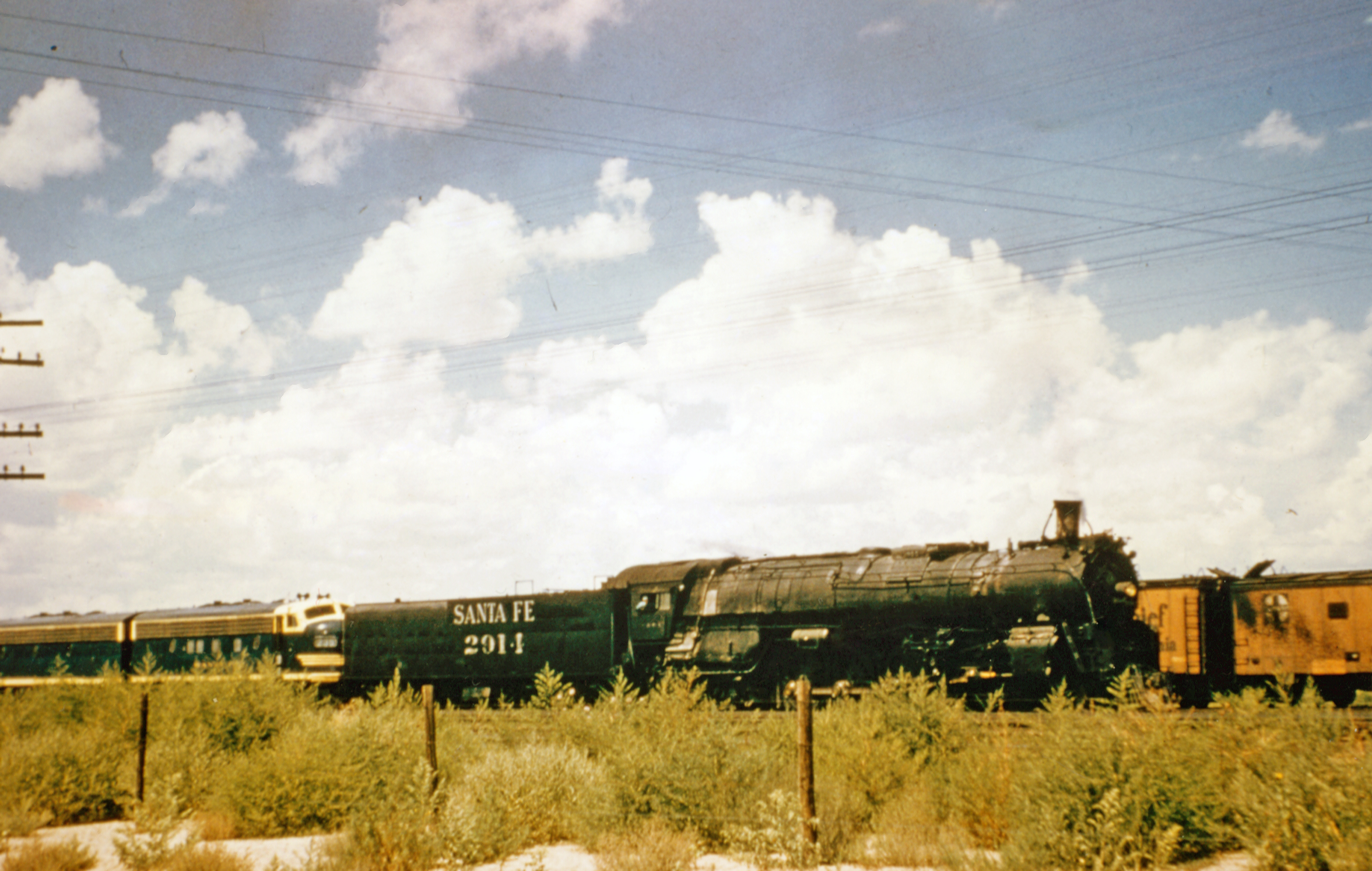
- Eastbound freight on the Santa Fe pulled by Santa Fe 2914 on August 22, 1952.
Type and origin
- Power type: Steam
- Builder: Baldwin Locomotive Works
- Build date: 1943-1944
- Total produced: 30
Specifications
- Configuration
  - Whyte: 4-8-4
  - UIC: 2′D2′ h2
- Gauge: 4 ft 8 1/2 in (1,435 mm) standard gauge
- Driver dia.: 80 in (2,032 mm)
- Length: 120 ft 10 in (36.83 m)
- Axle load: 77,500 lb (35,200 kg)
- Adhesive weight: 293,860 lb (133,290 kg)
- Loco weight: 510,150 lb (231,400 kg)
- Tender weight: 464,700 lb (210,800 kg)
- Total weight: 974,850 lb (442,180 kg)
- Fuel type: Oil
- Fuel capacity: 7,000 US gal (26,000 L; 5,800 imp gal)
- Water cap.: 24,500 US gal (93,000 L; 20,400 imp gal)
- Firebox
  - Grate area: 108 sq ft (10.0 m^{2})
- Boiler: 102 in (2,591 mm)
- Boiler pressure: 300 lbf/in^{2} (2.1 MPa)
- Cylinders: Two, outside
- Cylinder size: 28 in × 32 in (711 mm × 813 mm)
- Valve gear: Walschaert
- Valve type: Piston valves
Performance figures
- Maximum speed: 120 mph (190 km/h)
- Power output: 4,590 hp (3,420 kW) @ 40 mph
- Tractive effort: 66,000 lbf (293.58 kN)
- Factor of adh.: 4.45
Career
- Operators: Santa Fe
- Class: 2900
- Numbers: 2900-2929
- Retired: 1953-1959
- Preserved: Six (Nos. 2903, 2912, 2913, 2921, 2925 and 2926) preserved
- Disposition: Five on display and one (2926) operational, remainder scrapped

The Santa Fe 2900 Class was a series of 30 4-8-4 "Northern" type steam locomotives built between 1943 and 1944 by the Baldwin Locomotive Works (BLW) for Atchison, Topeka and Santa Fe Railroad (ATSF) and pulled freight and passenger trains until retirement in the early to late-1950s.

Today, six 2900s survive, with five engines on static display and one, No. 2926, has been restored to operating condition in Albuquerque, New Mexico. Fully restored in July 2021, it is considered to be the largest and heaviest operating 4-8-4 type steam locomotive in the world.

== History ==
Being built during World War II, wartime shortages of lightweight metals resulted in ordinary metals being used for their construction. This resulted in the class being the heaviest 4-8-4s ever built. They outweighed their nearest rivals by over 2,000 pounds. They have Timken roller bearings on all axles. Between 1946 and 1948, they were then approved for 110 mph (180 km/h) speeds with the Santa Fe's express passenger trains after being fitted with Timken roller bearing tandem side-rods, up from 100-mph when delivered with its original side-rods. However, anecdotes from retired drivers suggest the class could run for long periods at speeds of over 120 mph (190 km/h).

Though they were designed to haul passenger trains, wartime exigencies required that they also haul fast freight until the war ended. After the war, they hauled passenger trains such as the Chief, Scout and Grand Canyon Limited. After diesels took over, the class was retired by 1959.

== Preservation ==
Six 2900s survived into preservation:

- 2903 is displayed at the Illinois Railway Museum in Union, Illinois.
- 2912 is displayed at the Pueblo Railway Museum in Pueblo, Colorado.
- 2913 is displayed at Riverview Park in Fort Madison, Iowa.
- 2921 was originally displayed at Beard Brook Park in Modesto. It is now displayed at the Modesto Amtrak Station in Modesto, California.
- 2925 is displayed at the California State Railroad Museum in Sacramento, California.
- 2926 moved from Coronado Park in Albuquerque, New Mexico in 1999 to the New Mexico Steam Locomotive and Railroad Historical Society (later renamed to New Mexico Heritage Rail) there; then moved locally for rebuilding to operating condition. Restoration was complete in July 2021, and is currently operational. On October 1, 2007, No. 2926 was added to the National Register of Historic Places.

== Roster ==
Number	Baldwin serial number	Date built	Disposition	Notes
2900	69788	1943	Sold for scrap.	
2901	69789	1943	Sold for scrap.	
2902	69790	1943	Sold for scrap.	
2903	69791	1943	On display at the Illinois Railway Museum in Union, Illinois.	
2904	69792	1943	Sold for scrap.	
2905	69793	1943	Sold for scrap.	
2906	69794	1943	Sold for scrap.	
2907	69795	1943	Sold for scrap.	
2908	69796	1943	Sold for scrap.	
2909	69797	1943	Sold for scrap.	
2910	69798	1943	Sold for scrap.	
2911	69799	1943	Sold for scrap.	
2912	69800	1943	On display in Pueblo, Colorado.	
2913	69801	1944	On display in Fort Madison, Iowa.	
2914	69802	1944	Sold for scrap.	
2915	69803	1944	Sold for scrap.	
2916	69804	1944	Sold for scrap.	
2917	69805	1944	Sold for scrap	
2918	69806	1944	Sold for scrap.	
2919	69807	1944	Sold for scrap.	
2920	69808	1944	Sold for scrap.	
2921	69809	1944	On display at the Amtrak Station in Modesto, California.	
2922	69810	1944	Sold for scrap.	
2923	69811	1944	Sold for scrap.	
2924	69812	1944	Sold for scrap.	
2925	69813	1944	On display at the California State Railroad Museum in Sacramento, California.	
2926	69814	March 1944	Operational in Albuquerque, New Mexico.	On the National Register of Historic Places
2927	69815	1944	Sold for scrap.	
2928	69816	1944	Sold for scrap.	
2929	69817	1944	Sold for scrap.	

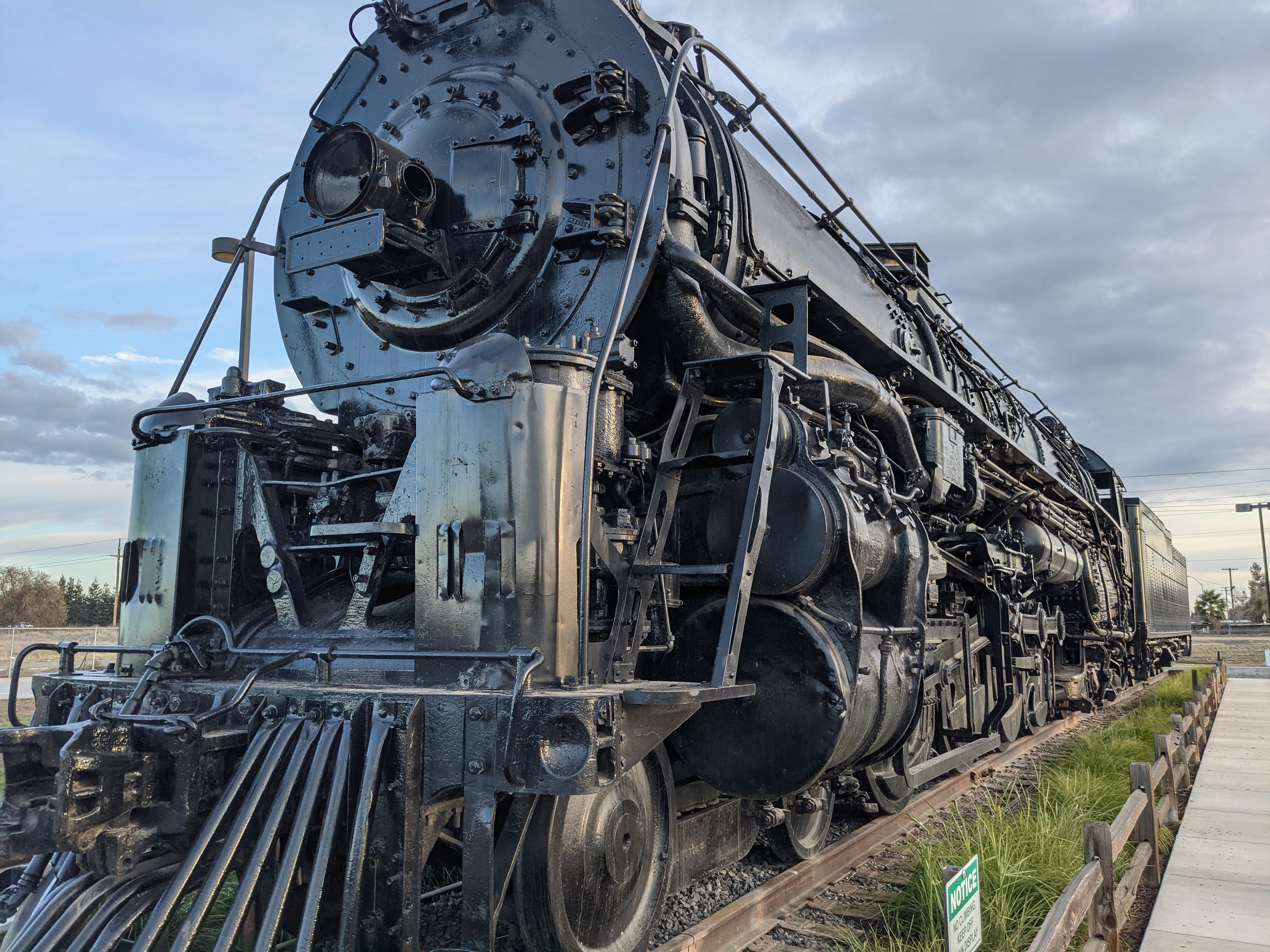
2921 in Modesto

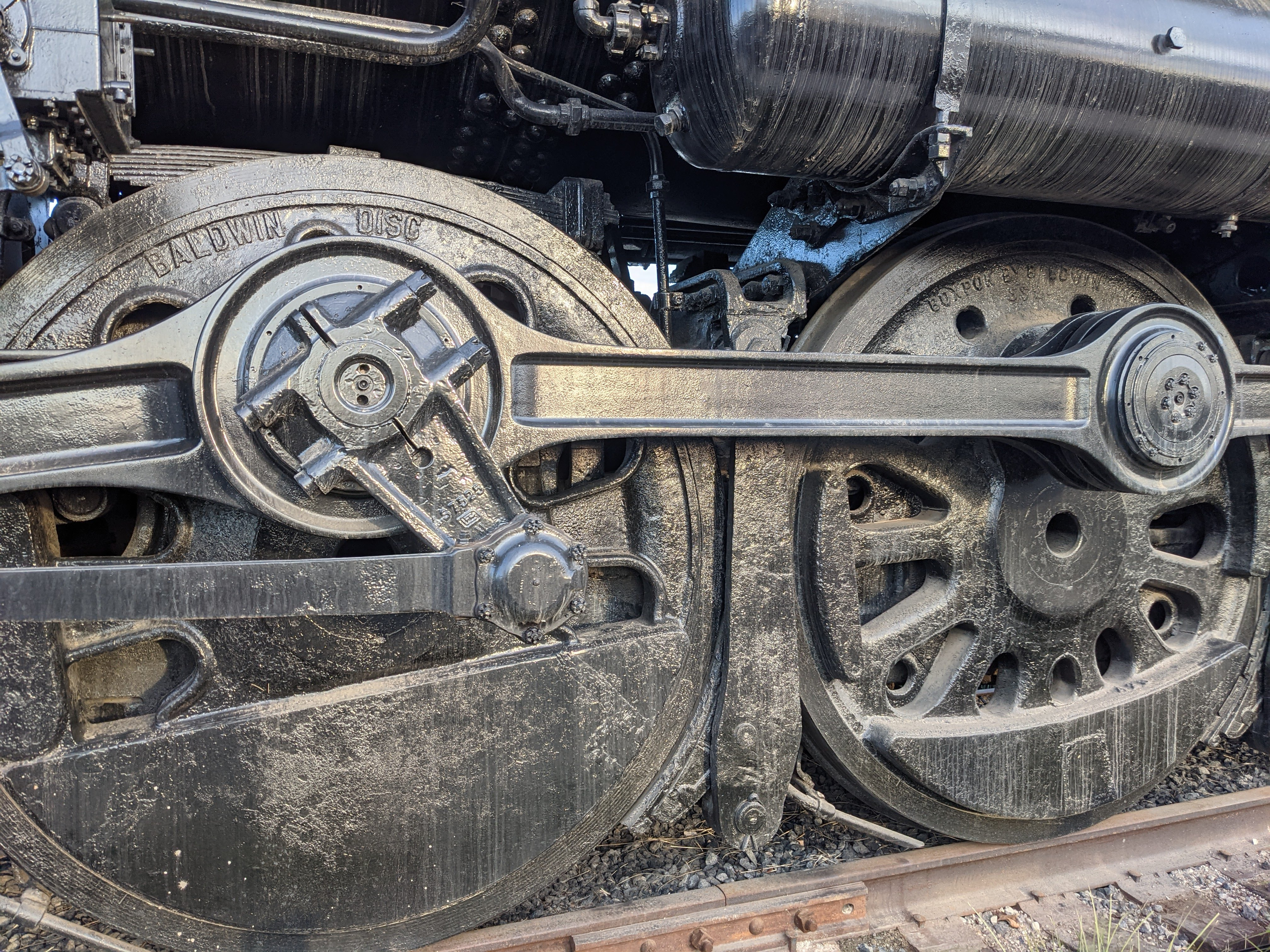
2921 drive wheels
