= California State Railroad Museum =

Railroad museum in Sacramento, California

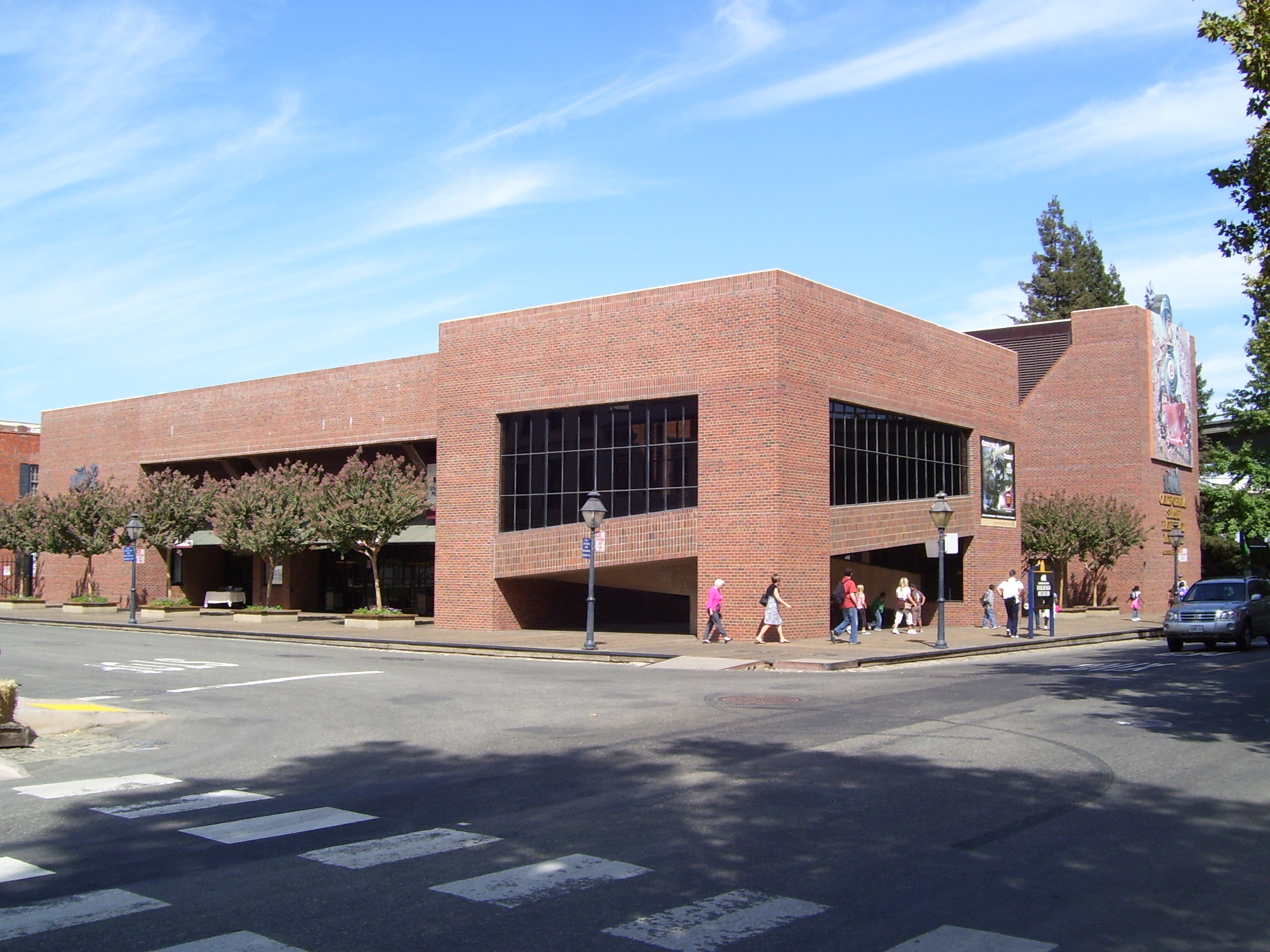
- Railroad Museum exterior

- Location within California Location within the United States
- Location: 111 I Street, Sacramento, California
- Coordinates: 38°35′5″N 121°30′16″W
- Established: 1981
- Governing body: California Department of Parks and Recreation
- Website: https://www.californiarailroad.museum/

The California State Railroad Museum is a museum in the California State Parks system that interprets the role of railroads in the Western U.S. It is located in Old Sacramento State Historic Park at 111 I Street, Sacramento, California.

== Features ==
The museum features 21 restored locomotives and railroad cars, some dating back to 1862. The "Sierra Scene" shows a large scale mockup of a construction scene high in the Sierra Nevada representing Donner Pass c. 1867, featuring the locomotive Gov. Stanford. Other exhibits show how the influence of railroads changed American society, influencing travel, commerce and daily life, as well as the lives of railroaders and the diversity of people who work on railroads. Changing exhibits featuring photography, ephemera, and artifacts from the museum's collection, add depth and incidental information to the overall story of railroad history. The museum has an extensive educational program for elementary students from across the region to help them learn about railroad history using re-enactments, costumed docents, and including train and handcar rides. The roundhouse area of the museum features a rotating display of locomotives and equipment belonging to the museum. When not on display, these items are stored and worked on at the nearby Sacramento Railyards in the remaining buildings that were part of the original Southern Pacific Shop complex. A large 3-rail O scale model train layout is also located in the museum.

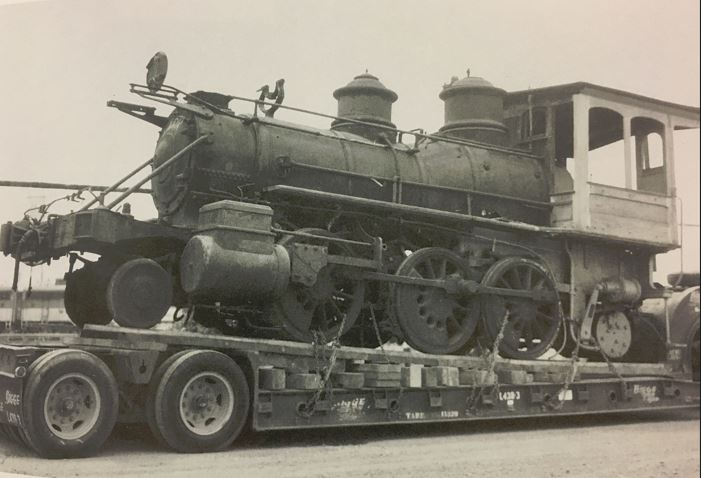
Virginia & Truckee RR 13, "Empire," (before restoration). Its last owner was the Pacific Portland Cement Company in Gerlach, NV, in the 20th century.

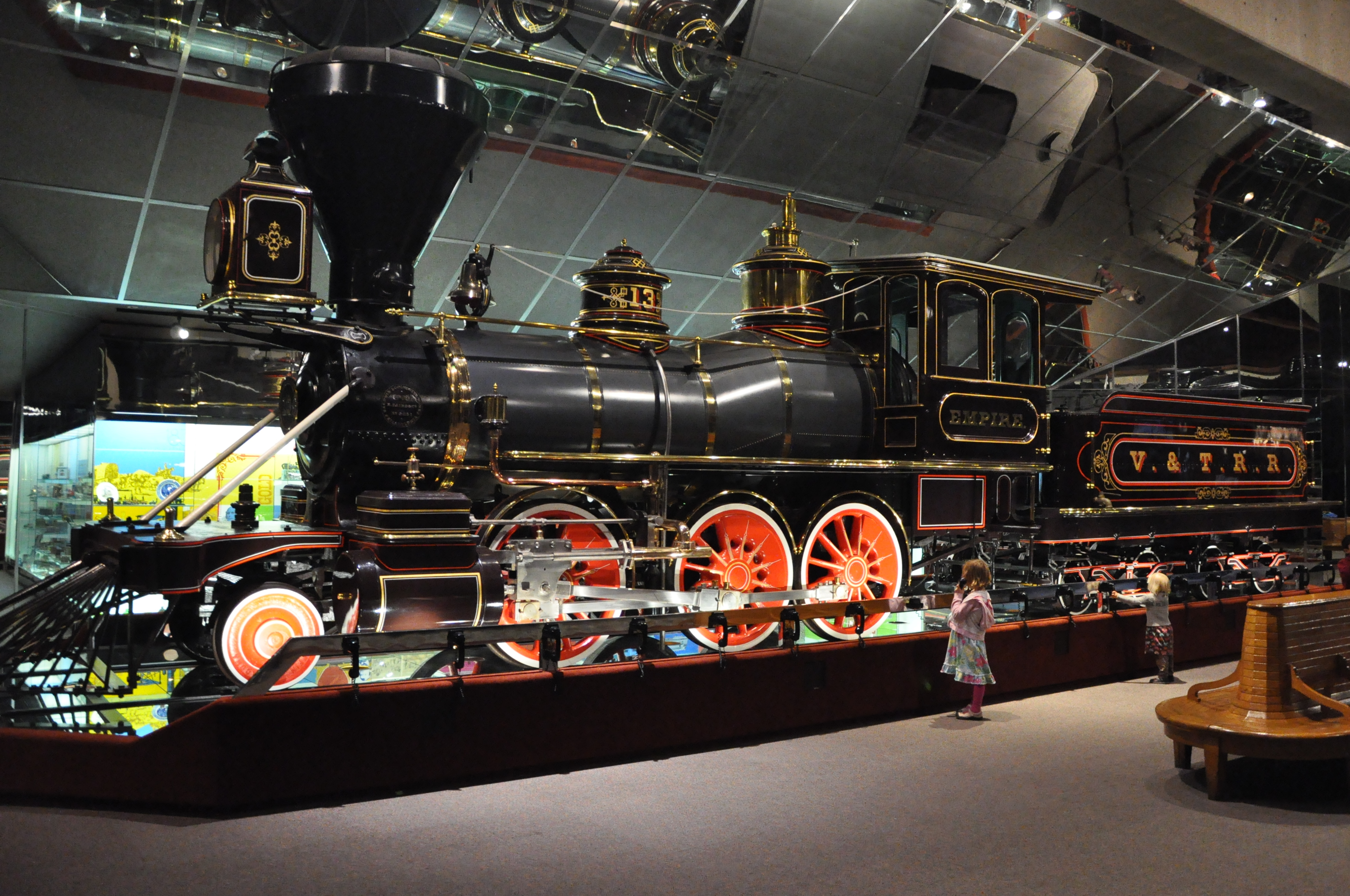
Virginia & Truckee 13, "Empire," (after restoration), at the California State Railroad Museum. Its restoration includes numerous design elements from the engine's early years in the 1800s.

Adjacent to the main museum building is a reconstruction of the 1870s-era Central Pacific Railroad passenger station and freight depot on Front Street, which houses historic and contemporary railroad equipment. In early 2011, the interior remained closed to public use, but is occasionally open for special events. Between April and October, the Sacramento Southern Railroad, operated by the museum, takes passengers on a 40-minute, 6-mile (9.7 km) roundtrip route along the Sacramento River on a portion of the Walnut Grove branch of the former Southern Pacific Railroad. The Sacramento Southern Railroad owns the Walnut Grove Branch right-of-way that extends south from Sacramento along the eastern bank of the Sacramento River. Past plans for the excursion ride included expansion on its former right of way to Hood, CA, but were scrapped in favor of a mixed-use paved recreational trail known as the Del Rio Trail project.

In 1992, the Railtown 1897 State Historic Park in Jamestown began operating under the museum.

In recent years the museum has begun expanding their digital resources. Of note, the museum has several digital exhibits and a museum podcast Roundhouse Crosstalk.

== Library and archives ==
In addition to the rolling stock and exhibits on display, the California State Railroad Museum collects material relating to railroading in the West. The museum's library and archives contain:

- Books: The museum's library holds hundreds of books ranging from the modern era to the early days of railroading in the United States. Prominent authors in the library's collections include Lucius Beebe and Charles Clegg. Topics in these books range from technical specifications, railroad culture, various regional railroad histories, and corporate histories of railroads.
- Technical drawings: These drawings consist mainly of locomotives, equipment, structures, maps and track layouts of railroads in the western part of the United States. A significant part of this collection comes from the Southern Pacific Railroad Company, and the Lima Locomotive Works.
- Railroad Photography: The Museum's photo collection is extensive, covering hundreds of different railroads across the West. These railroads include but are not limited to the Southern Pacific Railroad, Western Pacific Railroad, Denver and Rio Grande Western, and Santa Fe Railroad.
- Railroad ephemera: such as informational pamphlets and promotional materials for railroad companies.
- Artifacts: examples include signs, pins, and large physical objects relating to working or being involved in the railroad.
- Archival Collections: The museum's archival collections contain materials donated to the archive from railroad employees, railroad companies, railfan groups, and others from across the United States.

== History ==
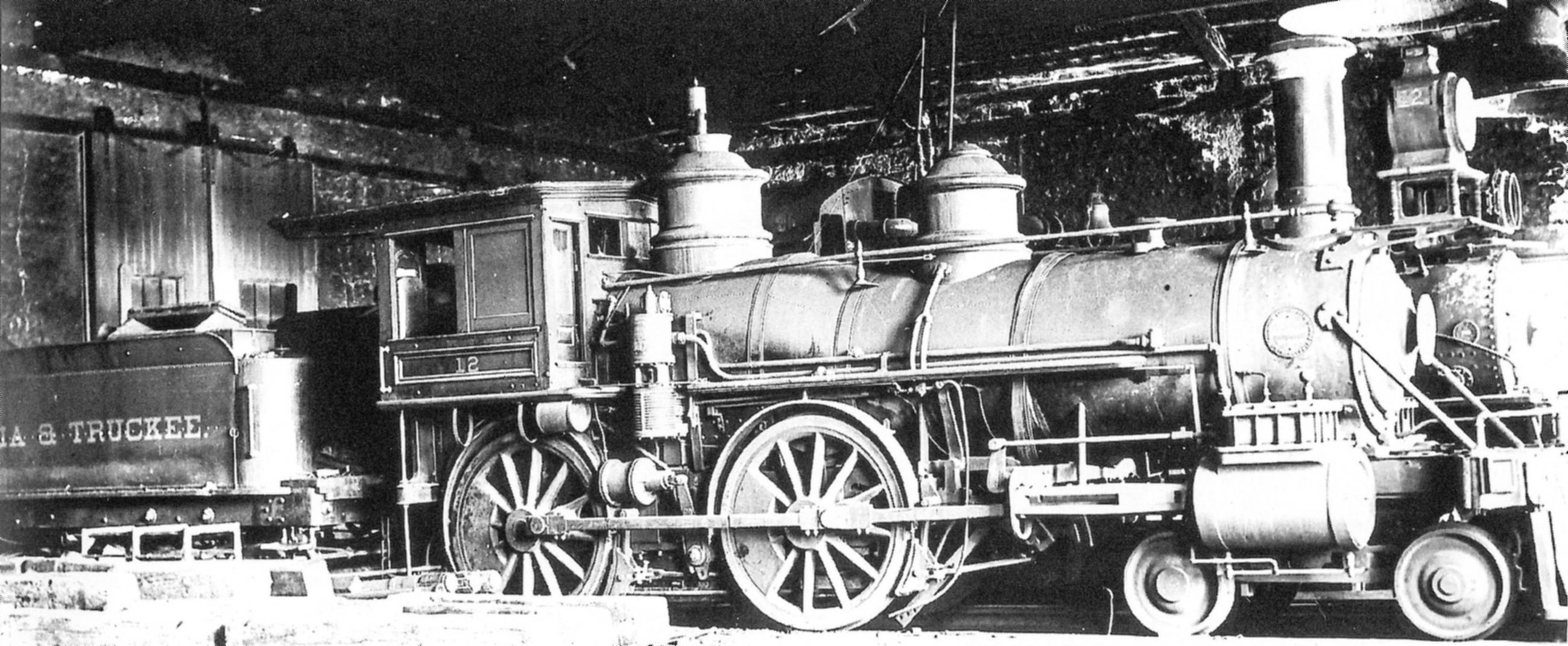
Virginia & Truckee RR 12, "Genoa," in its 20th-century configuration (e.g., straight stack, round headlight, etc.), before restoration.

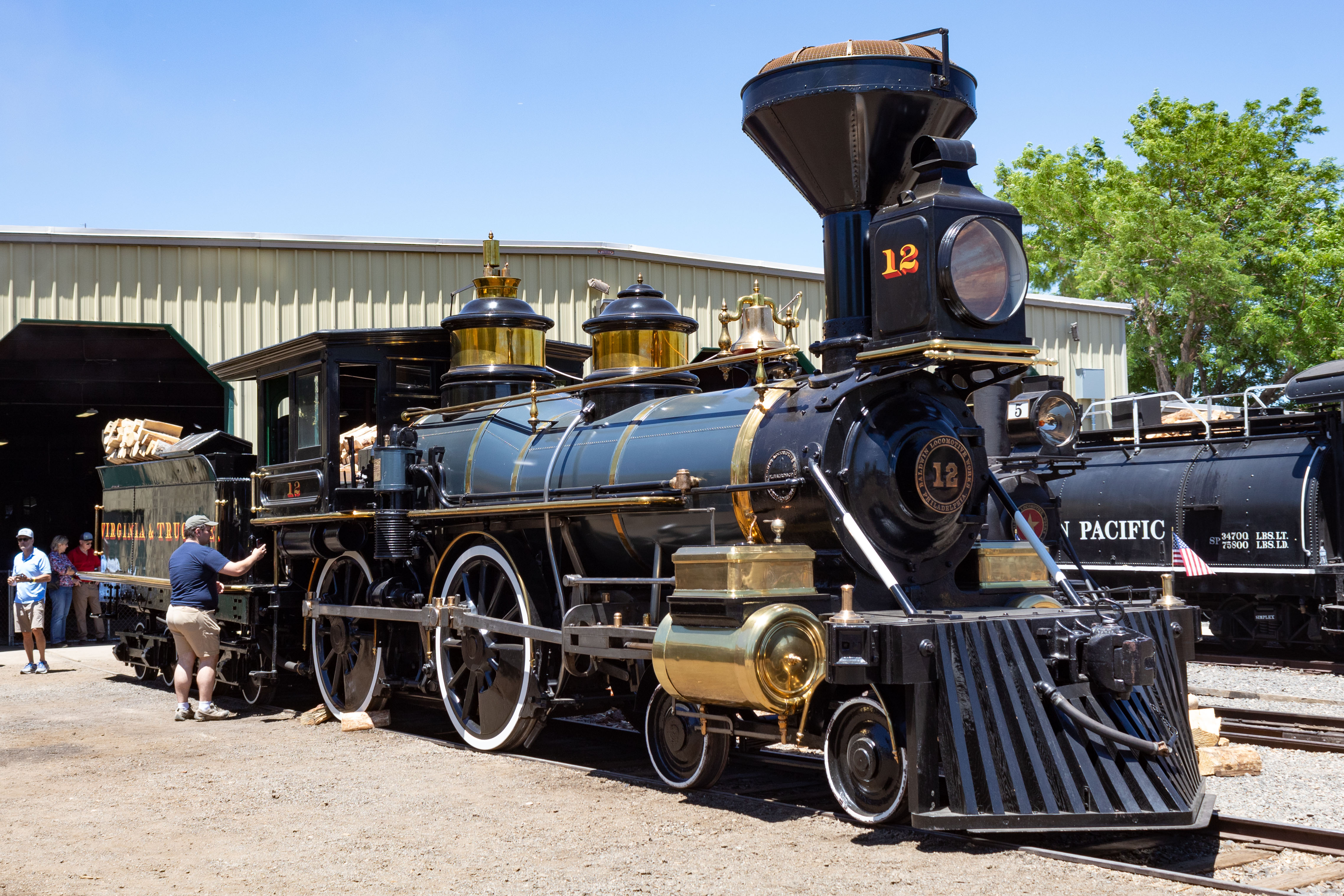
The Virginia & Truckee RR 12, "Genoa" (built in 1873) after its restoration, which incorporated many of its 1800s design features

The museum has its origins in 1937, when a group of railroad enthusiasts in the San Francisco Bay Area formed the Pacific Coast Chapter of the Railway & Locomotive Historical Society. This organization worked for years to promote the idea of a railroad museum, donating 30 historic locomotives and cars to the California Department of Parks and Recreation to be the nucleus of a State-operated museum in Sacramento. The museum's first facility, the Central Pacific Railroad Passenger Station, opened in 1976. The Railroad History Museum was completed in 1981. Steam-powered passenger train service on the Sacramento Southern Railroad began in 1984, with the Central Pacific Railroad Freight Depot opening three years later. Railtown 1897 State Historic Park in Jamestown was added to the museum complex during 1992. The museum became a Smithsonian affiliate in June 2017.

== Locomotives ==
=== Steam locomotives ===
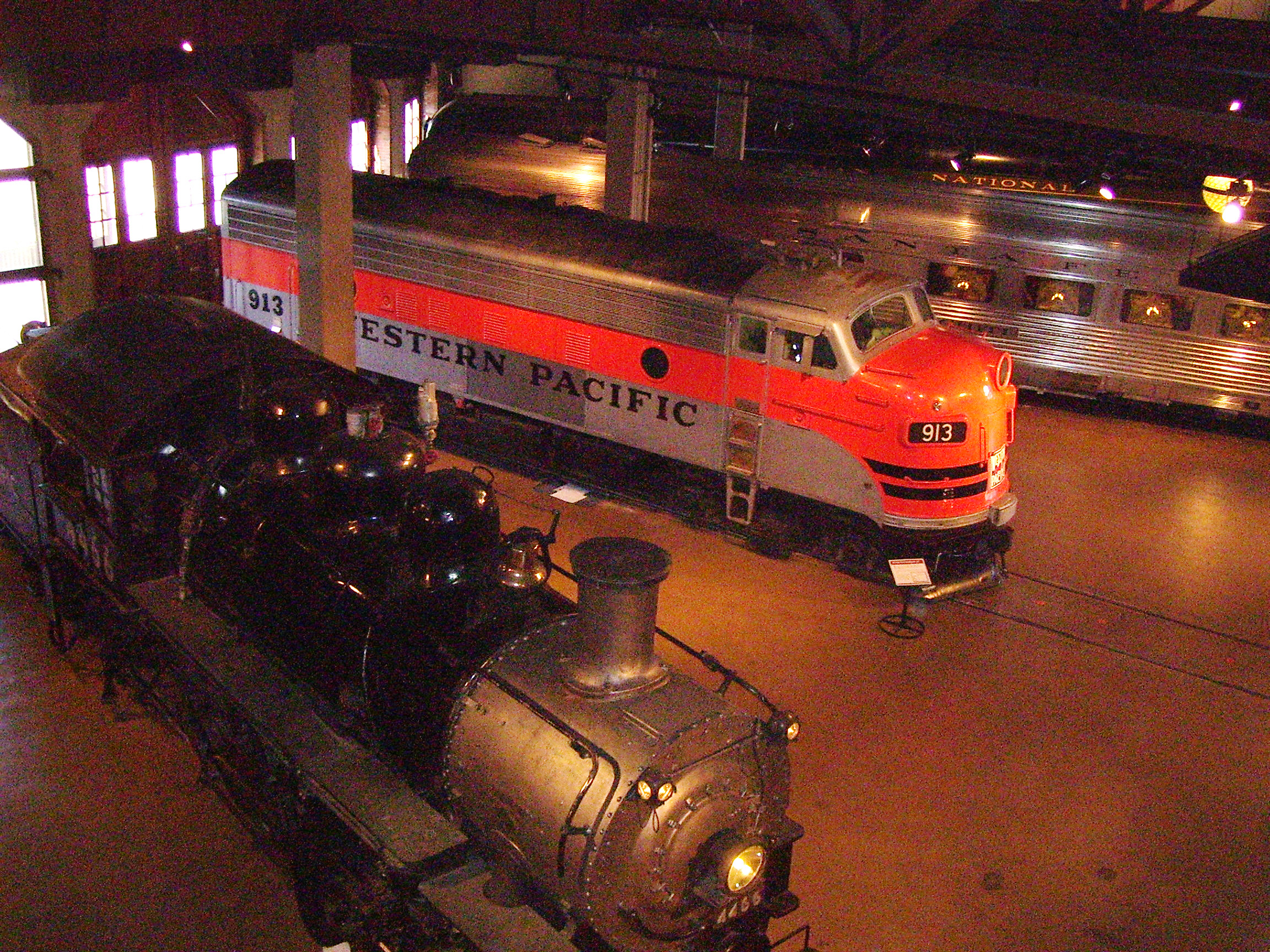
Museum interior

- Atchison, Topeka and Santa Fe 2925 – Stored, a 4-8-4 built by Baldwin Locomotive Works in 1944.
- Atchison, Topeka and Santa Fe 1010 – awaiting restoration to operating condition, a 2-6-2 type built by Baldwin Locomotive Works in 1901. The locomotive was used in the record breaking 44 hour and 54 minute Walter E. Scott's Scott Special between Los Angeles and Chicago in 1905. It was used on the segment of the trip between Needles, California, and Seligman, Arizona.
- Atchison, Topeka and Santa Fe 5021 – Stored, a 2-10-4 built by Baldwin Locomotive Works in 1944.
- Central Pacific No. 1 Gov. Stanford – Cosmetically restored, a 4-4-0 built by Norris Locomotive Works in 1862.
- Granite Rock Co. 10 (Operating as the excursion train ride for the California State Railroad Museum) a USATC S100 Class 0-6-0T built by Porter in 1942. Occasionally visits other railroads such as the Niles Canyon Railway
- Northwestern Pacific 112 – Stored, a 4-6-0 type built by ALCO in 1908. Sole surviving NWP steam locomotive.
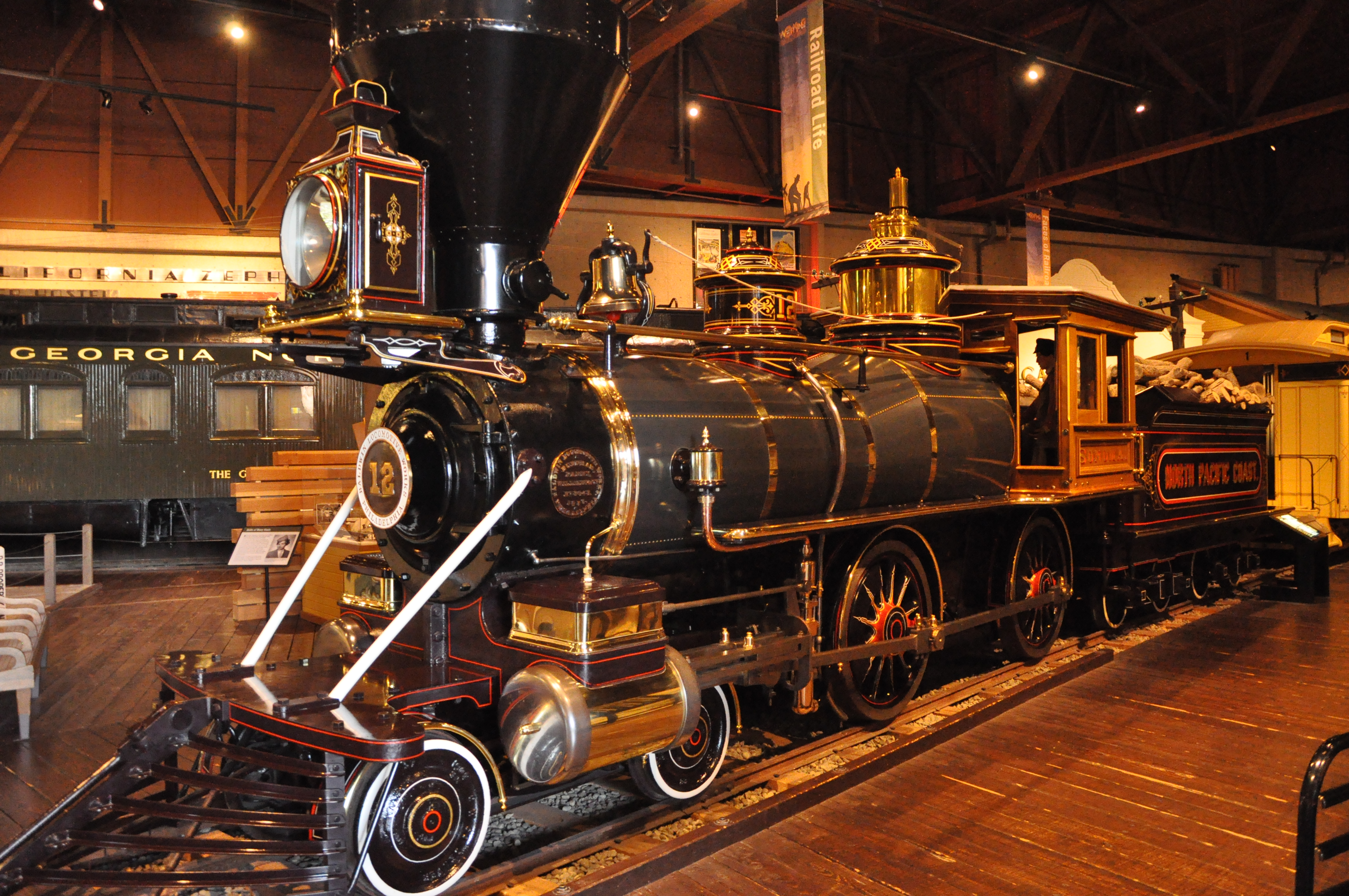
- North Pacific Coast 12
  North Pacific Coast 12 Sonoma – Cosmetically restored, a 3 ft (914 mm) narrow gauge 4-4-0 built by Baldwin in 1875. Sole surviving NPC locomotive, and one of only three surviving Baldwin 8/18C class 3 ft (914 mm) narrow gauge 4-4-0s.
- Central Pacific No. 3 / Southern Pacific No. 1 C. P. Huntington – Cosmetically restored, a 4-2-4TRT type built by Cooke Locomotive Works in 1863.
- Central Pacific No. 233 – Stored, awaiting restoration. A 2-6-2T built by Central Pacific's Sacramento Shops in 1882. Donated 2001 by the Pacific Locomotive Association.
- Southern Pacific 2467 – Display operable. Restored to operation by members of the Pacific Locomotive Association in 1999, a 4-6-2 type built by Baldwin Locomotive Works in 1921. Now Owned By The CSRM As of 2023.
- Southern Pacific 4294 – Cosmetically restored, a 4-8-8-2 built by Baldwin Locomotive Works in 1944. Sole surviving "Cab-Forward" locomotive.
- Union Pacific 4466 – Displayed, an 0-6-0 built by Lima Locomotive Works in 1920 which operated at the museum until 1999.
- Virginia & Truckee 12 Genoa – Baldwin-built 4-4-0 constructed in 1873. Currently on loan to the Nevada State Railroad Museum. Reportedly in operational condition, though it has not run since May 1979.
- Virginia & Truckee 13 Empire – Baldwin-built 2-6-0 type constructed in 1873, cosmetically restored to its original appearance. Mirrors placed around the engine provide museum visitors with an amazing panoramic view of all sides of the locomotive at once.
- Virginia and Truckee 18 Dayton – 4-4-0 built by the Central Pacific locomotive shops in Sacramento in 1873. On loan from the Nevada State Railroad Museum
- Virginia & Truckee 21 J.W. Bowker – Baldwin-built 2-4-0 switcher constructed in 1875; sole surviving example of this type. On Loan to the Nevada State Railroad Museum.
- Nevada Short Line No. 1 – Baldwin-built 3 ft (914 mm) narrow gauge 2-6-0 (Mogul Type) constructed in 1879; on static display with a few cars and rests above all other trains on an elevated track; last time it was run was in 1939–40 for the Golden Gate International Exposition on daily reenactments of the 1869 Golden Spike ceremony.

=== Diesel locomotives ===
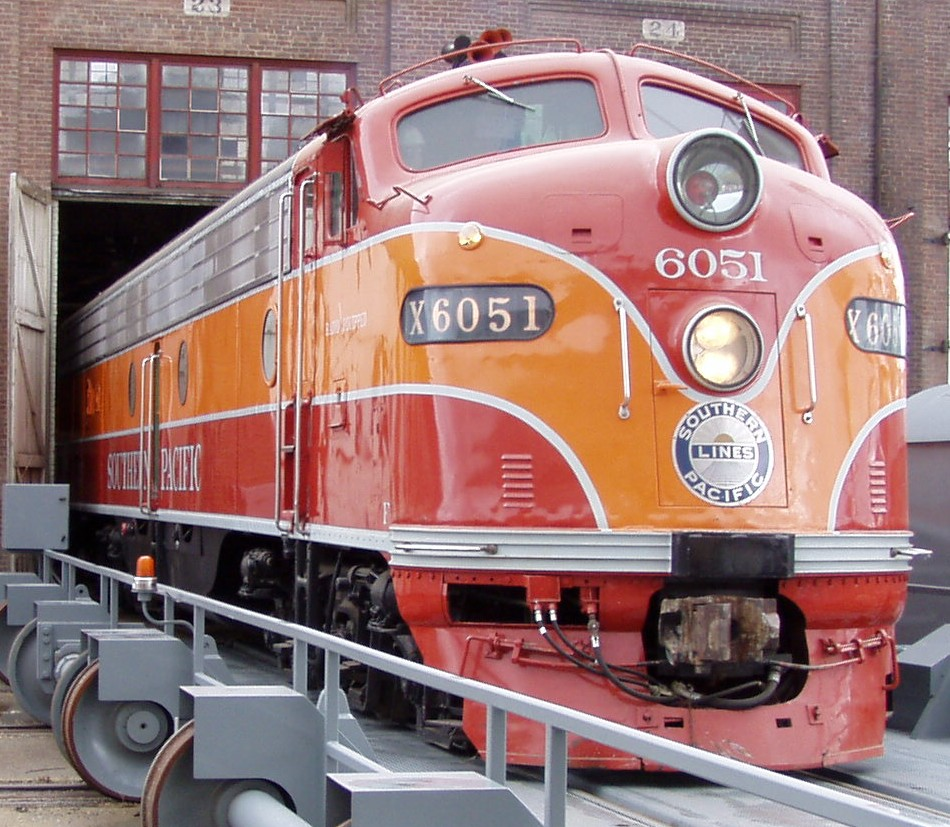
Southern Pacific#6051 EMD E9 painted in Daylight color scheme

- Amtrak 281 – Operational, an EMD F40PH built in April 1978. Only 1 of 5 Amtrak F40PH(R) locomotives preserved. Ironically, 281 was a Chicago-based Amtrak F40 during its revenue service life though occasionally visited California for hauling passenger trains such as the Reno Fun Train.
- Atchison, Topeka and Santa Fe 347C – Operational, an EMD F7 built in 1949. Sole surviving AT&SF F7 locomotive that was not converted into a CF7. Currently used as a cab control unit as it's prime mover and motors are non-operational, but repair work is underway to return the locomotive to full operation.
- Atchison, Topeka and Santa Fe 9820 – Stored, an ALCO RSD-15 "Alligator" built in 1959.
- Sacramento Northern 402 – Operational, an EMD SW1 built in 1939.
- Southern Pacific 1000 – Stored/Awaiting restoration, an EMD SW1 built in 1939, the first diesel fully owned by SP.
- Southern Pacific 5208 – Operational, a BLW DRS66-1500 built in 1949.
- Southern Pacific 6051 – Operational, an EMD E9 built in 1954. Sole surviving SP E9.
- Southern Pacific 6402 – Stored, an EMD F7 built in 1952. Parts of the locomotive has been cutaway to show the inner workings of a diesel locomotive.
- Southern Pacific 6819 – Operational, an EMD SD45T-2 built in 1972.
- Western Pacific 913 – Operational, an EMD F7 built in 1950.

== See also ==
- History of rail transportation in California
- California heritage railways
- Heritage railway
- List of heritage railways
- List of museums in California
