= Wilmington and Western 58 =

Preserved 0-6-0 steam locomotive

- Wilmington and Western No. 58 in November 2019
Type and origin
- Power type: Steam
- Builder: Baldwin Locomotive Works
- Serial number: 31899
- Build date: October 1907
Specifications
- Configuration
  - Whyte: 0-6-0
- Gauge: 4 ft 8 1/2 in (1,435 mm)
- Driver dia.: 56 in (1.422 m)
- Wheelbase: 42.58 ft (1,298 cm)
  - Drivers: 11.33 ft (345 cm)
- Axle load: 50,076 lb (22,714 kg)
- Loco weight: 150,226 lb (75.113 short tons; 68,141 kg)
- Tender weight: 100,000 lb (50 short tons; 45,000 kg)
- Total weight: 250,226 lb (125.113 short tons; 113,501 kg)
- Tender type: Slope-back
- Fuel type: Coal
- Fuel capacity: 6 t (13,000 lb)
- Water cap.: 5,000 US gal (19,000 L; 4,200 imp gal)
- Boiler pressure: 175 psi (1.21 MPa)
- Cylinders: Two, outside
- Cylinder size: 20 in × 26 in (508 mm × 660 mm)
- Valve gear: Stephenson
- Valve type: Piston valves
- Loco brake: Air
- Train brakes: Air
- Couplers: Knuckle
Performance figures
- Tractive effort: 29,993 pounds-force (133.42 kN)
- Factor of adh.: 5.01
Career
- Operators: Atlanta, Birmingham and Atlantic Railway; Atlanta, Birmingham and Coast Railroad; United States Army; Virginia Blue Ridge Railway; Mead Corporation; Valley Forge Scenic Railroad; Wilmington and Western Railroad
- Number in class: 6th of 7
- Numbers: AB&A 58; AB&C 27; USATC 6961; VBR 4; Mead 300; VFS 300; WWRC 58
- Nicknames: Veteran's Locomotive
- Retired: 1960s
- Preserved: December 1988
- Restored: November 28, 1998
- Current owner: Wilmington and Western Railroad
- Disposition: Operational

Wilmington and Western 58 is an 0-6-0 "Switcher" type steam locomotive, built in October 1907 by the Baldwin Locomotive Works (BLW) for the Atlanta, Birmingham and Atlantic Railway (AB&A), it is preserved and operated by the Wilmington and Western Railroad (WWRC).

== History ==
=== Revenue service ===
No. 58 was built in October 1907 by the Baldwin Locomotive Works for the Atlanta, Birmingham and Atlantic Railway (AB&A). In 1926, the bankrupt AB&A was acquired by the Atlantic Coast Line Railroad (ACL), who reorganized the railway as the Atlanta, Birmingham and Coast Railroad (AB&C) the next year and No. 58 was renumbered to No. 27.

No. 27 was subsequently sold again to the United States Army Transportation Corp, who renumbered it to No. 6961, respectively. No. 6961 was sold in 1947 to the Virginia Blue Ridge Railway (VBR), where it was renumbered to No. 4 and used to pull train loads of titanium dioxide and aplite out of the mines the Railway served. In May 1951, No. 4 was acquired by the Mead Corporation of Lynchburg, Virginia and was renumbered to No. 300.

In 1963, Malcolm Ottinger purchased No. 300 for use to haul tourist trains on his Valley Forge Scenic Railroad (VFS) alongside 4-6-2 No. 425, until it was retired in the late 1960s.

=== Excursion service ===
In 1973, No. 300 was purchased by Brian Woodcock, who was the president of the Wilmington and Western Railroad (WWRC) in Delaware. The engine's road number was reverted to its original, No. 58, and it was subsequently put into public storage. In 1976, No. 58 participated alongside 4-4-0 No. 98 in the United States Bicentennial Celebrations of Hockessin, Delaware.

In December 1988, No. 58 was moved to the Avondale Railroad Center for display alongside some Ex-Pennsylvania Railroad MP54's. No. 58 was placed on static display at the Avondale Railroad Center in January 1989 and would remain on display for the next nine years. In December 1997, Brian Woodcock outright donated No. 58 to the WWRC, with the wish that the engine be restored to operating condition.

No. 58 was moved out of the Avondale Railroad Center on January 24, 1998 where restoration work on No. 58 official began. After eleven months of work, No. 58 was test fired on November 6, 1998. No. 58 returned to service on November 28, 1998 where it hauled the annual Santa Clause special during the 1998 holiday season, since then, the engine became the second official steam motive power on the line and operated alongside No. 98 between the Ex-Baltimore and Ohio line between Wilmington and Hockessin. On May 23, 1999, No. 58 became dedicated as "The Veteran's Locomotive". On September 30, 2000, No. 58 traveled to Amtrak's Wilmington station to participate in the annual Riverfront Transportation Festival.

On November 11, 2007, the locomotive celebrated its 100th birthday. In 2013, the engine was removed from service to undergo its required Federal Railroad Administration (FRA) 1,472-day inspection and overhaul. The overhaul took four years to complete before No. 58 re-entered service in 2017. Simultaneously, No. 98 was taken out of service to undergo a similar overhaul, leaving No. 58 as the sole-operating steam engine on the WWRC in the present time.

In February 2025, No. 58 was temporarily removed from service after the WWRC suspended operations indefinitely due to needed of equipment repairs. (Note: Attributed to multiple sources:)

In October 2025, tourist operations resumed with No. 58 eventually returning to service hauling excursion trains.

== See also ==
- Baldwin Locomotive Works 26
- Canadian National 7312
- Central Railroad of New Jersey 113
- Union Pacific 4466
- United States Army 4039

== Bibliography ==
- Vazquez, Gisela (2008). The Wilmington and Western Railroad. Images of Rail (1st ed.). Arcadia Publishing. ISBN 978-0-7385-5362-7.
