= Louisiana Eastern Railroad =

Proposed railroad in Louisiana, United States

Overview
- Headquarters: New Orleans, Louisiana
- Reporting mark: LE
- Locale: Midwestern to Gulf Coast, United States
- Dates of operation: 1947–1963

Technical
- Track gauge: 4 ft 8 1/2 in (1,435 mm) standard gauge
- Length: 31 miles (50 km)

The Louisiana Eastern Railroad (reporting mark LE) was a proposed railroad that was to serve as an alternate line bypassing the congested rail lines in New Orleans, Louisiana. The railroad was envisioned by Paulsen Spence in the late 1940s and early 1950s. While most US railroads had begun replacing their steam locomotives with diesel locomotives, the LE was to operate exclusively with steam locomotives collected by Spence over time. Spence died in 1961, and the railroad never fully materialized.

== History ==
Paulsen Spence, an entrepreneur who had patented steam valves, started a gravel industry in 1947, with a rail spur leading to an area which he had named "Sharon Junction" where the spur connected to the Illinois Central Railroad's main line. This spur, known as the Comite Southern, was operated using retired steam locomotives and served as the basis for the Louisiana Eastern.

In 1950, Spence purchased another industrial spur, known as the Gulf & Eastern Railroad, which also served a gravel plant and connected to the Illinois Central at Shiloh, Louisiana. This line had been formed in 1946 and already operated a retired steam locomotive.

These two lines were combined under the title of the Louisiana Eastern Railroad and soon upgraded with heavier rails and reconfigured switches. Throughout the 1950s, Spence continued to collect steam locomotives retired from mainline railroads switching to diesel power. Over thirty steam locomotives of various designs were acquired, transporting gravel to the Illinois Central and offering occasional excursion trains for railfans who admired the railroad's use of steam engines until the 1960s.

== The railroad's demise ==
Paulsen Spence died in 1961, and thus his vision of a through freight line operated with steam locomotives had never been realized. Upon his death, there had been very little interest by others in maintaining the railroad and its engines. The remaining equipment was largely scrapped over the course of 1962-63, the final steam locomotive to operate on the road was no. 11, former Abilene & Southern 2-8-2 No. 20, which last ran in June, 1963, and scrapped shortly thereafter.

== Preserved equipment ==
Of the collection of over thirty steam locomotives, only four survive today. These engines are:

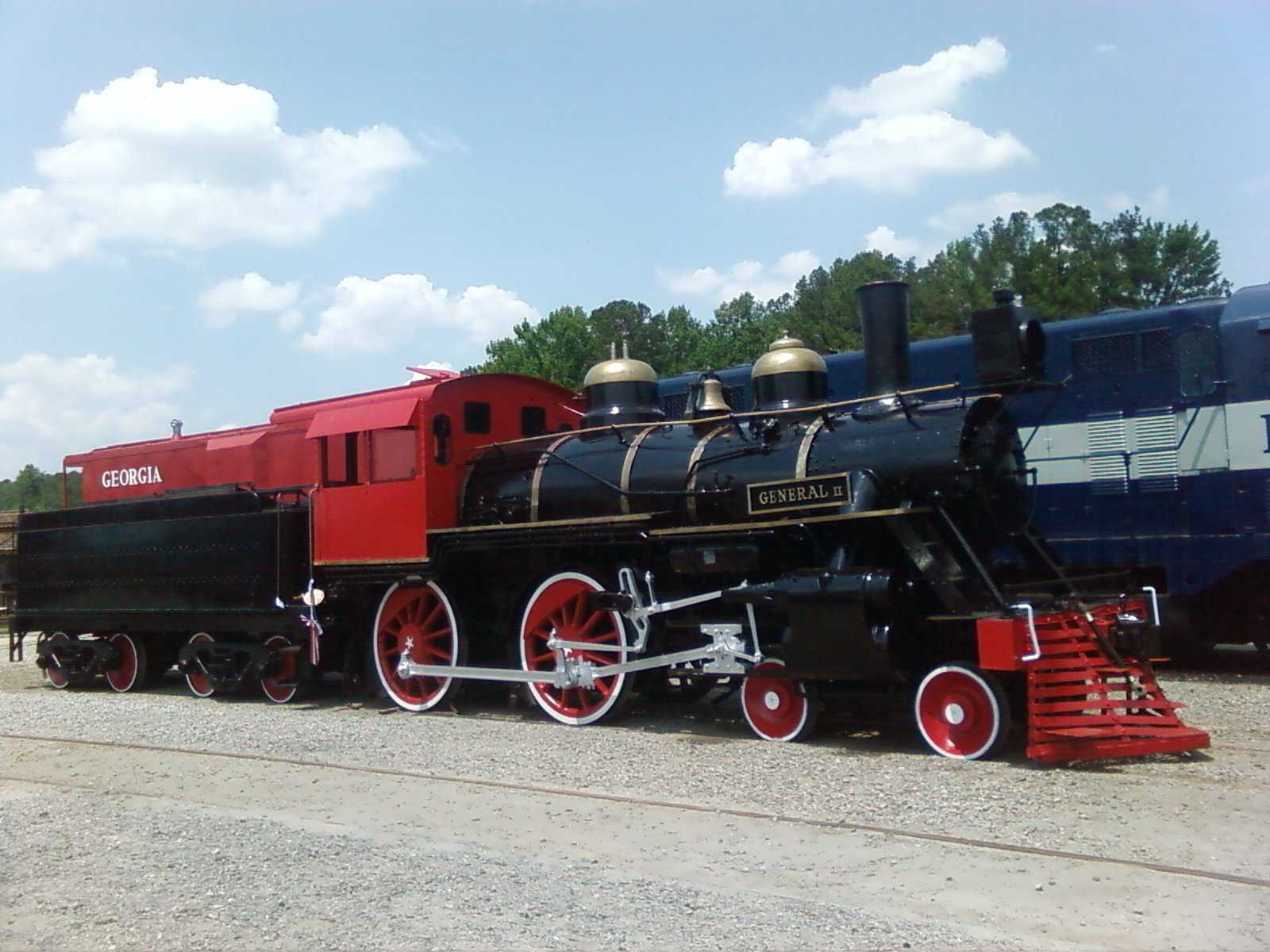
Stone Mountain #104, formerly Louisiana Eastern #1 on display at the Southeastern Railway Museum since 2008.

- Number 1, 4-4-0, built by the Baldwin Locomotive Works in 1919 as Red River and Gulf number 104. Was sold to the Stone Mountain Scenic Railroad where it was given the name "General II" and operated until 1986. The locomotive was donated to the Southeastern Railway Museum in 2007, where it is now displayed.

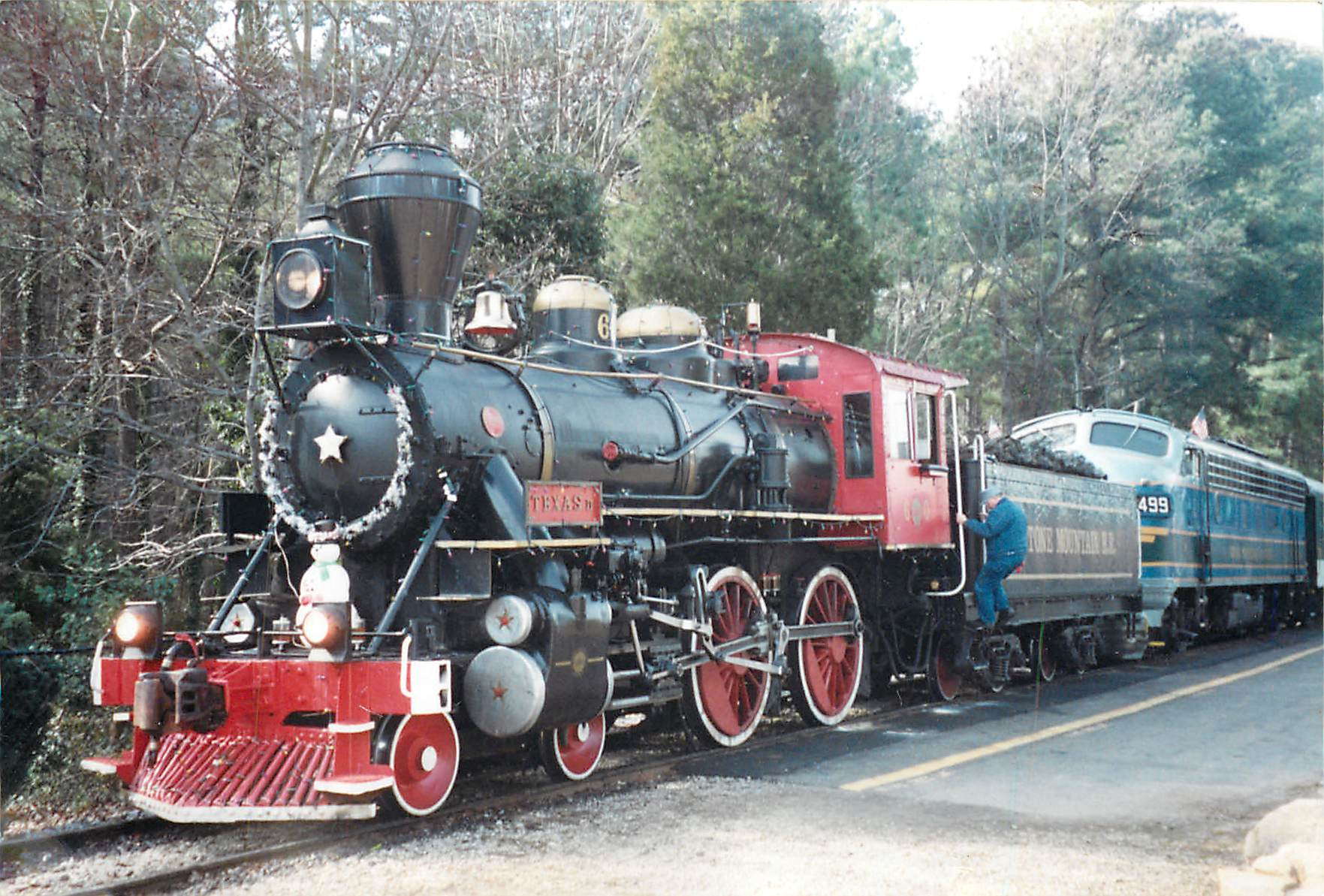
Stone Mountain #60, formerly Louisiana Eastern #2 on the Stone Mountain Scenic Railroad being pushed by a diesel.

- Number 2, 4-4-0, built by Baldwin in 1923 as San Antonio and Aransas Pass Railway number 60. Became the second number 1 after no. 1's sale before being sold to Stone Mountain as well. The engine was named the "Texas II" and operated until 1984. The locomotive was donated to the Gulf and Ohio Railways in 2012, where it is awaiting restoration for use on that railroad's Three Rivers Rambler tourist operation.

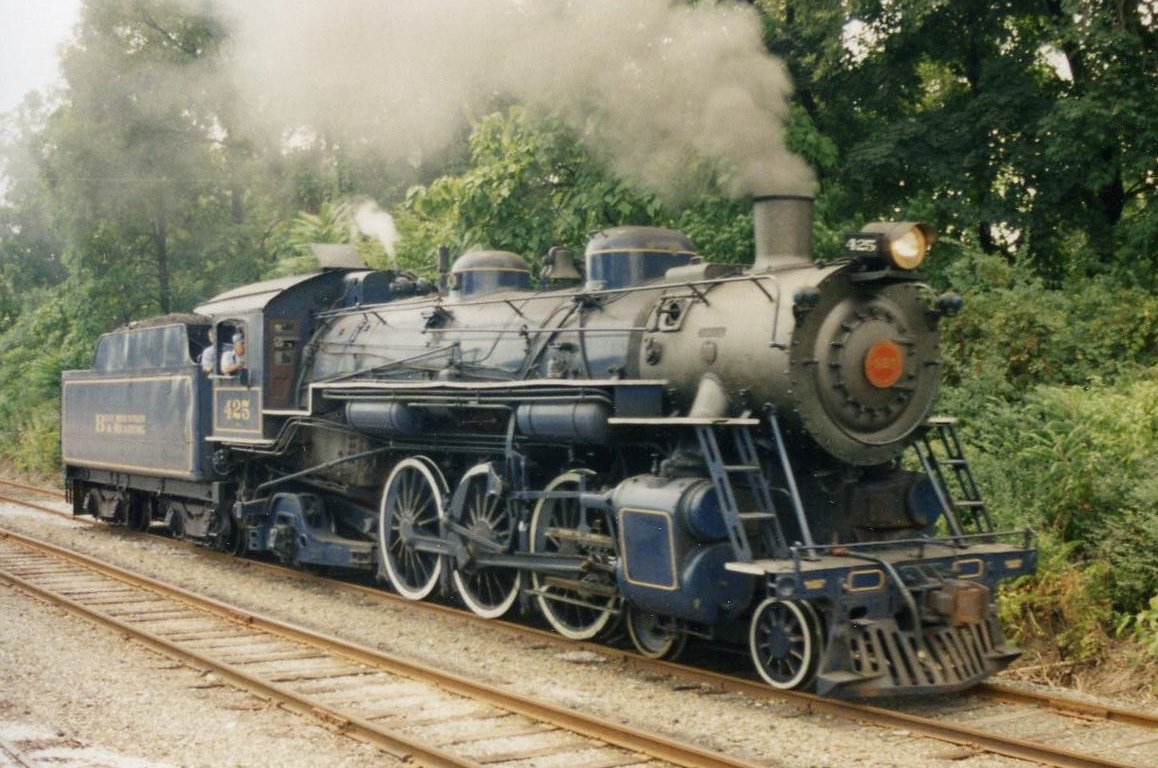
Former Louisiana Eastern #4, now hauling passenger trains as Reading Blue Mountain and Northern Railroad 425.

- Number 2, later 4, 4-6-2, built by Baldwin in 1928 as Gulf Mobile & Northern number 425. Owned by the Reading Blue Mountain and Northern Railroad where it operates on special occasions.

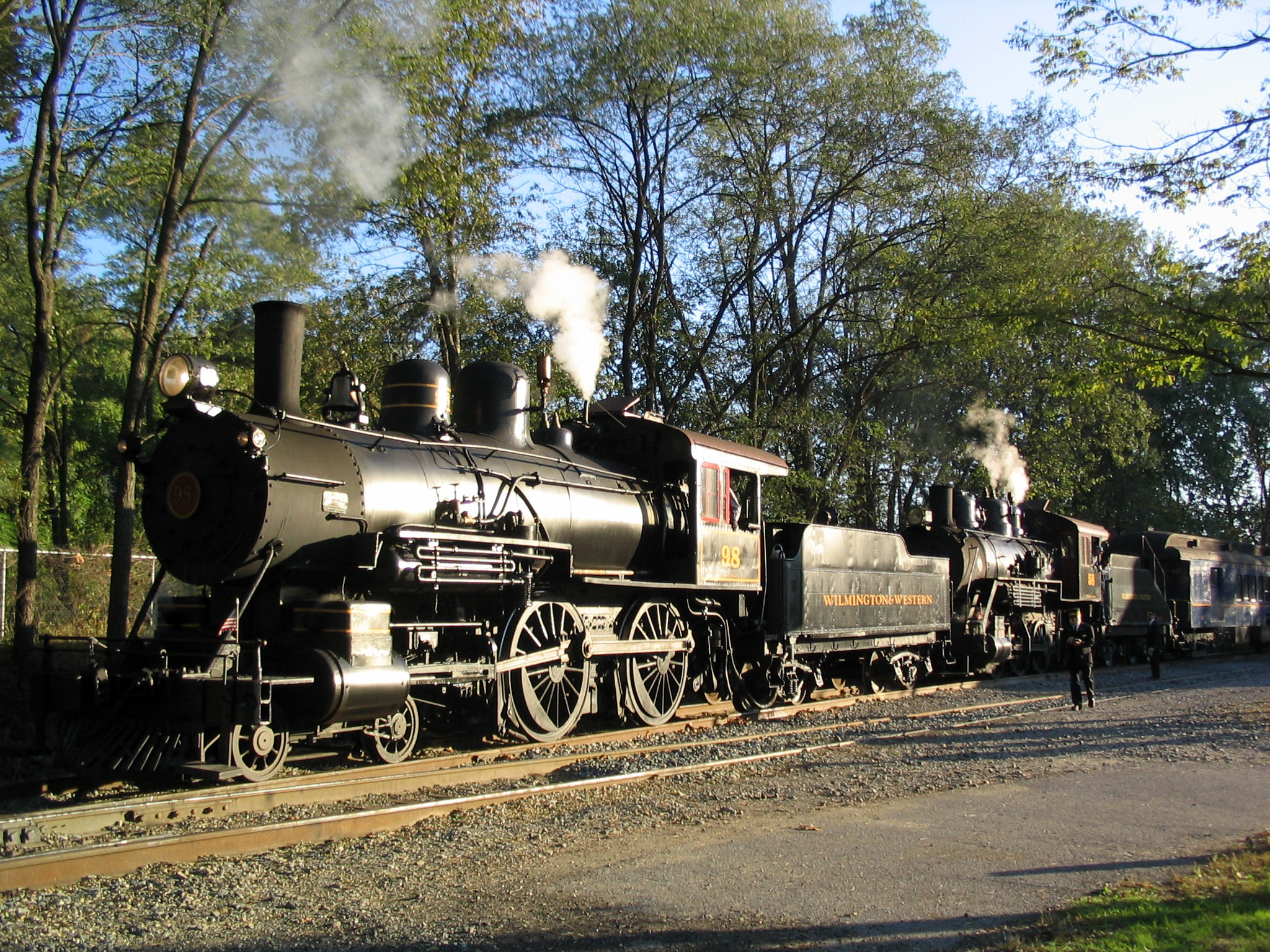
Former Louisiana Eastern #98, returned to service after a massive overhaul, double-heading with Wilmington and Western #58.

- Number 98, 4-4-0, built by ALCO in 1909 as a Mississippi Central locomotive of the same number. Owned by the Wilmington and Western Railroad where it operates on select weekends.

== Bibliography ==
- Vazquez, Gisela (2008). The Wilmington and Western Railroad. Images of Rail (1st ed.). Arcadia Publishing. ISBN 978-0-7385-5362-7.
