= Stone Mountain Scenic Railroad =

Standard gauge railroad in Georgia, USA

Coordinates: 33.810483°N 84.145231°W

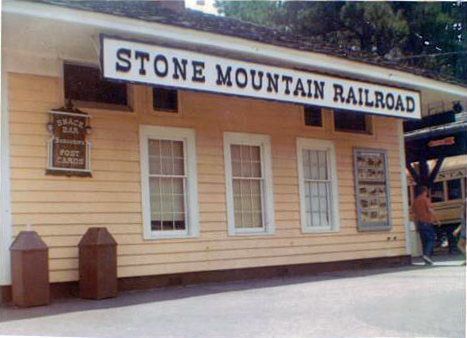
- Stone Mountain Scenic Railroad depot (1971 photograph)

Overview
- Headquarters: Stone Mountain, Georgia
- Reporting mark: SMPX
- Locale: Southeastern United States
- Dates of operation: 1962–present

Technical
- Track gauge: 4 ft 8 1/2 in (1,435 mm) standard gauge
- Length: 3.88 mi (6.24 km)

The Stone Mountain Scenic Railroad (SMRR) is a standard gauge heritage railroad that circles the perimeter of Stone Mountain Park in a loop, and provides views of the mountain en route.

== History ==
The railroad utilizes what was originally an industrial spur built in 1869 by the Stone Mountain Granite Company to serve quarries at the foot of the Stone Mountain, with a connection to the Georgia Railroad's main line in Stone Mountain Village. The railroad later started an excursion service to the mountain. The spur was later abandoned, leaving the right of way in place (with the rails removed). In 1960, Stone Mountain Scenic Railroad, Inc. was formed to construct a tourist railroad encircling the mountain, operating it under lease from the Stone Mountain Memorial Association (a state-operated association established in 1958 for developing and managing the mountain as a park). Between 1961 and 1963, two miles of former quarry trackage were rebuilt, followed by construction of additional new trackage to complete the road around the perimeter of the mountain. The mileage of the circuit around the mountain is advertised as being 5 miles (8.0 km) long, however, the actual mileage is 3.88 miles (6.24 km).

The Stone Mountain Memorial Association assumed full operation of the railroad in 1981. As the steam locomotives came in need of major repairs, the road opted to withdraw them and operate diesels. In 1987, the spur connecting the mountain trackage to the CSX main line was restored, and the railroad hosted several visiting trains, including Savannah and Atlanta Railway steam locomotive number 750.

In January 1998, the Memorial Association leased operations of the railroad and the other attractions within the park to Herschend Family Entertainment, operators of the Silver Dollar City theme park in Branson, Missouri and the Dollywood theme park in Pigeon Forge, Tennessee.

In 2004, the trackage connecting the railroad to the main line was dismantled and the spur truncated to just before the bridge spanning Robert E. Lee Boulevard within the park's premises. The trackage and decking were removed, though the bridge's girders remain, and the right of way to the west of the bridge was converted to a pedestrian trail, while the railroad continues to use the remaining track to reverse the train's direction. In 2011, major upgrades of the track, passenger cars, and diesel locomotives were performed. The diesel locomotives received new motors and other upgrades, as well as a new paint scheme. The steam locomotives received some cosmetic restoration at this time as well. The railroad had de-accessioned its last remaining steam locomotives in early 2013, and currently owns and operates diesels exclusively.

== Locomotives ==
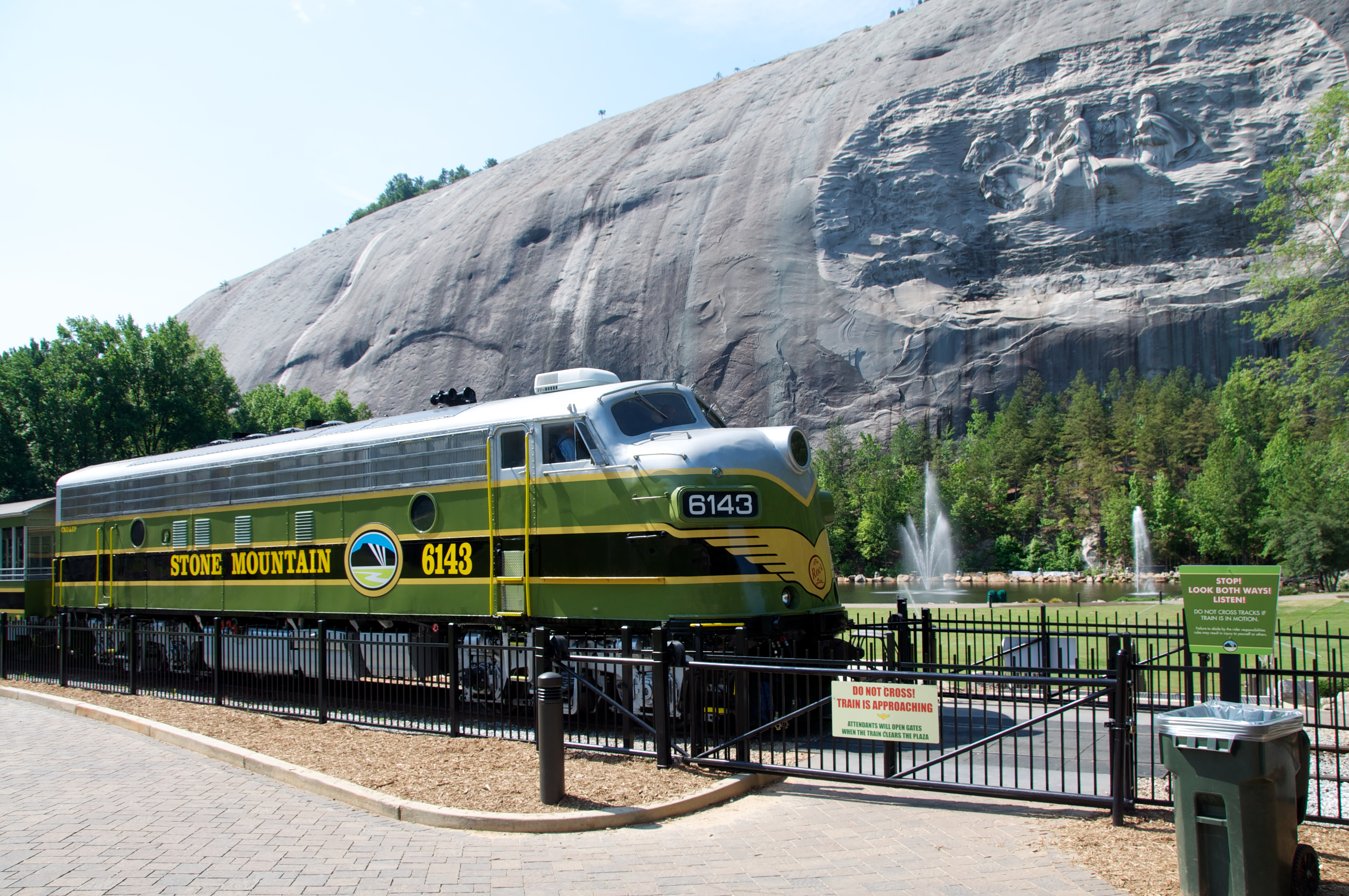
EMD FP7A #6143 in 2012.

Stone Mountain originally had three steam locomotives, the "General II," "Texas II," and "Yonah II." The SMRR named the engines after the famous engines of The Great Locomotive Chase, and were given nineteenth century style smokestacks and headlights. Despite these modifications, the engines, having been built between 1919 and 1927, still have noticeably modern appearances, with larger proportions than their ancestors and have more advanced cylinders, valve gear, and other modern applications. While steam engines ceased running in the 1980s, they continued to "pull" trains for some time. In these instances, one of the steam engines was coupled in front of a diesel which, while disguised as a baggage car or auxiliary tender, would push the engine. The diesel's controls were placed in the cab of the engine and air piped from the diesel's main reservoir to allow the steam engine's whistle to sound. Aside from the whistle, the steam locomotive remained inactive, with the diesel being the train's sole motive power.

In the late 1980s and early 90s, the railroad supplemented its GP7 and GP9 diesels with ones inherited from the recently dissolved New Georgia Railway, which have pulled trains regularly since. At that time, the steam engines would only be pushed on special occasions, and no attempt was made to disguise the diesel behind it. The practice of pushing the steam engines ended in 2002, and they remained within the yard until being donated to other tourist railroads or museums, the first leaving the railroad in 2008, followed by the remaining two in 2013.

The Stone Mountain Railroad currently has the following locomotives:

Current Locomotive Roster
Number	Type	Image	Builder	Built	Status	Built For	Notes
6143	FP7A		EMD	Nov 1950	Operational	Cincinnati, New Orleans and Texas Pacific	Acquired from the New Georgia Railroad in 1994, wearing Southern inspired livery. Extensively rebuilt in 2011 with following upgrades: -1500 HP 567BC prime mover replaced with 2000 HP 645E model. -New main and auxiliary generators. -New air compressor. -Full 26L air brake system. -Rebuilt trucks with D87 traction motors. -Dash-2 control mechanisms and cab layout. -Air conditioning and new power generators for passenger cars. -Central of Georgia inspired livery with black and green in gold lining substituting the CoG maroon and blue with gold lining.
6147	FP7A		EMD	Nov 1950	Operational	Cincinnati, New Orleans and Texas Pacific	Renumbered SOU 3499, acquired from New Georgia Railroad in 1994, wore a Central of Georgia inspired livery. Extensively rebuilt in 2011, receiving same upgrades and livery as 6143 above.
5896	GP7		EMD	1953	Operational	Chesapeake and Ohio Railway	Rebuilt in 2011 with same cosmetic upgrades as 6143 and 6147. 5896 still has her 567 prime mover, but has had several power assemblies replaced over her time at Stone Mountain.

=== Former equipment ===
Former Locomotive Roster
Number	Type	Image	Builder	Built	Built For	Notes
#1910, The Dinky	Converted streetcar		St. Louis Car Company	1925	Johnstown Traction Company	Johnstown Traction Company streetcar no. 358, acquired in 1962 and fitted with a diesel motor to allow operation without overhead wires. Currently operating at the Trolley Museum of New York, Kingston, New York.
51	25-ton Diesel Switcher		General Electric		Georgia Power	Currently operating at the ISG Resource's concrete plant in Lakeville, Minnesota.
#42, The Mary Payne	45-ton Diesel Switcher		General Electric		United States Marine Corps	Current whereabouts unknown.
6661	GP9		EMD	1956	Chesapeake and Ohio Railway	Later sold by C&O subsidiary, Baltimore and Ohio Railroad, to the Atlanta, Stone Mountain and Lithonia Railway before acquisition by the Stone Mountain Railroad. Scrapped in 2011.
Baggage car/tender 1114	EMD SW1		EMD	1946	Boston and Maine Railroad	Acquired by Stone Mountain in 1973 to assist the steam locomotives on gradients, later fitted with a false baggage car shell when the railroad began to dieselize so as to make the steam locomotive placed in front appear to be pulling the train. Sold in 1995 to become Standridge Color's #3 in Social Circle, GA.
104 General II	4-4-0		Baldwin Locomotive Works	Aug 1919	Red River and Gulf Railroad	Acquired from the Louisiana Eastern Railroad in 1962. Withdrawn 1986 due to boiler and mechanical issues, being the last engine to operate under steam at the park. Donated to the Southeastern Railway Museum in Duluth, GA in 2007, and moved to the museum the following year, where it is currently on display.
60 Texas II	4-4-0		Baldwin Locomotive Works	May 1922	San Antonio and Aransas Pass Railway	Acquired from the Louisiana Eastern Railroad in 1963. Withdrawn 1983 due to boiler and mechanical issues, though it continued to occasionally "pull" the train while pushed by a diesel until 2002, and remained within the rail yard thereafter. Sold to the Gulf and Ohio Railways in Knoxville, Tennessee in 2012 and moved in March, 2013. Currently undergoing restoration to operating condition for use on the Gulf and Ohio's Three Rivers Rambler tourist train operation.
110 Yonah II	2-6-2		Vulcan Iron Works	Jul 1927	McRae Lumber & Manufacturing Co.	Sold to the Beechwood Band Mill in Cordele, Georgia in 1930, then again in 1933 to the Cliffside Railroad, where it operated until dieselization in 1962. Acquired from the Swamp Rabbit Railroad in Cleveland, South Carolina in 1969, and operated until 1982. Placed on display at the Memorial Depot in 1984, engine was donated to the New Hope Valley Railway in Bonsal, North Carolina in 2012, and the engine was moved the following year. The engine is currently on display while funds are being raised for its restoration to operation.
3525 Big Dixie	0-8-0		Baldwin Locomotive Works	Sep 1922	Illinois Central Railroad	Acquired by Stone Mountain in 1967, sold shortly thereafter when its size and short wheelbase proved to be too heavy for the railroad's sixty pound rails at the time. Currently on display at Tanglewood Park in Clemmons, NC.
349	4-4-0		Baldwin Locomotive Works	Jun 1891	Savannah & Western Railroad, Central of Georgia Railway	Never placed in service on the Stone Mountain Scenic. Purchased in 1963 as a possible contender for the Texas II, but resold when San Antonio and Aransas Pass #60 became available and was found to be in better condition. Ultimately purchased by the Tennessee Valley Railroad Museum, from which currently on loan to Children's Hospital at Erlanger.

== See also ==
- Dollywood Express
- Frisco Silver Dollar Line
