= Frisco Silver Dollar Line =

Railroad at Silver Dollar City

Coordinates: 36°40′14″N 93°20′13″W

Frisco Silver Dollar Line Steam Train
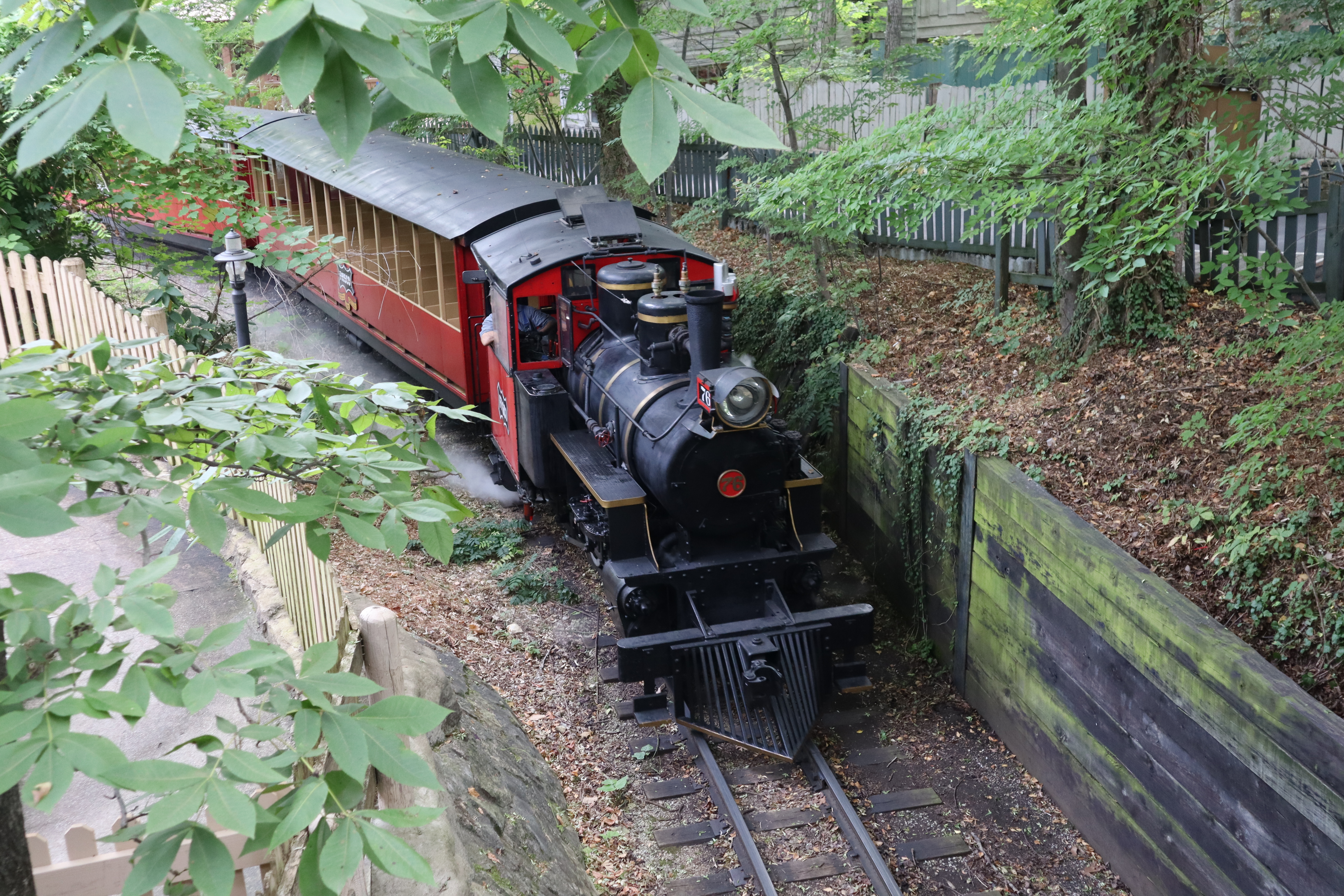
- FSDL Engine No. 76.

Overview
- Locale: Silver Dollar City Amusement Park, Branson, Missouri
- Dates of operation: 1962–present

Technical
- Track gauge: 2 ft (610 mm)
- Length: 1.6 miles

Other
- Website: www.silverdollarcity.com/theme-park/Attractions/Rides/Frisco-Silver-Dollar-Line-Steam-Train

The Frisco Silver Dollar Line is a 2 ft (610 mm) narrow-gauge heritage railroad and amusement park attraction located in the Silver Dollar City amusement park in Branson, Missouri. The railroad opened on May 27, 1962, making it the oldest operating ride at Silver Dollar City. It is themed after American railways in the 1800s, more recently and specifically off the Frisco. The ride includes an 1800s themed train depot, a water tower, a trestle overpass bridge, a train wreck scene, a staged train robbery, a tunnel, a rectangular shaped roundhouse and an at-grade railroad crossing. It consists of a total of seven steam locomotives, with four of them in operating condition as of 2023. The railroad is 1.52 miles long.

In the middle of the ride, guests experience a show where uneducated train robbers Alphie and Ralphie Bolin try their best to rob the train, but guests are saved just in time by the conductor, who was tricked into searching for "Yankees". During the Old Time Christmas festival at the park, the train is decked-out in lights and becomes the "Frisco Sing-Along Steam Train". The robbery act is replaced by grandpa telling the story of Christmas.

== Locomotives ==
The Frisco Silver Dollar Line consists of a total of seven steam engines, of which four are used as of 2023. All four of them fire on No. 2 diesel fuel as their fuel source. They are 610 mm (2 foot) narrow-gauge steam locomotives. The Frisco Silver Dollar Line also has two sets of four passenger cars, which are always pulled by one of the operating steam engines. There is an “old” and “new” set of passenger cars, with the old ones being built in the 1970s, and the new ones being built from 2011 to 2016. The current roster goes as follows:

Number	Type	Wheel arrangement	Builder	Built	Model	Serial number	Former	Status	In service	At Silver Dollar City	Notes
7 (82)	Steam	0-4-0T	Orenstein & Koppel (O&K)	1934	50hp	12480	Peter Buescher & Sohn	Storage	No	Since the 1960s	Posed as "Old Engine 82" from the 1960s until 2022.
9 (76)	Steam	4-4-2	Davenport Locomotive Works	1922	Unknown	1900	Henry Ford, Wayne County Board of Roads, Adventure Town Theme Park	Display	No	Since Winter 1962	Nicknamed the Davenport. First engine to operate on the Frisco Silver Dollar Line on May 27, 1962. Originally numbered 76. On display at the Frisco Silver Dollar Line Depot. Named 'Belle Starr' but not shown on engine. Incorrectly labeled “6”.
13	Steam	0-4-0T	Orenstein & Koppel (O&K)	1938	70hp	13168	Kies und Schotterwerke Nordmark	Storage	No	Since 1967	Originally numbered 1. Operated as a 2-4-0T from 1967 to early 2017. Taken out of service indefinitely in early 2018. Currently awaiting a major overhaul outside of the roundhouse. Temporarily used as a spare parts donor for its sister locomotive, No. 14.
14	Steam	0-4-0T	Orenstein & Koppel (O&K)	1938	70hp	13169	Kies und Schotterwerke Nordmark, Northfield & Cannon Valley Railroad	Operational	Yes	Since 2016, entered service in March 2019	Originally numbered 2. Originally owned by Jim Machacek for his Northfield & Cannon Valley Railroad in Northfield, Minnesota. Debuted at Silver Dollar City on March 20, 2019.
43	Steam	0-4-0T	Orenstein & Koppel (O&K)	1934	50hp	12503	Peter Buescher & Sohn,	Operational	No	Since 1965	Operated as a 2-4-0T from 1965 to 2018. Silver Dollar City's oldest operating steam engine. Taken out of service in early 2023 for an extensive running gear overhaul.
76	Steam	0-4-0T	Ceskomoravska Kolben-Danek	1940	B600-70	1880	Hans Vattern AG	Operational	No	Since the 1960s–1970s, entered service in the 1980s	Operated as a 2-4-0T from the 1980s to 2018. Taken out of service in early 2014 for a major overhaul and returned to service on November 7, 2015.
504	Steam	0-4-0	Ceskomoravska Kolben-Danek	1941	B600-70	2028	Hans Vattern AG, Northfield & Cannon Valley Railroad	Operational	Yes	Since 2016, entered service in June 2018	Originally owned by Jim Machacek for his Northfield & Cannon Valley Railroad in Northfield, Minnesota. Converted into a tender engine in the 1970s. Debuted at Silver Dollar City on June 18, 2018. Temporarily taken out of service in early 2020 and underwent several repairs during the 2021 off-season. Returned to service on March 17, 2021 and is now fully operational. Silver Dollar City's youngest steam engine.
2825	Diesel	(B)	Plymouth Locomotive Works	1960s–1970s	DDT	Unknown	Northfield & Cannon Valley Railroad, Carpenter Steel Co.	Operational	Yes	Since 2016	Originally owned by Jim Machacek for his Northfield & Cannon Valley Railroad in Northfield, Minnesota. Purchased by Silver Dollar City in 2016 alongside Nos. 504 and 14. Used for switching and maintenance-of-way operations.

== Early years ==
According to the Herschends in "Jack and Pete Tell it All", the train was purchased in the winter of 1962. It was originally coal-fired, but set the surrounding forestry on fire, so it was converted to oil. The Frisco Silver Dollar Line opened on Sunday, May 27, 1962.

== Frisco’s involvement ==
The St. Louis–San Francisco Railway, also commonly known as the “Frisco,” was a standard-gauge railroad which operated in the general area. It supplied construction materials such as rails and ties when this line was being built in 1962. Perhaps for these reasons, the trains sport the Frisco name and logo. However, this was never an actual Frisco rail line and the steam locomotives were never actual rolling stock on the Frisco.

== Incidents ==
On October 26, 2022, at around 6:00 pm, a train led by engine #504 derailed causing three of the four cars and the locomotive's tender to tip over on their right side. Six guests and one crew member were injured. Following the derailment, the railroad was closed for the remainder of the 2022 season pending an investigation by both Silver Dollar City and Missouri state investigators. The railroad later had a soft reopening on March 24, 2023 and an official reopening on March 29, 2023.

On May 25, 2023, a second derailment occurred behind the Fireman's Landing area of the park causing the rear two cars to detach from the other cars and engine #14. One passenger was reported to possibly have a minor injury, but declined medical assistance. The railroad reopened on May 28, 2023 after an investigation.

== See also ==
- Dollywood Express
- Rail transport in Walt Disney Parks and Resorts
- Stone Mountain Scenic Railroad
