= Canadian National 1551 =

Preserved CN class H-6-g 4-6-0 locomotive

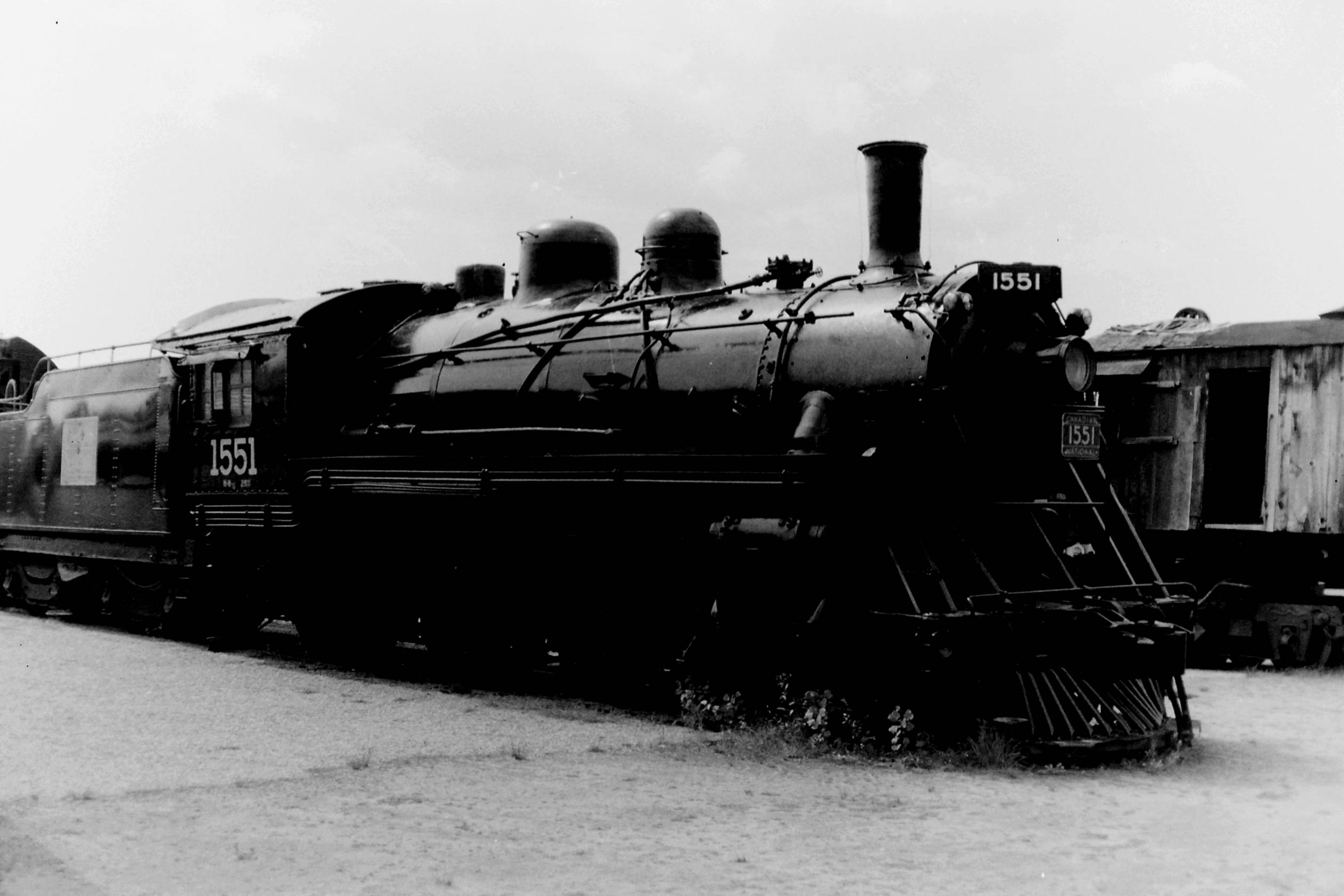
- No. 1551 on display at Steamtown, U.S.A., in Bellows Falls, Vermont, August 1970
Type and origin
- Power type: Steam
- Builder: Montreal Locomotive Works
- Serial number: 50778
- Model: H-6-g
- Build date: April 1912
Specifications
- Configuration
  - Whyte: 4-6-0
  - UIC: 2′C
- Gauge: 4 ft 8 1/2 in (1,435 mm)
- Driver dia.: 63 in (1,600 mm)
- Wheelbase: 54.25 ft (16.54 m)
  - Engine: 24.83 ft (7.57 m)
  - Drivers: 14.50 ft (4.42 m)
- Length: 63 ft 6 1/2 in (19.37 m)
- Width: 10 ft 8 in (3.25 m)
- Height: 14 ft 10 1/2 in (4.53 m)
- Adhesive weight: 133,000 lb (60 t)
- Loco weight: 173,000 lb (78 t)
- Tender weight: 124,000 lb (56 t)
- Total weight: 297,000 lb (135 t)
- Fuel type: Coal
- Fuel capacity: 10 long tons (10 t)
- Water cap.: 5,000 imp gal (23,000 L; 6,000 US gal)
- Boiler pressure: 180 psi (1,200 kPa)
- Cylinders: Two, outside
- Cylinder size: 22 in × 26 in (560 mm × 660 mm)
- Valve gear: Walschaerts
- Valve type: Piston valves
- Loco brake: Air
- Train brakes: Air
- Couplers: Knuckle
Performance figures
- Tractive effort: 30,560 lbf (135.9 kN)
- Factor of adh.: 4.64
Career
- Operators: Canadian Northern Railway; Canadian National Railway; Ohio Central Railroad System
- Class: H-6-g
- Numbers: CNoR 1354; CN 1551; OHCR 1551
- Retired: 1958 (revenue service); 2003 (1st excursion service)
- Preserved: September 1961
- Restored: October 1988
- Current owner: Age of Steam Roundhouse
- Disposition: On static display, awaiting restoration

Canadian National 1551 is a H-6-g class 4-6-0 "Ten-wheeler" type steam locomotive, built in 1912 by the Montreal Locomotive Works (MLW) for the Canadian Northern Railway (CNoR). It is preserved at the Age of Steam Roundhouse in Sugarcreek, Ohio.

== History ==
=== Revenue service ===
The locomotive was built in April 1912 by the Montreal Locomotive Works (MLW) as Canadian Northern Railway No. 1354. It kept that number after the CNoR merged into the Canadian National Railway (CN), but when diesels arrived, it was renumbered as No. 1551 in October 1956. The locomotive hauled heavy freight and passenger trains throughout Ontario and Montreal until it was retired from revenue service in 1958.

In September 1961, No. 1551 was purchased by F. Nelson Blount, who sent it for display at the Edaville Railroad in Massachusetts, United States, then added it to his collection at Steamtown, U.S.A, in Bellows Falls, Vermont. After Blount's death in 1967, the collection was moved to Scranton, Pennsylvania.

=== Excursion service ===
In January 1986, the locomotive was purchased by Jerry Jacobson in a trade for Jackson Iron & Steel Company No. 3. Over the next two years, Jacobson and his crew restored the engine to operating condition, completing the work in October 1988. For the next 15 years, No. 1551 hauled excursion trains for Jacobson's Ohio Central Railroad System (OHCR) and occasionally other lines. One of its engineers described the locomotive as an easy engine to work.

In September 1997, No. 1551 operated for the OC's Steam Fest '97 event alongside the railroad's other steam locomotive, Canadian Pacific 1293. T-1 Reading 2100 also participated in the event but was the only locomotive not to be fired up for the weekend occasion.

In 2003, the locomotive was taken out of service to undergo major repairs. In 2011, the engine, along with the rest of Jacobson's steam locomotive collection, were moved into the new Age of Steam Roundhouse in Sugarcreek, Ohio, United States. Today, No. 1551 is on static display inside the roundhouse, where it awaits a planned major rebuild and return to service.
