= Reading Blue Mountain and Northern 425 =

Preserved American 4-6-2 locomotive

Reading and Northern 425
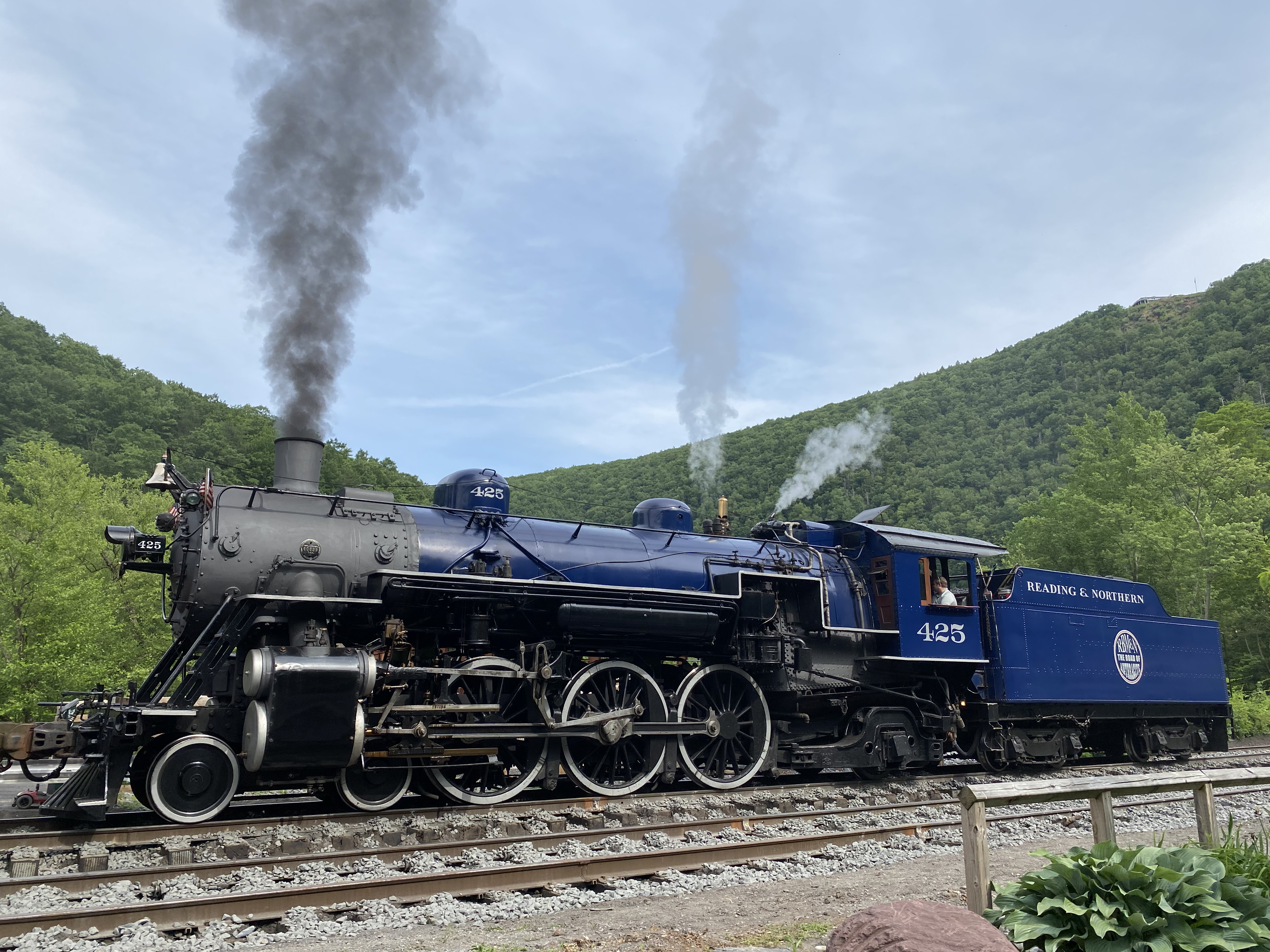
- No. 425 idling at Jim Thorpe, Pennsylvania on June 18, 2021
Type and origin
- Power type: Steam
- Builder: Baldwin Locomotive Works
- Serial number: 60339
- Build date: January 1928
- Rebuild date: May 2008
Specifications
- Configuration
  - Whyte: 4-6-2
  - UIC: 2'C1'
- Gauge: 4 ft 8 1/2 in (1,435 mm)
- Driver dia.: 69 in (1.753 m)
- Wheelbase: 65.79 ft (20.05 m)
  - Engine: 33.08 ft (10.08 m)
  - Drivers: 12.17 ft (3.71 m)
- Axle load: 43,000 lb (20,000 kg)
- Adhesive weight: 129,000 lb (59,000 kg)
- Loco weight: 213,000 lb (97,000 kg)
- Tender weight: 182,000 lb (83,000 kg)
- Total weight: 395,000 lb (179,000 kg)
- Fuel type: Coal
- Fuel capacity: 18 t (18 long tons; 20 short tons)
- Water cap.: 8,500 US gal (32,000 L; 7,100 imp gal)
- Firebox
  - Grate area: 54.20 sq ft (5.035 m^{2})
- Boiler pressure: 210 psi (1.45 MPa)
- Heating surface
  - Firebox: 196 sq ft (18.2 m^{2})
- Cylinders: Two, outside
- Cylinder size: 22 in × 28 in (559 mm × 711 mm)
- Valve gear: Walschaerts
- Valve type: Piston valves
- Loco brake: Air
- Train brakes: Air
- Couplers: Knuckle
Performance figures
- Maximum speed: 75 mph (121 km/h)
- Tractive effort: 35,000 lb (15.9 tonnes)
- Factor of adh.: 3.72
Career
- Operators: Gulf, Mobile and Northern Railroad; Gulf, Mobile and Ohio Railroad; Louisiana Eastern Railroad; Valley Forge Scenic Railroad; Reading, Blue Mountain and Northern Railroad
- Class: G-1
- Number in class: 1st of 2
- Numbers: GM&N 425; GM&O 580; LE 2; LE 4; VFS 425; RBM&N 425
- Retired: 1950 (revenue service); 1970 (1st excursion service); October 13, 1996 (2nd excursion service)
- Restored: October 1, 1950 (1st excursion service); August 1984 (2nd excursion service); December 29, 2007 (3rd excursion service)
- Current owner: Reading, Blue Mountain and Northern Railroad
- Disposition: Undergoing 1,472-day inspection and overhaul

Reading Blue Mountain and Northern 425 is a G-1 class 4-6-2 "Pacific" type steam locomotive, built in January 1928 by the Baldwin Locomotive Works (BLW) for the Gulf, Mobile & Northern Railroad (GM&N). After the GM&N was consolidated into the Gulf, Mobile & Ohio (GM&O) in 1940, the locomotive was renumbered No. 580 and served in passenger service before being retired in 1950. The locomotive is currently owned and operated by the Reading, Blue Mountain and Northern Railroad (BM&N), based out of Port Clinton, Pennsylvania in excursion service. At the end of 2022, No. 425 was taken out of service for its mandatory Federal Railroad Administration (FRA) 1,472-day inspection and overhaul.

== History ==
=== Revenue service ===
No. 425 was built in January 1928 by the Baldwin Locomotive Works (BLW) of Philadelphia, Pennsylvania as the first of two G-1 4-6-2 Pacifics ordered, the second being No. 426, for the Gulf Mobile and Northern (GM&N) to replace their four older Pacifics, which were sold to the Louisville and Nashville Railroad (L&N). Nos. 425 and 426 were designed with 69 in (1,753 mm) drivers, 35,000 lb (15.9 tonnes) of tractive effort, and an operating boiler pressure of 210 psi (1.45 MPa). They were assigned to haul the GM&N's unnamed overnight passenger train between Jackson, Tennessee and Mobile, Alabama. In September 1940, they would later become Gulf, Mobile and Ohio (GM&O) Nos. 580 and 581, respectively until they were both retired in 1950.

=== 20th century excursion service ===
Quickly after retirement, Nos. 580 and 581 were purchased by Paulson Spence for his Louisiana Eastern Railroad (LE) on October 1, 1950 and renumbered as Nos. 2 and 3, respectively as part of a large fleet of steam engines which Spence had acquired over time and hauled trains of gravel and occasional passenger trips, No. 2 would later be renumbered to No. 4. When Spence died in 1961 and the Louisiana Eastern collapsed, No. 3 was sold for scrap (along with most of the line's engines), while No. 4 was purchased in August 1962 by Malcolm Ottinger and became the main power of tourist trains on the Valley Forge Scenic Railroad of Kimberton, Pennsylvania, where it also regained its original number, 425. It continued to haul excursions trains their for eight years until the Valley Forge Scenic Railroad (VFS) closed in 1970.

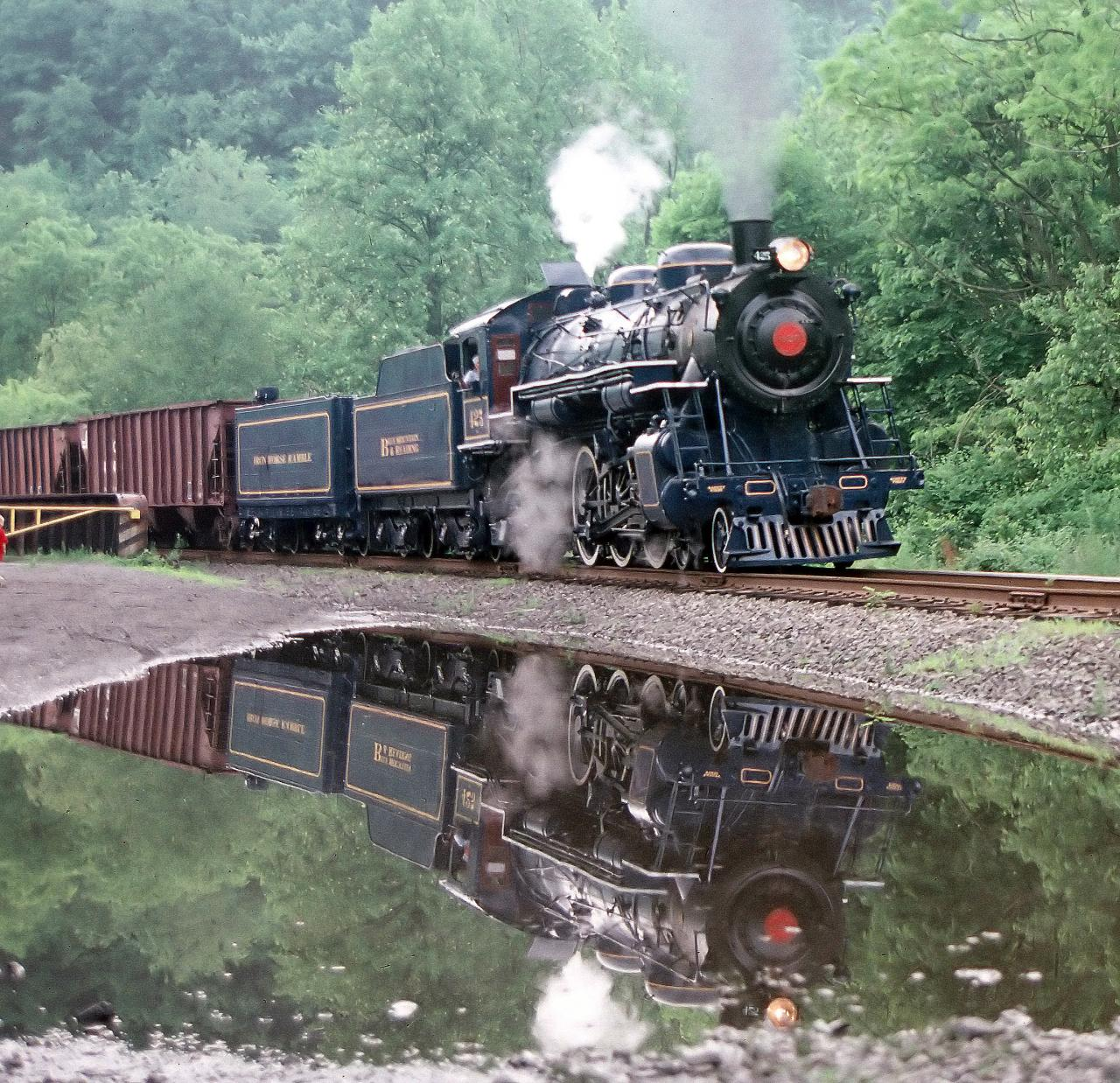
No. 425 pulling a coal train at Port Clinton, PA in June 1992

In June 1975, it was purchased by Brian Woodcock and others to haul tourists on the Wilmington & Western Railroad (WWRC) and was moved into their shops for storage in December 1975, although it never operated on the line due to its high axle load, it would occasionally be fired up to provide steam and pressure to several passengers coaches for excursions and would also be brought out of storage for display for special events. In August 1984, it was sold to Andrew J. Muller, Jr. to power tourist trains on the newly formed Blue Mountain and Reading Railroad (RBM&N) based out of Temple, Pennsylvania. The high-stepping Pacific was later joined by Reading T-1 4-8-4 “Northern” 2102 in 1986. The Blue Mountain & Reading became much larger with the purchase of nearly 300 miles of former Conrail trackage throughout the early 1990s. The railroad was renamed to Reading, Blue Mountain and Northern (often shortened to Reading & Northern). In 1995 both names officially merged. Having more tracks gave the 425 and 2102 a large number of new areas to roam, and the engines became based out of the railroad's own headquarters of Port Clinton. It performed a doubleheader with the No. 2102 in 1988.

In 1992, No. 425 was repainted into a new dark royal blue paint scheme as opposed to its original black livery. The No. 425 locomotive made a guest appearance at the Steamtown National Historic Site Grand Opening in July 1995, along with several other steam locomotives including Baldwin Locomotive Works 26, Canadian Pacific 2317, Canadian National 3254, New York, Susquehanna and Western 142, and Milwaukee Road 261, and pulled a number of excursion trips out of Scranton, Pennsylvania. 425's last excursion was the Tamaqua Fall Fest on October 13, 1996, when steam operations on the RBM&N began to cease until 2008.

=== 21st century excursion service ===
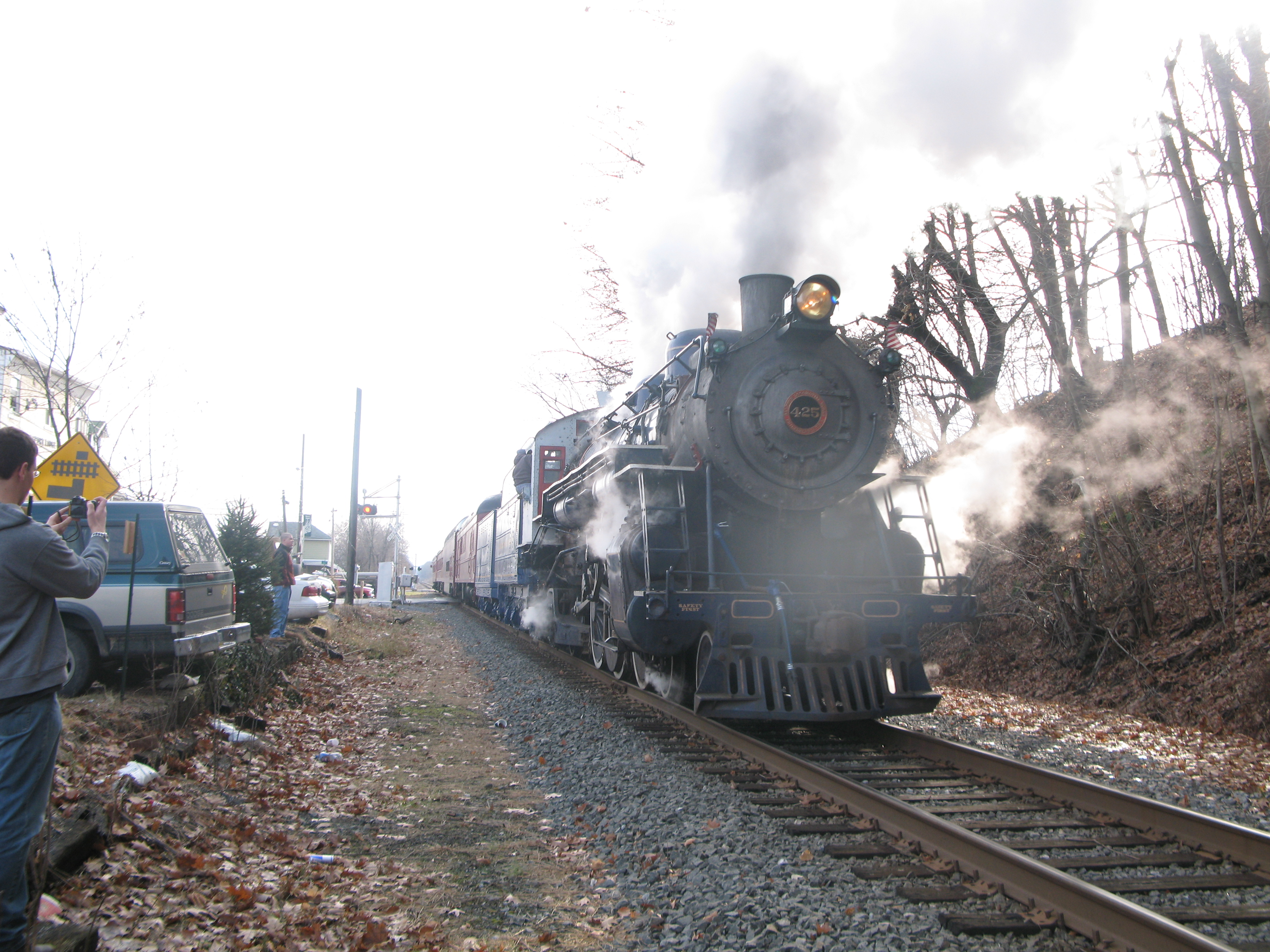
No. 425 doing a test run in Leesport, Pennsylvania on December 29, 2007, after being restored

After nearly a decade of storage, rebuild work began to bring No. 425 back to service. Following two years of restoration, No. 425 returned to operation on December 29, 2007, in a partially repainted appearance. Another test run was done on May 10–11, 2008 where the engine debuted in a new lighter blue color and an above-centered headlight that came from a Delaware Lackawanna and Western 4-8-4 Northern. It made its return to excursion service in June 2008 on a round trip from Port Clinton to Jim Thorpe, a run it would make often. The RBMN's new star made many trips to Jim Thorpe and other locations over the next three years, with employee runs, tourist trains on the Lehigh Gorge Scenic Railway, and a featured attraction of the 2010 NRHS Convention.

After three successful seasons of excursions, Reading & Northern 425 was taken out of service to be repaired with the pilot and trailing trucks rebuilt by the Strasburg Rail Road, including conversion from plain bearings to more efficient roller bearings, rebuilding of the air compressor, a new blower and replacing the bottom part of the smokebox. Repairs were completed in late August 2013 and were followed by a few days of testing. The 425's first public outing after her overhaul was a return to Steamtown for the first time in 18 years for its annual Railfest.

No. 425 would later operate on numerous trips out of Port Clinton, and also double headed with recently restored Central Railroad of New Jersey 0-6-0 #113 on several trips. In August 2015, No. 425 was pulling regular passenger trains when it visited Jim Thorpe, Pennsylvania, meeting Nickel Plate Road 765 on a Norfolk Southern 21st Century Steam excursion. At the same time, No. 425 was repainted in a dark midnight blue paint scheme with black wheels and whitewalls. On February 15 and 16, 2016, No. 425 participated in a Lerro Productions photo charter.

On September 4, 2017, No. 425 struck a car on the tracks leaving a parking lot in Jim Thorpe when the car driver ignored loud whistle warnings, and failed to stop at the tracks; the driver was uninjured.

On August 13, 2022, No. 425 double headed with No. 2102 for the first time since 1988 to pull the Iron Horse Rambles train from Reading to Jim Thorpe. After running its last excursion trains such as the Autumn Leaf and the Santa Claus Special in November and December 2022, respectively, No. 425 was taken out of service for its mandatory Federal Railroad Administration (FRA) 1,472-day inspection.

== See also ==
- Atlanta and West Point 290
- Canadian Pacific 972
- Canadian Pacific 2816
- Pennsylvania Railroad 1361
- Santa Fe 1316
- Soo Line 2719
- Wilmington and Western 98

== Bibliography ==
- Wilson, Michael J. (October 2022). "Four and a Quarter". Trains. Vol. 82, no. 10. Kalmbach Media. pp. 12–19.
- Vazquez, Gisela (2008). The Wilmington and Western Railroad. Images of Rail (1st ed.). Arcadia Publishing. ISBN 978-0-7385-5362-7.
