= Landenberg Junction (Delaware) =

Railroad junction in Delaware

Coordinates: 39°43′49″N 75°37′8″W

Landenberg Junction is a railroad junction in Elsmere, New Castle County, Delaware.

The first rail line to be constructed through the area was the (original) Wilmington and Western Railroad, between Wilmington, Delaware and Landenberg, Pennsylvania, which opened in 1872. Foreclosed and reorganized as the Delaware Western Railroad, it was acquired by John W. Garrett, president of the Baltimore and Ohio Railroad (B&O), in 1881 so that its charter rights could be used for a new B&O route to Philadelphia. The Delaware Western was merged into the Baltimore and Philadelphia Railroad in 1883, which opened its new main line in 1886. The new line west toward Baltimore, Maryland connected with the former Wilmington and Western at a point just west of Centreville Road, known as Landenberg Junction. The existing line toward Wilmington became part of the new main line, while the line from the junction northwest to Landenberg became the Landenberg Branch.

The B&O subsequently built its Wilsmere Yard along the main line east of Landenberg Junction. When the B&O main line was double-tracked in 1902, a crossover and interlocking were installed at the junction, now known as West Junction, telegraphic call sign "WJ". Declining passenger traffic on the Landenberg Branch led to the removal of the interlocking and crossover in 1926, and the branch was re-connected to the westbound yard lead at Wilsmere rather than the main line. The Landenberg Branch was gradually truncated to Hockessin, Delaware and was sold to the present-day Wilmington and Western Railroad in 1982. The junction now connects the Wilmington and Western and CSX Transportation's Philadelphia Subdivision.
