= Canadian Pacific 2317 =

Preserved CP G3c class 4-6-2 locomotive

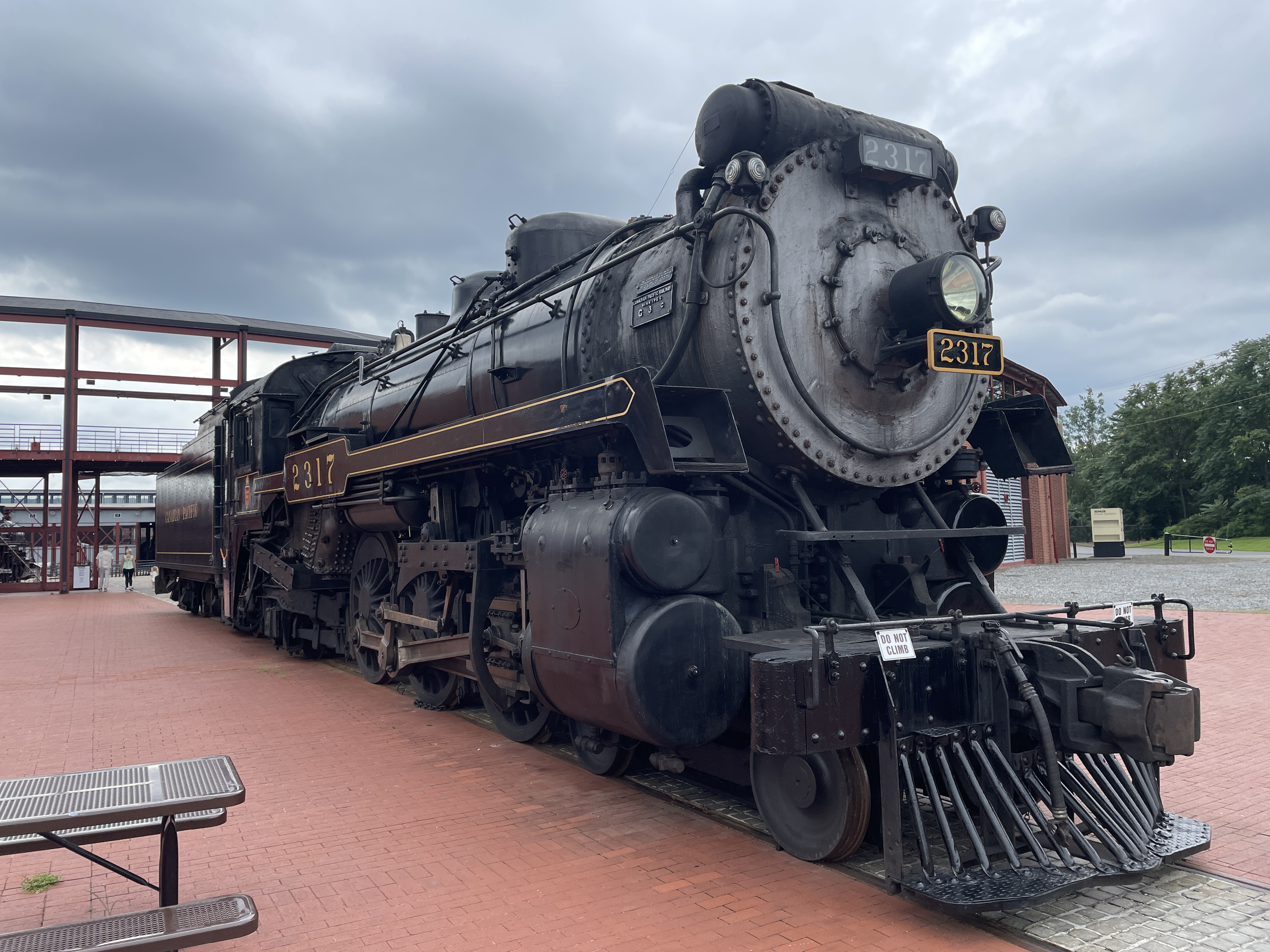
- CP No. 2317 at Steamtown in July 2023
Type and origin
- Power type: Steam
- Builder: Montreal Locomotive Works
- Serial number: 64541
- Build date: June 1923
Specifications
- Configuration
  - Whyte: 4-6-2
  - UIC: 2′C1′ h2
- Gauge: 4 ft 8 1/2 in (1,435 mm)
- Driver dia.: 75 in (1,905 mm)
- Adhesive weight: 192,000 lb (87.1 tonnes)
- Loco weight: 317,000 lb (143.8 tonnes)
- Fuel type: Coal
- Fuel capacity: 17 long tons (17 t)
- Water cap.: 10,000 imp gal (45,000 L; 12,000 US gal)
- Boiler pressure: 200 lbf/in^{2} (1.38 MPa)
- Cylinders: Two, outside
- Cylinder size: 25 in × 30 in (635 mm × 762 mm)
- Valve gear: Walschaerts
- Valve type: Piston valves
- Loco brake: 26L
- Train brakes: Air
- Couplers: Knuckle
Performance figures
- Tractive effort: 46,600 lbf (207.29 kN)
Career
- Operators: Canadian Pacific Railway; Steamtown, U.S.A.; Steamtown National Historic Site
- Class: G-3c
- Numbers: CPR 2317; DLW 2317
- Retired: 1959 (revenue service); September 5, 2010 (excursion service)
- Preserved: November 1965
- Restored: October 1, 1978
- Current owner: Steamtown National Historic Site
- Disposition: On static display

Canadian Pacific 2317 is a G-3c class 4-6-2 "Pacific" type steam locomotive, built in June 1923 by the Montreal Locomotive Works (MLW) for the Canadian Pacific Railway (CP).

== History ==
=== Revenue service ===
No. 2317 was built in June 1923 by the Montreal Locomotive Works (MLW) as part of the G-3c subclass, pulling mainline passenger trains for the CP. It was known to be stationed in Winnipeg, Manitoba, for a good portion of its revenue career. After serving the CP for thirty-six years, the locomotive was retired from revenue service in 1959, and it was subsequently put into storage at Chalk River, Ontario.

=== Steamtown U.S.A ===
CP planned to move No. 2317 to the Canadian Railroad Historical Association's museum in Delson, Quebec. In November 1965, seafood magnate and steam locomotive enthusiast F. Nelson Blount purchased No. 2317 and moved it to Bellows Falls, Vermont, where the locomotive was added to Blount's Steamtown, U.S.A. collection. Upon arrival, the locomotive received a cosmetic restoration and was put on static display with Blount's other CP locomotives, including 4-4-4 No. 2929 and 4-6-4 No. 2816.

In March 1976, Steamtown crews began restoration work on No. 2317 with the hopes of bringing it back to service as quickly as possible, since a locomotive was needed to pull a bicentennial train known as the Vermont Bicentennial Steam Expedition, sponsored by the State of Vermont. Due to weight restrictions on some wooden bridges the train meant to run on, restoration work on No. 2317 was halted, and CP No. 1293 was selected to pull the train, instead.

The rebuilding process on No. 2317 resumed in June 1978, with the hopes of bringing it back to service by the Annual Railfan's Weekend in October of that year. On October 1, 1978, the locomotive was fired up for the first time in nineteen years, and it joined CP Nos. 1293 and 1246 in Steamtown's operating fleet. During this time, the locomotive was painted in the Canadian Pacific gray-blue and Tuscan red livery, a livery it never sported in revenue service. Throughout the 1983 operating season, the engine, along with Numbers 1246 and 1293, were used to pull multiple excursion trips to bid farewell to Steamtown's home in Bellows Falls, before the entire collection would be moved to Scranton, Pennsylvania, the following year. The locomotive arrived in Scranton on January 31, 1984, and it was subsequently fired up four days later for the "Grand Entrance Ceremony" on February 4.

=== Steamtown National Historic Site ===
The locomotive was fired up once more on September 1 for the first Steamtown excursion in Scranton, which ran on the former Delaware, Lackawanna and Western (DLW) mainline between Scranton and Elmhurst, Pennsylvania. In 1986, it was painted up in the DLW’s "Pocono Mountain Route" livery. It remained in this livery, until after the National Park Service (NPS) acquired Steamtown in 1987. The locomotive was subsequently repainted into the livery it wore in active service with CPR.

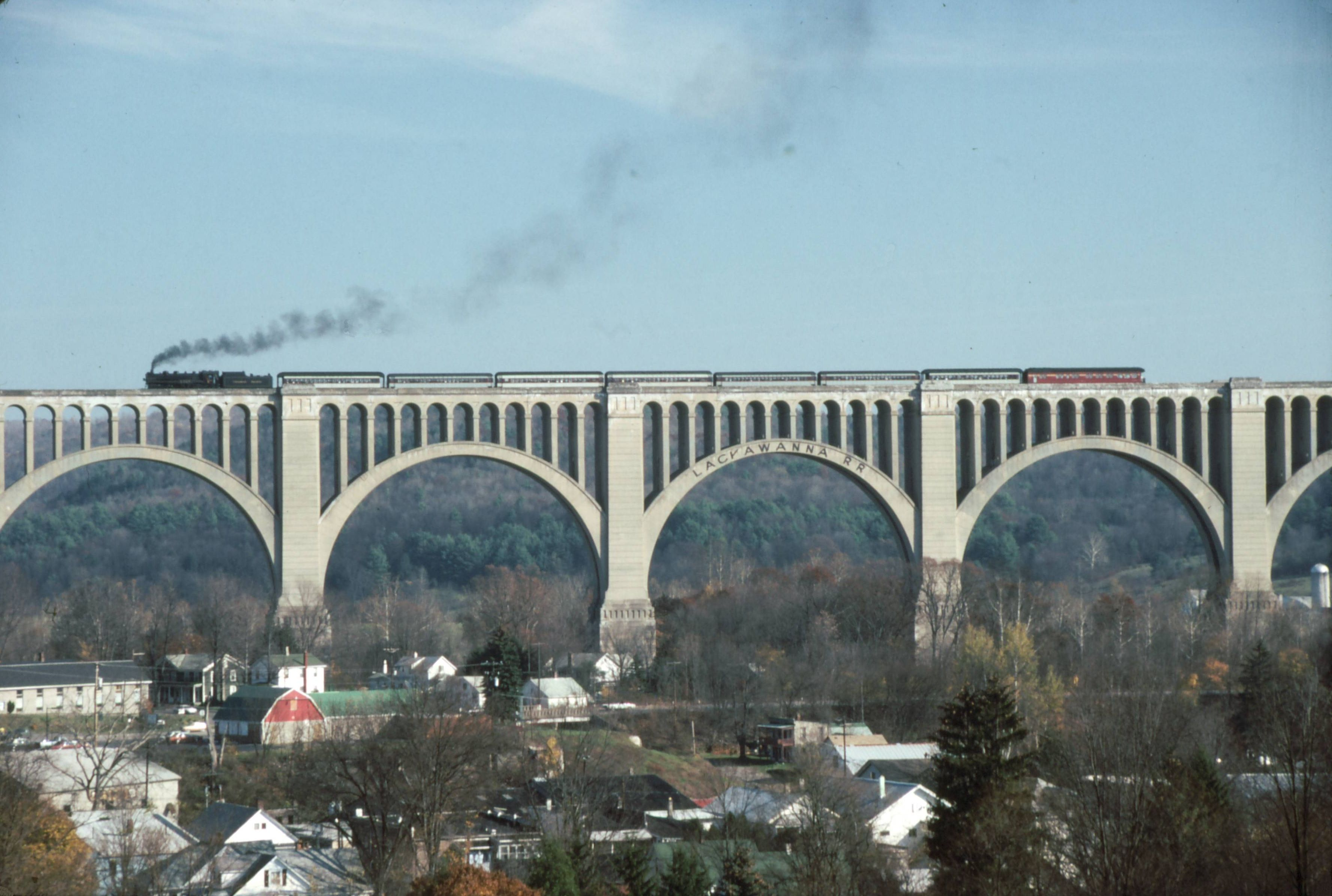
No. 2317 crossing the Tunkhannock Viaduct with an excursion train, on March 8, 2007

The locomotive was present at the grand opening of Steamtown National Historic Site (NHS) along with several other locomotives, including Baldwin Locomotive Works 26, Canadian National 3254, Reading Blue Mountain and Northern Railroad 425, New York, Susquehanna and Western 142, and Milwaukee Road 261, and the locomotive ran several excursion trains on the former DLW main line. The locomotive subsequently settled down as Steamtown’s main workhorse, and it would often pull Steamtown's excursions in tandem with No. 3254 until 2004, when problems with its trailing truck, dry pipe, and tires were discovered. Between 2004 and 2007, it only pulled the "Scranton Limited" yard shuttle trains. After new tires were installed in 2007, the locomotive was allowed to pull a few of the longer excursions to East Stroudsburg, Pennsylvania, and the Delaware Water Gap.

After the end of the 2009 operating season, it was used only sparingly as its flue-time was close to expiring. No. 2317 made its last run on September 5, 2010, during Steamtown's 2010 Lackawanna Railfest. After the event, the locomotive was placed into storage in the Steamtown Roundhouse where it is viewable to the public. Steamtown originally planned return No. 2317 to service again once the restoration of Boston and Maine 3713 was completed, but there are currently no plans on returning No. 2317 to service again anytime soon. The locomotive itself is in decent mechanical condition, but would require an Federal Railroad Administration (FRA) mandated 1,472-day inspection and repairs to operate again. Thus Boston and Maine 3713 will be replacing both No. 2317 and No. 3254 as Steamtown's main attraction for mainline excursion trains. As of 2026, the locomotive continues to remain on static display.

== Accidents and incidents ==
On February 4, 1982, the Steamtown shop and storage building collapsed under the weight of three feet of heavy, wet snow caused some damage to some locomotives, including No. 2317. However, the damage was not serious enough to remove it from excursion service.

On July 10, 1995, No. 2317 was returning a nine-car excursion carrying 572 passengers from Moscow to Scranton at 20 miles per hour, when it struck and killed two young boys (Paul Paskert, aged 12 and Anthony Paskert, aged 16), who were trying to pry one of their jammed ATVs from the tracks. The engineers were not able to see the boys on the tracks, and did not apply emergency brakes to avoid causing passengers to be thrown from their seats and injured. This was the 26th excursion run since the grand opening of the new park less than a month prior, and this was the first fatality Steamtown experienced since July 4, 1985, when an intoxicated woman was struck by a private venture train.

On October 27, 2003, No. 2317 was pulling a train through the Poconos at about 10 miles an hour, when the tender and three of the nine passenger cars jumped the tracks. Fortunately, no one was injured, because the train was traveling at such a slow speed. The accident occurred one mile outside Delaware Water Gap in an area known as Point of Gap.

== See also ==
- Canadian Pacific 1201
- Canadian Pacific 1238
- Canadian Pacific 2816

== Bibliography ==
- Chappell, Gordon (1991). Steam Over Scranton: The Locomotives of Steamtown (PDF) (1st ed.). National Park Service.
