= Wilmington and Western 98 =

Preserved 4-4-0 steam locomotive

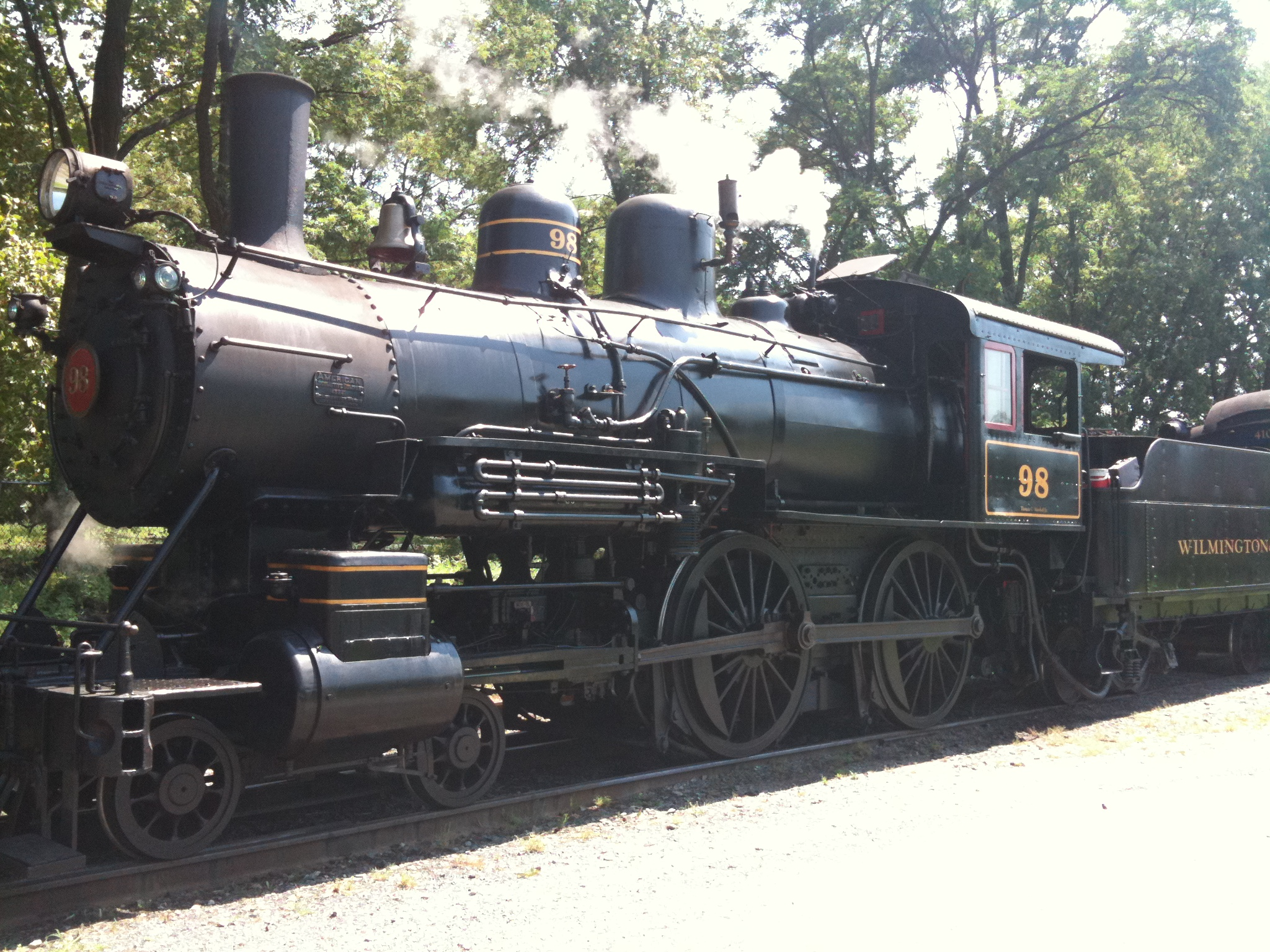
- No. 98 awaiting to depart, August 2009
Type and origin
- Power type: Steam
- Builder: American Locomotive Company (Schenectady Works)
- Serial number: 45921
- Build date: January 1909
Specifications
- Configuration
  - Whyte: 4-4-0
  - UIC: 2′B h2
- Gauge: 4 ft 8 1/2 in (1,435 mm)
- Driver dia.: 69 in (1.753 m)
- Wheelbase: 23.83 ft (726 cm)
  - Engine: 56.29 ft (1,716 cm)
  - Drivers: 8.50 ft (259 cm)
- Adhesive weight: 91,000 lb (46 short tons; 41,000 kg)
- Loco weight: 135,000 lb (68 short tons; 61,000 kg)
- Tender weight: 117,000 lb (59 short tons; 53,000 kg)
- Total weight: 252,000 lb (126 short tons; 114,000 kg)
- Fuel type: Coal
- Fuel capacity: 12 t (26,000 lb)
- Water cap.: 5,000 US gal (19,000 L; 4,200 imp gal)
- Boiler pressure: 180 psi (1.24 MPa)
- Cylinders: Two, outside
- Cylinder size: 19 in × 26 in (483 mm × 660 mm)
- Valve gear: Stephenson
- Valve type: Piston valves
- Loco brake: Air
- Train brakes: Air
- Couplers: Knuckle
Performance figures
- Tractive effort: 20,812 pounds-force (92.58 kN)
- Factor of adh.: 4.37
Career
- Operators: Mississippi Central; Comite Southern Railroad; Louisiana Eastern Railroad; Wilmington and Western Railroad
- Number in class: 1st of 1
- Numbers: MSCI 98; LE 98; SRC 98; WWRC 98
- Retired: December 1944 (1st revenue service); January 1960 (2nd revenue service)
- Restored: 1947 (1st revenue service); October 7, 1972 (1st excursion service)
- Current owner: Wilmington and Western Railroad
- Disposition: Undergoing 1,472-day inspection and overhaul

Wilmington and Western 98 is a preserved 4-4-0 "American" type steam locomotive, built in January 1909 by the American Locomotive Company's (ALCO) Schenectady Works in Schenectady, New York, for the Mississippi Central (MSCI). It is preserved and operated by the Wilmington and Western Railroad (WWRC).

== History ==
=== Revenue service ===
No. 98 was constructed by the American Locomotive Company’s (ALCO) Schenectady, New York plant in January 1909, and its design was based on the general 4-4-0 engine designs built from 1837 to the early 1900s. The Mississippi Central (MSCI) purchased No. 98 to pull their shortline passenger runs. No. 98 continued service for the MSCI until December 1944, when it was retired from revenue service and put into storage. In 1947, it was sold to steam engine collector Paulsen Spence for use on the gravel-hauling Comite Southern Railroad (CS), a 1,000-foot industrial spur, in Tangipahoa, Louisiana.

The engine was later shipped to the Illinois Central shops in McComb, Mississippi, for repairs. Spence intended to have No. 98 refurbished and used on the Comite Southern that same year, but the engine was unavailable, and the acquisition of the ex-ICRR 0-6-0 engines was necessary to fill in the immediate motive power needs on the Comite Southern. No. 98 was moved and stored at the Comite Southern, where it was eventually rebuilt by ICR shop employees who were working there on the weekends, it was placed into service where it worked hauling and shunting hopper cars in the gravel pits for several years until it was later assigned to Paulsen Spence's second railroad, the Louisiana Eastern Railroad (LE).

=== Excursion service ===
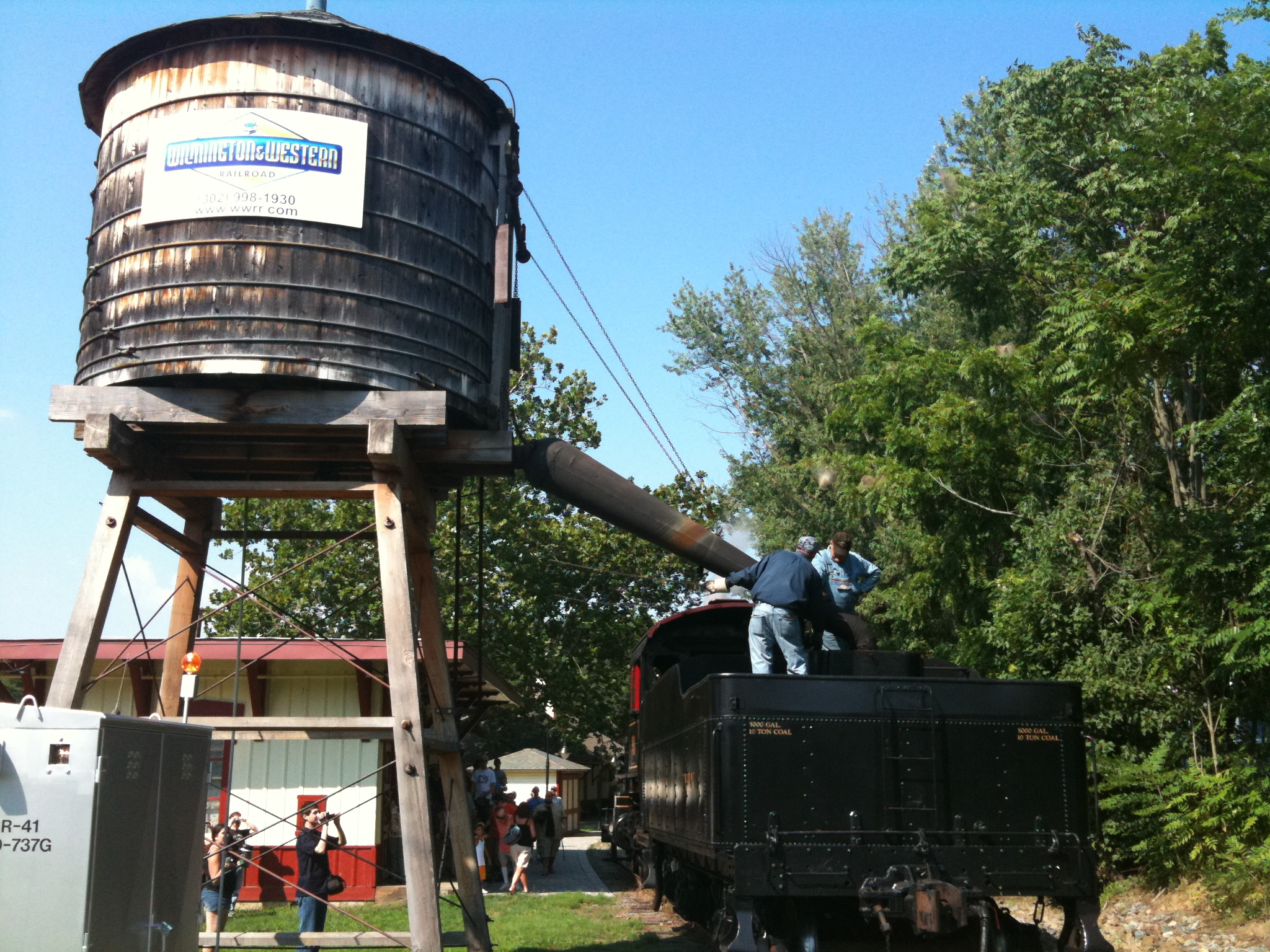
No. 98 taking on water at the WWRC depot, August 2009

Before Spence's death, No. 98 was purchased in January 1960 by Thomas C. Marshall and T. Clarence Marshall. The Marshall brothers planned on using No. 98 and other steam engines on a proposed tourist railroad called the Wilmington and Western Railroad (WWRC), that runs on an abandoned Baltimore and Ohio Railroad (BO) branch line in Wilmington, Delaware. While the branch was redeveloped for tourist operations, No. 98 was moved to the Strasburg Rail Road (SRC) in Pennsylvania for temporary storage in June 1961. There, Strasburg and Historic Red Clay Valley, Inc. originally intended to have No. 98 refurbished and operate on their trackage, even though it was temporarily re-lettered as Strasburg Railroad No. 98 while on display; the idea never came to fruition, and No. 98 never operated on Strasburg's trackage. In April 1964, No. 98 was moved from Strasburg to a shop complex in Wilmington, where it was stored at the Wilmington Industry Park from April 1964 to March 1966. Since its arrival, Historic Red Clay Valley Inc. occasionally brought No. 98 out from storage and placed it on display at Yorklyn Station and Greenbank Station for special events. W&W crews eventually began restoring the engine to working order in the late 1960s. Work was completed on October 7, 1972, as the engine made its first official test run.

It began pulling the WWRC's trains on October 8, 1972, between Wilmington and other small towns along the route. However, the run didn't go well as No. 98 suffered several derailments during the forward and return trip due to its driver wheels being 5'8 inches wide. As a result of this incident, No. 98 would be removed from service as wider tires would be installed on the locomotive's rear drivers to help give it smother traction when operating excursions. On May 3, 1973, No. 98 returned to steam with new driver wheels installed as it successfully made its excursion run from Hockessin and return to Greenbank.

Since its return to steam, No. 98 would serve the W&W as the road's primary motive power. In December 1977, the Marshall brothers outright donated the engine to the Historic Red Clay Valley Inc., and 5 years later, the railroad obtained complete control of the Ex-B&O rail line. In September 1978, No. 98 would be taken out of service for major repairs to its boiler and running gear, but was eventually back in service the following year on December 5, 1979. In 1985, No. 98 was present at the ceremony about Amtrak’s newly renovated station in Wilmington. On April 6, 1986, No. 98 suffered a massive dry pipe failure during a fire-up; it also suffered another derailment during its trip to Hockessin. It was revealed that the pony truck casting had failed and caused damage to the pilot. Crew members onboard No. 98 dropped the fire and had No. 98 re-railed and towed back to the Marshallton engine house using No. 8408, there, it went through a six-year rebuild until eventually being returned to service again on January 18, 1992. On May 9, 1992, No. 98 participated in the annual Transportation Day at Wilmington's Amtrak Station. On May 13, 1993, No. 98 again traveled to Wilmington's Amtrak Station, along with No. 4662, for the annual Transportation Day.

In December 1996, No. 98 was briefly repainted into its original Mississippi Central Railroad appearance with a centered headlight and relocation of the bell. No. 98 would be returned to its Wilmington and Western paint scheme in early 1997. Between 1997 and 2004, No. 98 underwent two extensive overhauls to bring its condition into compliance with FRA standards. In 2009, No. 98 turned 100 years old, and the WWRC hosted an event to honor the occasion. In 2017, No. 98 was removed from service to undergo a federally mandated Federal Railroad Administration (FRA) 1,472-day inspection, and the engine was then disassembled to allow the inspection to take place. As of 2026, overhaul work is still in progress.

== See also ==
- Canadian Pacific 29
- Leviathan (locomotive)
- Pennsylvania Railroad 1223
- The General (locomotive)
- The Texas (locomotive)
- Wilmington and Western 58

== Bibliography ==
- Vazquez, Gisela (2008). The Wilmington and Western Railroad. Images of Rail (1st ed.). Arcadia Publishing. ISBN 978-0-7385-5362-7.
