= Wilmington and Western Railroad =

Historic railroad in Delaware, United States

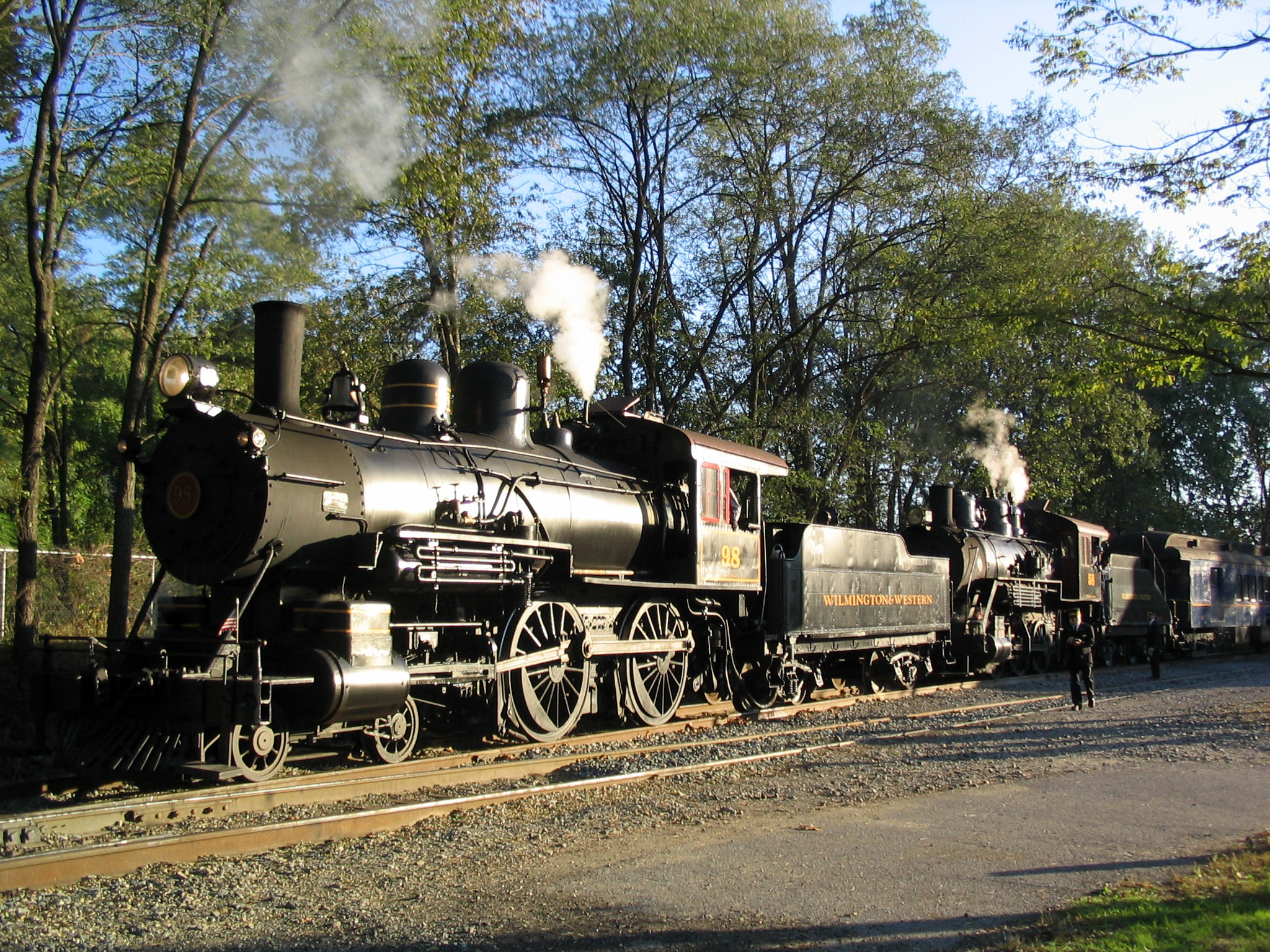
- No. 98 double-heading with No. 58 in October 2006

Overview
- Headquarters: Marshallton, Delaware
- Wilmington and Western Railroad
- U.S. National Register of Historic Places
- U.S. Historic district
- Location within Delaware Location within the United States
- Location: 2201 Newport Gap Pike, Wilmington, Delaware
- Coordinates: 39°44′17″N 75°37′58″W
- Area: 73 acres (30 ha)
- Built: 1867
- Architects: Wilmington & Western Railroad Co.
- NRHP reference No.: 80000932
- Added to NRHP: September 8, 1980
- Reporting mark: WWRC
- Locale: New Castle County, Delaware, USA
- Dates of operation: 1872–1877; 1966–present
- Predecessor: Baltimore and Philadelphia Railroad

Technical
- Track gauge: 4 ft 8 1/2 in (1,435 mm) standard gauge
- Length: 10.2 miles (16.4 km)

Other
- Website: www.wwrr.com

The Wilmington and Western Railroad (reporting mark WWRC) is a freight and heritage railroad in northern Delaware, operating over a former Baltimore and Ohio Railroad (B&O) branch line between Wilmington and Hockessin. The 10.2-mile (16.4 km) railroad operates both steam and diesel locomotives. It was added to the National Register of Historic Places as a national historic district in 1980. Wilmington & Western serves one customer for revenue service, and interchanges with CSX Transportation at Landenberg Junction, Delaware.

Wilmington & Western's General Motors Diesel-Electric SW1 locomotive no. 114 is the oldest diesel locomotive in routine scheduled service, having been built in February 1940.

== History ==
The Delaware and Chester County Railroad was incorporated in February 1867 to build from Wilmington in the direction of Parkesburg or Atglen, Pennsylvania, and was renamed the Wilmington and Western Railroad in March 1869, opening the line to Landenberg on October 19, 1872. A foreclosure sale in April 1877 produced the Delaware Western Railroad, which was incorporated in June 1877 and merged into the Baltimore and Philadelphia Railroad, a B&O subsidiary, in February 1883.

The B&O cut back the line to Southwood in the early 1940s and to Hockessin in the late 1950s. Historic Red Clay Valley, Inc. began operating steam tourist trains on weekends in 1966, reusing the old W&W name, and in August 1982 the W&W bought the branch from the Chessie System for $25,000 (equal to $83,405 today), which included Ex-B&O SW1 #8408 as a part of the purchase. Under the Historic Red Clay Valley Inc. the operations are managed by a Board of Directors, paid staff and a large number of volunteers.

In 1999, the rains of Hurricane Floyd caused considerable damage to the railroad. Two trestles were entirely destroyed by the flooding of Red Clay Creek, which also caused track washouts and damaged several other trestles. The two destroyed bridges were replaced by steel trestles, but the other timber trestles were simply repaired.

In 2003, Tropical Storm Henri struck the valley and produced an even more catastrophic flood. While the two steel bridges (and an iron trestle at Ashland) survived the flood, the remaining bridges were swept away or irreparably damaged. Despite the damage caused by these storms, the Wilmington and Western continued to operate on the remaining track, and replaced all of the destroyed bridges with steel trestles. The line officially reopened into Hockessin on June 30, 2007.

The railroad celebrated its 50th anniversary operating as a tourist railroad in 2016.

In February 2025, the board of directors announced that operations were suspended indefinitely due to needed equipment repairs. In April 2025, some of the volunteers with the organization protested near the boarding location of the line, citing lack of communication by the board to volunteers, lack of transparency, and the firing of the General Manager, Volunteer Program Manager, and Accounting Manager. Shortly after the protest, an announcement was posted to the organization's website stating that the board would have control of the railroad and the Roadmaster serving as the only employee. Via a post to Facebook, the organization stated that there were track, bridge and equipment repairs needed with a tentative return to service of later in the year. After multiple critical comments were posted to social media, the post and the organization's entire Facebook page were deleted.

On October 30, 2025, tourist operations resumed with a four day run of the Hayride Express special, followed by another run on November 8 during Veterans Day and the Santa Claus Express and the Holiday Lights Express on November 28.

== Excursions ==
Several different excursions are offered by the Wilmington and Western Railroad, running through the Red Clay Creek valley. Trains operate out of the Greenbank station near the southern end of the railroad. The railroad offers two regular excursions which run on weekends during the operating season. The Hockessin Clipper runs round-trip from Greenbank to the northern end of the line in Hockessin for a 2.5-hour trip with a 30-minute layover in Hockessin. The Yorklyn Limited runs round-trip from Greenbank to Yorklyn, just before Hockessin hill. The train briefly stops at the Mt. Cuba Picnic Center to allow passengers to disembark. This totals a 1.75 hour trip.

The Wilmington and Western Railroad also offers several special themed excursions. Some of the themed excursions include the Easter Bunny Express, the Fireworks Express on Independence Day, a dinner train called the Royal Blue Dinner Train, the Brews on Board train serving craft brews, the Civil War Skirmish Weekend, the Princess Express, the Superhero Express, the Autumn Leaf Special offering views of fall foliage, the Halloween Express, the Holiday Lights Express offering views of Christmas lights, and the Santa Claus Express around Christmas. Groups may also charter a caboose, parlor car, or entire train for an event. A caboose attached to the end of a regularly scheduled train may be rented for birthday parties.

== Equipment ==
=== Locomotives ===
Locomotive details
Number	Image	Type	Model	Built	Builder	Serial number	Status
58		Steam	0-6-0	1907	Baldwin Locomotive Works	31899	Operational
92		Steam	2-6-0	1910	Canadian Locomotive Company	930	Stored, awaiting restoration
98		Steam	4-4-0	1909	American Locomotive Company	45921	Undergoing 1,472-day inspection and overhaul
114		Diesel	SW-1	1940	Electro-Motive Diesel (Formerly EMC/Electro-Motive Division)	1021	Operational
4662		Railcar	Doodlebug	1929	Pullman Company	6202-22697	Operational
8408		Diesel	SW-1	1940	Electro-Motive Division	1106	Operational

=== Former units ===
Locomotive details
Number	Image	Type	Model	Built	Builder	Owner
1		Steam	0-4-0	1950	H.K. Porter	Marshallton
37 (Note: No. 37 was paired with a former C&O auxiliary tender during its time at the WWRC.)		Steam	2-8-2T	1925	American Locomotive Company	Age of Steam Roundhouse
60		Steam	0-6-0B6sa	1913	Pennsylvania Railroad	Lewes Junction Railroad & Bridge Association
14		Steam	2-8-0	1918	American Locomotive Company	Gaithersburg, Maryland
425		Steam	4-6-2	1928	Baldwin Locomotive Works	Reading Blue Mountain and Northern Railroad
915		Diesel	SW900	1956	Electro-Motive Diesel	Black River Western Railroad
S-3		Steam	0-6-0T	1943	Vulcan Iron Works	Honey's Farm Fresh Gourmet Kitchen
D-3		Diesel	S2	1949	American Locomotive Company	West Chester Railroad

=== Rolling stock ===
Rolling stock details
Number	Image	Type	Built	Builder	Status
410		Combine	1914	Pullman Company	Operational
571		Coach	1914	Pullman Company	Operational
581		Coach	1914	Pullman Company	Operational
603		Coach	1915	Pullman Company	Operational
6795		Parlor car	1930	Pullman Company	Operational
442		Open-air car	1912	Altoona Works	Stored, operational
450		Coach	1912	Altoona Works	Stored, inoperable
C149		Caboose	1941	Erie Railroad	Operational
C2013		Caboose	1926	Baltimore and Ohio Railroad	Operational
C2042		Caboose	1926	Baltimore and Ohio Railroad	Operational

== Gallery ==
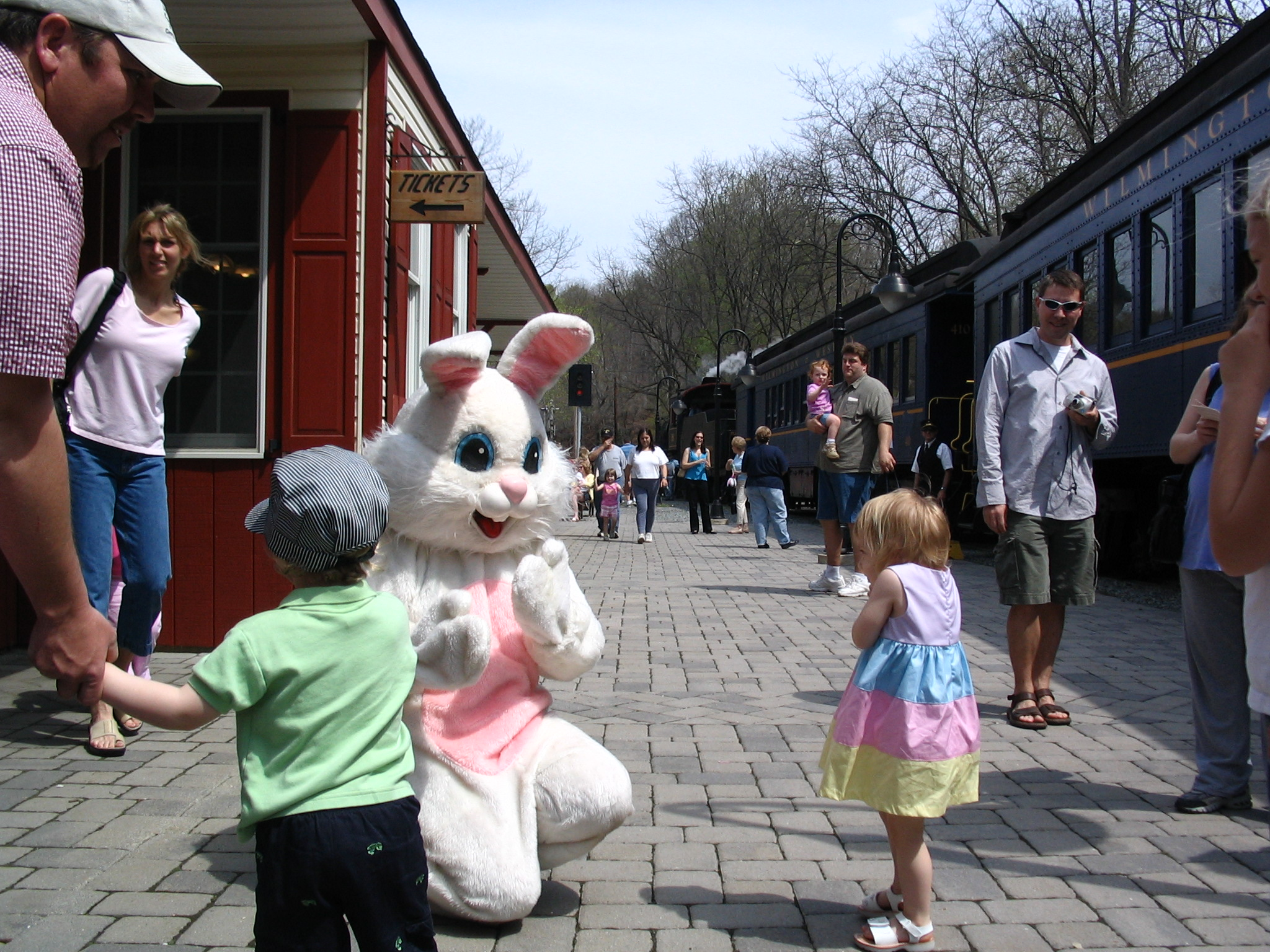
An Easter Bunny during the Wilmington and Western's Annual Easter Bunny Express.

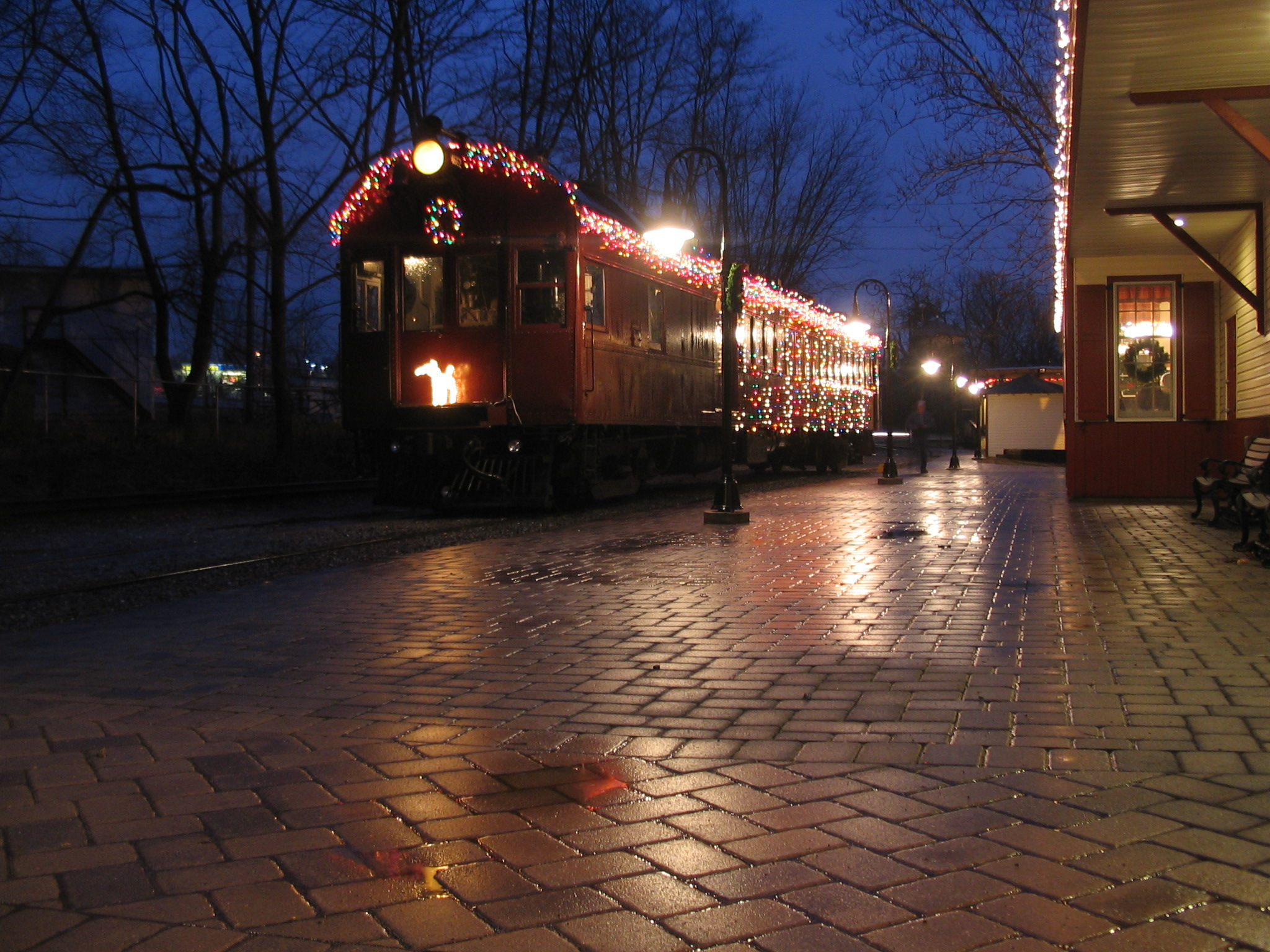
W&W No. 4662 operating during the holidays.

== See also ==
- List of heritage railways
- List of Delaware railroads
