= Baldwin Locomotive Works 26 =

Preserved American 0-6-0 steam locomotive

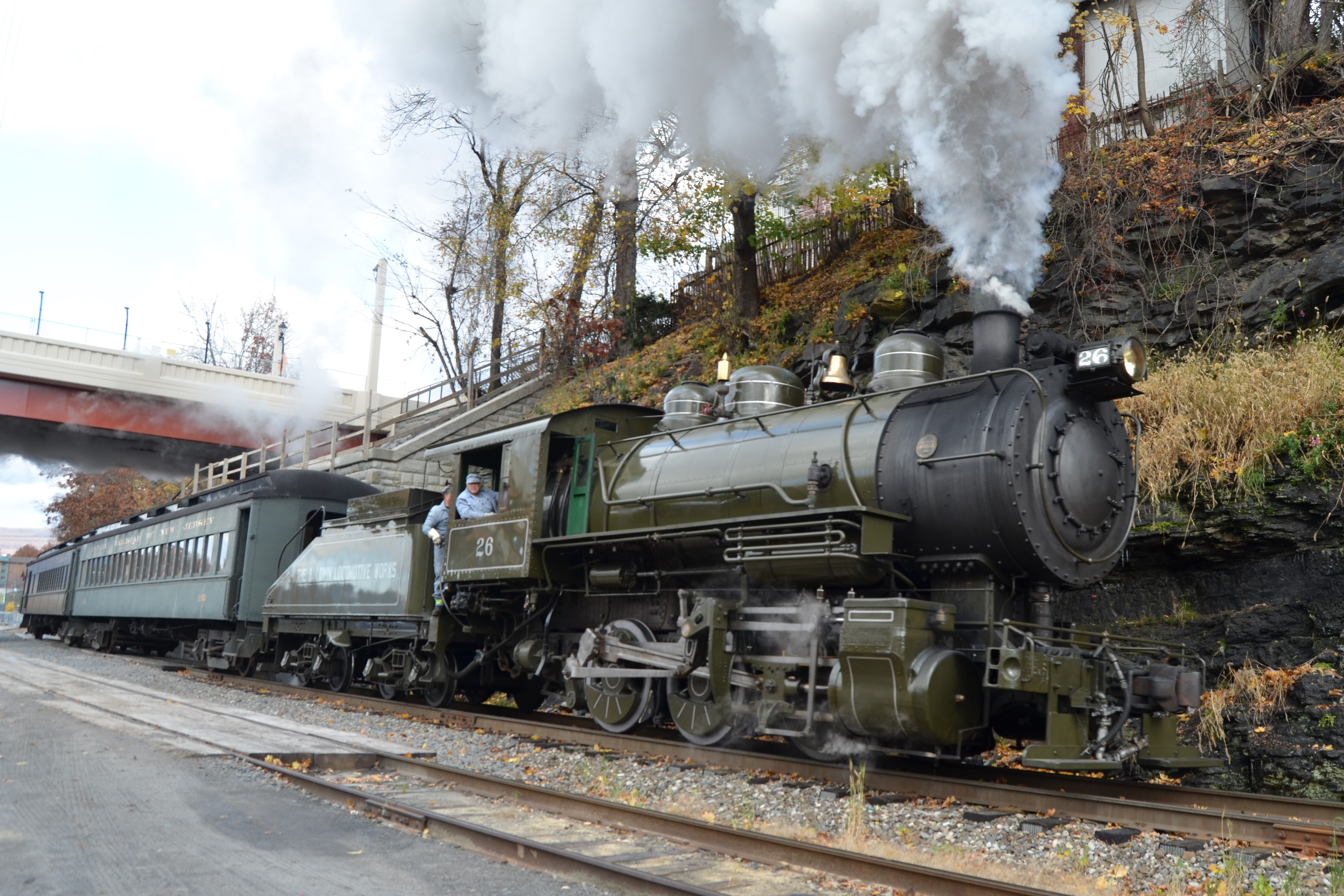
- Baldwin No. 26 hauling an excursion on November 18, 2018
Type and origin
- Power type: Steam
- Builder: Baldwin Locomotive Works
- Serial number: 60733
- Build date: March 1929
Specifications
- Configuration
  - Whyte: 0-6-0
  - UIC: C
- Gauge: 4 ft 8 1/2 in (1,435 mm)
- Driver dia.: 50 in (1,270 mm)
- Adhesive weight: 124,000 lb (56.2 tonnes)
- Loco weight: 124,000 lb (56.2 tonnes)
- Fuel type: Coal
- Fuel capacity: 7 short tons (6.4 tonnes)
- Water cap.: 1,750 US gal (6,600 L; 1,460 imp gal)
- Boiler pressure: 180 psi (1.24 MPa)
- Cylinders: Two, outside
- Cylinder size: 20 in × 24 in (508 mm × 610 mm)
- Valve gear: Walschaerts
- Valve type: Slide valves
- Loco brake: Air
- Train brakes: Air
- Couplers: Knuckle
Performance figures
- Tractive effort: 29,375 lbf (130.7 kN)
Career
- Operators: Baldwin Locomotive Works; Jackson Iron & Steel Company; Steamtown National Historic Site
- Numbers: BLW 26; JI&S 3; NKP 17
- Nicknames: Chugga; Rover
- Retired: N/A
- Preserved: 1979
- Restored: June 1990
- Current owner: Steamtown National Historic Site
- Disposition: Operational

Baldwin Locomotive Works 26 is an 0-6-0 "Switcher" type steam locomotive, built in March 1929 by the Baldwin Locomotive Works (BLW). It is preserved and operated by the Steamtown National Historic Site in Scranton, Pennsylvania for use on excursion trains.

== History ==
=== Revenue service ===
No. 26 was built in March 1929 by the Baldwin Locomotive Works (BLW). It is one of several "stock" switchers equipped with a slope-backed tender. During the first nineteen years of its existence, the engine worked at the Baldwin Locomotive Works plant in Eddystone, Pennsylvania. Painted in Baldwin's standard olive green with aluminum trim and lettering livery, the engine labored hauling raw materials and completed locomotives around the plant with at least two other identical sister locomotives (numbers 21 and 24). Other locomotives of this design were built for the Atlantic Coast Line Railroad (ACL), Lehigh and New England Railroad (LNE), and General Steel Castings (GSI).

Following the end of World War II, the locomotive was purchased by the Jackson Iron and Steel Company (JI&S) of Jackson, Ohio, becoming their No. 3 in 1948. While working at JI&S, the locomotive's career is relatively unknown, but the locomotive's career is known to have lasted unusually late for a steam locomotive in revenue service, before being retired from revenue service, it is unknown when No. 26 last operated at JI&S. In 1979, the locomotive was purchased by Jerry Jacobson who saved the locomotive from scrap.

=== Preservation ===
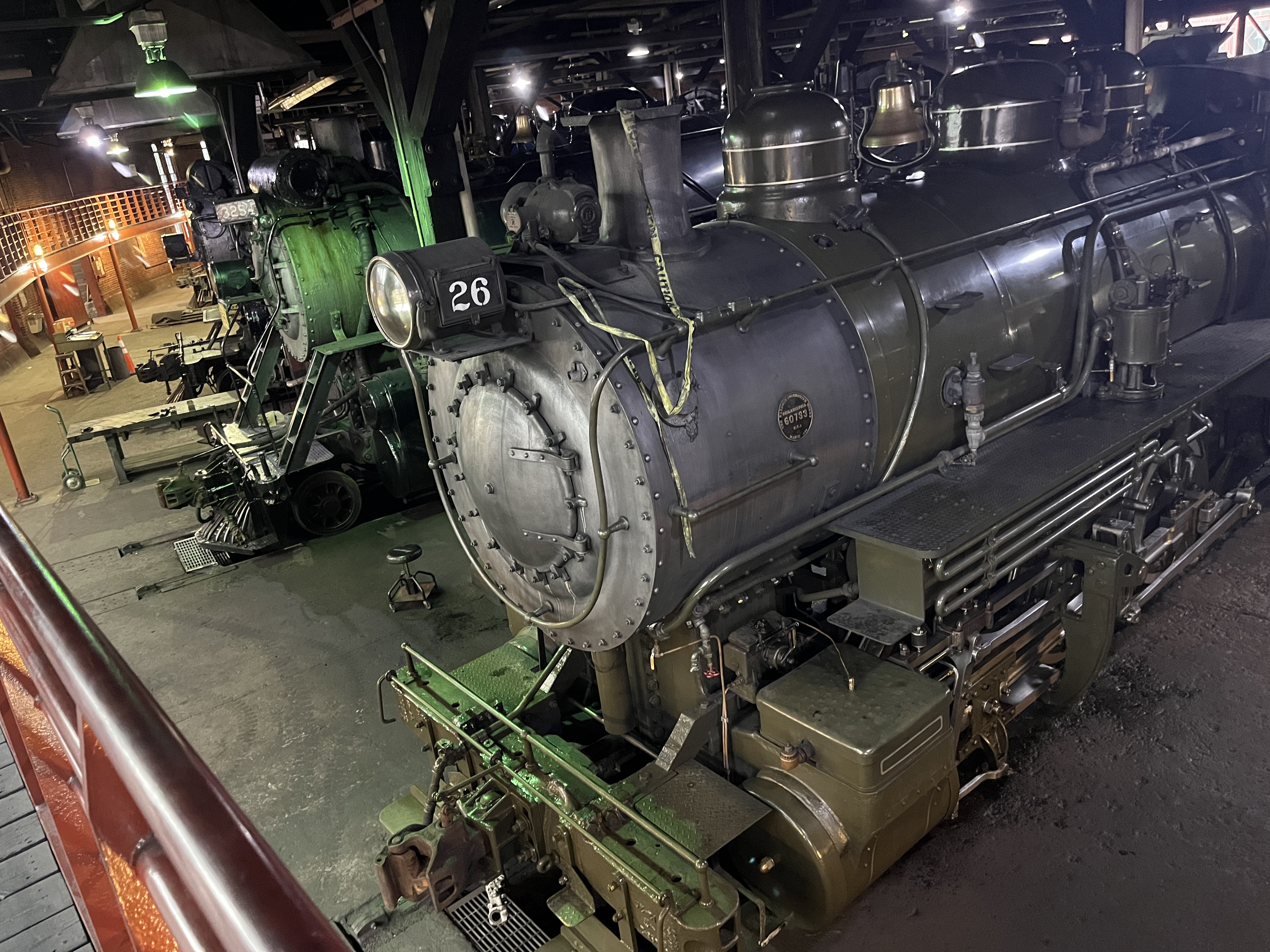
BLW 26 and other locomotives stored inside the Steamtown roundhouse

In 1983, Jacobson had the locomotive moved from Jackson, first to Grand Rapids, Ohio, then to the Mad River & NKP Railroad Museum in Bellevue, Ohio where it was painted as Nickel Plate Road No. 17. Three years later in 1986, Jacobson traded the switcher with the Steamtown Foundation of Scranton, Pennsylvania for their ex Canadian National 4-6-0 No. 1551. Later that same year, Steamtown was taken over by the National Park Service becoming Steamtown National Historic Site (NHS). The locomotive remained in Bellevue, Ohio while the Steamtown Foundation transferred its collection to the National Park Service, it eventually arrived on Steamtown property in January 1990. Upon arrival, No. 26 would enter Steamtown shops for a complete restoration, it was painted black with white lettering albeit in the same style as her original Baldwin Locomotive Works livery. Upon returning to operation, it began its first excursion runs in the summer of 1990.

=== Excursion service ===
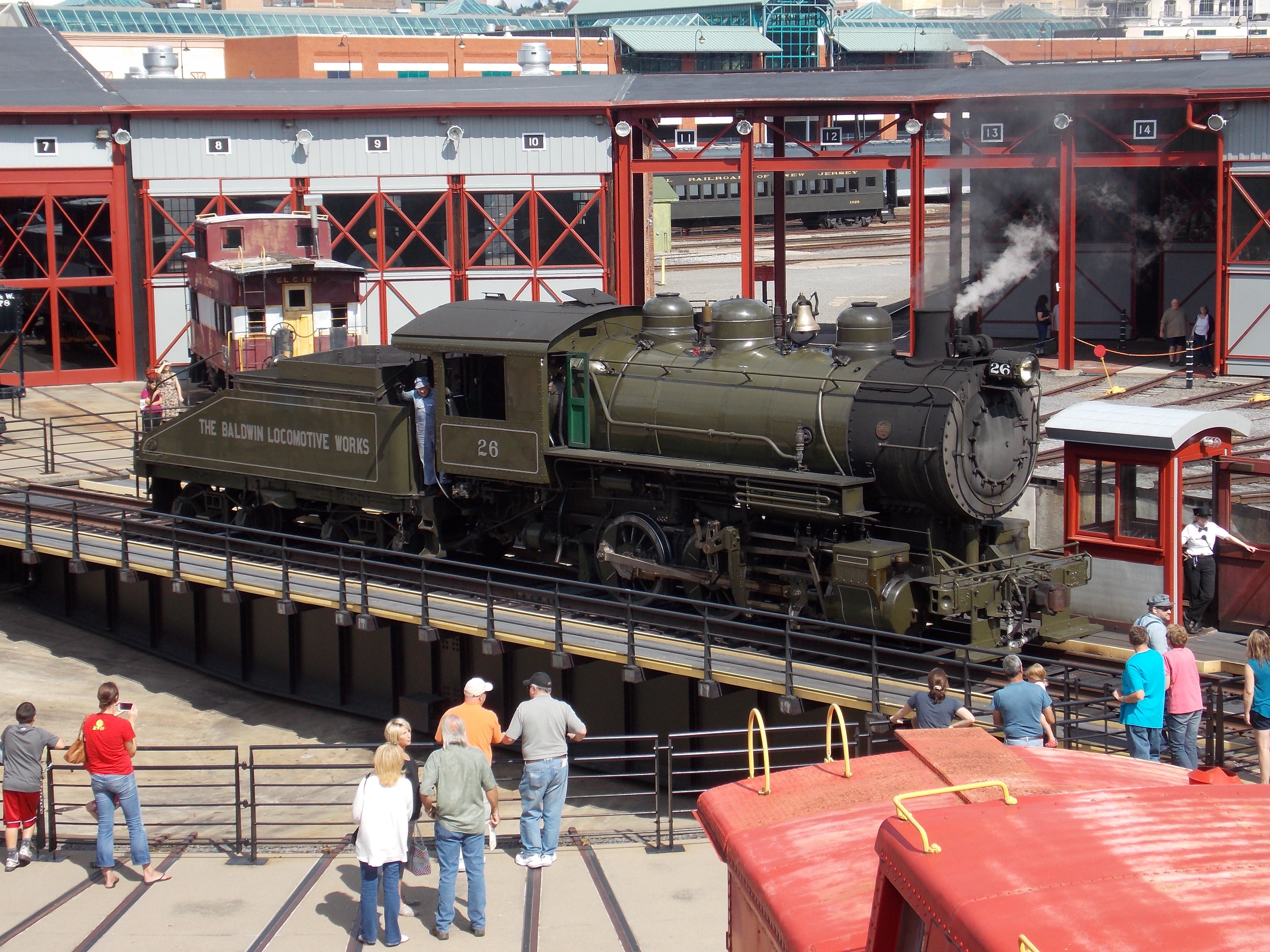
BLW #26 on the Turntable at Steamtown. (August 2017)

Prior to the official opening of Steamtown National Historic Site, the engine frequently ferried passengers between the temporary visitors center and the former Delaware, Lackawanna and Western Railroad roundhouse and turntable complex then undergoing renovations to become the permanent visitors center, museum, and locomotive storage and servicing facility for the park. Following the completion of the museum complex in June 1995, No. 26 participated in the grand opening of Steamtown's main roundhouse alongside multiple other locomotives, including Canadian Pacific 2317, Reading Blue Mountain and Northern Railroad 425, New York, Susquehanna and Western 142, and Milwaukee Road 261, it also ceremonially "cut" a ribbon laid across one of the yard tracks during the official opening ceremony.

Following the official opening of the park, the locomotive became the primary power on Steamtown's short Scranton Limited trains between the museum complex and just beyond the former DL&W Scranton station. It also ran the "Nay Aug Gorge Limited", which travels past the former DL&W Scranton station, and stops on the outskirts of the city just before the Nay Aug tunnel at Nay Aug Park. It also occasionally ran trips to Carbondale, Pennsylvania. In December 1999, No. 26 made its final runs for Steamtown and was taken out of service indefinitely for its FRA-mandated 5-year inspection, while in the shops, it was discovered that the entire inner firebox, and portions of the boiler were in imminent need of replacement. Park management decided to rebuild the engine and the locomotive was completely disassembled. During the disassembly process, it was discovered that the locomotive's frame was bent.

The ensuing overhaul, which lasted seventeen years, saw the rebuilding of the locomotive's running gear, replacement of the firebox, straightening of the frame, re-boring of the cylinders, and other various preventative maintenance. The engine's overhaul was completed in late 2015 and made a successful test run on December 10, 2015, It made its official excursion service return on April 17, 2016. Following its return to service, No. 26 resumed its position as power on the Scranton Limited and “Nay Aug Gorge Limited” yard shuttles, replacing CP 2317.

On September 11, 2018, No. 26 was given the nickname, Chugga, during the Railfest 2018 "Name the Train" contest. On November 12, 2019, No. 26 was given its new nickname, Rover, during Steamtown's Railfest 2019 "Name the Train" contest.
