= Central Railroad of New Jersey 113 =

Preserved American 0-6-0 steam locomotive

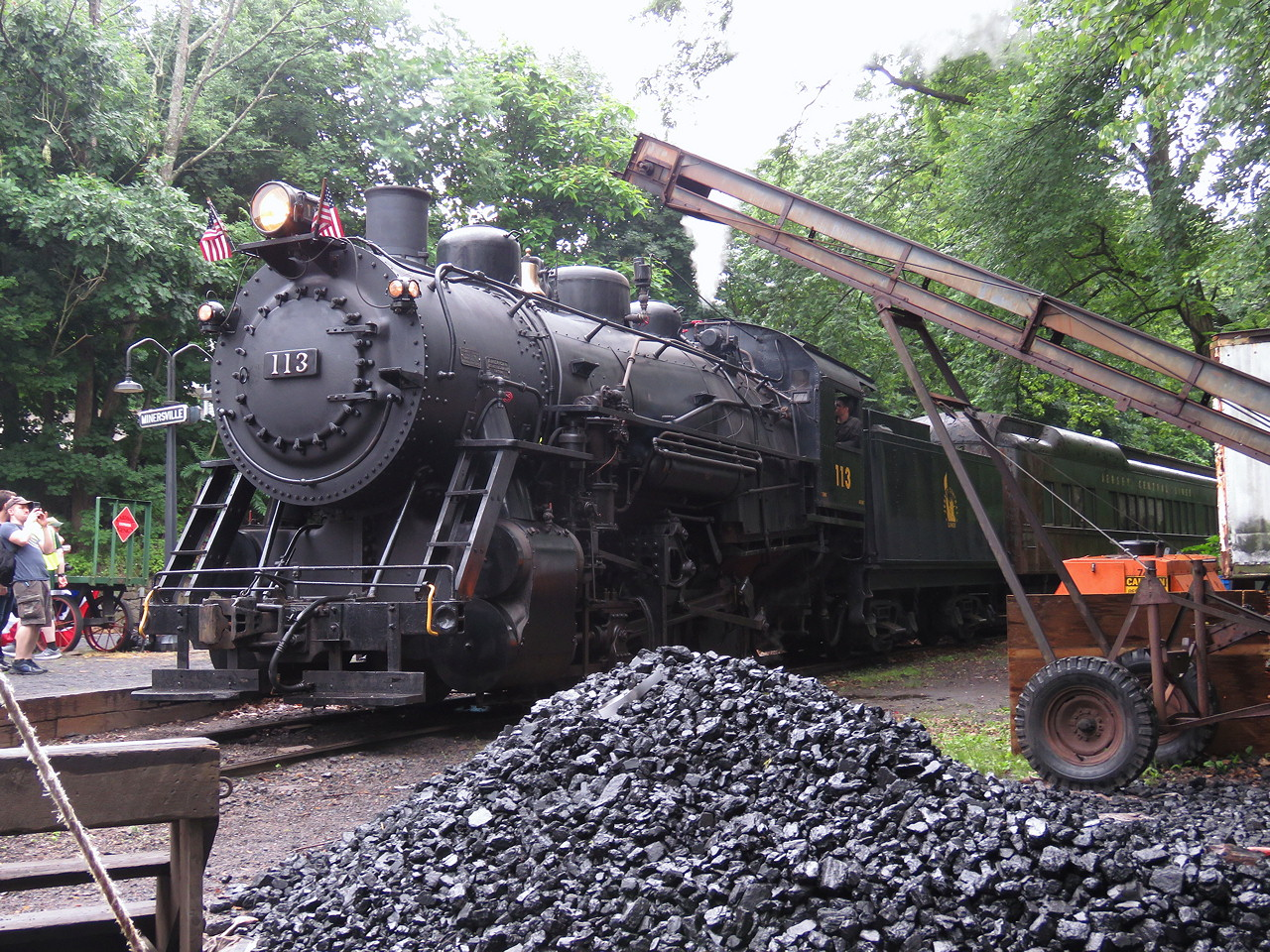
- No. 113 at Minersville, Pennsylvania in June 2021
Type and origin
- Power type: Steam
- Builder: American Locomotive Company
- Serial number: 64384
- Build date: June 1923
Specifications
- Configuration
  - Whyte: 0-6-0
- Gauge: 4 ft 8 1/2 in (1,435 mm) standard gauge
- Driver dia.: 51 in (1.295 m)
- Loco weight: 197,000 lb (89,000 kg; 89 t)
- Tender weight: 139,300 lb (63,200 kg; 63.2 t)
- Total weight: 336,300 lb (152,500 kg; 152.5 t)
- Fuel type: Anthracite coal
- Boiler: 76.5 in (1.94 m) diameter
- Boiler pressure: 200 psi (1.38 MPa)
- Cylinders: Two, outside
- Cylinder size: 23 in × 26 in (584 mm × 660 mm)
- Valve gear: Baker
- Loco brake: Air
- Train brakes: Air
- Couplers: Knuckle
Performance figures
- Tractive effort: 45,847 lbf (203.9 kN)
Career
- Operators: Central Railroad of New Jersey; Philadelphia & Reading Coal & Iron Company; The Railway Restoration Project 113 Organization; Reading Blue Mountain and Northern Railroad (leased)
- Class: B-7
- Number in class: 3rd of 5
- Numbers: CNJ 113; RDG 113
- Retired: January 1960
- Restored: November 23, 2012
- Current owner: The Railway Restoration Project 113 Organization
- Disposition: Undergoing 1,472-day inspection and overhaul

Central Railroad of New Jersey 113 is a B-7 class 0-6-0 "Switcher" type steam locomotive built in 1923 by the American Locomotive Company (ALCO) for the Central Railroad of New Jersey (CNJ). The locomotive was designed solely for yard service and could only operate at slow speeds due to the locomotive not having any leading or trailing wheels, but only six driving wheels (thus the 0-6-0 wheel arrangement). No. 113 currently performs passenger excursion services and some freight assignments on Reading Blue Mountain & Northern (RBMN) operated tracks. It is owned and operated by the Railway Restoration Project 113 Organization out of Minersville, PA, but during 2025 the locomotive was taken out of service for its annual 1'472 day inspection, which the locomotive is still undergoing currently.

== History ==
=== Revenue service ===
No. 113 was built in June 1923 by the American Locomotive Company (ALCO) It was one of five B-7 type switchers built for the Central Railroad of New Jersey (CNJ), numbers 111–115. These locomotives were built for the Anthracite Roads of Pennsylvania, and thus had wide Wootten fireboxes to burn anthracite coal. As 0-6-0s they were only effective as switchers since they did not ride smoothly and rarely exceeded 15 mph (24 km/h). The class worked the CNJ's freight yards for almost three decades. In 1945, the railroad reclassed them to 6S46 (6-wheeled Switcher, 46,000 pounds tractive effort). By 1951, locomotives 111-115 were withdrawn from service and replaced by diesel locomotives.

Around 1953 the Philadelphia & Reading Coal & Iron Company (RDG), now the Reading Anthracite Company, bought No. 113 for use at a colliery in Locust Summit outside Ashland, Pennsylvania. No. 113 also ran some railtours with CNJ No. 774 in 1954, but 774 was soon scrapped. The company continued to use No. 113 until January 1960, when it was retired from revenue service.

=== Change in ownership ===
No. 113 was then stored outside Locust Summit for nearly 20 years, decaying heavily from exposure in this time. The company eventually donated No. 113 to the Historic Red Clay Valley Inc. (located in Wilmington, Delaware) in 1980. In June 1986, the locomotive was purchased by Robert E. Kimmel Sr. and was later moved to Minersville in February 1991.

=== Restoration ===
Restoration work on No. 113 began in 1999 and took more than ten years to reach operational condition. The total restoration cost was over than $600,000 with many hours of volunteer labor, compounded by No. 113's minimal protection from the elements, a lack of No. 113's original parts and no heavy machinery.

As a result, many replacement parts had to be made from scratch as there were no commercial builders producing steam locomotive parts. In one case the volunteers had to make a wooden cast of the original three-chime whistle by measuring an original CNJ whistle on hand. Some additional work included a replacement tender, which was fabricated by Oaks Welding in Buck Run, Pennsylvania. The engine was finally in steam after more than five decades after withdrawal on November 23, 2012. The Railway Restoration Project 113 Organization ran a test-run on the same day with more in 2013 and 2014.

=== Excursion service ===
After test runs concluded in late 2012 to mid-2013, the locomotive began running passenger excursions in late 2013 with RBMN No. 425. No. 113 continued running excursions both by itself and with No. 425 during the 2014 season. No. 113 has run excursions across the Reading Blue Mountain and Northern Railroad's (RBMN) lines in cooperation with them every year since, for this the RBMN provides passenger cars and occasionally some helper locomotives to Railway Restoration Project 113. Currently No. 113 operates out of Minersville, PA, at the Minersville Train Depot, hauling multiple excursions each year.

On September 1 and 7, 2014, No. 113 ran several excursions trains throughout Labor Day weekend in celebration of the 35th anniversary of the Railway Restoration Project 113 Organization.

On April 5, 2017, No. 113 masqueraded as No. 115 and operated for several Easter train excursions. On June 19, 2021, No. 113 ran a fundraiser 37-mile excursion train on the RBMN for engineer Chris Bost, who was suffering from a nerve disease illness an the time.

On December 11-12, 2022, No. 113 ran three excursion trips for the Santa Claus train.

In June 2023, the locomotive celebrated its 100th birthday. In October, the locomotive was steamed up for a night photo session.

In May 2024, No. 113 ran six excursion trains in celebration of Minersville’s first Community Day.

In March of 2025, No. 113 was taken out of service for the federally mandated 1,472 day inspection which it is still undergoing in Minersville, Pennsylvania.

== See also ==
- Central Railroad of New Jersey
