= South Australian Railways X class =

Class of Australian 2-6-0 locomotives

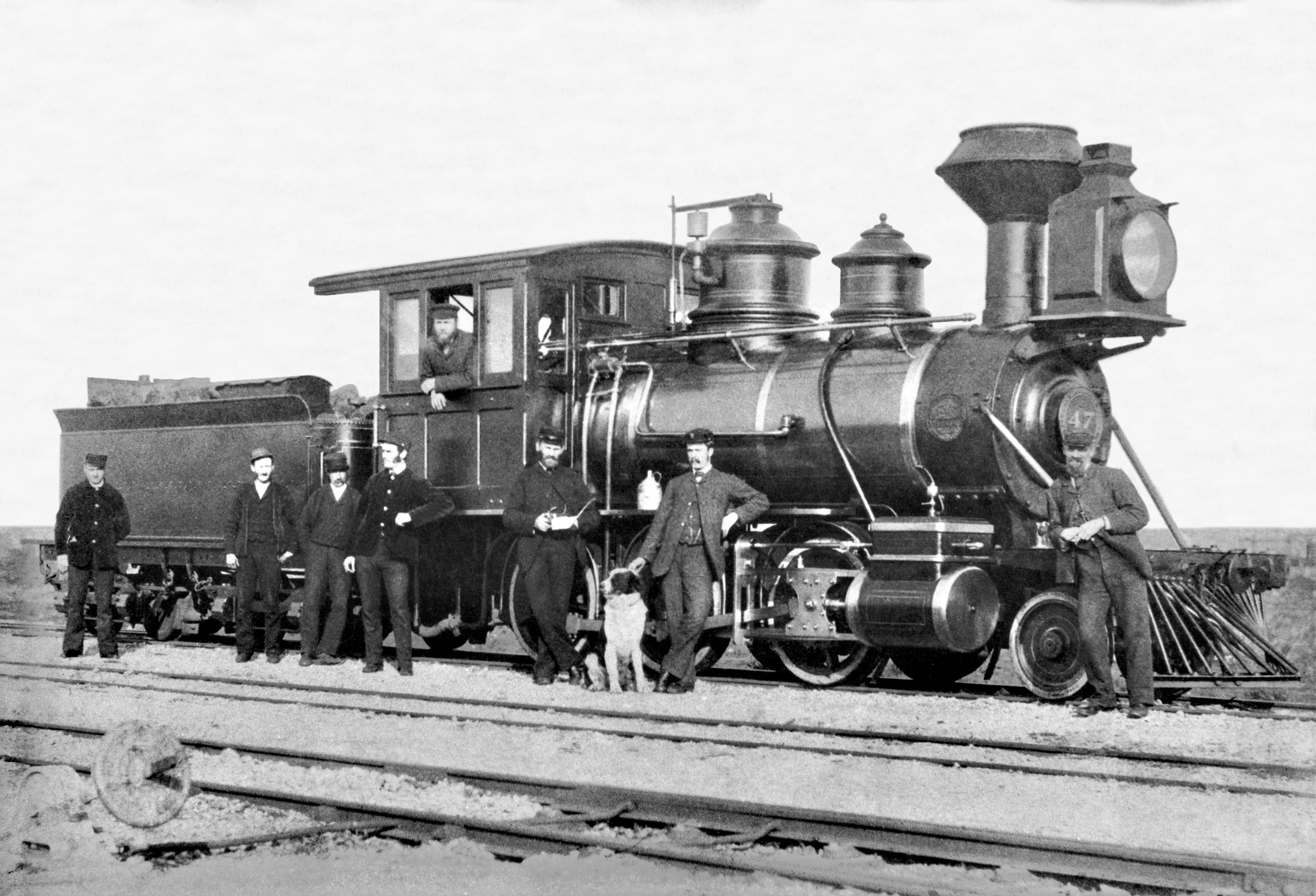
- South Australian Railways X class locomotive no. 47
Type and origin
- Power type: Steam
- Builder: Baldwin Locomotive Works, Philadelphia
- Build date: 1881
- Total produced: 8
Specifications
- Configuration
  - Whyte: 2-6-0
- Gauge: 1,067 mm (3 ft 6 in)
- Driver dia.: 3 ft 2 in (965 mm)
- Height: 10 ft 9 1/2 in (3,289.3 mm)
- Total weight: 39 long tons 0 cwt (87,400 lb or 39.6 t)
- Fuel type: Coal
- Boiler pressure: 130 psi (896 kPa)
- Cylinders: 2
- Cylinder size: 14.5 in × 18 in (368 mm × 457 mm)
Career
- Operators: South Australian Railways
- Class: X
- Numbers: 44-51
- Disposition: all scrapped

The South Australian Railways X class was a class of 2-6-0 steam locomotives operated by the South Australian Railways on its narrow-gauge lines.

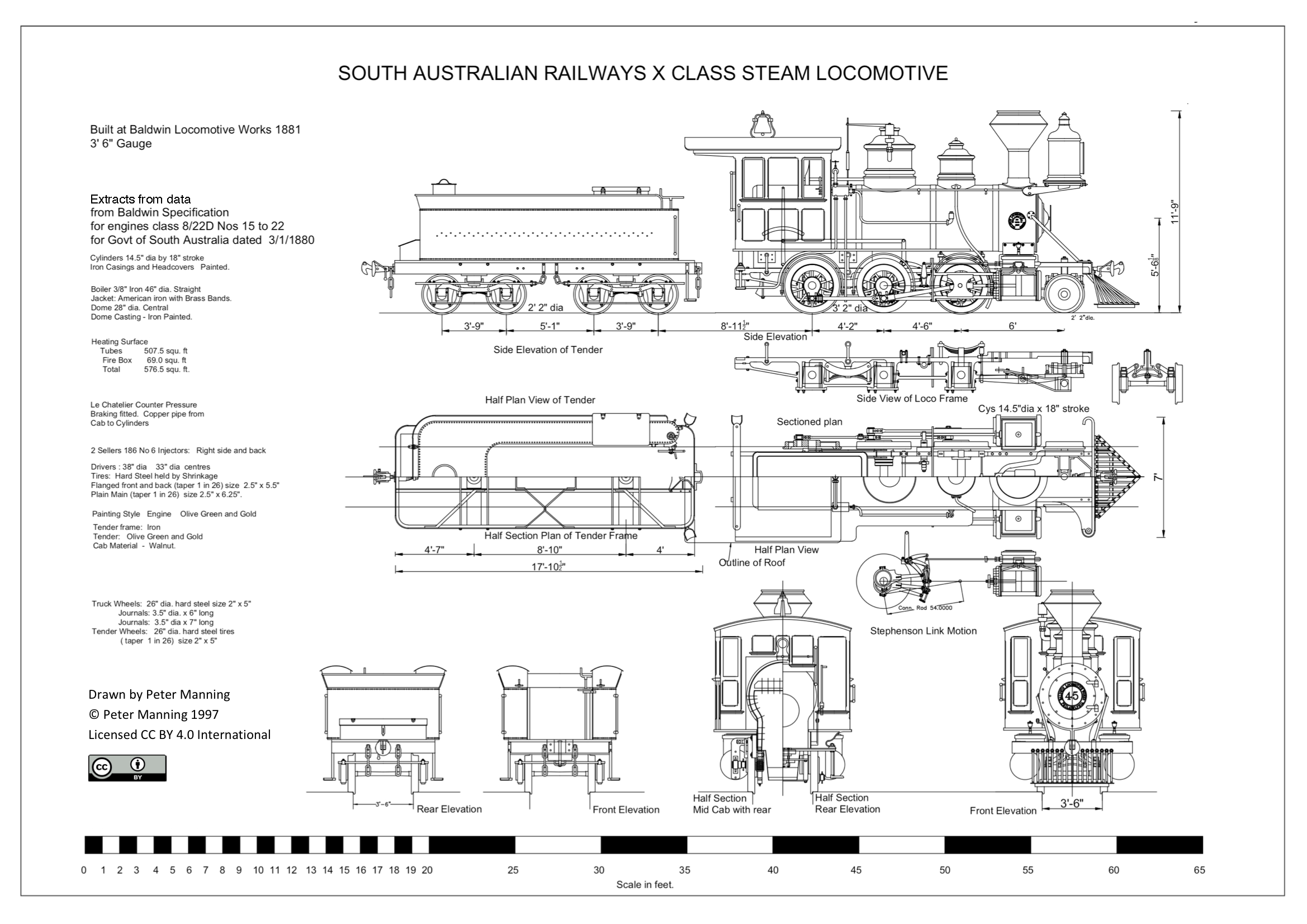
General arrangement drawings of the X class

== History ==
In 1881–82, Baldwin Locomotive Works delivered eight 2-6-0 locomotives to the South Australian Railways (SAR) for use on its 1067 mm (3 ft 6 in) network. Initially two were allocated to the Port Wakefield line, two to Port Pirie and four to Port Augusta. All were transferred to Peterborough to operate construction trains on the Broken Hill line and then providing motive power on the line, including operating into New South Wales via the Silverton Tramway.

In December 1896, number 49 was sold to Western Australian timber mill Millar Bros hauling trains around Denmark and Palgarup before being scrapped in 1944. The other seven remained with the SAR until withdrawn in the 1900s with the last lasting until April 1907.
