= Canadian National 96 =

Preserved CN class E-10-a steam locomotive

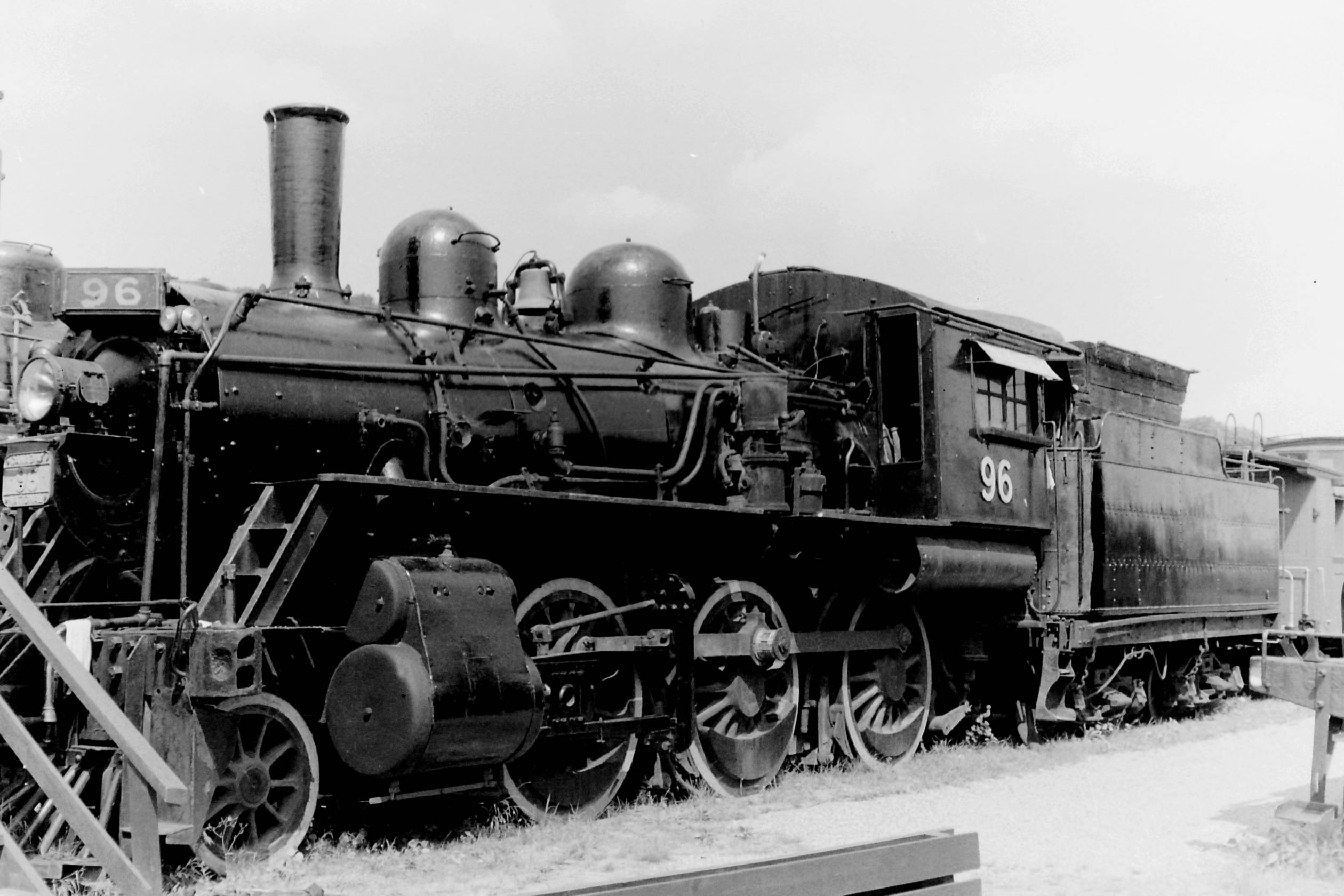
- No. 96 on display at Steamtown U.S.A in Bellow Falls, Vermont, August 1970
Type and origin
- Power type: Steam
- Builder: Canadian Locomotive Company
- Serial number: 937
- Build date: 1910
Specifications
- Configuration
  - Whyte: 2-6-0
- Gauge: 4 ft 8 1/2 in (1,435 mm)
- Driver dia.: 63 in (1.600 m)
- Wheelbase: 49.71 ft (15.15 m)
- Adhesive weight: 120,600 lb (54.7 t)
- Loco weight: 141,800 lb (64.3 t)
- Fuel type: Coal
- Fuel capacity: 10 long tons (10 t)
- Water cap.: 6,000 imperial gallons (27,000 L; 7,200 US gal)
- Boiler pressure: 170 lbf/in^{2} (1.17 MPa)
- Heating surface
  - Firebox: 166 sq ft (15.4 m^{2})
- Cylinders: Two, outside
- Cylinder size: 21 in × 26 in (533 mm × 660 mm)
- Valve gear: Stephenson
- Valve type: Piston valves
- Loco brake: Air
- Train brakes: Air
- Couplers: Knuckle
Performance figures
- Tractive effort: 26,300 lbf (116.99 kN)
Career
- Operators: Grand Trunk Railway; Canadian National Railway
- Class: GT: E-12; CN: E-10-a
- Numbers: GT 1024; CN 926; CN 96
- Retired: 1958
- Current owner: Age of Steam Roundhouse
- Disposition: On static display

Canadian National 96 is a E-10-a class 2-6-0 "Mogul" type steam locomotive, built in 1910 by the Canadian Locomotive Company (CLC) for the Grand Trunk Railway (GT). It is preserved at the Age of Steam Roundhouse in Sugarcreek, Ohio.

== History ==
The locomotive was built in 1910 by the Canadian Locomotive Company in Kingston, Ontario, for the Grand Trunk Railway as No. 1024. In 1923, when the GT merged with the Canadian National Railways (CN), No. 1024 was renumbered as No. 926 and later as No. 96. The locomotive hauled light freight trains across Canada and on small branch lines in Ontario until it was retired in 1958.

In June 1959, No. 96 was purchased by F. Nelson Blount, who moved it for display the Edaville Railroad in February 1963. In October 1969, it was added to his steam locomotive collection at Steamtown, U.S.A. in Bellows Falls, Vermont. It was used as a spare parts source for sister locomotive No. 89. In 1986, while the Steamtown equipment was being transferred to Scranton, Pennsylvania, No. 96 was sold to Horst Muller of Brantford, Ontario, who placed it in storage for eight years.

On November 16, 1994, No. 96 was purchased by Jerry Jacobson and moved with the rest of his steam-locomotive collection to the Ohio Central Railroad System (OCR) in Coshocton, Ohio. In 2011, Jacobson's collection was moved to the new Age of Steam Roundhouse in Sugarcreek, Ohio, where it remains on static display.
