= South African Class NG7 2-6-0 =

1902 narrow-gauge steam locomotive

CGR Baldwin 2-6-0 South African Class NG7 2-6-0
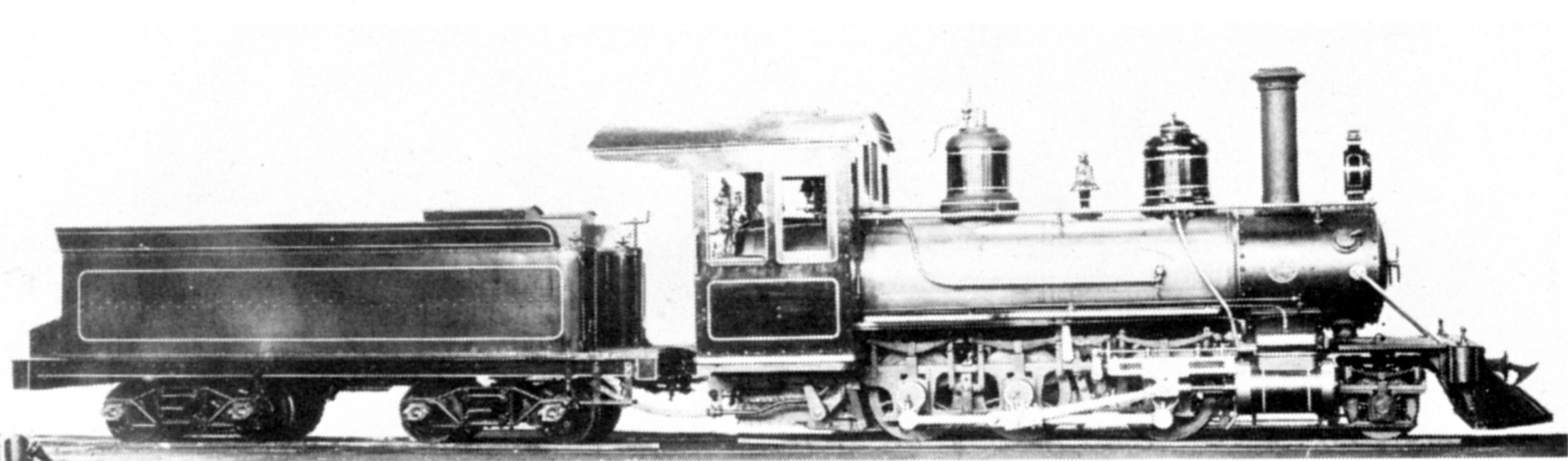
- Baldwin works photograph, c. 1902
Type and origin
- Power type: Steam
- Designer: Baldwin Locomotive Works
- Builder: Baldwin Locomotive Works
- Serial number: 19456, 19649, 19650, 36375
- Build date: 1901–1911
- Total produced: 4
Specifications
- Configuration
  - Whyte: 2-6-0
  - UIC: 1'Cn2
- Driver: 2nd coupled axle
- Gauge: 2 ft (610 mm) narrow
- Leading dia.: 22 in (559 mm)
- Coupled dia.: 33 in (838 mm)
- Tender wheels: 22 in (559 mm)
- Wheelbase: 36 ft 5 in (11,100 mm)
  - Axle spacing (Asymmetrical): 1-2: 4 ft (1,219 mm); 2-3: 3 ft (914 mm)
  - Engine: 12 ft 10 in (3,912 mm)
  - Coupled: 7 ft (2,134 mm)
  - Tender: 13 ft 7 in (4,140 mm)
  - Tender bogie: 4 ft 1 in (1,245 mm)
- Length
  - Over couplers: 43 ft 9 3/4 in (13,354 mm)
- Height: 10 ft 4 3/4 in (3,169 mm)
- Frame type: Bar
- Axle load
  - Leading: 2 LT 4 cwt 2 qtr (2,261 kg)
  - Coupled: 5 LT 15 cwt 2 qtr (5,868 kg)
  - Tender bogie: Bogie 1: 10 LT 10 cwt 2 qtr (10,690 kg); Bogie 2: 10 LT 6 cwt (10,470 kg)
- Adhesive weight: 17 LT 6 cwt 2 qtr (17,600 kg)
- Loco weight: 19 LT 11 cwt (19,860 kg)
- Tender weight: 20 LT 16 cwt 2 qtr (21,160 kg)
- Total weight: 40 LT 7 cwt 2 qtr (41,020 kg)
- Tender type: 2-axle bogies
- Fuel type: Coal
- Fuel capacity: 5 LT (5.1 t)
- Water cap.: 1,500 imp gal (6,820 L)
- Firebox
  - Type: Round-top
  - Grate area: 0.71 m^{2} (7.6 sq ft)
- Boiler
  - Pitch: 4 ft 8 3/8 in (1,432 mm)
  - Diameter: 3 ft 2 1/8 in (968 mm)
- Boiler pressure: 180 psi (1,241 kPa)
- Safety valve: Ramsbottom
- Heating surface
  - Firebox: 3.75 m^{2} (40.4 sq ft)
  - Tubes: 35.39 m^{2} (380.9 sq ft)
  - Total surface: 39.14 m^{2} (421.3 sq ft)
- Cylinders: Two
- Cylinder size: 11 3/4 in (298 mm) bore 16 in (406 mm) stroke
- Valve gear: Stephenson
- Couplers: Bell-and-hook
Performance figures
- Tractive effort: 9,036 lbf (40.19 kN) @ 75%
Career
- Operators: Cape Government Railways; South African Railways
- Class: Class NG7
- Number in class: 4
- Numbers: CGR 1-3, NG4; SAR NG22-NG24, NG35
- Delivered: 1902–1911
- First run: 1902
- Withdrawn: 1926
- The 2nd coupled axle had flangeless wheels

The South African Railways Class NG7 2-6-0 of 1902 was a narrow gauge steam locomotive from the pre-Union era in the Cape of Good Hope.

In 1902, the Cape Government Railways placed three steam locomotives with a 2-6-0 Mogul type wheel arrangement in service on the Hopefield narrow gauge branch line which was being constructed from Kalbaskraal. A fourth locomotive was ordered in 1911.

In 1912, when these locomotives were assimilated into the South African Railways, they were renumbered with an "NG" prefix to their numbers. When a system of grouping narrow gauge locomotives into classes was eventually introduced somewhere between 1928 and 1930, they were to be classified as Class NG7, but had already been withdrawn from service and were eventually sold in 1930.

== Cape narrow gauge lines ==
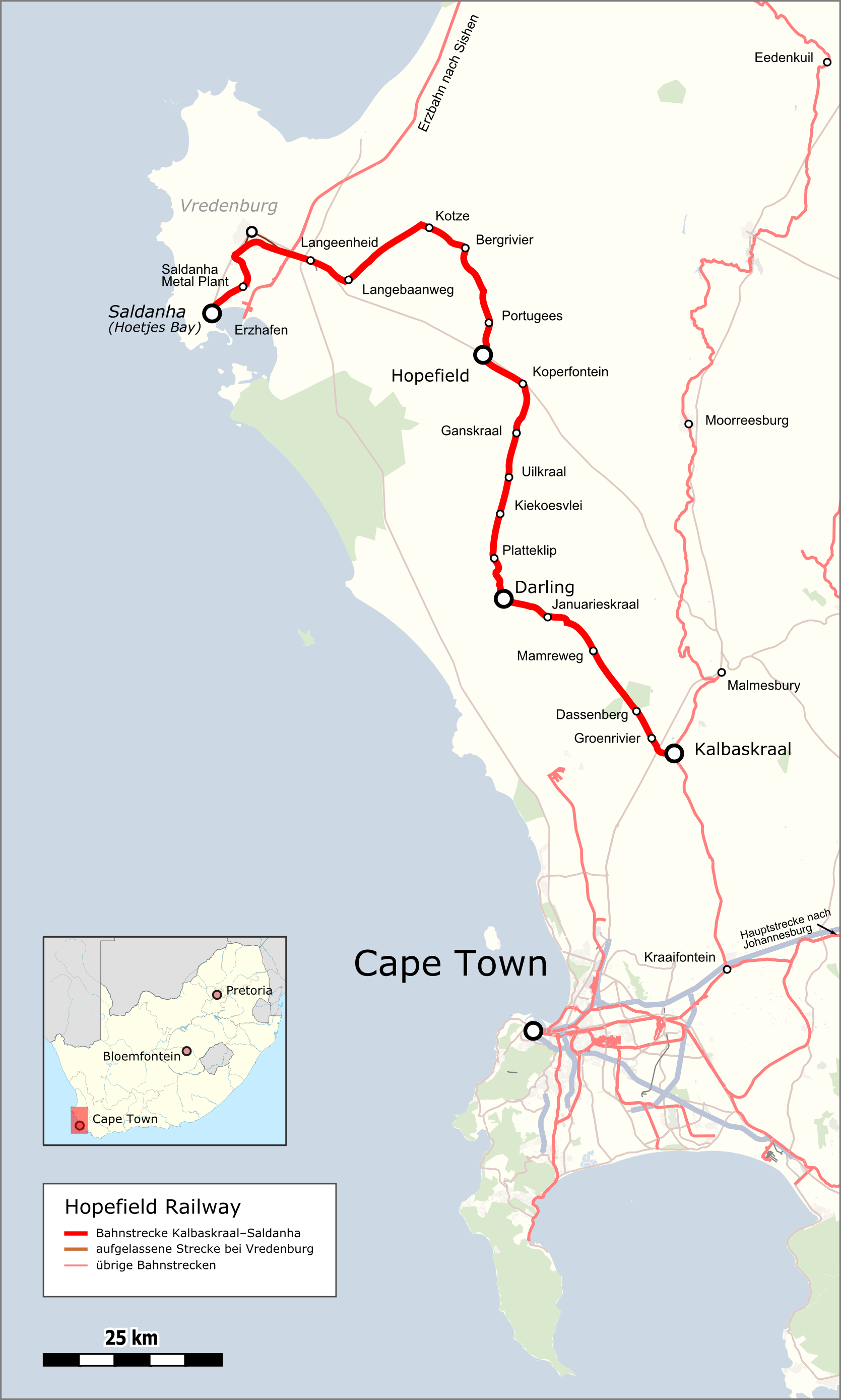

By 1900, the Cape of Good Hope Government began to consider the construction of 2 feet (610 millimetres) narrow gauge railways. The construction of two railways of this gauge, one from Kalbaskraal to Hopefield and another from Port Elizabeth to Avontuur, was sanctioned by the Cape Parliament in 1901. Even though the 2 feet 6 inches (762 millimetres) narrow gauge Namaqualand Railway had been in existence and successfully worked since 1869, the still narrower gauge 46-mile-long (74-kilometre) Hopefield line was regarded by many as the pioneer railway of the narrow gauge at the Cape. Its working capacity and attendant advantages and disadvantages were therefore watched with interest throughout the Colony.

== Manufacturer ==
The Cape Government Railways (CGR) ordered three narrow gauge tender locomotives with a 2-6-0 Mogul type wheel arrangement from Baldwin Locomotive Works in 1901. They were numbered 1 to 3 when they were delivered in 1902 and were erected at the Salt River shops. A fourth locomotive, identical to the first three, was ordered from the same manufacturer in 1911 and became CGR no. NG4 upon delivery in that same year.

== Characteristics ==
The locomotives were of a standard type which was being used on the narrow gauge railroads of Maine in the United States of America. They had bar frames and used Stephenson valve gear. The drivers, the middle wheelset of the coupled wheels, were flangeless to enable the engine to negotiate sharp curves.

== Service ==
=== Cape Government Railways ===
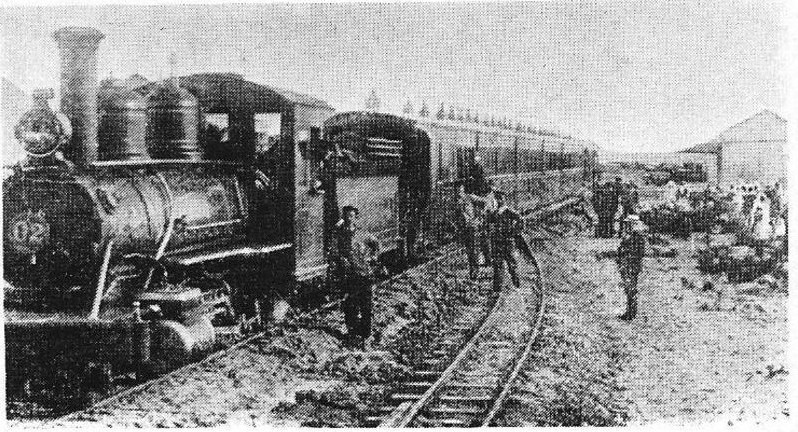
Baldwin 2-6-0 no. 2 at Hopefield, c. February 1903

The first three locomotives were acquired for use during the construction of the narrow gauge branch line from Kalbaskraal to Hopefield. They remained in service on that line after it was completed in 1903 and were joined by the fourth locomotive in 1911. In 1913, the line was extended to Saldanha, with a branch to Vredenburg. All four locomotives were withdrawn from service when these lines were widened to Cape gauge in 1926.

=== South African Railways ===
When the Union of South Africa was established on 31 May 1910, the three Colonial government railways (CGR, Natal Government Railways and Central South African Railways) were united under a single administration to control and administer the railways, ports and harbours of the Union. Although the South African Railways and Harbours came into existence in 1910, the actual classification and renumbering of all the rolling stock of the three constituent railways were only implemented with effect from 1 January 1912.

In 1912, narrow gauge locomotives were included in the South African Railways' narrow gauge numbering scheme and were allocated engine numbers prefixed with the letters NG, for narrow gauge. The three 1902 locomotives were allocated SAR numbers NG22 to NG24, while the 1911 locomotive became no. NG35.

=== First World War ===
In 1915, shortly after the outbreak of the First World War, the German South West Africa colony was occupied by the Union Defence Forces. Since a large part of the territory's railway infrastructure and rolling stock was destroyed or damaged by retreating German forces, an urgent need arose for locomotives for use on the 600 mm (1 ft 11 5/8 in) narrow gauge lines in that territory. In 1917, numbers NG22, NG24 and NG35 were transferred to the Defence Department for service in South West Africa. All three are believed to have returned to South Africa after the war.

== Narrow gauge classification ==
A system of grouping narrow gauge locomotives into classes was only adopted by the South African Railways at some time between 1928 and 1930. However, these locomotives did not survive in service long enough to become the Class NG7 which had apparently been reserved for them when the classification system was being planned. Having been out of service since 1926, they were sold to a private firm during 1930.
