= 2-6-0 =

Locomotive wheel arrangement

2-6-0 (Mogul)
- Front of locomotive at left

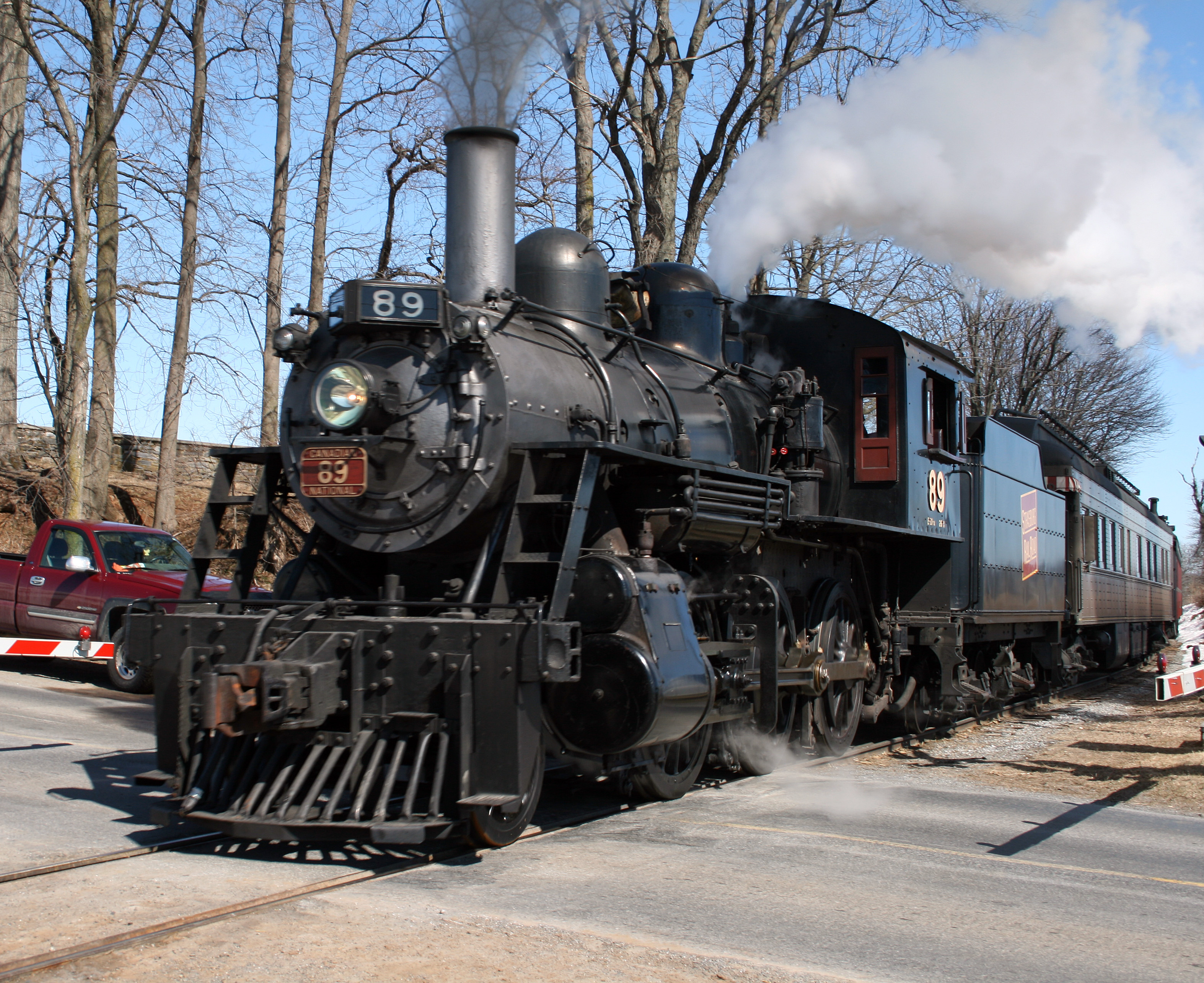
- Canadian National E-10-a class No. 89, now owned by the Strasburg Rail Road
Equivalent classifications
- UIC class: 1'C
- French class: 130
- Turkish class: 34
- Swiss class: 3/4
- Russian class: 1-3-0
First known tank engine version
- First use: c. 1870
- Country: England
- Railway: Garstang and Knot-End Railway
First known tender engine version
- First use: 1852–53
- Country: United States of America
- Locomotive: Pawnee
- Railway: Philadelphia & Reading Rail Road
- Builder: Baldwin Locomotive Works; Norris Locomotive Works
- Evolved from: 2-4-0
- Evolved to: 2-6-2
- Benefits: Better adhesion than the 2-4-0
- Drawbacks: Small drivers caused by the firebox being placed in between the driving wheels
First known "True type" version
- First use: 1860
- Country: United States of America
- Railway: Louisville & Nashville Railroad
- Evolved from: 2-4-0
- Evolved to: 2-6-2
- Benefits: Better adhesion with 6 coupled drivers
- Drawbacks: Small drivers limited speed

Under the Whyte notation for the classification of steam locomotives, 2-6-0 represents the wheel arrangement of two leading wheels on one axle, usually in a leading truck, six powered and coupled driving wheels on three axles and no trailing wheels. This arrangement is commonly called a Mogul.

== Overview ==
In the United States and Europe, the 2-6-0 wheel arrangement was principally used on tender locomotives. This type of locomotive was widely built in the United States from the early 1860s to the 1920s.

Although examples were built as early as 1852–53 by two Philadelphia manufacturers, Baldwin Locomotive Works and Norris Locomotive Works, these first examples had their leading axles mounted directly and rigidly on the frame of the locomotive rather than on a separate truck or bogie. On these early 2-6-0 locomotives, the leading axle was merely used to distribute the weight of the locomotive over a larger number of wheels. It was therefore essentially an 0-8-0 with an unpowered leading axle and the leading wheels did not serve the same purpose as, for example, the leading trucks of the 4-4-0 American or 4-6-0 Ten-Wheeler types which, at the time, had been in use for at least a decade.

The first American 2-6-0 with a rigidly mounted leading axle was the Pawnee, built for heavy freight service on the Philadelphia & Reading Rail Road. In total, about thirty locomotives of this type were built for various American railroads. While they were generally successful in slow, heavy freight service, the railroads that used these first 2-6-0 locomotives didn't see any great advantages in them over the 0-6-0 or 0-8-0 designs of the time. The railroads noted their increased pulling power, but also found that their rather rigid suspension made them more prone to derailments than the 4-4-0 locomotives of the day. Many railroad mechanics attributed these derailments to having too little weight on the leading truck.

The first true 2-6-0s were built in the early 1860s, the first few being built in 1860 for the Louisville and Nashville Railroad. The new design required the use of a single-axle swiveling truck. Such a truck was first patented in the United Kingdom by Levi Bissell in May 1857.

In 1864, William S. Hudson, then the superintendent of Rogers Locomotive and Machine Works, patented an equalized leading truck that was able to move independently of the driving axles. This equalized suspension worked much better over the uneven tracks of the day. The first locomotive built with such a leading truck was likely completed in 1865 for the New Jersey Rail Road and Transportation Company as their number 39.

The locomotive class name likely derives from a locomotive named Mogul, built by Taunton Locomotive Manufacturing Company in 1866 for the Central Railroad of New Jersey. However, it has also been suggested that it derived from the British 2-6-0 engine of that name, the prototype of its class, built by Neilson and Company for the Great Eastern Railway in 1879.

== Usage ==
=== Australia ===
Beyer, Peacock & Company provided large numbers of standard design 3 ft 6 in (1,067 mm) narrow gauge Mogul locomotives to several Australian Railways. Users of the Mogul type include the South Australian Railways with its Y class, the Tasmanian Government Railways with its C class, the Western Australian Government Railways with its G class (in a 4-6-0 configuration as well) and numerous private users. The SAR also purchased 8 examples of the type built by Baldwin which became the X class. The New South Wales Government Railways had a number of mogul types starting from the 1880s, forming the Z21, Z22, Z24, Z25 and Z27 classes.

=== Belgian Congo ===
Twenty 2-6-0 locomotives were built by Les Ateliers de Tubize locomotive works in Belgium for the 1,000 mm (3 ft 3 3/8 in) metre gauge CF du Congo Superieur aux Grands Lacs Africains (CFL) between 1913 and 1924. The first eight, numbered 27 to 34, were built in 1913, followed by six more in 1921, numbered 35 to 40. Six more of a slightly larger version followed in 1924, numbered 41 to 46. They had 360 by 460 millimetres (14 by 18 inches) cylinders and 1,050 millimetres (41 inches) diameter driving wheels, with the smaller versions having a working order mass of 28.8 tonnes (28.3 long tons; 31.7 short tons) and the larger versions 33.4 tonnes (32.9 long tons; 36.8 short tons). Most of the CFL was regauged to 3 ft 6 in (1,067 mm) gauge in 1955, as were all of the serving Moguls. Most of them still survived in 1973.

=== Canada ===
A large number of 2-6-0 locomotives were used in Canada, where they were considered more usable in restricted spaces, being shorter than the more common 4-6-0 Ten-Wheelers. Canadian National (CN) had several. One of them, the CN No. 89, an E-10-a class locomotive built by Canadian Locomotive Company in 1910, has been owned and operated since 1973 by the Strasburg Rail Road in Pennsylvania in the US, in conjunction with the Railroad Museum of Pennsylvania. Another one, No. 81, has since its retirement been on public display outdoors in " Palmerston Lions Heritage Park " just south of Main Street in Palmerston, Ontario, Canada. A third one, No. 91, is preserved at the Middletown and Hummelstown Railroad, where it is out of service and undergoing an FRA inspection. A fourth one, No. 96, is preserved and on display at the Age of Steam Roundhouse in Sugarcreek, Ohio.

A well-preserved version, the White Pass and Yukon Route No. 51, can be found at the MacBride Museum of Yukon History in Whitehorse, Yukon.

=== Finland ===
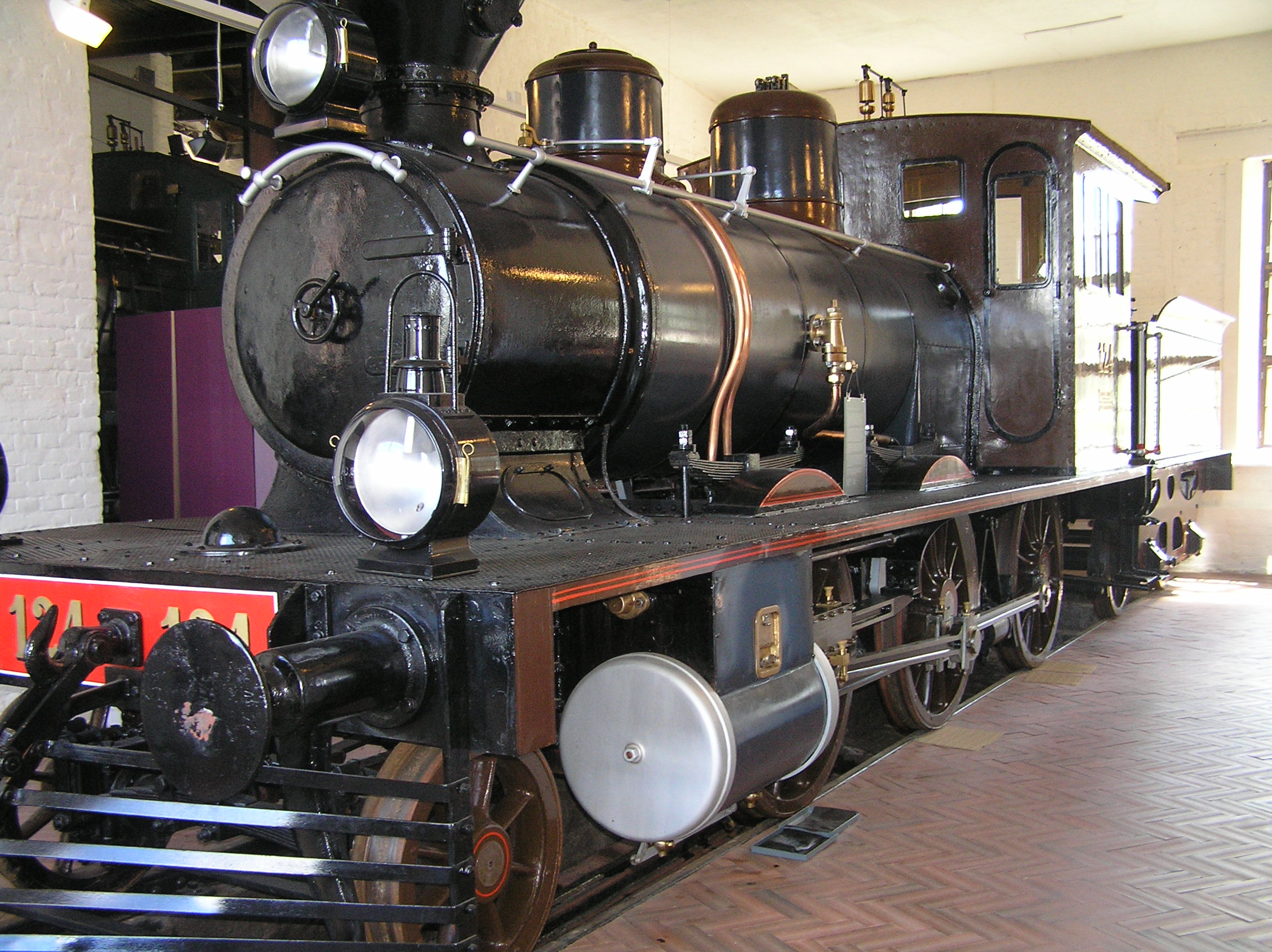
Finnish class Sk1 No 124, built 1885 by Swiss Locomotive & Machine Works, at the Finnish Railway Museum

Finland's 2-6-0 locomotives were the Classes Sk1, Sk2, Sk3, Sk4, Sk5 and Sk6.

Finnish Steam Locomotive Class Sk1s were built from 1885 by Swiss Locomotive & Machine Works. They carried numbers 117 to 131, 134 to 149, 152 to 172 and 183 to 190. These locomotives were nicknamed Little Brown.

Class Sk2 locomotives were numbered 196 to 213, 314 to 321 and 360 to 372. They were built by Tampella. No. 315 is preserved at Tampere in Tampella.

Finnish Steam Locomotive Class Sk3s were built from 1903 by Tammerfors Linne & Jern Manufakt. A.B. They were numbered 173 to 177, 191 to 195, 214 to 221, 334 to 359, 373 to 406 and 427 to 436. These locomotives were nicknamed Grandmothers.

=== Indonesia ===
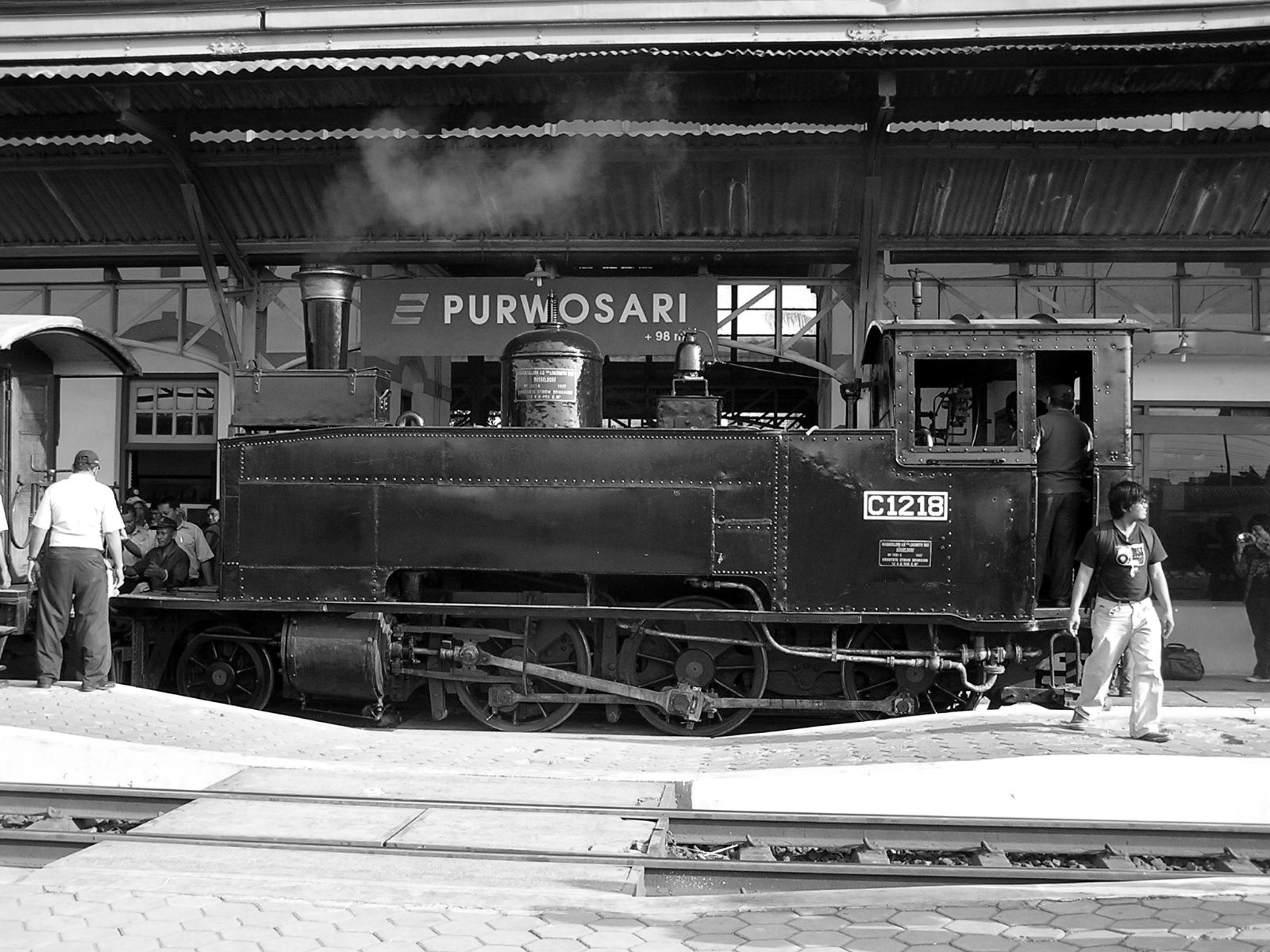
C1218, a preserved 2-6-0 steam locomotive for the Jaladara train.

The State Railway Company of the Dutch East Indies (Staatsspoorwegen, SS) in Indonesia operated 83 units of 2-6-0 tank locomotives of the C12 series, built by Sächsische Maschinenfabrik of Chemnitz, Germany in 1896. They were wood-burning locomotives which consumed two cubic metres of wood and 3,500 litres (770 imperial gallons; 920 US gallons) of water for 4½ hours of steam production.

Of these locomotives, 43 survived the invasion by Japan during the Second World War and were still being operated following independence from the Netherlands. They were based in Cepu in Indonesia and were used on the Cepu-Blora-Purwodadi-Semarang-Bojonegoro-Jatirogo route, now closed.

By the early 1980s, the survivors of the class were in poor condition. One example, C1218 no. 457, was revived in 2002 after twenty-five years, in Ambarawa motive power depot. By mid-2006 it was operational, and since 2009 it was moved to Surakarta, Central Java to haul a chartered steam train across the main street of the heart of Surakarta, named Jaladara.

=== Ireland ===
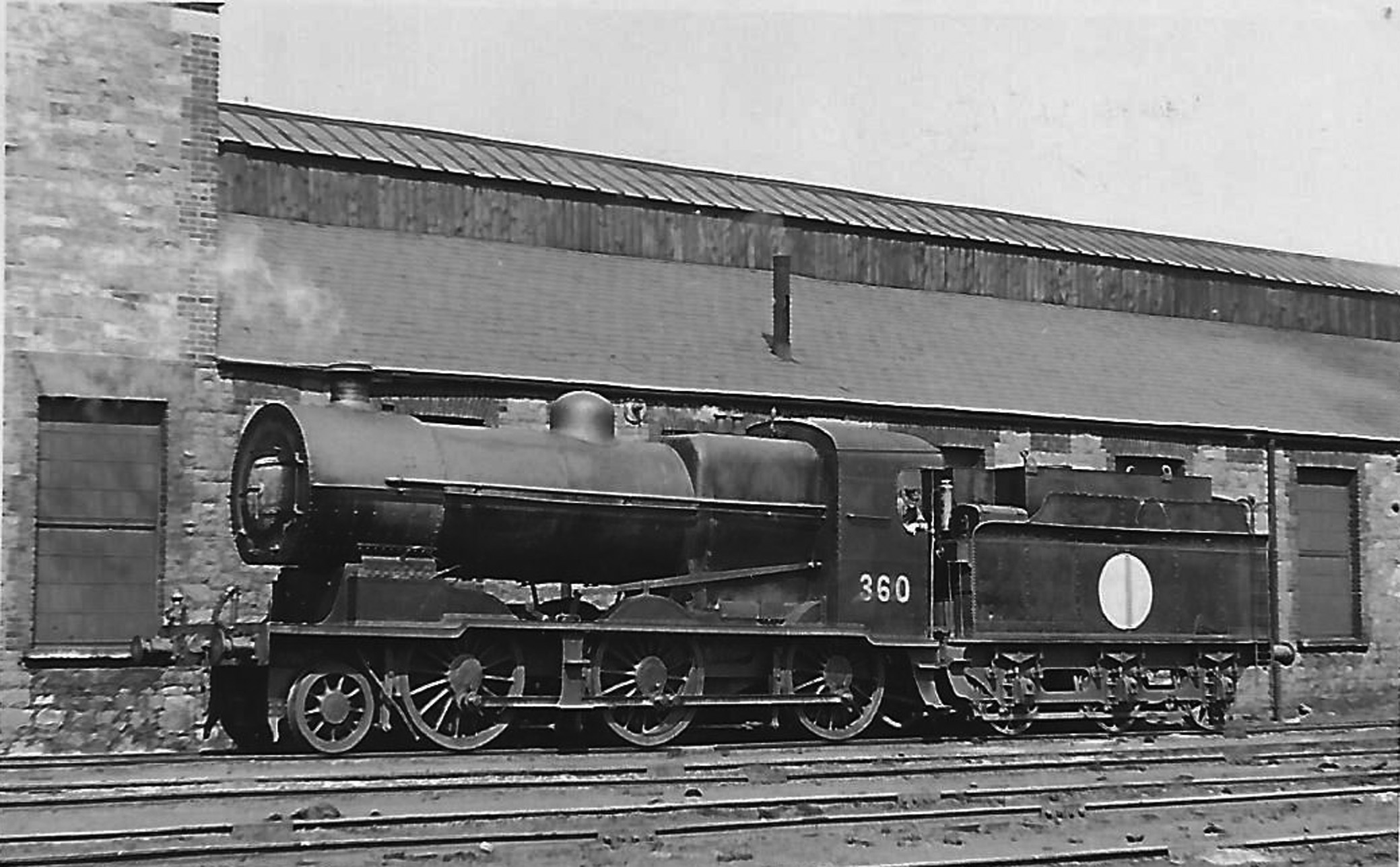
GS&WR Class 355 under CIÉ operation. The white roundel indicates that it burns oil.

Several 2-6-0 locomotive classes found usage on Ireland's railways, mainly with freight trains. The first of these would be the Great Southern and Western Railway Class 355, which were originally built by the North British Locomotive Company as an 0-6-0 type in 1903, but later rebuilt into 2-6-0s after problems occurred; they were soon supplemented with the similar Class 368. Some of these locomotives were converted to oil firing and one even for peat-burning.

Later classes of 2-6-0 include the Dublin and South Eastern Railway nos. 15 and 16 (with no. 15 being preserved), and the Great Southern Railways Classes 372 and 393, the latter of which were based on the British SECR N Class.

=== Italy ===
The Ferrovie dello Stato Italiane came to operate more than 500 2-6-0 locomotives of the Class 625 for mixed traffic and the Class 640 for light passenger trains. These locomotives, nicknamed Little Ladies (Signorine), were very successful and several were preserved after the end of regular steam services, with some still operational for heritage trains.

=== New Zealand ===
The Class J of the New Zealand Railways Department (NZR) was its pioneering tender freight locomotive, introduced in 1877 for use in the re-gauged Canterbury region of the South Island. Built by the Avonside Engine Company and other locomotive works in England, they were shipped to New Zealand in kit form. They eventually served all over New Zealand's fledgling rail network on both islands. In time, they were replaced on mainline running as larger power arrived. Many survived into the 1920s as yard shunters and some were converted to tank locomotives.

=== South Africa ===
==== Cape gauge ====
In 1876 and 1877, the Cape Government Railways (CGR) placed eighteen Mogul locomotives in freight service on the Cape Western system, built by Beyer, Peacock & Company and the Avonside Engine Company. They were designated 1st Class when a classification system was adopted. By 1912, three of them survived to be considered obsolete by the South African Railways (SAR), designated Class 01 and renumbered by having the numeral 0 prefixed to their existing numbers. All were withdrawn from service by 1916.

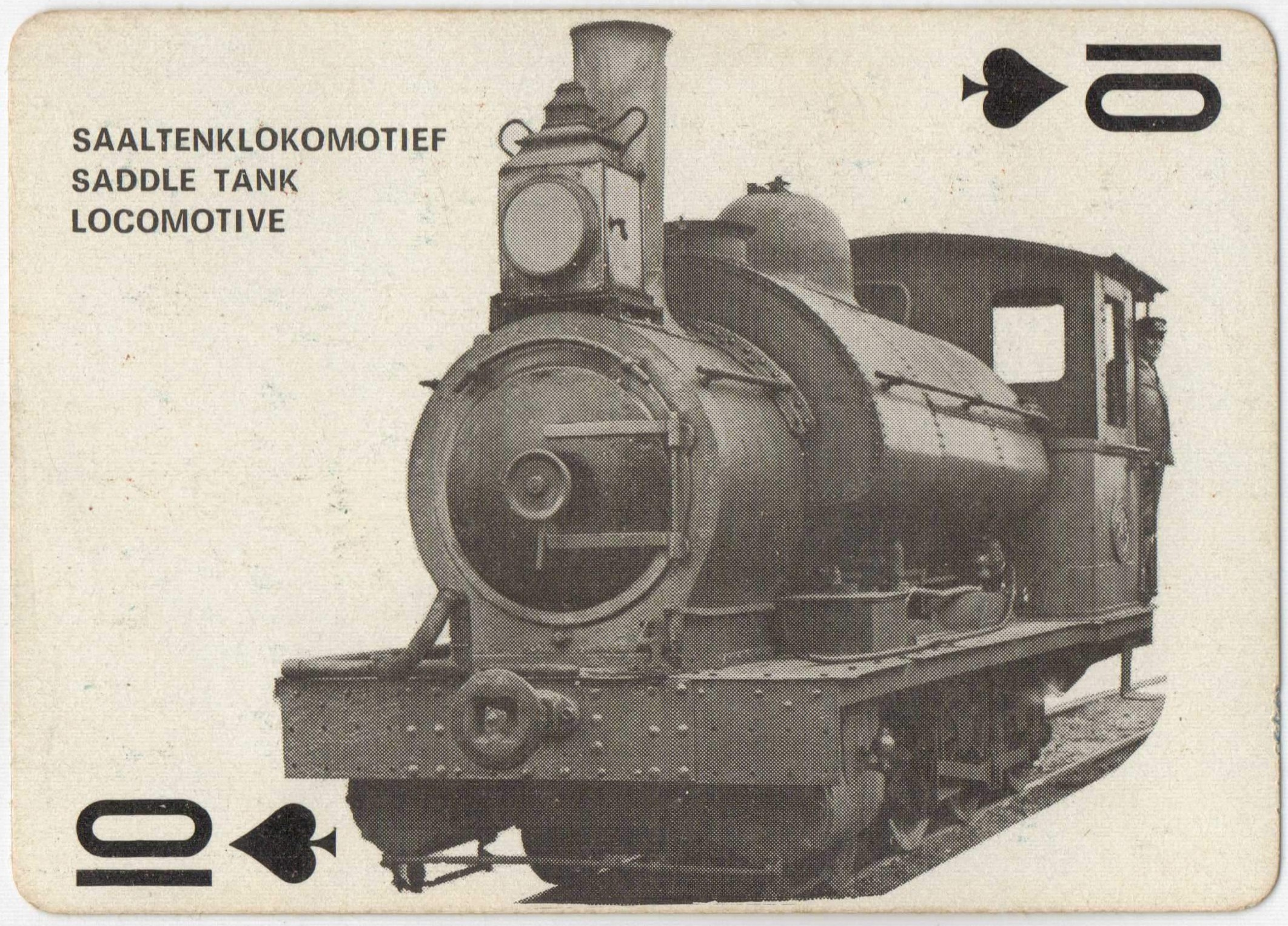
1876 ex back-to-back, T rebuilt to ST

Also in 1876, the CGR placed a pair of Stephenson's Patent back-to-back Mogul type side-tank locomotives in service on the Cape Midland system, built by Kitson & Company. They were later separated and rebuilt to saddle-tank locomotives for use as shunting engines. When a classification system was introduced, they were designated 1st Class.

In 1876 and 1877, the CGR placed eight Mogul tender locomotives in service on the Cape Midland system, also built by Kitson & Company. They were all eventually rebuilt to saddle-tank locomotives for use as shunting engines. When a classification system was adopted, they were also designated 1st Class.

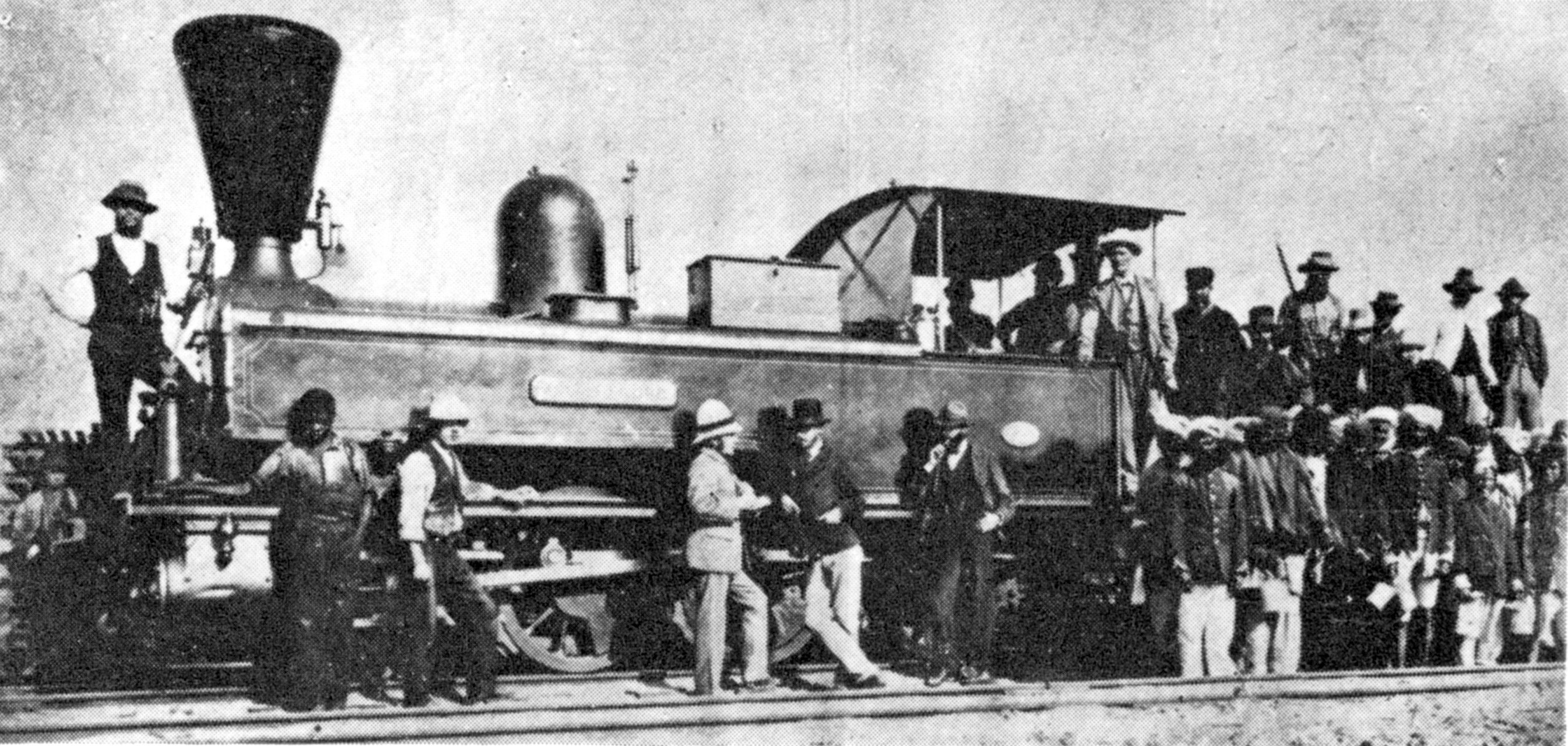
The engine Pietermaritzburg, c. 1878

In 1877, Whythes & Jackson Limited, contracted by the Natal government for the construction of the line from Durban to Pietermaritzburg, took delivery of two 2-6-0 tank locomotives from Kitson & Company for use during construction. The locomotives were not numbered, but were appropriately named Durban and Pietermaritzburg after the two towns which were to be connected by the new railway. Upon completion of the construction contract at the end of 1880, the locomotives were taken over by the Natal Government Railways (NGR) and in 1893 they were sold to the Selati Railway.

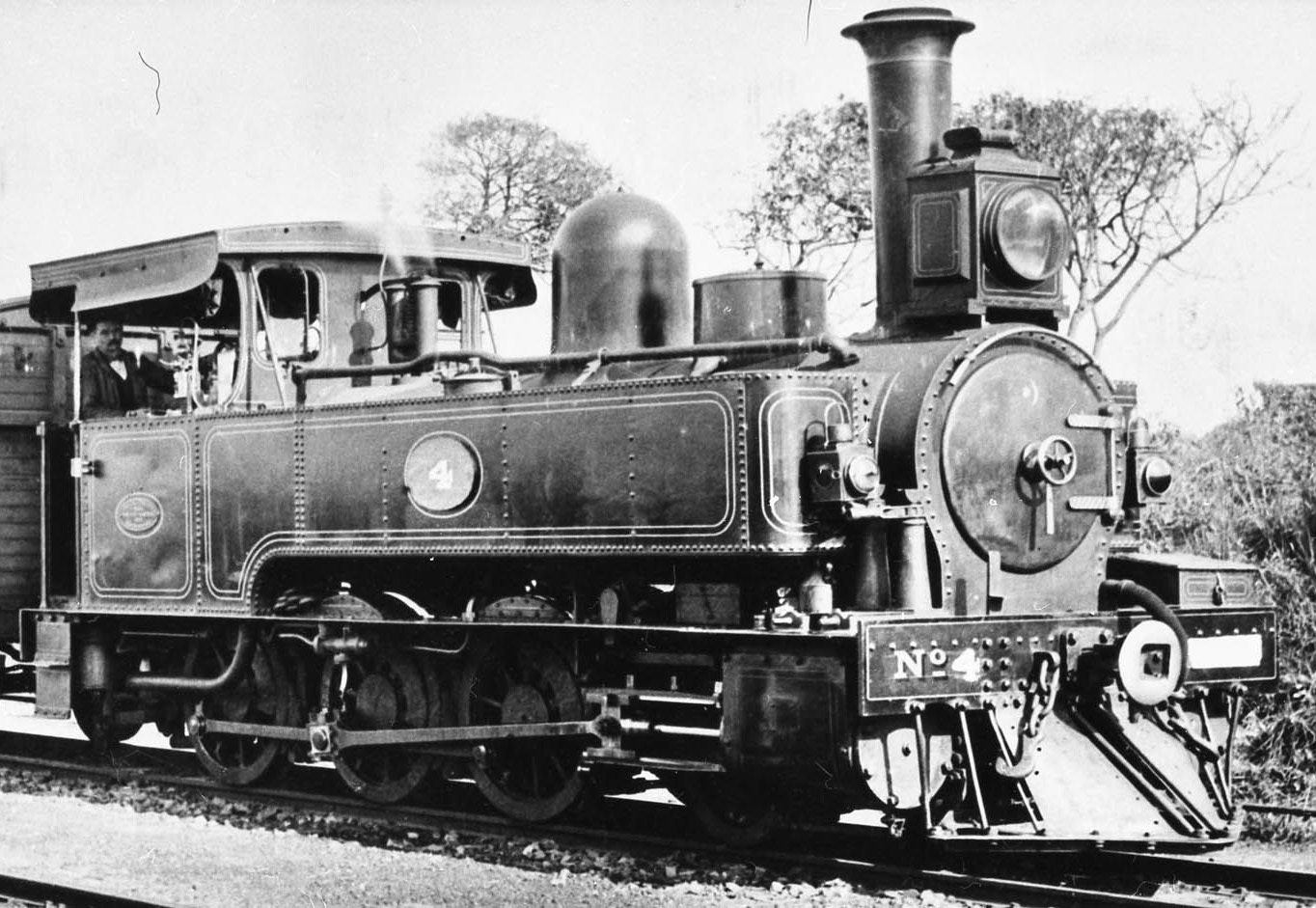
NGR no. 4 after modification, c. 1884

In 1877 and 1878, seven Mogul tank locomotives were also delivered to the NGR by BP, built to the same design as the two contractor's locomotives. Later classified as NGR Class K, they were the first locomotives to be ordered for use on the then newly laid Cape gauge Natal mainline into the interior. One was sold to the East Rand Proprietary Mines and two came into SAR stock in 1912, but remained unclassified as "NGR 2-6-0T Beyer Peacock Sidetank". Although they were considered obsolete, they remained in service as late as 1931.

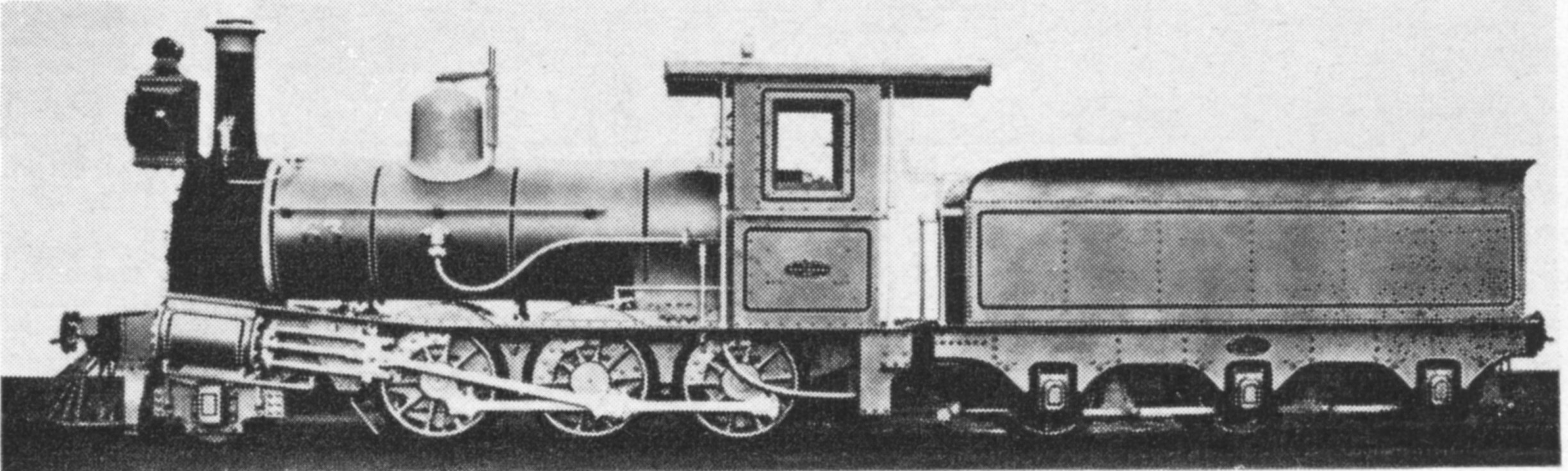
CGR 1st Class of 1879

In 1879 and 1880, the CGR placed ten Moguls, built by Beyer, Peacock and Company, in freight service on the Cape Western system. While similar to the locomotives of 1876, their cylinders were mounted at a downward inclination towards the driving wheelset. They were also designated 1st Class when a classification system was adopted on the CGR.

In 1879, the NGR placed seven 2-6-0T locomotives in service. They were subsequently modified to a 4-6-0T wheel arrangement and were designated NGR Class G. In 1912, when fifteen of them were assimilated into the South African Railways, they were renumbered and reclassified to Class C.

In 1891, the CGR placed two Baldwin-built 2-6-0 Mogul locomotives in freight service, the first American locomotives to enter service in South Africa. They were originally designated 5th Class, but the classification was later changed to 1st Class. One of them still survived in 1912 and was also designated Class 01 by the SAR. It was withdrawn from service in 1920.

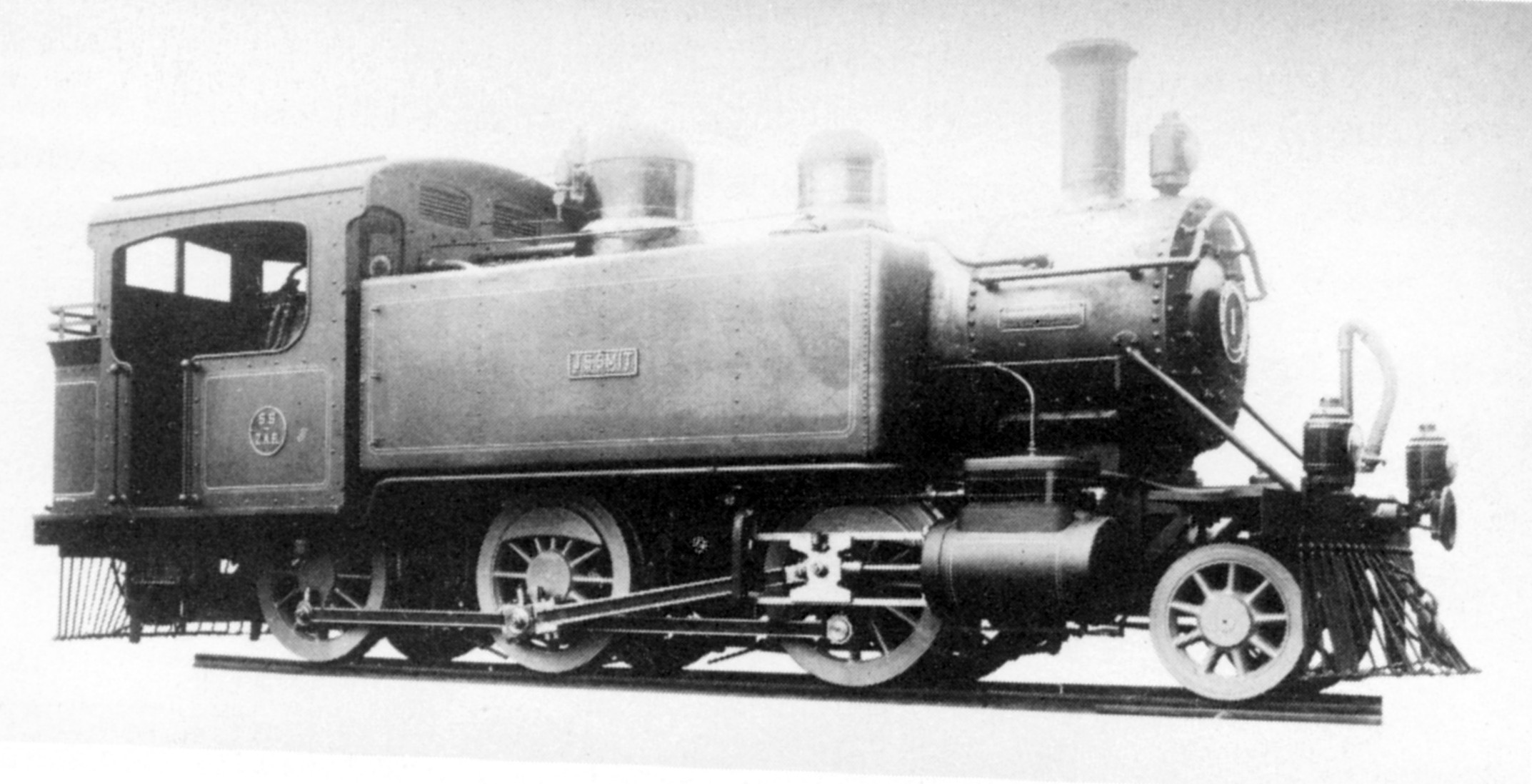
CGR 3rd Class 2-6-0T J.S. Smit

In 1900, while the Second Boer War was still in progress, four 2-6-0T locomotives arrived in the Cape Colony, built by the Dickson Manufacturing Company in 1899. Since they bore cab side-plates inscribed "SS-ZAR" and were named J.S. Smit, J.J. Spier, L.S. Meyer and C. Birkenstock, they were intended for the Netherlands-South African Railway Company (NZASM) in the Zuid-Afrikaansche Republiek (ZAR). They were diverted to Indwe Collieries in the Cape Colony and when the CGR later took control of the colliery line, these locomotives were classified as part of the CGR 3rd Class. All four survived to come into SAR stock in 1912, when they were classified as Class O3. They were withdrawn by 1915.

Also in 1900, two Mogul saddle-tank locomotives entered shunting service at the Port Elizabeth Harbour, followed by one more in 1903.

In 1902, the Zululand Railway Company, contractors for the construction of the North Coast line from Verulam to the Tugela River, acquired two 2-6-0 tender locomotives as construction engines. Upon completion of the line in 1903, the locomotives were taken onto the roster of the Natal Government Railways and designated Class I.

Between 1902 and 1904, eleven Mogul saddle tank locomotives, built by Hunslet Engine Company, were delivered to the Table Bay Harbour Board. All were taken onto the Cape Government Railways roster in 1908 and came into SAR stock in 1912, but were considered obsolete and remained unclassified.

==== Narrow gauge ====
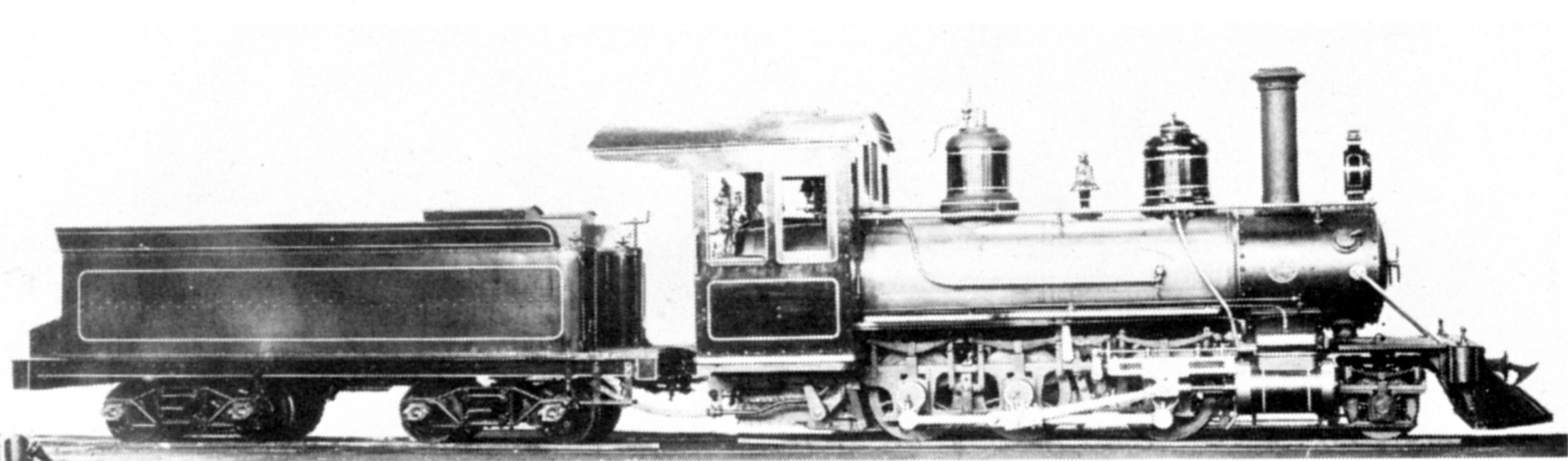
Class NG7, c. 1902

In 1902, the CGR placed three locomotives with a Mogul wheel arrangement in service on the Hopefield 2 ft (610 mm) narrow gauge branch line that was being constructed from Kalbaskraal. They were built by Baldwin and were of a standard type that was being used on the narrow gauge railroads of Maine in the US. A fourth locomotive, identical to the first three, was ordered from the same manufacturer in 1911. In 1912, when these locomotives were assimilated into the South African Railways, they were renumbered with an "NG" prefix to their running numbers. When a system of grouping narrow gauge locomotives into classes was eventually introduced somewhere between 1928 and 1930, they were to be classified as Class NG7 but had already been withdrawn from service.

=== Thailand ===
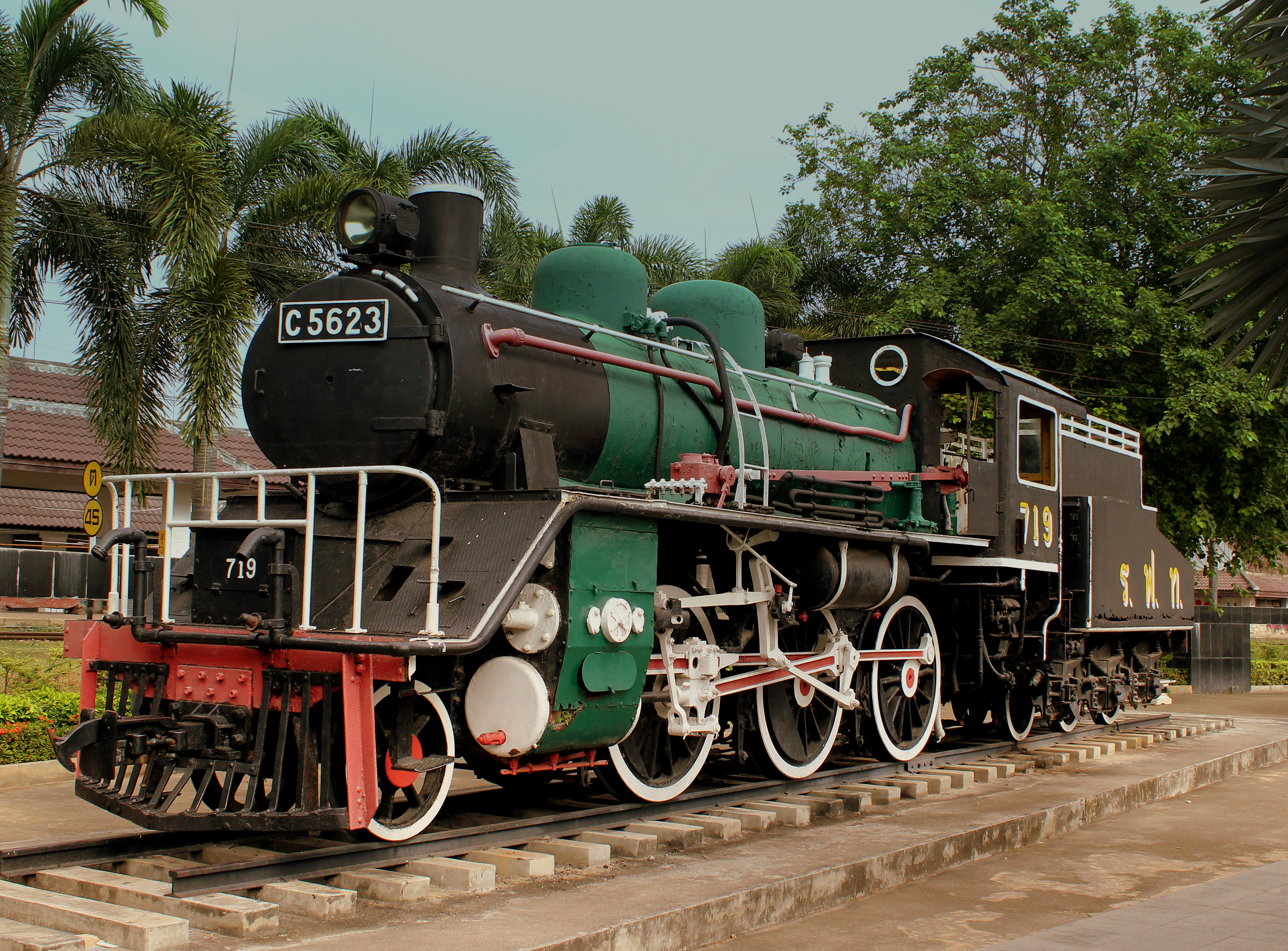
JGR C56 no. C56 23 preserved as SRT 719 plinthed near the River Kwai bridge

The Royal State Railway of Siam (RSR(S)), predecessor to the State Railway of Thailand (SRT), had four classes of 2-6-0 type locomotives in its motive power fleet:

- The first class of 2-6-0s in Thailand were built by Krauss and Co. in batches of 3, 1, and 4, in 1898, 1900, and 1902 respectively, for the standard gauge lines to the north of the country. Their front bogie was a Krauss-Helmholtz bogie and these were the first steam locomotives in Thailand to be fitted with Walschaerts valve gear. However, these engines were fired on wood, and so, their steaming qualities were hampered since they were designed as coal burners rather than wood burners.
- The second class of 2-6-0s in Thailand were also built by Krauss in batches of 2 and 1 in 1901 and 1912 respectively, for the metre gauge lines to the south of the country. These resembled the standard gauge 2-6-0s Krauss supplied earlier to the standard gauge network of Thailand, also being fitted with the Krauss-Helmholtz bogie. Another two were also built by Krauss but the Great War blocked the delivery of these locomotives, later finding work with the Imperial German Army and postwar, on a private railway. Later, these locomotives would be given a class designation, as their class C.
- The third class of 2-6-0s in Thailand were built by Hanomag (Hanover Locomotive Works) in batches of 1, 3, 7, and 2 in 1906, 1907, 1908, and 1910, respectively. The first of these locomotives was commissioned by the RSR as a response to the steaming issues that hampered the standard gauge Krauss 2-6-0s, resulting in a design based on the Prussian G 5 class locomotives, and were fitted with Allan straight link valve gear and an Adams radial axle for the front bogie.
- The fourth class of 2-6-0s in Thailand were 46 of the Japanese C56 class locomotives, brought over to run the Burma Railway. Initially, 90 of these locomotives were brought over for these purposes, but their numbers had been reduced to 46 by the war's end.

The standard gauge Krauss locomotives would receive no gauge conversion with the standardisation of the Thai railways to metre gauge in 1930, and were all scrapped by late March in the same year.

The metre gauge Krauss locomotives had 4 remaining members left around 1938.

The standard gauge Hanomag locomotives, on the other hand, received gauge conversions upon metre gauge standardisation from 1924-28 when Makkasan works received the necessary equipment to conduct rolling stock gauge conversion. These locomotives would run until the 1950s.

The C56s brought to Thailand would later be inherited by the State Railway of Thailand, and several of these would be preserved. Two Thai C56 locomotives have been repatriated to Japan: they are nos. C56 31—still with its Thai ABC (Note: Automatic Buffer Coupler; these kinds of couplers were commonplace on Thai rolling stock until the mid-century.) coupler intact, and C56 44, respectively nos. 725 and 735 of the Thai railways.

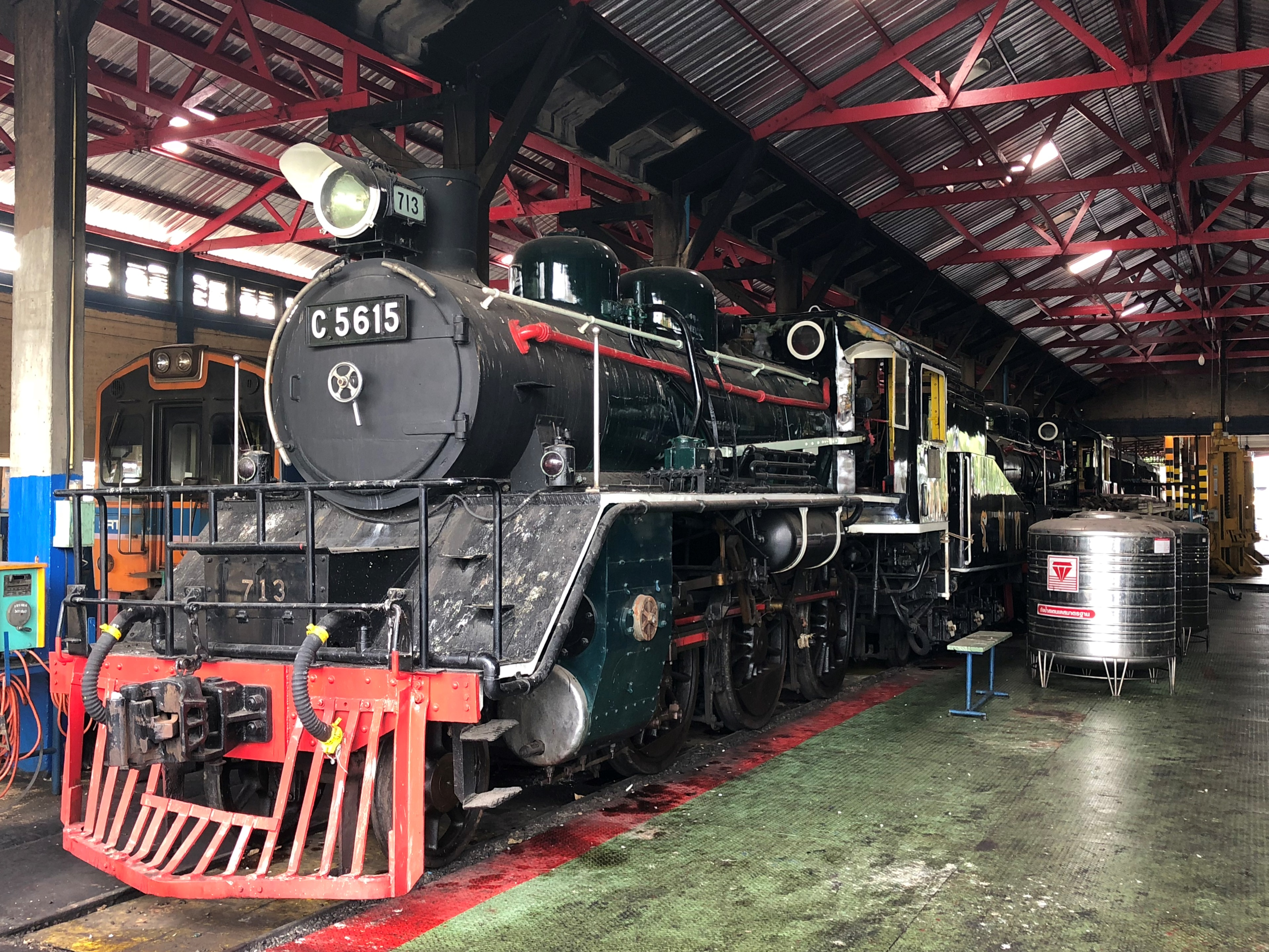
C56 15 preserved as SRT 713 at Thonburi engine shed; behind it is C56 17 preserved as SRT 715, February 2018

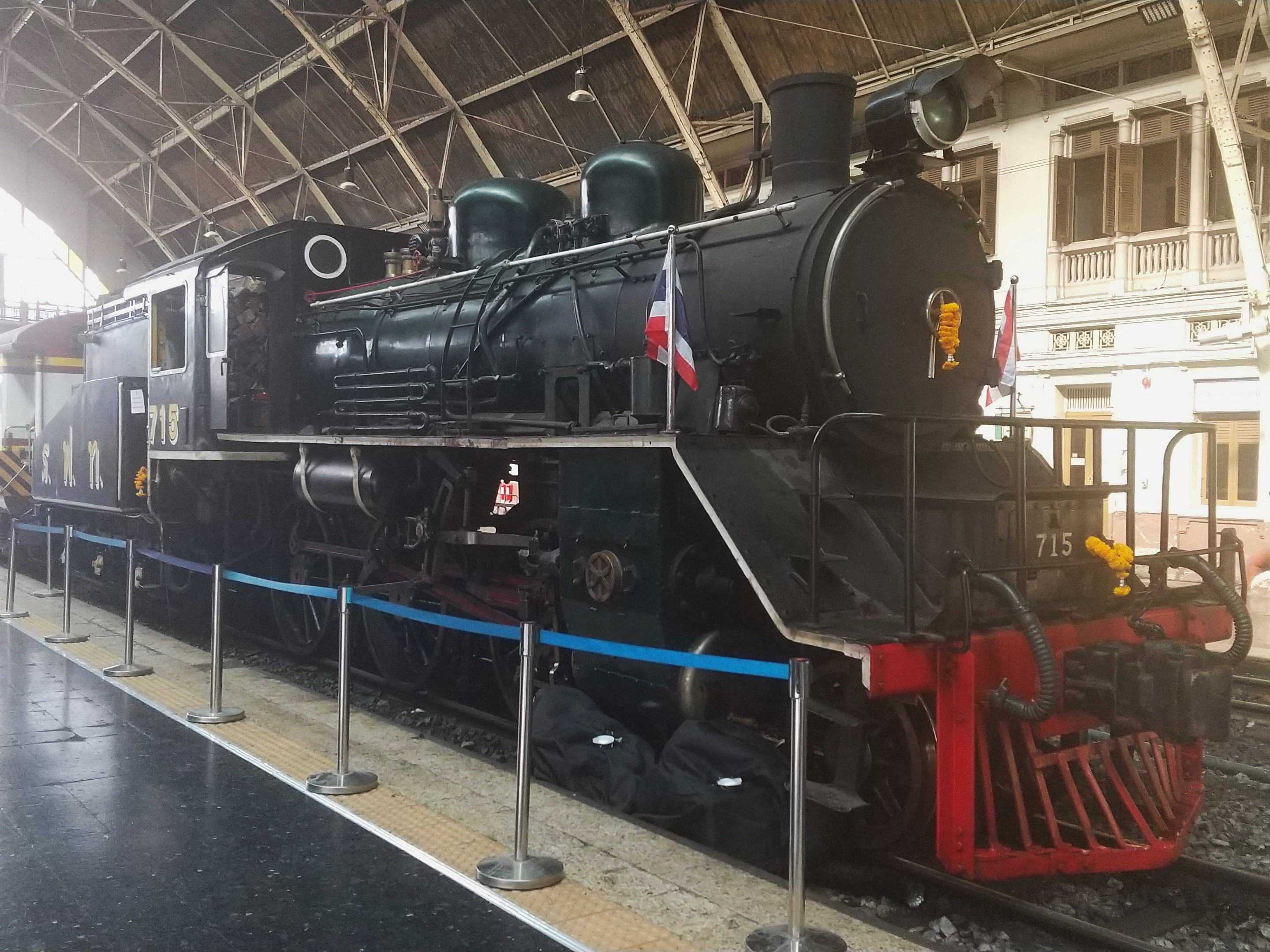
C56 17 preserved as SRT 715 displayed at Hua Lamphong railway station, March 2023

Nos. 713 and 715 have been retained in working order for the annual son et lumière show at the River Kwai bridge.

=== United Kingdom ===
In the United Kingdom, where locomotives are generally smaller than in the US, the 2-6-0 was found to be a good wheel arrangement for mixed-traffic locomotives.

Circa 1870, one 2-6-0T engine was built for the Garstang and Knot-End Railway. The first unsuccessful examples were fifteen locomotives built to a design of William Adams for the Great Eastern Railway in 1878–79.

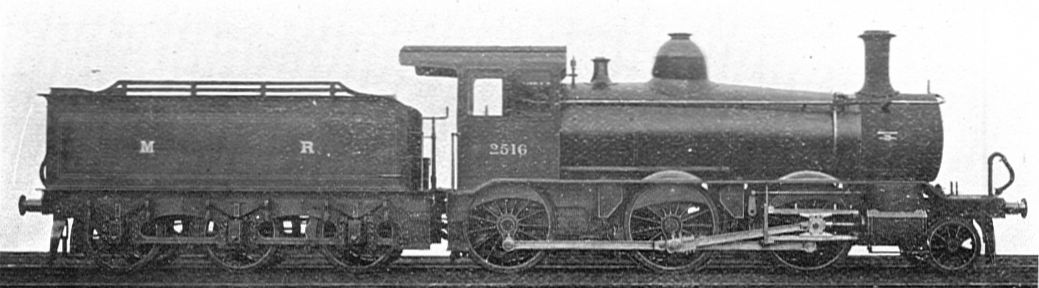
Schenectady-built MR no. 2516

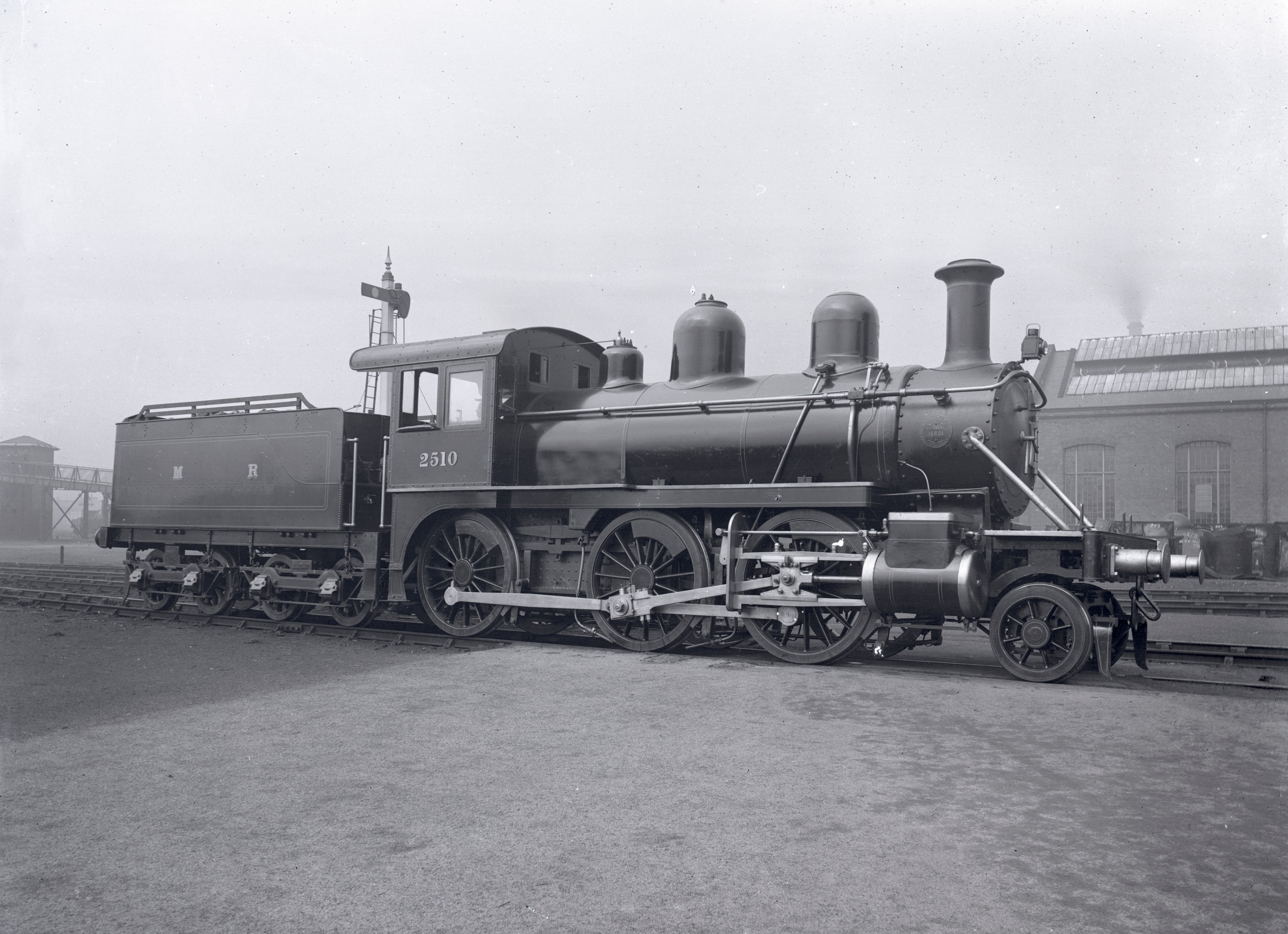
Midland Railway Baldwin no. 2510

The Midland and South Western Junction Railway acquired two examples built to an Australian design by Beyer, Peacock and Company in 1895 and 1897.

A long strike by workers throughout the British engineering industry in 1898/1899 led to a backlog of locomotive orders. This led leading British companies to place orders with American builders for standard light general-purpose locomotives adapted to British requirements. In 1899, the Midland Railway (MR), the Great Northern Railway (GNR) and the Great Central Railway (GCR) all purchased examples from the Baldwin Locomotive Works in the US. The MR also bought ten from Schenectady Locomotive Works at the same time. In the United States, the 2-6-0 was already the common design for this sort of engine, and these imports were to be very influential in introducing the wheel arrangement to the United Kingdom.

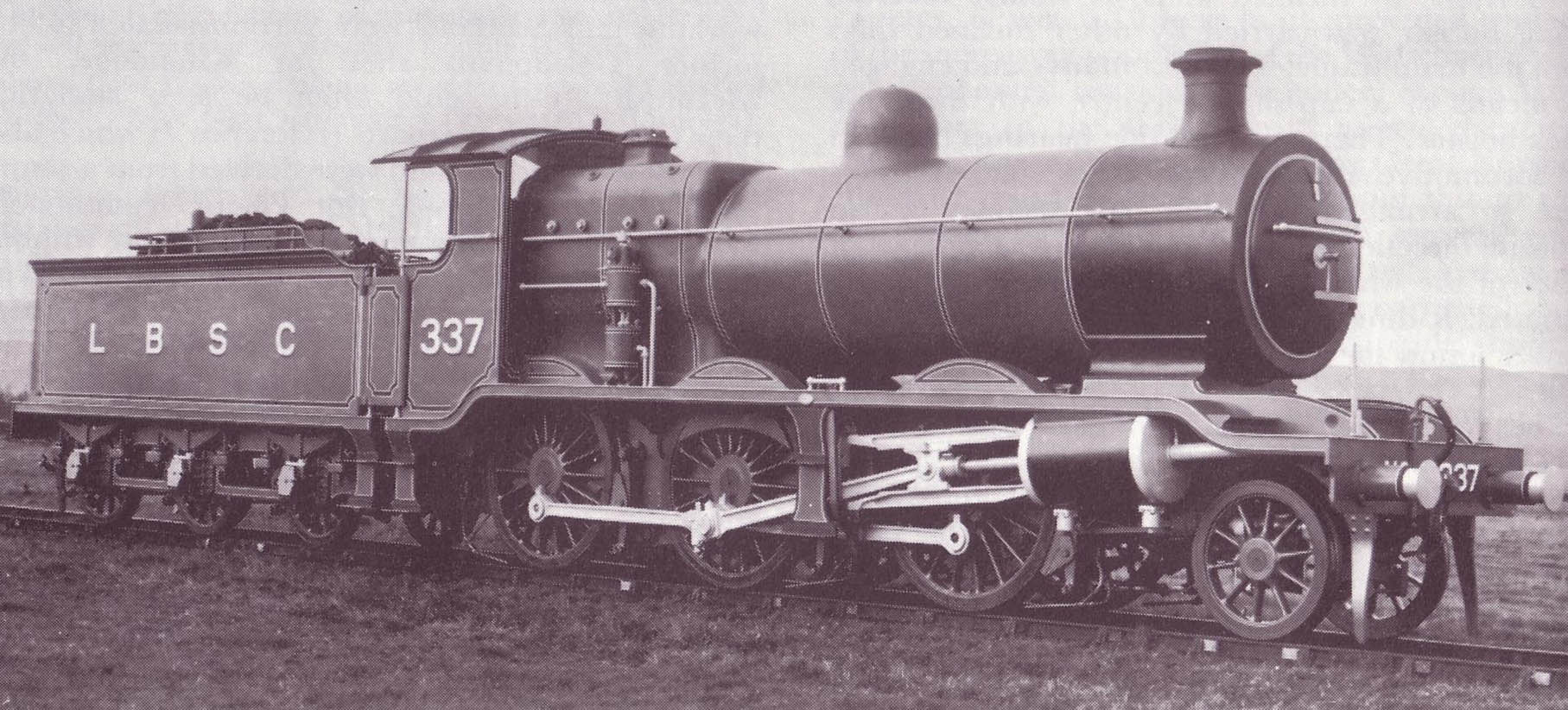
LB&SCR K class of 1913

At the time of the Grouping in 1923, 2-6-0 locomotives were already operated by the Great Western Railway (2600 and 4300 classes of 1900 and 1911 respectively), the Caledonian Railway (34 class, 1912), the London, Brighton and South Coast Railway (K class, 1913), the Glasgow and South Western Railway (403 class, 1915), the GNR (H2, H3 and H4 classes, 1920), and the South Eastern and Chatham Railway (N class, 1922).

Several of these designs continued to be built by the Big Four after 1923, and several new and successful designs were introduced so that the 2-6-0 became the principal type for medium-loaded mixed-traffic duties. Notable new designs included the London, Midland and Scottish Railway’s Hughes Crab (1926), the Southern Railway's U class (1928), the Stanier Mogul (1934), the Ivatt Class 2 (1946), the Ivatt Class 4 (1947), the London and North Eastern Railway’s Class K4 (1937) and the Thompson/Peppercorn K1 class which were built in 1949–50 after the nationalisation of British Railways.

British Railways continued to build the Ivatt and Thompson/Peppercorn designs and then introduced three standard designs, based on the Ivatt classes. These were the Standard Class 2 in 1952, the Standard Class 4 in 1952 and the Standard Class 3 in 1954. 2-6-0 locomotives continued to be built until 1957 and the last ones were withdrawn from service in 1968.

=== United States ===
The first true 2-6-0s with single-axle swivelling leading trucks were built in the United States in 1860 for the Louisville and Nashville Railroad. The New Jersey Locomotive and Machine Company built their first 2-6-0 in 1861, as the Passaic for the Central Railroad of New Jersey. The Erie Railroad followed in 1862 with the first large order of this locomotive type. In 1863, Rogers Locomotive & Machine Works built more for the New Jersey Railroad and Transportation Company.

The Baltimore & Ohio (B&O) no. 600, a 2-6-0 Mogul built at the B&O's Mount Clare Shops in 1875, won first prize the following year at the 1876 Centennial Exposition in Philadelphia. It is preserved at the National Museum of Railroad History & Innovation, housed in the former Mount Clare shops in Baltimore.

Well over 11,000 Moguls were constructed in the United States by the time production had ended in 1910. Very few of these classic steam locomotives still exist, most of them having been scrapped as newer, faster and more powerful steam engines were developed in the twentieth century. The USRA standard designs of 1918 did not include a 2-6-0, though the USRA 0-6-0 was designed so that it could be converted into a 2-6-0, with the Colorado Midland being the only known railroad to have done this.

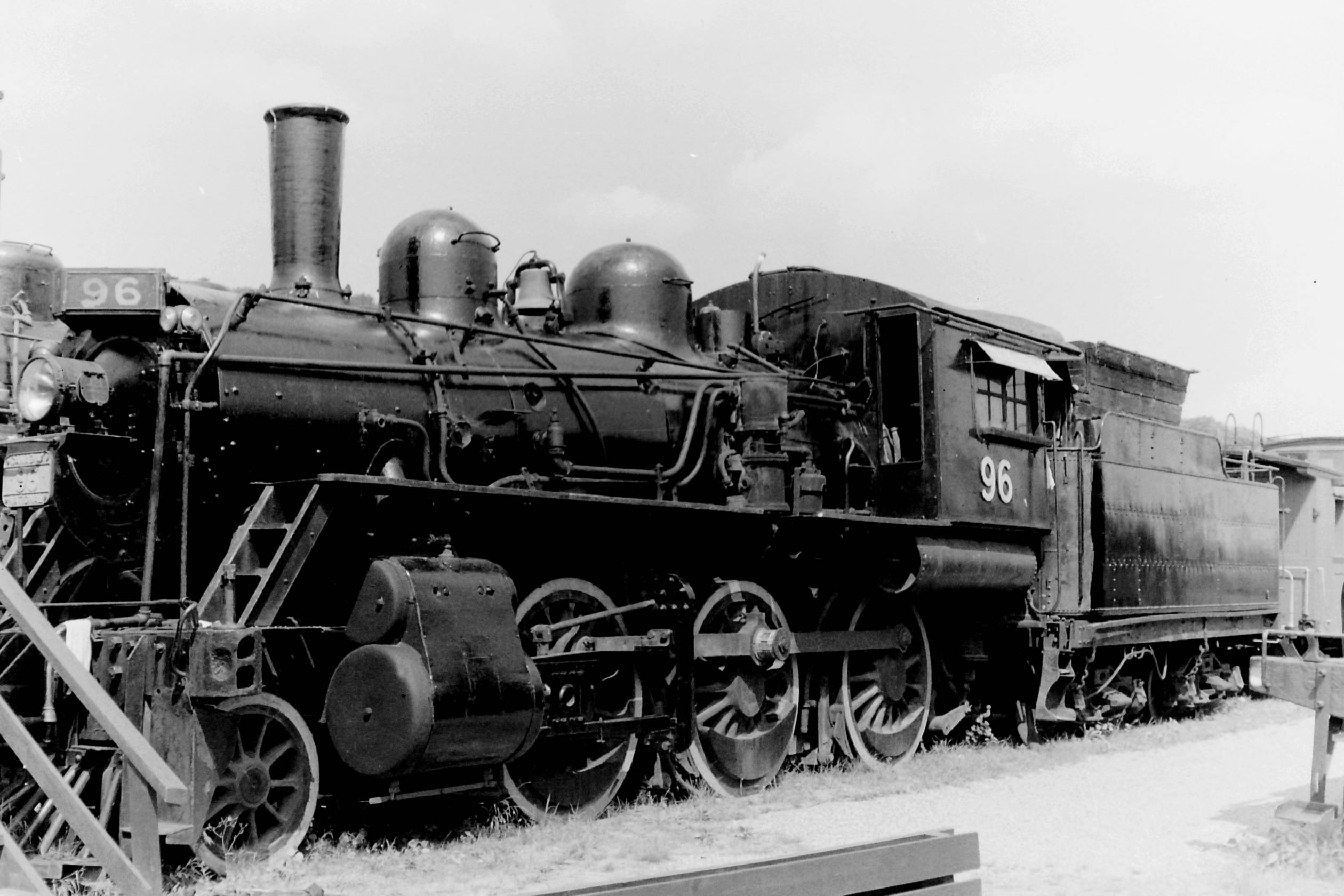
Canadian National 2-6-0 No. 96, August 1970

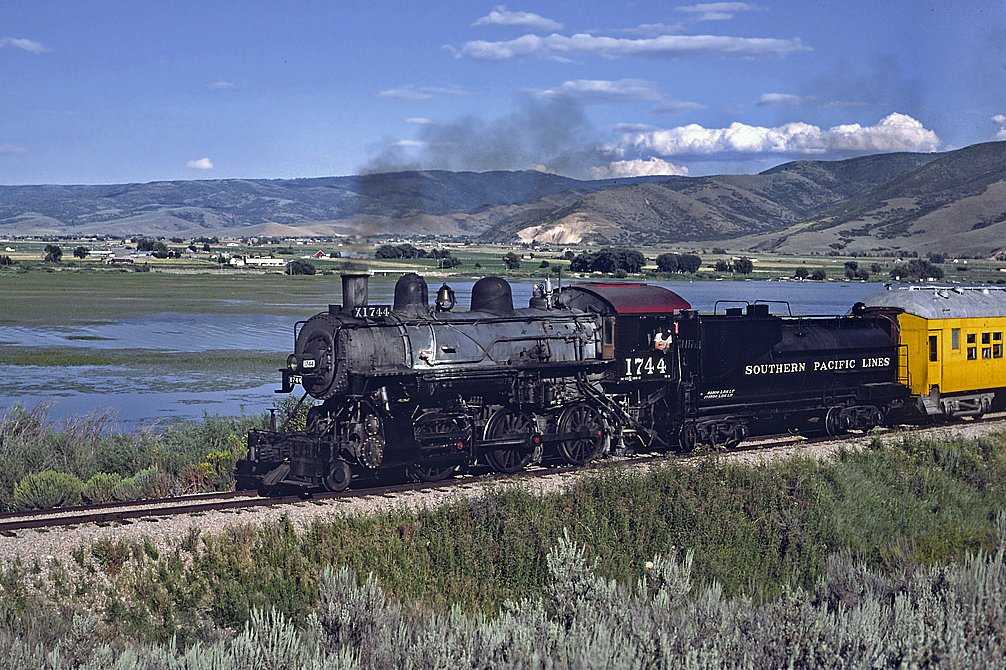
Southern Pacific 2-6-0 No. 1744, 1982.

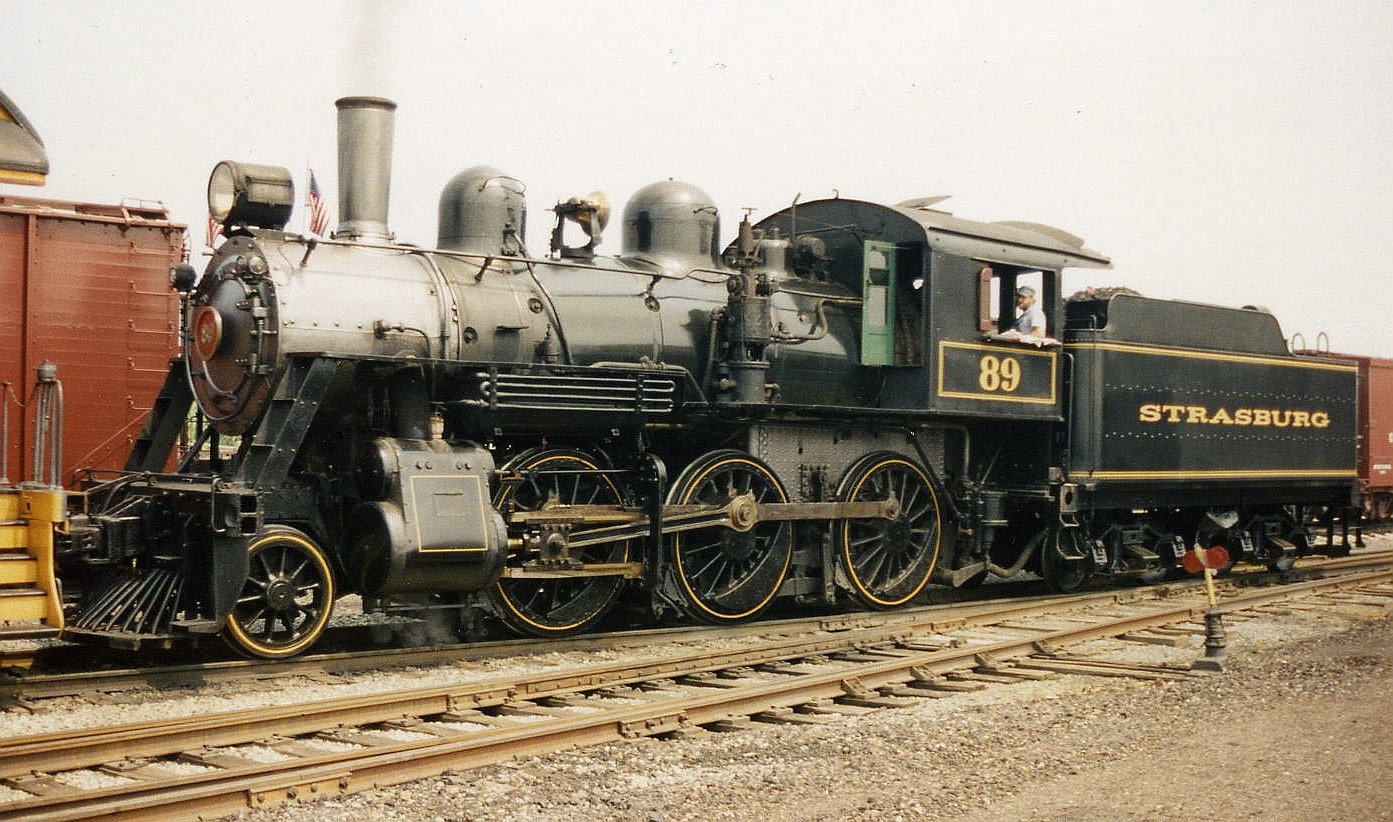
Canadian National 2-6-0 No. 89, 1993.

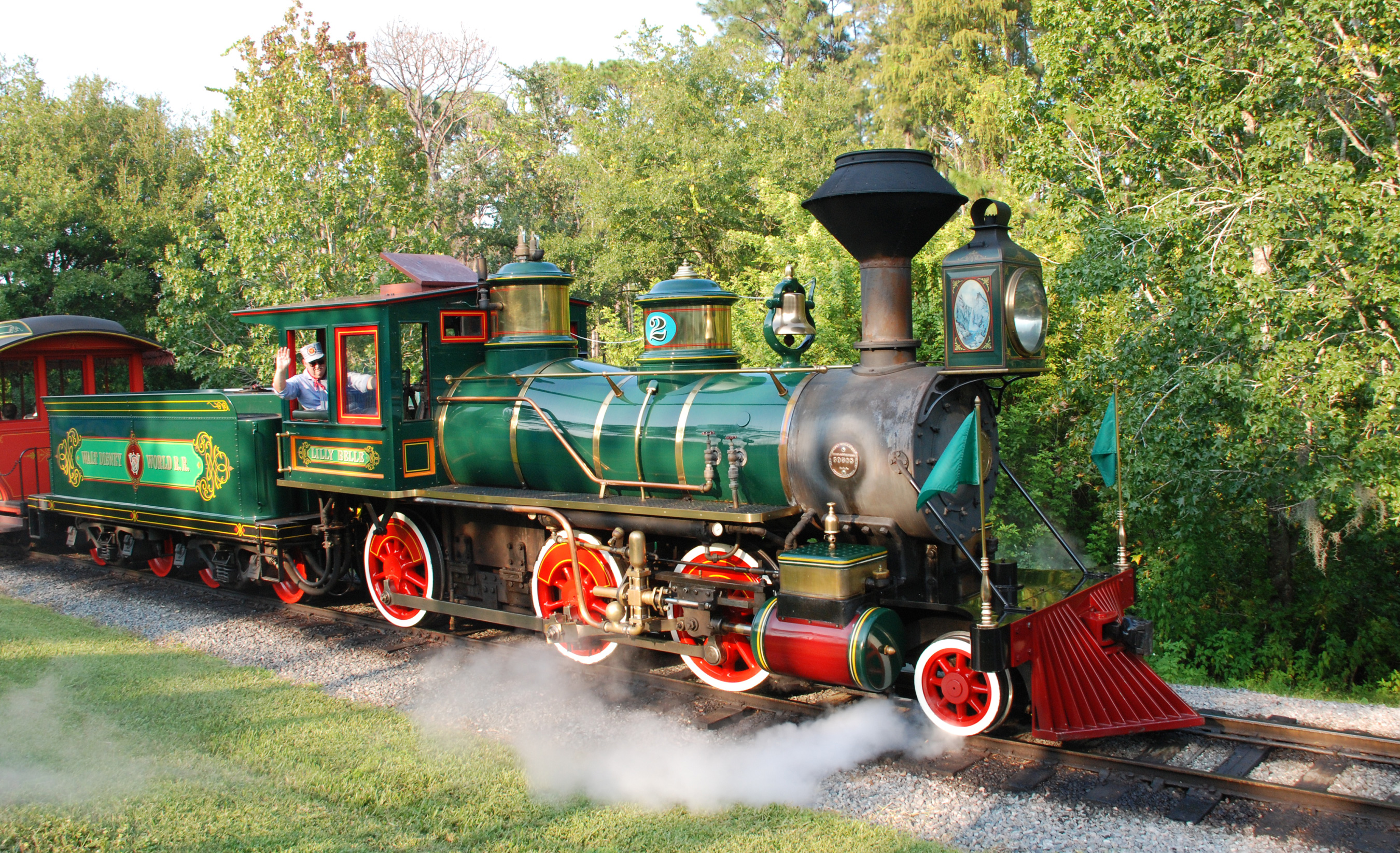
WDWRR No. 2 Lilly Belle, built in 1928.

Five notable 2-6-0 locomotives are still in operation in the United States.

- Southern Pacific No. 1744 has spent more time out of service than it did under its own power in the preservation era. It is now being planned to operate on the Niles Canyon Railway in Sunol, California.
- Ex New Berlin & Winfield Railroad No. 2, built by the Baldwin Locomotive Works in 1906, was rebuilt and is maintained by the Midwest Central Railroad.
- Walt Disney World Railroad (WDWRR) No. 2 Lilly Belle, built in September 1928 by the Baldwin Locomotive Works as No. 76 (later No. 260) for the United Railways of Yucatán in Mexico, operates on the railroad circling the Magic Kingdom in Orlando, Florida since 1 October 1971. Due to mechanical problems, this locomotive was used exclusively for daily park opening ceremonies until it was shipped to the Strasburg Rail Road for an extensive overhaul in 2010. In late July 2016, it returned to the Magic Kingdom and resumed service on November 23, 2016.
- Canadian National 89 operates in excursion service on the Strasburg Rail Road in Strasburg, Pennsylvania.
- Canadian National 91 operates in excursion service on the Middletown and Hummelstown Railroad in Hummelstown, Pennsylvania and is out of service undergoing an FRA inspection.
- Everett Railroad 11 operates tourist trains on the Hollidaysburg, Pennsylvania-based shortline.

Preserved non-operating examples include:

- The Virginia & Truckee Railroad No. 13, Empire at the California State Railroad Museum in Sacramento, California.
- The Canadian National Railways No. 96 at the Age of Steam Roundhouse in Sugarcreek, Ohio.
