= Age of Steam Roundhouse =

Locomotive roundhouse museum in Sugarcreek, Ohio

Coordinates: 40°28′44.44″N 81°39′58.88″W

Age of Steam Roundhouse Museum
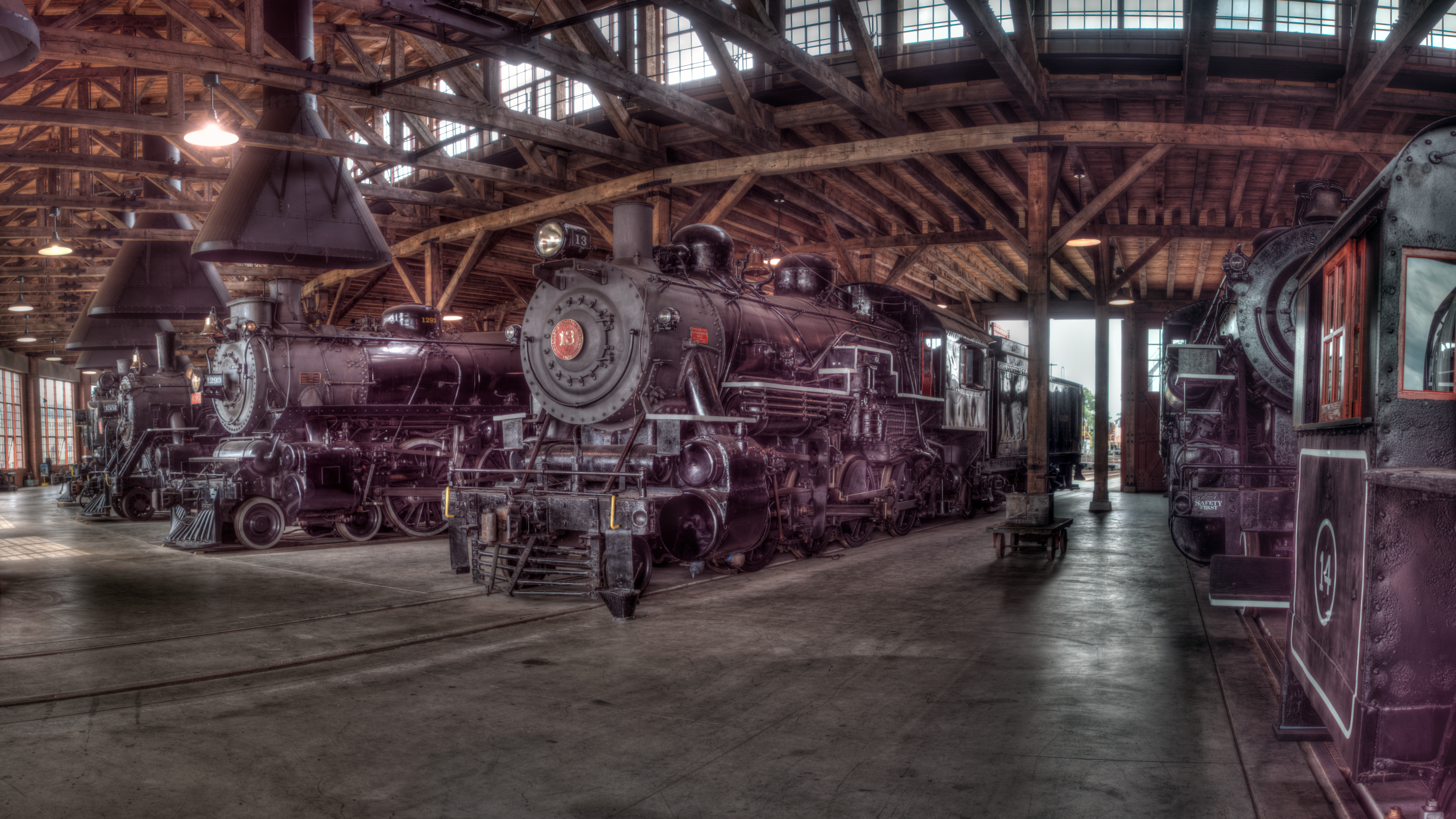
- Inside the Age of Steam Roundhouse
- Established: 2011
- Location: Sugarcreek, Ohio
- Type: Vintage steam and diesel locomotives, and other rail equipment
- Collection size: 55
- Directors: Noel Poirier (2018–2021); Peter J. Poremba (2021–2025); Nathan Vance (2025–present)
- Presidents: Jerry Joe Jacobson (2011–2017); Bill Strawn (2017–2021); Peter J. Poremba (2021–present)
- Website: www.ageofsteamroundhouse.org

The Age of Steam Roundhouse Museum, located in Sugarcreek, Ohio, United States, is a museum roundhouse housing steam and diesel locomotives, passenger cars and other vintage United States and Canadian railroad equipment, built and opened in 2011.

== History ==
The roundhouse was built by Jerry Joe Jacobson, former CEO of the Ohio Central Railroad System (OHCR). In October 2008, Jacobson sold his interest in OCRS to Genesee & Wyoming, including the track, modern equipment, and most of the workshops and depots. Jacobson kept a collection of vintage steam and diesel locomotives, other old equipment, and a depot at Sugarcreek, Ohio. He bought 34 acres in Sugarcreek and began constructing a roundhouse to house his collection. The roundhouse building was completed in 2011 and all of the steam locomotives, along with a few other select pieces of rolling stock in Jacobson's collection, were moved inside the roundhouse that same year. It was the "first large roundhouse built in the United States since 1951," with the previous building being Nickel Plate Road's roundhouse in its Calumet Yard. As of 2012, the Age of Steam Roundhouse's website outlines its goals as:

- Preserve the steam locomotives, historic diesels, passenger cars, and other railroad relics in the collection of Jerry Joe Jacobson.
- Build a full-scale, operating, and realistic roundhouse and back shop to overhaul, repair, and maintain Jerry’s rolling stock.
- Operate the steam locomotives on freight trains.
- Display railroad heritage for future generations.

The project was paid for by Jacobson and his wife, Laura. They set up an endowment to support the museum. Architect F. A. Goodman says the building is 48,000 square feet and of "solid masonry walls" and "heavy timber framing". It has 18 stalls, each of which is large enough for a locomotive and its tender. The Goodman company says the roundhouse is one of the largest heavy timber structures in America.

== Steam locomotives ==
Locomotive details
Number	Image	Heritage	Wheel classification	Built	Builder	Status	Notes
1		Cuban Sugar	0-4-0CA	1915	H.K. Porter	Display	Fireless locomotive Compressed Air locomotive.
2		Columbus & Southern Ohio Electric Company	0-4-0F	1940	Heisler Locomotive Works	Display	Fireless, from Sharon, Pennsylvania.
3		Southern Wood Preserving Company	0-4-0T	1926	American Locomotive Company	Display, awaiting a rebuild	
9		McCloud Railway	2-6-2	1901	Baldwin Locomotive Works	Display, awaiting restoration	Purchased from the Kettle Moraine Scenic Railroad, Wisconsin.
12		Morehead & North Fork	0-6-0	1905	American Locomotive Company	Operational	Built as Southern Railway No. 1643.
13		Brooklyn Eastern District Terminal	0-6-0T	1919	H.K. Porter	Display	Purchased from the Railroad Museum of Pennsylvania.
13		Buffalo Creek and Gauley Railroad	2-8-0	1920	American Locomotives Company	Display, awaiting restoration	
19		McCloud River Railroad	2-8-2	1915	Baldwin Locomotive Works	Operational	Purchased from the Yreka Western Railroad and the Oregon, Pacific and Eastern Railway. No. 19 was used as OP&E No. 19 in the 1973 Robert Aldrich film Emperor of the North (Pole). It made its first test run in March 2026 and hauled its first excursion train on April 9, 2026.
33		Lake Superior and Ishpeming Railroad	2-8-0	1916	Baldwin Locomotive Works	Display, awaiting 1,472-day inspection and overhaul	First from the Munising, Marquette and Southeastern as No. 44, No. 33 operated on the LS&I until 1962. Owned by the Hocking Valley Scenic Railway from 1965 to 2003, when it first arrived at the Ohio Central.
37		Sugar Pine Lumber Company	2-8-2T	1925	American Locomotive Company	Display	Purchased from the Timber Heritage Association.
96		Canadian National	2-6-0	1910	Canadian Locomotive Company	Display	Purchased from Steamtown USA.
105		Sturm & Dillard Co.	0-6-0	1917	Baldwin Locomotive Works	Display	Purchased from the Orrville Railroad Heritage Society.
401		Alabama, Tennessee and Northern Railroad	2-10-0	1928	Baldwin Locomotive Works	Display	Purchased from the Mid-Continent Railway Museum.
643		Bessemer and Lake Erie Railroad	2-10-4	1944	Baldwin Locomotive Works	Display	Purchased from a private owner in McKees Rocks, Pennsylvania, largest locomotive in the collection. Nicknamed The King.
727		U.S. Steel	0-4-0T	1897	H.K. Porter	Display	From Sewickley, Pennsylvania
763		New York, Chicago and St. Louis Railroad	2-8-4	1944	Lima Locomotive Works	Display, awaiting possible restoration	Purchased from the Virginia Museum of Transportation
1187		Reading Company	0-4-0	1903	Baldwin Locomotive Works	Display	Purchased from the Strasburg Rail Road, No. 1187 was recently acquired from Strasburg from an auction on July 15, 2020, and left Strasburg on July 31, 2020.
1190		Baltimore and Ohio Railroad	0-6-0	1904	American Locomotive Company	Display	
1278		Canadian Pacific Railway	4-6-2	1948	Canadian Locomotive Company	Display	Purchased from the Gettysburg Railroad, No. 1278 suffered a crown sheet failure in 1995, underwent a partial cosmetic restoration from 2016 to 2017.
1293		Canadian Pacific Railway	4-6-2	1948	Canadian Locomotive Company	Undergoing 1,472-day inspection and overhaul	Age of Steam's primary locomotive/locomotive power.
1308		Chesapeake and Ohio	2-6-6-2	1949	Baldwin Locomotive Works	Stored	Museums' 25th acquired steam locomotive and the only articulated steam locomotive in the collection. Previously owned by the Collis P. Huntington Railroad Historical Society, Inc.
1551		Canadian National	4-6-0	1912	Montreal Locomotive Works	Display, awaiting restoration	Traded from Steamtown in exchange for BLW No. 26 in 1986.
2630		US Army	2-8-0	1943	Baldwin Locomotive Works	Display	Purchased from the Southeastern Railway Museum, USATC S160 Class. Cosmetically restored.
3960		Wheeling and Lake Erie	0-6-0	1935	W&LE Brewster Shops	Display, awaiting in-depth cosmetic restoration	Purchased from Canton, Ohio.
6325		Grand Trunk Western Railroad	4-8-4	1943	American Locomotives Company	Display	Purchased from Battle Creek, Michigan.

== Diesel locomotives ==
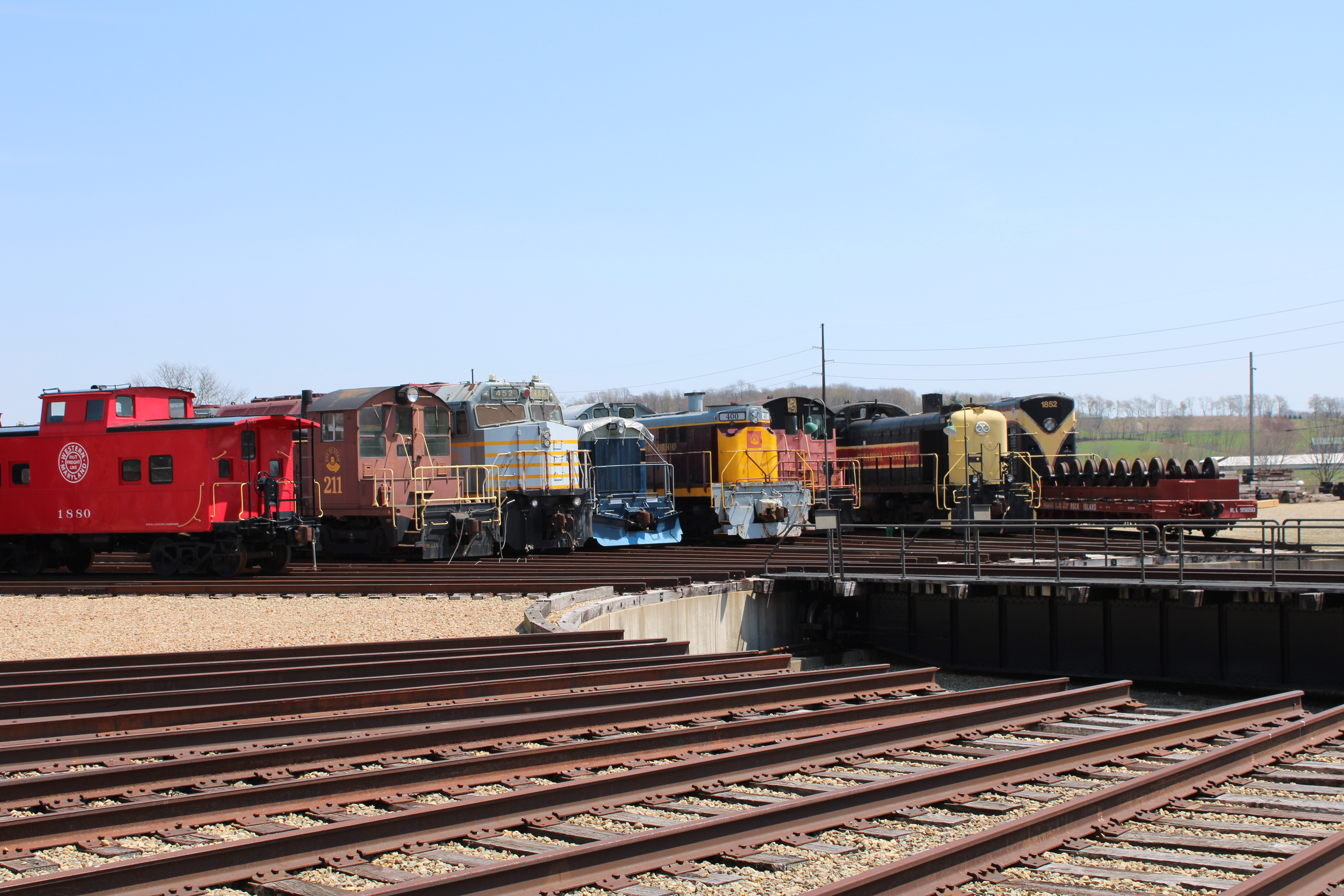
Diesel locomotives near the turntable

=== ALCO ===
Locomotive details
Number	Image	Heritage	Model	Notes
14		Newburgh & South Shore Railroad	S2	
18		South Buffalo Railway	S4	
84		Great Northern	S2	Painted in fictional Nickel Plate Road livery
100		Southern Pacific	S2	
101		Norfolk & Western	S2	
102		Norfolk & Western	S2	
400		Monongahela Connecting Railroad	T6	
1077		Long Island Rail Road	RS3	
1663		South Buffalo Railway	S2	
1782			S2	
1800		Erie Mining Co.	RS18	Named "Chappy"
4099		Delaware & Hudson	RS3	From Cuyahoga Valley Scenic Railroad
7230		Erie Mining Co.	C424	
9100		Baltimore & Ohio	S4	

EMD

Number	Heritage	Model	Notes
82	Montour Railroad	SW9	
84	Montour Railroad	SW9	
211	Detroit Edison	SW1	
212	Detroit Edison	SW1	
452	Amtrak	F40M-2C	
460	Amtrak	F40M-2C	
556	Atchison, Topeka & Santa Fe	SW1200	
736	New York Central	SW1	
1202	Aliquippa & Southern	SW1200	
1203	Wabash	SW1200	
1205	Aliquippa & Southern	SW1200	
1501	Pittsburgh & Lake Erie	GP7	

=== Fairbanks-Morse ===
Number	Heritage	Model	Notes
1802	Yankeetown Dock	H12-44	
1852	United States Army	H12-44	Painted in a Pittsburgh & West Virginia Railway inspired scheme.

=== General Electric ===
Number	Heritage	Model	Notes
4	Bethlehem Steel Johnstown Works	25-Ton	
4092	Western Pacific Railroad; Monongahela Railroad; Conrail; CSX Transportation; Ohio Central Railroad	B23-7S	Rebuilt from a Western Pacific U23B.

== See also ==
- List of heritage railroads in the United States
- Ohio Central Railroad System
- Ohio Central Railroad (1988)
