= CGR 1st Class 2-6-0ST =

South African steam locomotive

CGR 1st Class 2-6-0ST South African Class 01 2-6-0ST
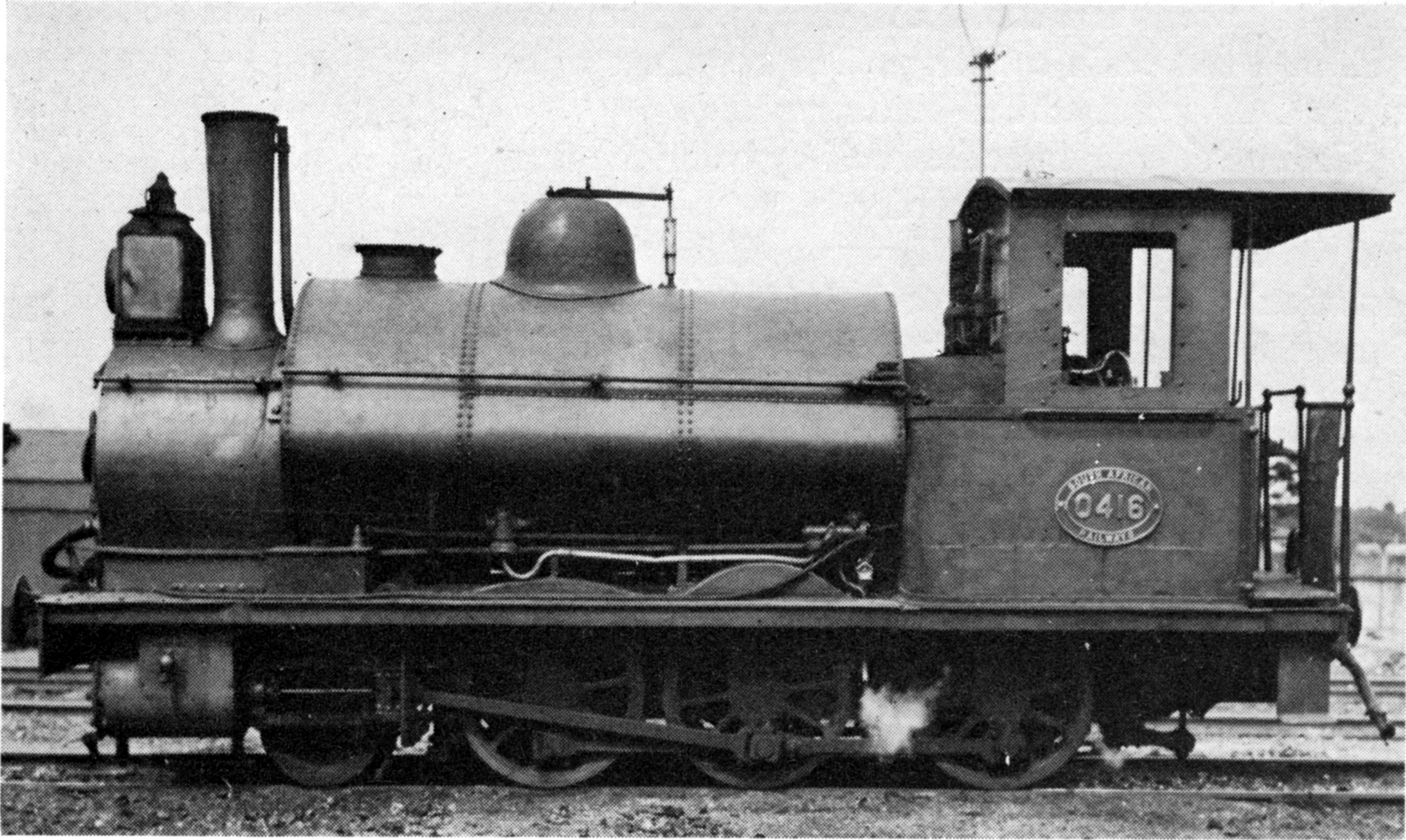
- CGR 1st Class 2-6-0ST no. M16; SAR Class 01 2-6-0ST no. 0416
Type and origin
- ♥ As a 2-6-0ST saddle-tank locomotive
- Power type: Steam
- Designer: Kitson and Company
- Builder: Kitson and Company
- Serial number: 2046-2047
- Model: 2-6-0T back-to-back
- Build date: 1876
- Total produced: One pair
- Rebuilder: Cape Government Railways
- Rebuild date: c. 1881
- Number rebuilt: 2 rebuilt from tank to saddle-tank
Specifications
- Configuration
  - Whyte: 2-6-0ST (Mogul)
  - UIC: 1Cn2t
- Driver: 2nd coupled axle
- Gauge: 3 ft 6 in (1,067 mm) Cape gauge
- Leading dia.: 24 in (610 mm)
- Coupled dia.: 39 in (991 mm)
- Wheelbase
  - Axle spacing (Asymmetrical): 1-2: 3 ft 5 in (1,041 mm); 2-3: 4 ft 1 in (1,245 mm)
  - Engine: 11 ft 3 1/2 in (3,442 mm)
  - Coupled: 7 ft 9 in (2,362 mm)
- Length
  - Over couplers: 22 ft 9 1/2 in (6,947 mm)
- Height: 11 ft 4 1/2 in (3,467 mm)
- Axle load: ♥ 7 LT 8 cwt (7,519 kg)
  - Leading: ♥ 5 LT 6 cwt (5,385 kg)
  - 1st coupled: ♥ 6 LT 16 cwt (6,909 kg)
  - 2nd coupled: ♥ 7 LT 8 cwt (7,519 kg)
  - 3rd coupled: ♥ 6 LT 3 cwt (6,249 kg)
- Adhesive weight: ♥ 20 LT 7 cwt (20,680 kg)
- Loco weight: ♥ 25 LT 13 cwt (26,060 kg)
- Fuel type: Coal
- Fuel capacity: ♥ 10 long hundredweight (0.5 t)
- Water cap.: ♥ 520 imp gal (2,360 L)
- Firebox
  - Type: Round-top
  - Grate area: 10 sq ft (0.93 m^{2})
- Boiler
  - Pitch: 5 ft 8 in (1,727 mm)
- Boiler pressure: 140 psi (965 kPa)
- Safety valve: Salter
- Heating surface
  - Firebox: 49 sq ft (4.6 m^{2})
  - Tubes: 483 sq ft (44.9 m^{2})
  - Total surface: 532 sq ft (49.4 m^{2})
- Cylinders: Two
- Cylinder size: 12 in (305 mm) bore 20 in (508 mm) stroke
- Valve gear: Stephenson
- Valve type: Slide
- Couplers: Johnston link-and-pin
Performance figures
- Tractive effort: 7,754 lbf (34.49 kN) @ 75%
Career
- Operators: Cape Government Railways; South African Railways
- Class: CGR 1st Class, SAR Class 01
- Number in class: 2
- Numbers: M15-M16, SAR 0415-0416
- Delivered: 1876
- First run: 1876
- Withdrawn: 1946

The Cape Government Railways 1st Class 2-6-0ST of 1876 was a South African steam locomotive from the pre-Union era in the Cape of Good Hope.

In 1876, the Cape Government Railways placed a pair of Stephenson's Patent back-to-back 2-6-0 Mogul type side-tank locomotives, built by Kitson, in service on the Cape Midland system. They were later separated and rebuilt to saddle-tank locomotives for use as shunting engines. When a classification system was introduced by the Railways, they were designated 1st Class.

== Manufacturer ==
A pair of Stephenson's Patent back-to-back Mogul type 2-6-0 side-tank locomotives were delivered to the Cape Government Railways (CGR) from Kitson and Company in 1876. They arrived in Port Elizabeth on the ship Queen of the West on 21 February and were numbered M15 and M16 in the Midland System's number range.

== Characteristics ==
The locomotives were built as permanently coupled back-to-back tank locomotives, a configuration which allowed the two engines to be operated by a single crew. A similar pair of 0-6-0T back-to-back locomotives, built by Robert Stephenson and Company, was delivered to the Eastern System in East London in that same year.

Their feedwater pumps, attached to the right hand side of their spectacle plates, were actuated from the piston crossheads. The locomotives were also each equipped with a small feedwater injector feed, attached to the left side of the smokebox, for use in cases of emergency or while the locomotives were stationary. The injector had been invented by the French engineer Henri Giffard in 1852.

Tyre wear was reduced by supplying jets of water, fed from 1/2 inch (13 millimetres) diameter pipes, to the leading wheels while negotiating curves. This was found to diminish friction significantly.

Their cylinders and slide valve faces were lubricated by tallow cups, attached to the sides of the cylinder assemblies. When melted tallow was later found to be unsatisfactory, it was replaced by vegetable oils.

== Service ==
=== Cape Government Railways ===
It is not known whether this back-to-back pair displayed the same instability in operation as the 0-6-0T back-to-back locomotive pair on the Eastern System, but by 1881 they had also been separated. In the process they were rebuilt to saddle-tank engines for use in shunting service in Port Elizabeth, where both spent the rest of their service lives. When a classification system was introduced on the CGR, they were designated 1st Class.

During the CGR era, both locomotives were renumbered more than once. By 1886, the system prefix "M" was replaced by the numeral "1". They were renumbered at least twice more, to 215 and 216 by 1890 and to 415 and 416 by 1896.

=== South African Railways ===
When the Union of South Africa was established on 31 May 1910, the three Colonial government railways (CGR, Natal Government Railways and Central South African Railways) were united under a single administration to control and administer the railways, ports and harbours of the Union. Although the South African Railways and Harbours came into existence in 1910, the actual classification and renumbering of all the rolling stock of the three constituent railways was only implemented with effect from 1 January 1912.

By 1912, both locomotives still survived to be taken onto the South African Railways roster. Since they were considered obsolete, the locomotives were designated Class 01 and renumbered by having the numeral 0 prefixed to their existing numbers. Even though they were considered obsolete and no. 0415 was scrapped in 1916, no. 0416 was only scrapped in 1946, after seventy years in service.

== Illustration ==
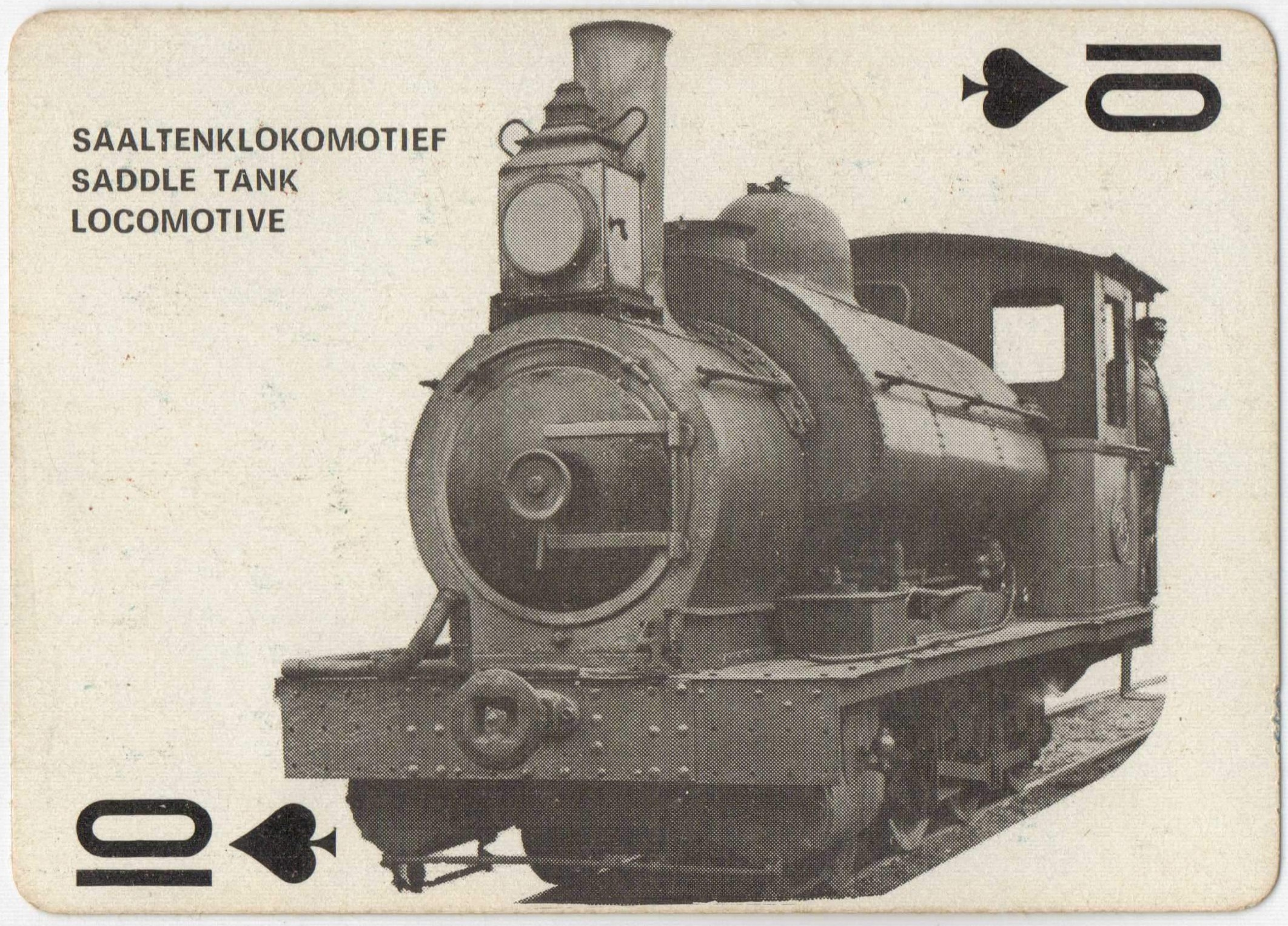
SAR Class 01 2-6-0ST no. 0416
