= List of preserved Baldwin locomotives =

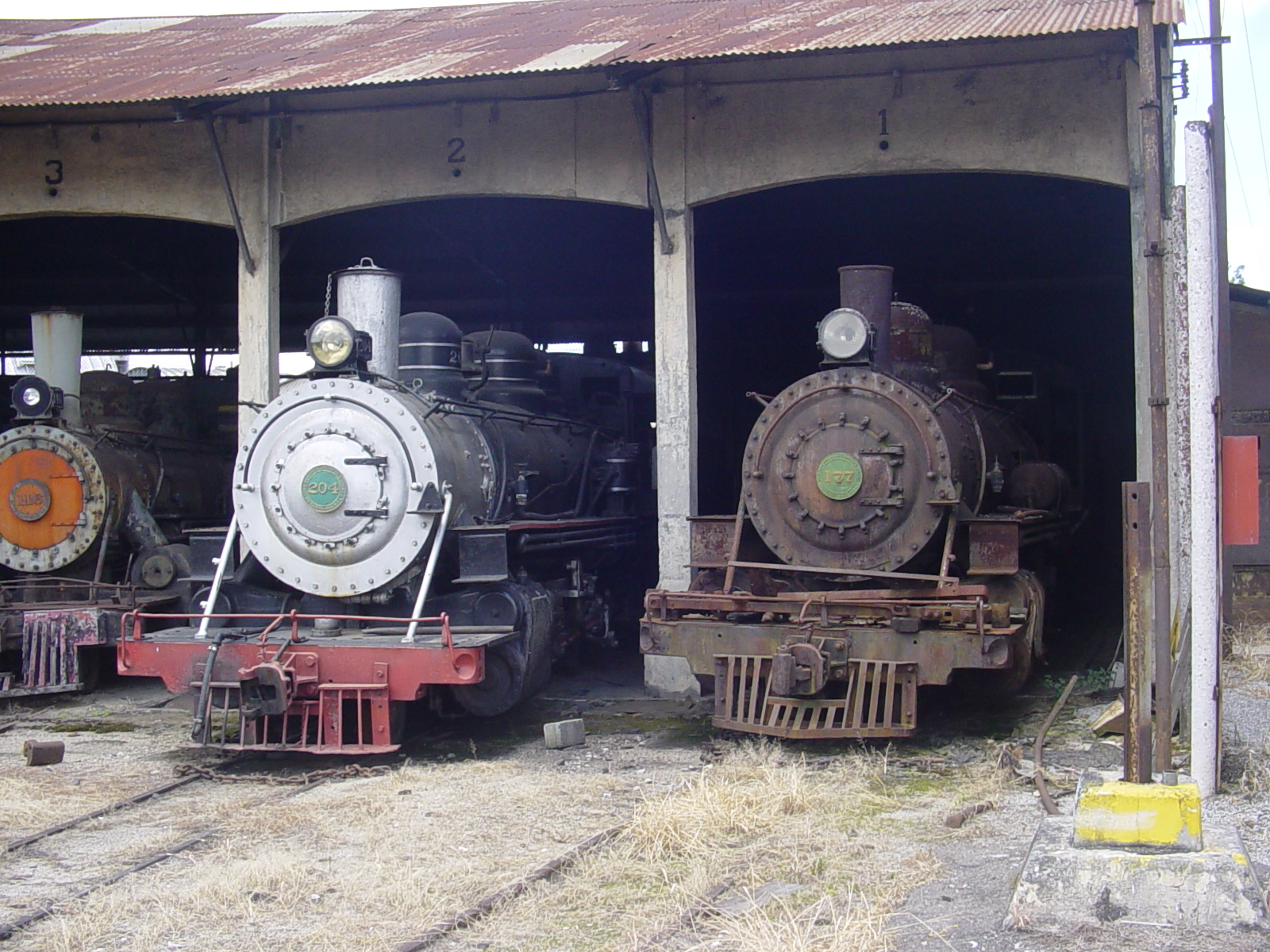
Ferrocarriles de Guatemala Nos. 116, 177 and 204 at Ferrocarriles de Guatemala at Guatemala City, Guatemala

A number of locomotives constructed by the Baldwin Locomotive Works (BLW) have been preserved in museums, on tourist railroads, and various other locations across the world. Each locomotive is listed by serial number.

== Preserved steam locomotives ==
=== 0-4-0 ===
Photograph	Works no.	Locomotive	Build date	Model	Wheel arrangement	Disposition	Location	Notes	References
	1	Philadelphia, Germantown & Norristown 'Old Ironsides'	1893	-	0-4-0	On static display	Shelburne Museum at Shelburne, Vermont	Wooden replica	
	5009	Market Street Railway of S.F. 2	1888	-	0-4-0T	Static display	Depot Mall and Museum in Fort Bragg, California	Steam dummy.	
	7372	California Redwood Co. 1	June 1884	-	0-4-0T	On static display	Collier Memorial State Park in Chiloquin, Oregon		
	17333	Atchison, Topeka and Santa Fe 5	January 1900	-	0-4-0	On static display	History Park at San Jose, California		
	21831	Reading 1187	March 1903	-	0-4-0	Awaiting cosmetic restoration	Age of Steam Roundhouse Museum in Sugarcreek, Ohio		
	33852	Indiana Northern 4	1909	-	0-4-0	Awaiting restoration	American Industrial Railroad Society at Davenport, Iowa		
	40131	Seaboard Air Line 1003	July 1913	-	0-4-0T	Stored	Old Andalusia Armoury in Andalusia, Alabama		
	42671	MINAZ 1173	1915	-	0-4-0ST+PT	On static display	Patria Sugar Mill in Morón, Ciego de Ávila, Cuba		
	54075	Humphreys Pure Oil Company 1	November 1920	-	0-4-0T	Undergoing restoration	Dunkirk, New York		
	57994	American Viscose Company 6	September 1924	-	0-4-0T	Operational	Dunkirk, New York		
	61903	Seaboard Air Line 1001	1936	-	0-4-0T	On static display	Holiday Park in Fort Lauderdale, Florida		
	61945	Indiana and Ohio Gravel 11	1936	-	0-4-0T	On static display	Indiana Railroad Museum in French Lick, Indiana		

==== Narrow gauge ====
Photograph	Works no.	Locomotive	Build date	Gauge	Model	Wheel arrangement	Disposition	Location	Notes	References
	7111	Melbourne Harbour Trust 2 'Kia Ora'	1884	3 ft 6 in	-	0-4-0T	On static display	Bassendean Railway Museum at Bassendean, Western Australia		
	14283	S.D. Warren Co. 1	April 1895	2 ft	-	0-4-0T	On static display	Boothbay Railway Village in Boothbay, Maine		
	14522	S.D. Warren Co. 2	November 1895	2 ft	-	0-4-0T	Operational	Boothbay Railway Village in Boothbay, Maine		
	17737	Salem Brick and Tile Co. 6	May 1900	2 ft 6+^{29}/_{32} in	-	0-4-0T	On static display	Gramercy, Louisiana		
	30646	Henry Cowell Lime & Cement Co. 3	April 1907	3 ft 6 in	-	0-4-0	Operational	Poway–Midland Railroad in Poway, California		

=== 0-4-2 ===
Photograph	Works no.	Locomotive	Build date	Model	Wheel arrangement	Disposition	Location	Notes	References
	6753	Waimanalo Sugar Co. 3 'Olomana'	1883	6-8 1/3C16	0-4-2ST	Display	Railroad Museum of Pennsylvania, Strasburg, Pennsylvania	Owned by the Smithsonian Institution	
	7558	Caspar, South Fork and Eastern 2	March 1885	-	0-4-2RT	Static display	Depot Mall and Museum in Fort Bragg, California		
	9442	Mammoth Cave Railway 4	1888	-	0-4-2T	Display	Mammoth Cave National Park in Kentucky	Steam dummy, included on the NRHP.	

=== 0-4-4 ===
Photograph	Works no.	Locomotive	Build date	Model	Wheel arrangement	Disposition	Location	Notes	References
	4909	Southern Railway 1509 Maud	1879	-	0-4-4T	Stored, awaiting cosmetic restoration	Southeastern Railway Museum, Duluth, Georgia		
	32792	Bock Lumber Company 1	1908	-	0-4-4T	Operational	Hoosier Valley Railroad Museum in North Judson, Indiana		

=== 0-4-4-0 ===
==== Narrow gauge ====
Photograph	Works no.	Locomotive	Build date	Gauge	Model	Wheel arrangement	Disposition	Location	Notes	References
	41893	French Army 101	1915	1 ft 11 5/8 in (600 mm)	Péchot-Bourdon locomotive	0-4-4-0T	On static display	Railway Museum in Požega, Serbia	Nicknamed Kostolac	
	43367	French Army 215	1916	1 ft 11 5/8 in (600 mm)	Péchot-Bourdon locomotive	0-4-4-0T	On static display	Frankfurter Feldbahnmuseum in Frankfurt, Germany	on loan from Dresden Transport Museum since 2019	

=== 0-6-0 ===
Photograph	Works no.	Locomotive	Build date	Model	Wheel arrangement	Disposition	Location	Notes	References
	31899	Wilmington and Western 58	October 1907	-	0-6-0	Operational	Wilmington and Western Railroad in Marshallton, Delaware		
	32894	Canadian National 7312	August 1908	-	0-6-0	Undergoing 1,472-day inspection and overhaul	Strasburg Rail Road in Strasburg, Pennsylvania		
	44886	Sturm and Dillard 105	January 1917	-	0-6-0	On static display	Age of Steam Roundhouse Museum in Sugarcreek, Ohio		
	56402	Spang, Chalfant and Co. 8	1923	-	0-6-0	On static display	Steamtown National Historic Site in Scranton, Pennsylvania		
	60733	Baldwin 26	March 1929	-	0-6-0	Operational	Steamtown National Historic Site in Scranton, Pennsylvania		

=== 0-10-0 ===
Photograph	Works no.	Locomotive	Build date	Model	Gauge	Wheel arrangement	Disposition	Location	Notes	References
	58141	Gebishi Railway 21	1924	-	1 ft 11+^{5}/_{8}in (600 mm)	0-10-0	On static display	Old Station in Bisezhai, Yunnan		
	59262	Gebishi Rail (Yunnan China) SN 23	1924	-	1 ft 11+^{5}/_{8} in (600 mm)	0-10-0	On static display	Beijing Railway Museum in Beijing, Hebei		
	59299	Gebishi Railway (Yunnan China) SN 26	1926	-	1 ft 11+^{5}/_{8}in (600 mm)	0-10-0	On static display	Shanghai Railway Museum		
	53900	Gebishi Railway 27	1926	-	1 ft 11+^{5}/_{8}in (600 mm)	0-10-0	On static display less tender	On turntable near Old Station in Bisezhai, Yunnan		
	61030	Gebishi Railway 29	1929	-	1 ft 11+^{5}/_{8}in (600 mm)	0-10-0	On static display	Yunnan Railway Museum		

=== 2-2-2 ===
Photograph	Works no.	Locomotive	Build date	Model	Wheel arrangement	Disposition	Location	Notes	References
	10174	Reading 'Black Diamond'	March 1889	-	2-2-2T	Display	National Museum of Transportation in Kirkwood, Missouri		

=== 2-4-0 ===
Photograph	Works no.	Locomotive	Build date	Model	Wheel arrangement	Disposition	Location	Notes	References
	3689	Virginia and Truckee 21 'J. W. Bowker'	January 1875	-	2-4-0	Display	Nevada State Railroad Museum in Carson City, Nevada	On loan from the California State Railroad Museum	

=== 2-4-2 ===
Photograph	Works no.	Locomotive	Build date	Model	Wheel arrangement	Disposition	Location	Notes	References
	29575	East Branch and Lincoln 5	November 1906	-	2-4-2ST	Operational	White Mountain Central Railroad in Lincoln, New Hampshire		

=== 2-4-4-2 ===
Photograph	Works no.	Locomotive	Build date	Model	Wheel arrangement	Disposition	Location	Notes	References
	33463	Columbia River Belt Line 7 "Skookum"	June 1909	-	2-4-4-2	Operational	Niles Canyon Railway in Sunol, California		

=== 2-6-0 ===
Photograph	Works no.	Locomotive	Build date	Model	Wheel arrangement	Disposition	Location	Notes	References
	3091	Virginia and Truckee 13 'Empire'	January 1873	-	2-6-0	Display	California State Railroad Museum in Sacramento, California		
	3687	Virginia and Truckee 20 'Tahoe'	January 1875	-	2-6-0	Display	Railroad Museum of Pennsylvania in Strasburg, Pennsylvania		
	7469	Dardanelle and Russellville 9	1884	-	2-6-0	Undergoing cosmetic restoration	Mid-Continent Railway Museum in North Freedom, Wisconsin		
	19671	Southern Pacific 1744	November 1901	M-63 21/28 150-S	2-6-0	Undergoing restoration to operating condition	Niles Canyon Railway in Sunol, California		
	33286	Cotton Belt 336	March 1909	-	2-6-0	Awaiting cosmetic restoration	Arkansas Railroad Museum in Pine Bluff, Arkansas		
	43278	Jonesboro, Lake City and Eastern 34	May 1916	-	2-6-0	Display	Victoria, Arkansas		
	58797	Mobile and Gulf Railroad 97	November 1925	-	2-6-0	Storage	Indiana Railway Museum in French Lick, Indiana		

==== Narrow gauge ====
Photograph	Works no.	Locomotive	Build date	Gauge	Model	Wheel arrangement	Disposition	Location	Notes	References
	3712	Carson and Tahoe Lumber and Fluming Co. 1 'Glenbrook'	March 1875	3 ft.	8-20 D	2-6-0	Operational	Nevada State Railroad Museum in Carson City, Nevada.		
	60598	Walt Disney World Railroad No. 2 "Lilly Belle"	September 1928	3 ft.	-	2-6-0	Operational	Walt Disney World Railroad at Walt Disney World's Magic Kingdom theme park in Bay Lake, Florida.		

=== 2-6-2 ===
Photograph	Works no.	Locomotive	Build date	Model	Wheel arrangement	Disposition	Location	Notes	References
	18596	McCloud River Railroad 9	1901	-	2-6-2	Awaiting cosmetic restoration	Age of Steam Roundhouse Museum in Sugarcreek, Ohio		
	19630	Santa Fe 1010	October 1901	-	2-6-2	Awaiting operational restoration	California State Railroad Museum in Sacramento, California		
	24614	MINAZ 1343	August 1904	-	2-6-2ST	On static display	Marcelo Salado Sugar Industry Museum in Caibarién, Villa Clara, Cuba		
	34270	Pacific Great Eastern 2	February 1910	-	2-6-2ST	On static display	Railway Museum of British Columbia in Squamish, British Columbia		
	38846	Nahma and Northern 5	1912	-	2-6-2	Static display	Nahma Township, Michigan		
	41649	Brooks-Scanlon Corporation 1	1914	-	2-6-2	On static display	Steamtown National Historic Site in Scranton, Pennsylvania		
	55482	Black Hills Central 103	June 1922	-	2-6-2ST	Stored, awaiting restoration	Black Hills Central Railroad in Keystone, South Dakota		
	58050	California Western 14	1924	-	2-6-2T	Display, awaiting restoration	Roots of Motive Power in Willits, California		
	58754	Sumter and Choctaw 103	November 1925	-	2-6-2	On static display, awaiting restoration	Valley Railroad in Essex, Connecticut		
	59137	Black Hills Central 104	April 1926	-	2-6-2ST	Operational	Black Hills Central Railroad in Keystone, South Dakota		

==== Narrow gauge ====
Photograph	Works no.	Locomotive	Build date	Gauge	Model	Wheel arrangement	Disposition	Location	Notes	References
	40674	CBCPP 14	1913	1 ft 11+^{5}/_{8} in	-	2-6-2PT+T	Stored	Museu das Maquinas in Anhanguera, São Paulo		
	40675	CBCPP 10	1913	1 ft 11+^{5}/_{8} in	-	2-6-2PT+T	On static display	Museu das Maquinas in Anhanguera, São Paulo		
	46828	US Army 5104	1917	1 ft 11 5/8 in (600 mm)	-	2-6-2T	Operational	"Tacot des Lacs" in France.	Nicknamed Felin Hein. Classified as a Monument historique	

=== 2-6-6-2 ===
Photograph	Works no.	Locomotive	Build date	Model	Wheel arrangement	Disposition	Location	Notes	References
	59087	Black Hills Central 108	1926	-	2-6-6-2ST	Operational	Black Hills Central Railroad in Keystone, South Dakota		
	60561	Black Hills Central 110	1928	-	2-6-6-2ST	Undergoing restoration to operational condition	Black Hills Central Railroad in Keystone, South Dakota		
	62064	California Western 46	June 1937	-	2-6-6-2	Display, awaiting restoration	Pacific Southwest Railway Museum in Campo, California		
	74277	Chesapeake and Ohio 1308	1949	-	2-6-6-2	On static display	Huntington, West Virginia, awaiting movement to the Age of Steam Roundhouse in Sugarcreek, Ohio		
	74278	Western Maryland Scenic 1309	November 1949	-	2-6-6-2	Operational	Western Maryland Scenic Railroad in Cumberland, Maryland		

=== 2-8-0 ===
Photograph	Works no.	Locomotive	Build date	Model	Wheel arrangement	Disposition	Location	Notes	References
	23890	Southern Pacific 2718	March 1904	-	2-8-0	On static display	Rachael Dorris Park, near the Modoc County Historical Museum in Alturas, California		
	32487	Southern Railway 401	December 1907	-	2-8-0	Operational	Monticello Railway Museum in Monticello, Illinois		
	54266	Alberta Prairie Railway 41	1920	-	2-8-0	Operational	Alberta Prairie Railway Excursions in Stettler, Alberta, Canada		
	33370	Bessemer and Lake Erie 154	April 1909	-	2-8-0	On static display	Henry Ford Museum in Dearborn, Michigan		
	35723	Nacionale de Mexico 903	December 1910	-	2-8-0	On static display	Museo Jose Cardoso Tellez inAcámbaro, Guanajuato		
	35938	Arizona Lumber and Timber 25	January 1911	10-30 E (#123)	2-8-0	Static display	Flagstaff, Arizona		
	43105	Western Maryland Scenic 734	April 1916	10-43-E (#93)	2-8-0	Stored, awaiting restoration	Western Maryland Scenic Railroad in Cumberland, Maryland		
	43108	Lake Superior and Ishpeming 33	February 1916	-	2-8-0	Stored, awaiting 1,472-day inspection and overhaul	Age of Steam Roundhouse Museum in Sugarcreek, Ohio		
	43529	Rahway Valley 15	June 1916	10-34 E	2-8-0	On static display	Steamtown National Historic Site in Scranton, Pennsylvania		
	47032	Southern Pine Lumber Co. 28	November 1917	-	2-8-0	Undergoing 1,472-day inspection and overhaul	Texas State Railroad in Rusk, Texas		
	52292	Louisiana and Arkansas 99	September 1919	-	2-8-0	Display	Illinois Railway Museum in Union, Illinois		
	55644	Tennessee, Alabama and Georgia 101	1922	-	2-8-0	Static display	Cotton Belt Depot in Fordyce, Arkansas		
	57707	Chattahoochee Valley Railroad 21	April 1924	-	2-8-0	On static display	Southeastern Railway Museum in Duluth, Georgia		
	58489	Washington & Lincolnton 203	June 1925	-	2-8-0	Undergoing 1,472-day inspection and overhaul	Three Rivers Rambler in Knoxville, Tennessee		
	58824	New Hope Railroad 40	December 1925	10-34-E	2-8-0	Operational	New Hope Railroad in New Hope, Pennsylvania		
	59946	Huntingdon and Broad Top 38/Baldwin 38	April 1927	-	2-8-0	Stored	Everett Railroad in Hollidaysburg, Pennsylvania		
	64641	Great Smoky Mountains Railroad 1702	September 1942	S160	2-8-0	Operational	Great Smoky Mountains Railroad in Bryson City, North Carolina		
	69496	US Army 2253	1942	S160	2-8-0	Operational	Dartmouth Steam Railway		
	69855	Alaska Railroad 556	1943	S160	2-8-0	On static display	City of Anchorage		
	69856	US Army 611	1943	S160	2-8-0	Stored	Eckhart Mines, Maryland		
	69857	US Army 2630	November 1943	S160	2-8-0	Undergoing cosmetic restoration	Age of Steam Roundhouse Museum in Sugarcreek, Ohio		
	70340	US Army 3278	1944	S160	2-8-0	Undergoing restoration to operating condition	Churnet Valley Railway		
	70377	SEK Θγ584	1944	S160	2-8-0	Stored	Thessaloniki Old Depot		
	70480	Alaska Railroad 557	1944	S160	2-8-0	Undergoing restoration to operating condition	Wasilla, Alaska		
	70481	SEK Θγ532	1944	S160	2-8-0	Stored	Thessaloniki Old Depot		
	70497	MAV 411.118	1945	S160	2-8-0	Operational	Hungarian Railway Museum, Budapest		
	72080	US Army 6046	1945	S160	2-8-0	Operational	Churnet Valley Railway		
	72090	MAV 411.358	1945	S160	2-8-0	On static display	Hegyeshalom railway station in Hegyeshalom, Győr-Moson-Sopron County, Hungary		
	75503	Tennessee Valley Railroad 610	March 1952	S160	2-8-0	Awaiting restoration	Tennessee Valley Railroad Museum in Chattanooga, Tennessee		

==== Narrow gauge ====
Photograph	Works no.	Locomotive	Build date	Gauge	Model	Wheel arrangement	Disposition	Location	Notes	References
	32962	White Pass & Yukon Route 69	June 1908	3 ft	10-36E	2-8-0	Undergoing 1,472-day inspection and overhaul	White Pass and Yukon Route, Skagway, Alaska		

=== 2-8-2 ===
Photograph	Works no.	Locomotive	Build date	Model	Wheel arrangement	Disposition	Location	Notes	References
	37085	Southern Railway 4501	October 1911	12-48 ¼ E	2-8-2	Operational	Tennessee Valley Railroad Museum in Chattanooga, Tennessee		
	38967	Polson Logging Company 2	December 1912	-	2-8-2	Operational	Oregon Coast Scenic Railroad, Oregon Rail Heritage Center		
	39665	Duluth and Northern Minnesota 14	April 1913	-	2-8-2	On static display	Lake Superior Railroad Museum in Duluth, Minnesota		
	42000	McCloud River 19	April 1915	-	2-8-2	Operational	Age of Steam Roundhouse Museum in Sugarcreek, Ohio		
	42152	Texas and Pacific 400	June 1915	-	2-8-2	Display	Texas and Pacific Railway Depot & Museum in Marshall, Texas		
	44565	Pennsylvania Railroad 520	December 1916	-	2-8-2	On static display	Railroad Museum of Pennsylvania in Strasburg, Pennsylvania.		
	49153	Baltimore and Ohio 4500	July 4, 1918	-	2-8-2	On static display	B&O Railroad Museum in Baltimore, Maryland		
	49683	Nickel Plate Road 587	September 1918	-	2-8-2	Stored, awaiting restoration	Kentucky Rail Heritage Center, Ravenna, Kentucky		
	53182	Kentucky and Tennessee 10	May 1920	-	2-8-2	Awaiting cosmetic restoration	Tennessee Valley Railroad Museum in Chattanooga, Tennessee		
	56812	Chicago, Burlington and Quincy 4963	August 1923	-	2-8-2	On static display	Illinois Railway Museum, in Union, Illinois		
	57778	Sumter & Choctaw 102	June 1924	12-32 ¼ E	2-8-2	Operational	National Railroad Museum in Green Bay, Wisconsin		
	58045	California Western 45	October 1924	12-32 ¼ E	2-8-2	Under overhaul	California Western Railroad in Fort Bragg, California		
	59071	Polson Logging 90	1926	-	2-8-2	On static display	Oregon Coast Scenic Railroad in Garibaldi, Oregon		
	64513	TCDD 46217	1942	-	2-8-2	On static display	Malatya, Eastern Anatolia, Turkey		
	64524	TCDD 46239	1942	-	2-8-2	Stored	Diyarbakır, Turkey		
	72381	SNCF 141 R 568	1945	SNCF Class 141R	2-8-2	Operational	Swiss Classic Train in Vallorbe, Switzerland	Coal fired	
	72961	SNCF 141 R 840	1946	SNCF Class 141R	2-8-2	Operational	Amicale des Anciens et Amis de la Traction à Vapeur, section Centre/Val de Loire in Fleury-les-Aubrais, France	Oil fired. Classified as a Monument historique	
	73008	SNCF 141 R 1187	1946	SNCF Class 141R	2-8-2	On static display	Cité du Train in Mulhouse, France	Oil fired. Carry builder's plate number 72272, from locomotive 141 R 459.	
	73048	SNCF 141 R 1199	1947	SNCF Class 141R	2-8-2	Awaiting overhaul	Amicale des Anciens et Amis de la Traction à Vapeur, section Centre/Val de Loire in Fleury-les-Aubrais, France	Oil fired. Classified as a Monument historique	

==== Narrow gauge ====
Photograph	Works no.	Locomotive	Build date	Gauge	Model	Wheel arrangement	Disposition	Location	Notes	References
	37325	East Broad Top Railroad 12 "Millie"	December 1911	3 ft	12-28 ¼ E	2-8-2	Stored, awaiting restoration	East Broad Top Railroad in Rockhill Furnace, Pennsylvania		
	38625	East Broad Top Railroad 14	1912	3 ft	12-32 ¼ E	2-8-2	Stored, awaiting restoration	East Broad Top Railroad in Rockhill Furnace, Pennsylvania		
	41196	East Broad Top Railroad 15	1914	3 ft	12-32 ¼ E	2-8-2	Undergoing restoration	East Broad Top Railroad in Rockhill Furnace, Pennsylvania		
	43562	East Broad Top Railroad 16 "Nick"	1916	3 ft	12-34 ¼ E	2-8-2	Operational	East Broad Top Railroad in Rockhill Furnace, Pennsylvania		
	48075	East Broad Top Railroad 17	1918	3 ft	12-34 ¼ E	2-8-2	Stored, awaiting restoration	East Broad Top Railroad in Rockhill Furnace, Pennsylvania		
	53541	East Broad Top Railroad 18	1920	3 ft	12-34 ¼ E	2-8-2	Stored, awaiting restoration	East Broad Top Railroad in Rockhill Furnace, Pennsylvania		
	62234	White Pass & Yukon Route 70	May 1938	3 ft	12-28 ¼ E	2-8-2	Operational	Dollywood Express, Pigeon Forge, Tennessee, United States		
	62257	White Pass & Yukon Route 71	January 1939	3 ft	12-28 ¼ E	2-8-2	Stored, awaiting restoration	Dollywood Express, Pigeon Forge, Tennessee, United States		
	69425	Tweetsie Railroad 190	1943	3 ft	USATC S118 Class	2-8-2	Operational	Tweetsie Railroad, Blowing Rock, North Carolina, United States		
	69427	Dollywood Express 192	1943	3 ft	USATC S118 Class	2-8-2	Operational	Dollywood Express, Pigeon Forge, Tennessee, United States		
	69430	White Pass and Yukon 195	February 1943	3 ft	USATC S118 Class	2-8-2	On static display	Skagway, Alaska, United States		
	69453	Queensland Rail 218A	1943	3 ft 6 in	Queensland AC16 class	2-8-2	Operational	Zig Zag Railway Lithgow, New South Wales, Australia		
	69456	Queensland Rail 221A	1943	3 ft 6 in	Queensland AC16 class	2-8-2	Operational	Workshops Rail Museum, Ipswich, Queensland, Australia		
	72656	Ferrocarriles de Guatemala 177	1946	3 ft	-	2-8-2	Stored	Ferrocarriles de Guatemala at Guatemala City, Guatemala		
	73352	White Pass & Yukon Route 73	May 1947	3 ft	12-28 ¼ E	2-8-2	Operational	White Pass and Yukon Route, Skagway, Alaska		
	74011	MAWD 1798	1943	3 ft 3+^{3}/_{8} in	-	2-8-2	Operational	New Jalpaiguri, India		
	74134	Ferrocarriles de Guatemala 204	1948	3 ft	-	2-8-2	Stored	Museo del Ferrocarril at Guatemala City, Guatemala		

=== 2-8-8-4 ===
Photograph	Works no.	Locomotive	Build date	Model	Wheel arrangement	Disposition	Location	Notes	References
	62531	Duluth, Missabe & Iron Range 225	1941	-	2-8-8-4	On static display	Proctor, Minnesota		
	62533	Duluth, Missabe & Iron Range 227	1941	-	2-8-8-4	On static display	Lake Superior Railroad Museum in Duluth, Minnesota		
	64708	Duluth, Missabe & Iron Range 229	1943	-	2-8-8-4	On static display	Two Harbors, Minnesota		

=== 2-10-0 ===
Photograph	Works no.	Locomotive	Build date	Model	Wheel arrangement	Disposition	Location	Notes	References
	17914	Soo Line 950	1900	-	2-10-0	On static display	City of Ashland, Wisconsin		
	57812	Great Western 90	June 1924	12-42-F	2-10-0	Operational	Strasburg Rail Road in Strasburg, Pennsylvania		
	60341	Alabama, Tennessee and Northern Railroad 401	January 1928	12-42-F	2-10-0	On static display	Age of Steam Roundhouse Museum in Sugarcreek, Ohio		
	60342	Gainesville Midland 203	January 1928	12-42-F	2-10-0	On static display	Southeastern Railway Museum in Duluth, Georgia		
	61230	Gainesville Midland 208	March 1930	12-42-F	2-10-0	On static display			
	61233	Gainesville Midland 209	March 1930	12-42-F	2-10-0	On static display			

==== Narrow gauge ====
Photograph	Works no.	Locomotive	Build date	Model	Gauge	Wheel arrangement	Disposition	Location	Notes	References
	58141	Gebishi Railway 21	1924	-	1 ft 11+^{5}/_{8} in	2-10-0	On static display	Old Station at Bisezhai, Yunnan, China		

==== Broad gauge ====
Photograph	Works no.	Locomotive	Build date	Model	Gauge	Wheel arrangement	Disposition	Location	Notes	References
	-	Sovetskie Zheleznye Dorogi YeA-3220	-	-	5 ft	2-10-0	On static display	Aksyonovo-Zilovskoye, Zabaykalsky Krai, Russia		
	71650	Sovetskie Zheleznye Dorogi YeA-3751	1945	-	5 ft	2-10-0	Stored	Arkhara, Amur, Russia		
	73850	Sovetskie Zheleznye Dorogi YeM-3947	1946	-	5 ft	2-10-0	Stored	Strategic Reserve at Arkhara, Amur, Russia		

=== 2-10-2 ===
Photograph	Works no.	Locomotive	Build date	Model	Wheel arrangement	Disposition	Location	Notes	References
	56999	Union Pacific 5511	September 1923	-	2-10-2	Under restoration	Railroading Heritage of Midwest America in Silvis, Illinois		

=== 2-10-4 ===
Photograph	Works no.	Locomotive	Build date	Model	Wheel arrangement	Disposition	Location	Notes	References
	61524	Atchison, Topeka and Santa Fe 5000	October 1930	-	2-10-4	On static display	Railroad Artifact Preservation Society at Amarillo, Texas		
	70817	Santa Fe 5011	1944	-	2-10-4	On static display	National Museum of Transportation in Kirkwood, Missouri		
	70823	Atchison, Topeka and Santa Fe 5017	1944	-	2-10-4	On static display	National Railroad Museum in Green Bay, Wisconsin		
	70827	Santa Fe 5021	1944	-	2-10-4	On static display	California State Railroad Museum in Sacramento, California		
	70836	Santa Fe 5030	1944	-	2-10-4	On static display	Salvador Perez Park in Santa Fe, New Mexico		
	70057	Bessemer and Lake Erie 643	1944	-	2-10-4	Stored	Age of Steam Roundhouse Museum in Sugarcreek, Ohio		

==== Narrow gauge ====
Photograph	Works no.	Locomotive	Build date	Model	Gauge	Wheel arrangement	Disposition	Location	Notes	References
	62355	Estrada de Ferro Doña Teresa Cristina 300-2M	1940	-	3 ft 3+^{3}/_{8} in	2-10-4	Stored	A railway yard at Tubarão, Santa Catarina, Brazil		
	62362	Estrada de Ferro Doña Teresa Cristina 307	1940	-	3 ft 3+^{3}/_{8} in	2-10-4	On static display	Museu Ferroviario at Tubarão, Santa Catarina, Brazil	Displayed as Estrada de Ferro Doña Teresa Cristina 300	

=== 4-4-0 ===
Photograph	Works no.	Locomotive	Build date	Model	Wheel arrangement	Disposition	Location	Notes	References
	2816	Virginia and Truckee 11 'Reno'	May 1872	-	4-4-0	Under restoration	Virginia and Truckee Railroad in Virginia City, Nevada		
	3090	Virginia and Truckee 12 'Genoa'	January 1873	-	4-4-0	Display	Nevada State Railroad Museum in Carson City, Nevada	On loan from the California State Railroad Museum	
	3693	Virginia and Truckee 22 'Inyo'	February 1875	-	4-4-0	Operational	Nevada State Railroad Museum in Carson City, Nevada		
	52207	Red River and Gulf 104	August 1919	-	4-4-0	On static display	Southeastern Railway Museum in Duluth, Georgia		

==== Narrow gauge ====
Photograph	Works no.	Locomotive	Build date	Model	Gauge	Wheel arrangement	Disposition	Location	Notes	References
	3763	Eureka and Palisade 4 'Eureka'	July 1875	8-18C	3 ft.	4-4-0	Operational	Las Vegas, Nevada		

=== 4-6-0 ===
Photograph	Works no.	Locomotive	Build date	Model	Wheel arrangement	Disposition	Location	Notes	References
	25016	Virginia and Truckee 25	1905	-	4-6-0	Operational	Nevada State Railroad Museum in Carson City, Nevada		
	27048	Clinchfield 99	December 1905	-	4-6-0	Display	Casey Jones Home and Railroad Museum in Jackson, Tennessee	Displayed as Illinois Central 382.	
	38221	Southern Pacific 2353	August 1912	-	4-6-0	On static display	Pacific Southwest Railway Museum in Campo, California		
	38223	Southern Pacific 2355	August 1912	-	4-6-0	On static display	Pioneer Park in Mesa, Arizona		
	39453	Vriginia and Truckee 27	March 1913	-	4-6-0	Display	Comstock History Center in Virginia City, Nevada		
	39553	Louisiana and Arkansas 509	March 1913	-	4-6-0	Display	Cookeville Depot Museum in Cookeville, Tennessee	Displayed as Tennessee Central 509	
	43334	Mississippi Eastern 303	April 1916	10-32-D	4-6-0	Awaiting cosmetic restoration	Monticello Railway Museum in Monticello, Illinois		
	44799	MINAZ 1591	1917	10-32-D	4-6-0	On static display			
	52376	MINAZ 1671	1919	10-32-D	4-6-0	Operational			
	53106	Louisiana and Arkansas 503	April 1920	-	4-6-0	Display	Bryant Park in Port Arthur, Texas	Displayed as Kansas City Southern 503	
	57203	Red River and Gulf 106	September 1923	10-32-D	4-6-0	Awaiting cosmetic restoration	Southern Forest Heritage Museum in Long Leaf, Louisiana		
	59751	Hampton and Branchville 44	1927	10-32-D	4-6-0	On static display	South Carolina Railroad Museum in Winnsboro, South Carolina		

==== Narrow gauge ====
Photograph	Works no.	Locomotive	Build date	Model	Gauge	Wheel arrangement	Disposition	Location	Notes	References
	32694	CBCPP 16	1911	-	1 ft 11+^{5}/_{8} in	4-6-0	Stored	Fabrica de Cimento Portland at Perus, São Paulo		
	44656	War Department Light Railways 778	1917	10-12-D	-	4-6-0PT	Operational	Leighton Buzzard Light Railway in Leighton Buzzard in Bedfordshire, England		
	44657	War Department Light Railways 779	1917	10-12-D	-	4-6-0PT	On static display	Statfold Barn Railway in Warwickshire, England		
	44699	Baldwin 794	1917	10-12-D	-	4-6-0PT	Operational	Welsh Highland Heritage Railway in Gwynedd, Wales		
	45069	East Tennessee & Western North Carolina Railroad 12	1917	10-26-D	-	4-6-0	Operational	Tweetsie Railroad, Blowing Rock, North Carolina, United States		
	45190	Baldwin 608	1917	10-12-D	-	4-6-0PT	Operational	Ffestiniog Railway in Gwynedd, Wales.		
	45215		1917	10-12-D	-	4-6-0	On static display	Dreamworld theme park on the Gold Coast, Queensland in Australia.		
	58444	Walt Disney World Railroad No. 1 Walter E. Disney	1925	10-D	-	4-6-0	Operational	Walt Disney World Railroad at Walt Disney World's Magic Kingdom theme park in Bay Lake, Florida.		
	58445	Walt Disney World Railroad No. 3 Roger E. Broggie	1925	10-D	-	4-6-0	Operational	Walt Disney World Railroad at Walt Disney World's Magic Kingdom theme park in Bay Lake, Florida.		

=== 4-6-2 ===
Photograph	Works no.	Locomotive	Build date	Model	Wheel arrangement	Disposition	Location	Notes	References
	37303	Little River Railroad 110	November 1911	-	4-6-2	Operational	Little River Railroad in Quincy, Michigan		
	37332	Santa Fe 1316	December 1911	-	4-6-2	On static display, awaiting restoration	Fort Concho Museum in San Angelo, Texas		
	38076	Western Maryland 202	July 1912	-	4-6-2	On static display	City Park, in Hagerstown, Maryland		
	51861	Santa Fe 3415	June 1919	-	4-6-2	Undergoing a 15-year expiration overhaul	Abilene and Smoky Valley Railroad yard in Abilene, Kansas		
	54401	Canadian National 593	January 1921	-	4-6-2	on static display	Corner Brook Newfoundland		
	54472	Southern Pacific 2467	January 1921	-	4-6-2	On static display	Central Pacific Railroad Passenger Station in Sacramento, California		
	54477	Southern Pacific 2472	March 1921	-	4-6-2	Undergoing 1,472-day inspection and overhaul	Golden Gate Railroad Museum at Schellville, California		
	57228	Southern Pacific 2479	October 1923	-	4-6-2	Undergoing 1,472-day inspection and overhaul	Niles Canyon Railway in Fremont, California		
	60339	Reading Blue Mountain and Northern 425	January 1928	-	4-6-2	Undergoing 1,472-day inspection and overhaul	Reading, Blue Mountain and Northern Railroad in Port Clinton, Pennsylvania		
	61073	Grand Trunk Western 5632	November 1929	-	4-6-2	On static display	City of Durand, Michigan		

=== 4-6-4 ===
Photograph	Works no.	Locomotive	Build date	Model	Wheel arrangement	Disposition	Location	Notes	References
	61500	Chicago, Burlington and Quincy 4000 Aeolus	October 1930	-	4-6-4	On static display	Copeland Park at La Crosse, Wisconsin		
	62086	Santa Fe 3463	October 30, 1937	-	4-6-4	On static display	Topeka, Kansas		

=== 4-8-0 ===
Photograph	Works no.	Locomotive	Build date	Model	Wheel arrangement	Disposition	Location	Notes	References
	28343	Norfolk and Western 475	June 1906	-	4-8-0	Operational	Strasburg Rail Road in Strasburg, Pennsylvania		
	35232	Norfolk and Western 1118	September 1910	-	4-8-0	Awaiting cosmetic restoration	National Railway Historical Society's Roanoke Chapter		
	35340	Norfolk and Western 1134	October 1910	-	4-8-0	On static display	Railroad Museum of Virginia in Portsmouth, Virginia.		

=== 4-8-2 ===
Photograph	Works no.	Locomotive	Build date	Model	Wheel arrangement	Disposition	Location	Notes	References
	57184	Great Northern 2507	October 1923	14-52 ¼ E (#8)	4-8-2	On static display	Wishram depot in Wishram, Washington	GN P-2 class	
	57343	Great Northern 2523	October 1923	14-52 ¼ E (#24)	4-8-2	On static display	Kandiyohi County Historical Society, in Willmar, Minnesota	GN P-2 class	
	58463	Grand Trunk Western 6039	June 26, 1925	14-46 ¼ E (#3)	4-8-2	On static display	Steamtown National Historic Site in Scranton, Pennsylvania	CN/GTW U-1-c class	
	59134	St. Louis–San Francisco 1522	May 1926	14-50 ¼ E (#88)	4-8-2	On static display	National Museum of Transportation in St. Louis, Missouri	SLSF 1500-class	
	59200	St. Louis–San Francisco 1526	May 1926	14-50 ¼ E	4-8-2	On static display	Museum of the Great Plains in Lawton, Oklahoma.	SLSF 1500-class	

=== 4-8-8-2 ===
Photograph	Works no.	Locomotive	Build date	Model	Wheel arrangement	Disposition	Location	Notes	References
	70101	Southern Pacific 4294	March 1944	4-8-8-2 24S	4-8-8-2	On static display	California State Railroad Museum in Sacramento, California	SP AC-12	

=== 4-8-4 ===
Photograph	Works no.	Locomotive	Build date	Model	Wheel arrangement	Disposition	Location	Notes	References
	57596	Reading 2124	December 1924 (As Class I10sa 2-8-0 Consolidation #2024) January 1947 (Rebuilt as : T1 4-8-4 Northern #2124)	-	4-8-4	On static display	Steamtown National Historic Site in Scranton, Pennsylvania		
	58278	Reading 2101	March 1923 (As Class I10sa 2-8-0 Consolidation #2037) September 1945 (Rebuilt as : T1 4-8-4 Northern #2101)	-	4-8-4	Undergoing cosmetic restoration	B&O Railroad Museum in Baltimore, Maryland		
	58329	Reading 2102	March 1925 (As Class I10sa 2-8-0 Consolidation #2044) September 1945 (Rebuilt as : T1 4-8-4 Northern #2102)	-	4-8-4	Operational	Reading, Blue Mountain and Northern Railroad in Port Clinton, Pennsylvania		
	58330	Reading 2100	May 1923 (As Class I10sa 2-8-0 Consolidation #2045) September 1945 (Rebuilt as : T1 4-8-4 Northern #2100)	-	4-8-4	Undergoing operational restoration	West 3rd street roundhouse in Cleveland, Ohio		
	60004	Santa Fe 3751	May 1927	16-54 ¼ E (#1)	4-8-4	Operational	San Bernardino Railroad Historical Society in San Bernardino, California		
	60385	Santa Fe 3759	February 1928	16-54 ¼ E (#9)	4-8-4	On static display	Kingman, Arizona		
	61238	Great Northern 2584	March 1930	Baldwin 16-52 2/4 E, (#10)	4-8-4	On static display	Havre depot in Havre, Montana		
	62122	Santa Fe 3768	April 1938	4-8-2 28 S	4-8-4	On static display	Great Plains Transportation Museum in Wichita, Kansas		
	64449	St. Louis–San Francisco 4500	November 1942	4-8-4 28 S	4-8-4	On static display	Route 66 Historical Village in Tulsa, Oklahoma		
	64450	St. Louis–San Francisco 4501	November 1942	4-8-4 28 S	4-8-4	On static display	Museum of the American Railroad in Frisco, Texas		
	69732	St. Louis–San Francisco 4516	August 1943	4-8-4 28 S	4-8-4	On static display	Missouri State Fairgrounds in Sedalia, Missouri		
	69740	St. Louis–San Francisco 4524	September 1943	4-8-4 28 S	4-8-4	On static display	Grant Beach Park in Springfield, Missouri		
	69791	Santa Fe 2903	November 1943	4-8-4 28 S	4-8-4	Display	Illinois Railway Museum in Union, Illinois		
	69800	Santa Fe 2912	November 1943	4-8-4 28 S	4-8-4	Display	Pueblo Railway Museum in Pueblo, Colorado		
	69801	Santa Fe 2913	November 1943	4-8-4 28 S	4-8-4	Display	Riverside Park in Fort Madison, Iowa		
	69809	Santa Fe 2921	1944	4-8-4 28 S	4-8-4	Display	Modesto station in Modesto, California		
	69813	Santa Fe 2925	1944	4-8-4 28 S	4-8-4	Display	California State Railroad Museum in Sacramento, California		
	69814	Santa Fe 2926	May 1944	4-8-4 28 S	4-8-4	Operational	New Mexico Heritage Rail in Albuquerque, New Mexico		

=== 4-10-2 ===
Photograph	Works no.	Locomotive	Build date	Model	Disposition	Location	Notes	References
	60000	Baldwin 60000	1926	16-3-48/48-1/4-F	On static display	Franklin Institute Science Museum in Philadelphia, Pennsylvania		

== Preserved diesel locomotives ==
=== Two-axle ===
Photograph	Works no.	Locomotive	Build date	Model	Disposition	Location	Notes	References
	47821		1917	50HP	Stored	Association for the preservation and maintenance of narrow gauge equipment in Saint-Germain-d'Arcé, France	Equipped with original Pittsburgh gasoline engine	
	48098	U.S. Army 4007	March 1918	B116	Stored	Carreau Wendel Museum in Petite-Rosselle, France	Gasoline engine replaced by a Perkins diesel engine	

==== Narrow gauge ====
Photograph	Works no.	Locomotive	Build date	Gauge	Model	Disposition	Location	Notes	References
	47618	US Army 7108	1917	1 ft 11 5/8 in (600 mm)	50 HP	Awaiting restoration	Tacots des Lacs in Grez-sur-Loing, France		
	48378		1918	1 ft 11 5/8 in (600 mm)	50 HP	Under restoration	Moseley Railway Trust in Staffordshire, England		
	48606	US Army 7001	1918	1 ft 11 5/8 in (600 mm)	50 HP	Operationnal	Tacots des Lacs in Grez-sur-Loing, France	Gasoline engine replaced with a Saurer diesel engine	
	48630	US Army 7118	1918	1 ft 11 5/8 in (600 mm)	50 HP	Operationnal	Tacots des Lacs in Grez-sur-Loing, France	Gasoline engine replaced with a CLM diesel engine. Classified as a Monument historique	
	49192		1918	1 ft 11 5/8 in (600 mm)	50 HP	On static display	Froissy Dompierre Light Railway in France	Carry builder's plates number 48606	
	49581	1468	1918	1 ft 11 5/8 in (600 mm)	50 HP	Operationnal	Frankfurter Feldbahnmuseum in Frankfurt, Germany		

=== Four-axle ===
Photograph	Works no.	Locomotive	Build date	Model	Disposition	Location	Notes	References
	64258	Frisco 200	November 1941	VO-1000m	Under restoration	Tennessee Valley Railroad Museum in Chattanooga, Tennessee	Rebuilt by EMD in 1957	
	67729	Santa Fe 1460	July 1943	SWBLW	On static display	Western America Railroad Museum in Barstow, California	Rebuilt by the Santa Fe in 1970	
	73359	Chesapeake Western 662	December 1946	DS-4-4-660	On static display	Virginia Museum of Transportation in Roanoke, Virginia		
	73360	Chesapeake Western 663	December 1946	DS-4-4-660	Awaiting restoration	Roanoke Chapter NRHS in Roanoke, Virginia		
	74193	California Western 53	August 1949	DS-4-4-1000	On static display	Roots of Motive Power in Willits, California		
	75316	Delaware and Hudson 1205 and 1216	December 1951	RF-16	Stored	Escanaba and Lake Superior Railroad at Wells, Michigan		
	75372	Delaware and Hudson 1205 and 1216	January 1952	RF-16	Stored	Escanaba and Lake Superior Railroad at Wells, Michigan		
	75707	US Navy 65-00367	November 1952	S-12	Operational	Naval Weapons Station Earle in Monmouth County, New Jersey		
	75708	US Navy 65-00368	November 1952	S-12	Operational	Naval Weapons Station Earle in Monmouth County, New Jersey		
	75709	Baldwin 1200	November 1952	S-12	On static display	Railroad Museum of Pennsylvania in Strasburg, Pennsylvania.		
	76105	California Western 56	April 1955	RS-12	On static display	Travel Town Museum at Los Angeles, California		

=== Six-axle ===
Photograph	Works no.	Locomotive	Build date	Model	Wheel arrangement	Disposition	Location	Notes	References
	72624	Columbus and Greenville 601	October 1946	DRS-6-4-1500	C-C	On static display	Columbus, Mississippi		
	72926	SNCF A1AA1A 62029	December 1946	DRS-6-4-660NA	A1A-A1A	Operational	Chemin de Fer Touristique du Rhin in Volgelsheim, France		
	73147	SNCF A1AA1A 62032	January 1947	DRS-6-4-660NA	A1A-A1A	Stored	Thouars, France	Broken engine	
	73188	SNCF A1AA1A 62073	July 1947	DRS-6-4-660NA	A1A-A1A	Awaiting restoration	Chemin de Fer Touristique du Rhin in Volgelsheim, France	Registered as a Monument historique	
	73209	SNCF A1AA1A 62094	September 1947	DRS-6-4-660NA	A1A-A1A	Operationnal	Centre de la Mine et du Chemin de Fer in Oignies, France		
	73262	Southern Pacific 5208	May 1949	DRS-6-6-1500	C-C	On static display	California State Railroad Museum at Sacramento, California		
	74138	Minneapolis, Northfield and Southern 21	December 1948	DT-6-6-2000	C-C	On static display	Illinois Railway Museum in Union, Illinois		
	74812	Magma Arizona 10	July 1950	DRS-6-6-1500	C-C	On static display	Arizona Railway Museum at Chandler, Arizona		
	75273	Columbus and Greenville 606	May 1951	AS-416	A1A-A1A	On static display	Illinois Railway Museum in Union, Illinois		
	75826	Oregon and Northwestern 1	August 16, 1953	AS-616	C-C	On static display	Pacific Southwest Railway Museum in Campo, California		
	76112	Norfolk Southern 1616	December 1955	AS-416	A1A-A1A	On static display	North Carolina Transportation Museum in Spencer, North Carolina		

== Preserved electric locomotives ==
Photograph	Works no.	Locomotive	Build date	Builder	Model	Wheel arrangement	Disposition	Location	Notes	References
	38616	Anaconda Copper 401	1912	Baldwin	-	-	On static display	Oregon Electric Railway Museum in Brooks, Oregon		
	47450	Texas Transportation Company 1	1917	Baldwin	-	-	Stored	Elmendorf, Texas		
	-	Iowa Traction 50	October 1920	Baldwin-Westinghouse	-	-	Operational	Iowa Traction Railway in Mason City, Iowa		
	-	Iowa Traction 54	1923	Baldwin-Westinghouse	-	-	Operational	Iowa Traction Railway in Mason City, Iowa		

== Formerly preserved, scrapped ==
=== Steam locomotives ===
Photograph	Works no.	Locomotive	Build date	Model	Wheel arrangement	Last seen	Scrap date	Cause of scrapping	Notes	References
	53983	Chicago, Burlington and Quincy 510	November 1920	-	0-6-0	-	-	Unknown		
	58683	Buffalo Creek and Gauley 17	September 1925	12-38 ¼ E	2-8-2	-	March 23, 1970	Mechanical issues		
	62527	Duluth, Missabe and Iron Range 221	1941	-	2-8-8-4	Two Harbors, Minnesota	-	Vandalism and poor condition		
	70071	Baltimore and Ohio 659	January 1944	-	2-8-8-4	-	1960	Communication mistake regarding the locomotive's status		

==== Narrow gauge ====
Photograph	Works no.	Locomotive	Build date	Model	Gauge	Wheel arrangement	Last seen	Scrap date	Cause of scrapping	Notes	References
	73351	White Pass and Yukon 72	1947	12-28 ¼ E	3 ft	2-8-2	-	1969-1974	Destroyed in a roundhouse fire		

=== Diesel locomotives ===
Photograph	Works no.	Locomotive	Build date	Model	Gauge	Wheel arrangement	Last seen	Scrap date	Cause of scrapping	Notes	References
	72898	SNCF A1AA1A 62001	April 1946	DRS-6-4-660NA	4 ft 8^{1}/_{2} in	A1A-A1A	Gray, Haute-Saône in France	August 2022	Vandalism and poor condition	was classified as a Monument historique	
	73151	SNCF A1AA1A 62036	December 1946	DRS-6-4-660NA	4 ft 8^{1}/_{2} in	A1A-A1A	Dommary-Baroncourt in France	November 2023	Poor condition and communication mistake regarding the locomotive's status		
	73177	SNCF A1AA1A 62062	April 1947	DRS-6-4-660NA	4 ft 8^{1}/_{2} in	A1A-A1A	Gray, Haute-Saône in France	August 2022	Vandalism, poor condition		
	74916	Oregon and Northwestern 2	September 1950	AS-616	4 ft 8+^{1}/_{2} in	C-C	Tigard, Oregon	November 15, 2009	Poor condition		

== See also ==
- List of preserved ALCO locomotives
- List of preserved Lima locomotives
