= List of preserved Lima locomotives =

Preserved locomotives from notable builder

The Lima Locomotive Works, later Lima-Hamilton, have made many locomotives in their years of operation (1877 - 1951). Many of these engines have been preserved in museums, parks or on tourist railroads.

== Preserved steam locomotives ==
=== 0-4-0 ===
Image	Works no.	Locomotive	Build date	Wheel arrangement	Disposition	Location	Notes	References
	1087	National Cash Register 'Rubicon'	1909	0-4-0F	Static display	Carillon Historical Park in Dayton, Ohio		
	1139	National Cash Register 7 'South Park'	December 1910	0-4-0F	Static display	National Museum of Transportation in Kirkwood, Missouri		
	1310	National Cash Register 'Dayton'	June 1913	0-4-0F	Static display	Carillon Historical Park in Dayton, Ohio		

=== 0-6-0 ===
Image	Works no.	Locomotive	Build date	Wheel arrangement	Disposition	Location	Notes	References
	5992	Union Pacific 4455	October 1920	0-6-0	Static display	Colorado Railroad Museum in Golden, Colorado		
	6003	Union Pacific 4466	October 1920	0-6-0	Static display	California State Railroad Museum in Sacramento, California		
	6753	Southern Pacific 1285	April 1924	0-6-0	Static display	Monterey, California		
	6761	Southern Pacific 1293	April 1924	0-6-0	Static display	Tracy, California		
	8380	Alabama By-Products and Coke Co. 4046	February 1944	0-6-0	Static display	Heart of Dixie Railroad Museum in Calera, Alabama		
	8381	Duluth and Northeastern 29	February 1944	0-6-0	Operational	Prairie Village, Herman and Milwaukee Railroad in Madison, South Dakota		
	8410	United States Army 4076	March 1944	0-6-0	Operational	Heritage Park Historical Village in Calgary, Alberta	Operates as Canadian Pacific 2024.	

=== 0-8-0 ===
Image	Works no.	Locomotive	Build date	Wheel arrangement	Disposition	Location	Notes	References
	7222	Grand Trunk Western 8327	April 1927	0-8-0	Static display	Bandana Square in Saint Paul, Minnesota		

=== 2-6-0 ===
Image	Works no.	Locomotive	Build date	Wheel arrangement	Disposition	Location	Notes	References
	1027	Louisiana Cypress 2	1902	2-6-0	Under restoration	Reedsburg, Wisconsin		

=== 2-6-6-6 ===
Image	Works no.	Locomotive	Build date	Wheel arrangement	Disposition	Location	Notes	References
	7821	Chesapeake and Ohio 1601	December 1941	2-6-6-6	Static display	The Henry Ford in Dearborn, Michigan		
	7824	Chesapeake and Ohio 1604	December 1941	2-6-6-6	Static display	Baltimore and Ohio Railroad Museum in Baltimore, Maryland		

=== 2-8-0 ===
Image	Works no.	Locomotive	Build date	Wheel arrangement	Disposition	Location	Notes	References
	5063	Pennsylvania 7688	October 1915	2-8-0	Static display	Railroad Museum of Pennsylvania in Strasburg, Pennsylvania	Included in the NRHP	
	8758	United States Army 5820	1945	2-8-0	Awaiting overhaul	Keighley & Worth Valley Railway in Bradford, West Yorkshire, England		
	8784	United States Army 606	April 1945	2-8-0	Static display	Crewe Railroad Museum in Crewe, Virginia	Displayed in Norfolk and Western lettering.	
	8846	United States Army 607	June 1945	2-8-0	Static display	US Army Transportation Museum inFort Eustis, Newport News, Virginia	Last active steam locomotive used by the army.	
	8856	United States Army 5197	June 1945	2-8-0	Operational	Churnet Valley Railway in Stoke-on-Trent, Staffordshire, England		

=== 2-8-2 ===
Image	Works no.	Locomotive	Build date	Wheel arrangement	Disposition	Location	Notes	References
	5004	Georgia Railroad 302	1914	2-8-2	Static display	Augusta Museum of History in Augusta, Georgia		
	5872	St. Louis–San Francisco 4018	1919	2-8-2	Static display	Sloss Furnaces in Birmingham, Alabama		
	6314	Nickel Plate Road 624	October 1922	2-8-2	Stored, awaiting restoration	Owned by the Fort Wayne Railroad Historical Society, currently in Wabash, Indiana		
	6524	Illinois Central 1518	October 1923	2-8-2	Static display	Paducah, Kentucky	Last rostered and sole surviving 2-8-2 steam locomotive by the Illinois Central.	
	6642	Nickel Plate Road 639	December 1923	2-8-2	Static display	Miller Park in Bloomington, Illinois		
	7330	Chicago and Illinois Midland 551	September 1928	2-8-2	Static display	National Museum of Transportation in Kirkwood, Missouri	Sole surviving Chicago and Illinois Midland steam locomotive.	
	8939	SNCF 141 R 73	December 1945	2-8-2	Stored	Swiss Classic Train in Vallorbe, Switzerland	Coal fired	
	9199	SNCF 141 R 1108	1946	2-8-2	On static display	Écomusée du haut-pays et des transports in Breil-sur-Roya, France	Oil fired. Registered as a Monument historique	

=== 2-8-4 ===
Image	Works no.	Locomotive	Build date	Wheel arrangement	Disposition	Location	Notes	References
	7837	Pere Marquette 1223	November 1941	2-8-4	Static display	Grand Haven, Michigan	Included in the NRHP	
	7839	Pere Marquette 1225	October 1941	2-8-4	Operational	Steam Railroading Institute in Owosso, Michigan	Included in the NRHP	
	8663	Nickel Plate Road 755	August 1944	2-8-4	Static display	Conneaut station in Conneaut, Ohio		
	8665	Nickel Plate Road 757	August 18, 1944	2-8-4	Static display	Mad River & NKP Railroad Museum in Bellevue, Ohio		
	8667	Nickel Plate Road 759	August 1944	2-8-4	Static display	Steamtown National Historic Site in Scranton, Pennsylvania		
	8671	Nickel Plate Road 763	August 1944	2-8-4	Static display	Age of Steam Roundhouse in Sugarcreek, Ohio		
	8673	Nickel Plate Road 765	September 8, 1944	2-8-4	Operational	Fort Wayne Railroad Historical Society in New Haven, Indiana	Included in the NRHP	
	9262	Chesapeake and Ohio 2755	January 1947	2-8-4	Static display	Chief Logan State Park in Logan, West Virginia	Included in the NRHP	
	9263	Chesapeake and Ohio 2756	February 1947	2-8-4	Static display	Huntington Park in Newport News, Virginia		
	9380	Nickel Plate Road 779	May 13, 1949	2-8-4	Static display	Lincoln Park in Lima, Ohio	Final steam locomotive built by Lima.	

=== 2-10-4 ===
Image	Works no.	Locomotive	Build date	Wheel arrangement	Disposition	Location	Notes	References
	7237	Texas and Pacific 610	June 1927	2-10-4	Static display	Texas State Railroad in Palestine, Texas	Included in the NRHP	

=== 4-6-2 ===
Image	Works no.	Locomotive	Build date	Wheel arrangement	Disposition	Location	Notes	References
	7008	Atlanta and West Point 290	March 1926	4-6-2	Awaiting restoration	Southeastern Railway Museum in Duluth, Georgia		
	7625	Boston and Maine 3713	December 1934	4-6-2	Under restoration	Steamtown National Historic Site in Scranton, Pennsylvania		

=== 4-8-2 ===
Image	Works no.	Locomotive	Build date	Wheel arrangement	Disposition	Location	Notes	References
	6137	Illinois Central 2542	January 1921	4-8-2	Static display	McComb, Mississippi	Rebuilt from 2-10-2 no. 2906.	
	6190	Illinois Central 2500	July 1921	4-8-2	Static display	Fairview Park in Centralia, Illinois	Rebuilt from 2-10-2 no. 2953.	

=== 4-8-4 ===
Image	Works no.	Locomotive	Build date	Wheel arrangement	Disposition	Location	Notes	References
	7817	Southern Pacific 4449	May 20, 1941	4-8-4	Operational	Oregon Rail Heritage Center in Portland, Oregon		
	8014	Southern Pacific 4460	July 1943	4-8-4	Static display	National Museum of Transportation in Kirkwood, Missouri		
	9306	Chesapeake and Ohio 614	June 1948	4-8-4	Under restoration	Owned by RDJ America, currently in Strasburg, Pennsylvania		

=== Shay ===
Image	Works no.	Locomotive	Build date	Disposition	Location	Notes	References
	549	Cadillac-Soo Lumber Co. 3	1898	Static display	Cadillac, Michigan	Included in the NRHP	
	1503	Cass Scenic 5	November 1905	Operational	Cass Scenic Railroad in Cass, West Virginia	Oldest operational shay in preservation. Official locomotive of West Virginia.	
	2143	Goodman Lumber Co. 9	March 1909	Static display	Mid-Continent Railway Museum in North Freedom, Wisconsin		
	2317	Meadow River Lumber Company 1	May 1910	Under restoration	Steamtown National Historic Site in Scranton, Pennsylvania		
	2835	West Side Lumber 14	June 1916	Static display	Colorado Railroad Museum in Golden, Colorado		
	3169	Feather River Railway 1	November 1921	Static display	Hewitt Park in Oroville, California		
	3170	Hetch Hetchy 6	November 1921	Static display	El Portal Transportation Museum in El Portal, California	Included in the NRHP	
	3189	Cass Scenic 4	December 1922	Operational	Cass Scenic Railroad in Cass, West Virginia		
	3221	Cass Scenic 11	July 1923	Operational	Cass Scenic Railroad in Cass, West Virginia		
	3233	Mount Emily Lumber Co. 1	August 1923	Awaiting overhaul	Oregon Rail Heritage Center in Portland, Oregon		
	3248	Simpson Logging Co. 7	1924	Static display	Shelton, Washington	Included in the NRHP	
	3302	West Side Lumber 12	April 1926	Under restoration	Yosemite Mountain Sugar Pine Railroad in Fish Camp, California		
	3320	Cass Scenic 2	July 1928	Operational	Cass Scenic Railroad in Cass, West Virginia	Only shay known to have used all three fuel types.	
	3336	J. Neils Lumber Co. 5	May 1926	Operational	Illinois Railway Museum in Union, Illinois		
	3354	Western Maryland 6	May 1945	Operational	Cass Scenic Railroad in Cass, West Virginia	Last shay built, largest shay in preservation.	

=== Locomotive parts ===
Image	Works no.	Locomotive	Build date	Preserved part	Disposition	Location	Notes	References
	8020	Western Pacific 484	July 1943	Tender	Display	Western Pacific Railroad Museum in Portola, California		
	9363	Louisville and Nashville 1984	1944	Tender	Stored	Kentucky Railway Museum in New Haven, Kentucky		

== Preserved diesel locomotives ==
=== A-1349 (LS-750) ===
Image	Works no.	Locomotive	Build date	Disposition	Location	Notes	References
	9541	Cincinnati Union Terminal 25	June 1951	Operational	Whitewater Valley Railroad in Connersville, Indiana		

=== A-3080 (LS-1000) ===
Image	Works no.	Locomotive	Build date	Disposition	Location	Notes	References
	9400	Armco Steel 709	March 1950	Operational	Whitewater Valley Railroad in Connersville, Indiana		

=== A-3170 (LS-1200) ===
Image	Works no.	Locomotive	Build date	Disposition	Location	Notes	References
	9468	Baltimore and Ohio 320	December 1950	Static display	Whitewater Valley Railroad in Connersville, Indiana		
	9560	Armco Steel E110	August 1951	Static display	Illinois Railway Museum in Union, Illinois	Final Lima locomotive built	

== Formerly preserved, scrapped ==
Image	Works no.	Locomotive	Build date	Wheel arrangement	Last seen	Cause of scrapping	References
	6762	Southern Pacific 1294	April 1924	0-6-0	San Francisco Zoo in San Francisco, California	Environmental deterioration	
	7310	Texas and Pacific 638	1928	2-10-4	Texas State Fairgrounds in Dallas, Texas	Heavy vandalism	

== See also ==
- List of preserved ALCO locomotives
- List of preserved Baldwin locomotives
