= List of preserved ALCO locomotives =

A number of locomotives constructed by the American Locomotive Company (ALCO) have been preserved in museums, on tourist railroads, and various other locations across the world. Each locomotive is listed by serial number.

== Preserved steam locomotives ==
=== 0-4-0 ===
Image	Works no.	Locomotive	Build date	Wheel arrangement	Disposition	Location	Notes	References
	23117	Detroit Edison 207	1923	0-4-0T	Stored	Buckley Old Engine Show in Buckley, Michigan		
	54627	Consumers Company 701	1914	0-4-0	Awaiting cosmetic restoration	Mid-Continent Railway Museum in North Freedom, Wisconsin		
	66308	Southern Wood Preserving Company 3	January 1926	0-4-0T	On static display	Age of Steam Roundhouse Museum in Sugarcreek, Ohio		

=== 0-6-0 ===
Image	Works no.	Locomotive	Build date	Wheel arrangement	Disposition	Location	Notes	References
	28753	Buffalo, Rochester & Pittsburgh 152	January 1904	0-6-0	On static display	Age of Steam Roundhouse Museum in Sugarcreek, Ohio		
	37672	Morehead & North Fork 12	September 1905	0-6-0	Operational	Age of Steam Roundhouse Museum in Sugarcreek, Ohio		
	58750	MINAZ 1608	1919	0-6-0T	Stored	Seis De Agosto Sugar Mill in Calimete, Matanzas		
	58786	Western Pacific 164	November 1919	0-6-0	On static display	Hewitt Park in Oroville, California		
	58787	Western Pacific 165	November 1919	0-6-0	Operational	Western Pacific Railroad Museum in Portola, California		
	64384	Central Railroad of New Jersey 113	June 1923	0-6-0	Operational	Minersville, Pennsylvania		
	67536	E.J. Lavino and Company 3	August 1927	0-6-0T	On static display	Steamtown National Historic Site in Scranton, Pennsylvania		
	70402	Woodstown Central 9	October 1942	0-6-0	Operational	Woodstown Central Railroad in Woodstown, New Jersey		

==== Narrow gauge ====
Image	Works no.	Locomotive	Build date	Gauge	Wheel arrangement	Disposition	Location	Notes	References
	58657	SOCIEDAD HULLERA ESPAÑOLA 9	1918	1 ft 11+^{5}/_{8} in	0-6-0T	On static display	Pozo Santiago in Aller, Asturias		

=== 0-8-0 ===
Image	Works no.	Locomotive	Build date	Wheel arrangement	Disposition	Location	Notes	References
	66190	Louisville & Nashville 2152	March 1925	0-8-0	On static display	Kentucky Railway Museum in New Haven, Kentucky		

==== Narrow gauge ====
Image	Works no.	Locomotive	Build date	Gauge	Wheel arrangement	Disposition	Location	Notes	References
	58504	PTP XV\XVI 5	1918	2 ft 3+^{9}/_{16} in	0-6-0T	On static display	Sumberharjo Sugar Mill in Sumberharjo, Special Region Yogyakarta		

=== 2-6-0 ===
Image	Works no.	Locomotive	Build date	Wheel arrangement	Disposition	Location	Notes	References
	45528	Delaware, Lackawanna and Western 565	1908	2-6-0	On static display	Steamtown National Historic Site in Scranton, Pennsylvania		
	62635	Everett Railroad 11	1920	2-6-0	Operational	Everett Railroad in Hollidaysburg, Pennsylvania		
	65365	Norwood & St.Lawrence 210	1923	2-6-0	To be moved	St Lawrence Power and Equipment Museum in Madrid, New York		

=== 2-6-2 ===
Image	Works no.	Locomotive	Build date	Wheel arrangement	Disposition	Location	Notes	References
	42250	Northern Pacific 2435	1907	2-6-2	On static display	Lake Superior Railroad Museum in Duluth, Minnesota		
	66435	McCloud Railway 25	1925	2-6-2	Operational	Oregon Coast Scenic Railroad in Garibaldi, Oregon		

==== Narrow gauge ====
Image	Works no.	Locomotive	Build date	Gauge	Wheel arrangement	Disposition	Location	Notes	References
	57131	WDLR 1240, later TPT 3-22	1917	1 ft 11 5/8 in (600 mm)	2-6-2T	On static display	Musée des Transports de Pithiviers in Pithiviers, France	Registered as a Monument historique	
	57148	WDLR 1257, later TPT 3-20	1917	1 ft 11 5/8 in (600 mm)	2-6-2T	Operationnal	Tacots des Lacs in Grez-sur-Loing, France	Registered as a Monument historique	
	57156	WDLR 1265, later TPT 3-23	1916	1 ft 11 5/8 in (600 mm)	2-6-2T	Awaiting restoration	Ffestiniog Railway in Gwynedd, Wales		

=== 2-8-0 ===
Image	Works no.	Locomotive	Build date	Wheel arrangement	Disposition	Location	Notes	References
	5796	Great Northern 1147	August 1902	2-8-0	On static display	Wenatchee, Washington		
	28446	Southern Railway 630	February 1904	2-8-0	Operational	Tennessee Valley Railroad Museum in Chattanooga, Tennessee		
	28686	Illinois Central 790	September 1903	2-8-0	On static display	Steamtown National Historic Site in Scranton, Pennsylvania		
	39587	Duluth and Northeastern 28	1906	2-8-0	Operational	Lake Superior Railroad Museum in Duluth, Minnesota		
	42535	Copper Range 29	February 1907	2-8-0	On static display	Mid-Continent Railway Museum in North Freedom, Wisconsin		
	46940	Lake Superior and Ishpeming 24	January 1910	2-8-0	On static display	National Railroad Museum, in Green Bay, Wisconsin		
	46944	Lake Superior and Ishpeming 22	1910	2-8-0	On static display	Mid-Continent Railway Museum in North Freedom, Wisconsin		
	47732	Maine Central 501	1910	2-8-0	Undergoing restoration	Conway Scenic Railroad in North Conway, New Hampshire		
	52991	Maine Central 519	1913	2-8-0	On static display	Steamtown National Historic Site in Scranton, Pennsylvania		
	59309	Buffalo Creek and Gauley 14	1919	2-8-0	On static display	Gaithersburg, Maryland		
	61579	Buffalo Creek and Gauley 13	January 1920	2-8-0	On static display	Age of Steam Roundhouse Museum in Sugarcreek, Ohio		
	65188	Valley Railroad 97	November 1923	2-8-0	Operational	Valley Railroad in Essex, Connecticut		
	62623	Lowville and Beaver River 1923	1920	2-8-0	On static display	Steamtown National Historic Site in Scranton, Pennsylvania		
	67819	Kewaunee, Green Bay and Western 49	1929	2-8-0	On static display	Mid-Continent Railway Museum in North Freedom, Wisconsin		
	70284	MÁV 411.388	1942	2-8-0	Undergoing restoration	Great Central Railway in Ruddington, Nottinghamshire		
	70620	MÁV 411.380	1942	2-8-0	Source of spare parts	Great Central Railway in Ruddington, Nottinghamshire		
	70787	PKP Tr.203.296	1942	2-8-0	On static display	Jaworzyna Śląska, Poland		
	71076	TCDD 45174	1943	2-8-0	On static display	Ankara Railway Museum in Ankara, Turkey		
	71547	FS 736.083	1944	2-8-0	Stored	Turin, Italy		
	71554	FS 736.090	1944	2-8-0	Stored	Tithorea Depot		
	71579	FS 736.114	1944	2-8-0	On static display	National Railway Museum of Pietrarsa in Naples, Italy		

=== 2-8-2 ===
Image	Works no.	Locomotive	Build date	Wheel arrangement	Disposition	Location	Notes	References
	55972	Southern Pacific 786	August 1916	2-8-2	Undergoing restoration to operating condition			
	60319	Grand Trunk Western 4070	December 1918	2-8-2	Undergoing restoration to operating condition	Midwest Railway Preservation Society in Cleveland, Ohio		
	61858	Valley Railroad 40	August 1920	2-8-2	Operational	Valley Railroad in Essex, Connecticut		
	65430	Elk River Coal & Lumber 10	April 1924	2-8-2	Static Display	Baltimore & Ohio Station in Huntington, West Virginia		
	66033	Sugar Pine Lumber Company 4	1925	2-8-2ST	On static display	Age of Steam Roundhouse Museum in Sugarcreek, Ohio		
	68057	Hammond Lumber Company 17	September 1929	2-8-2ST	Operational	Mount Rainier Railroad and Logging Museum in Elbe, Washington		
	74293	SNCF 141 R 420	May 1946	2-8-2	Undergoing restoration to operating condition	Train à Vapeur d'Auvergne / Association de la 141R420 in Clermont-Ferrand, France	Coal fired. Classified as a Monument historique	
	74921	SNCF 141 R 1126	October 1946	2-8-2	Operational	Train historique de Toulouse in Toulouse, France	Oil fired. Classified as a Monument historique	

=== 2-8-8-2 ===
Image	Works no.	Locomotive	Build date	Wheel arrangement	Disposition	Location	Notes	References
	64070	Norfolk and Western 2050	March 1923	2-8-8-2	On static display	Illinois Railway Museum in Union, Illinois		

=== 2-8-4 ===
Image	Works no.	Locomotive	Build date	Wheel arrangement	Disposition	Location	Notes	References
	70849	Chesapeake and Ohio 2700	November 1943	2-8-4	On static display	Dennison Railroad Depot Museum in Dennison, Ohio	First K-4 built.	
	70854	Chesapeake and Ohio 2705	November 1943	2-8-4	On static display	National Museum of Railroad History & Innovation in Baltimore, Maryland		
	70856	Chesapeake and Ohio 2707	November 1943	2-8-4	On static display	Illinois Railway Museum in Union, Illinois		
	70865	Chesapeake and Ohio 2716	December 1943	2-8-4	Undergoing restoration to operating condition	Kentucky Railway Museum in New Haven, Kentucky		
	70876	Chesapeake and Ohio 2727	January 1944	2-8-4	On static display	National Museum of Transportation in Kirkwood, Missouri		
	70881	Chesapeake and Ohio 2732	1944	2-8-4	On static display	Science Museum of Virginia in Richmond, Virginia		
	70885	Chesapeake and Ohio 2736	August 1944	2-8-4	On static display	National Railroad Museum in Ashwaubenon, Wisconsin		
	75173	Chesapeake and Ohio 2760	March 1947	2-8-4	On static display	Riverside Park in Lynchburg, Virginia		
	75189	Chesapeake and Ohio 2776	March 1947	2-8-4	On static display	Jesse Eyman Memorial Park in Washington Court House, Ohio		
	75202	Chesapeake and Ohio 2789	March 1947	2-8-4	On static display	Hoosier Valley Railroad Museum in North Judson, Indiana	Last K-4 built.	

=== 2-10-2 ===
Image	Works no.	Locomotive	Build date	Wheel arrangement	Disposition	Location	Notes	References
	57978	Southern Pacific 975	January 1918	2-10-2	On static display	Illinois Railway Museum in Union, Illinois		

=== 4-6-0 ===
Image	Works no.	Locomotive	Build date	Wheel arrangement	Disposition	Location	Notes	References
	38526	Chicago and North Western 444	1906	4-6-0	On static display	Forney Transportation Museum in Denver, Colorado		
	42187	Chicago and North Western 1385	March 1907	4-6-0	Undergoing restoration to operating condition	Mid-Continent Railway Museum in North Freedom, Wisconsin		
	45727	Chicago and North Western 175	December 1908	4-6-0	Undergoing restoration to operating condition	Steam Railroading Institute in Michigan		
	46438	Western Pacific 94	September 1909	4-6-0	On static display	Western Railway Museum in Suisun City, California		
	55018	Central Vermont 220	February 1915	4-6-0	On static display	Shelburne Museum in Shelburne, Vermont		
	64280	Georgia Northern 102	1923	4-6-0	On static display	End-O-Line Railroad Park and Museum in Murray County, Minnesota		

=== 4-6-2 ===
Image	Works no.	Locomotive	Build date	Wheel arrangement	Disposition	Location	Notes	References
	42013	P.O. 4546, then P.O.-Midi 231-546, later SNCF 231 A 546	July 1908	4-6-2	On static display	Cité du Train in Mulhouse, France		
	46567	Savannah and Atlanta 750	January 1910	4-6-2	On static display	Southeastern Railway Museum in Duluth, Georgia		
	46831	Norfolk and Western 578	March 1910	4-6-2	On static display	Ohio Railway Museum in Worthington, Ohio		
	48510	Rock Island 938	1910	4-6-2	On static display	Illinois Railway Museum in Union, Illinois		
	59314	Atlantic Coast Line 1504	March 1919	4-6-2	Stored	Tennessee Valley Railroad Museum		
	61769	U.S. Sugar 148	April 1920	4-6-2	Operational	U.S. Sugar Corporation|		
	63262	Florida East Coast 153	1922	4-6-2	On static display	Gold Coast Railroad Museum in Miami, Florida		
	64313	Soo Line 2718	May 1923	4-6-2	On static display	National Railroad Museum in Green Bay, Wisconsin		
	64314	Soo Line 2719	May 1923	4-6-2	On static display, awaiting overhaul	Lake Superior Railroad Museum in Duluth, Minnesota		
	65555	Maine Central 470	May 1924	4-6-2	Undergoing restoration to operating condition	Washington Junction in Hancock, Maine		
	66888	Southern Railway 1401	July 1926	4-6-2	On static display	National Museum of American History in Washington, D.C.		

=== 4-6-4 ===
Image	Works no.	Locomotive	Build date	Wheel arrangement	Disposition	Location	Notes	References
	66555	Chesapeake and Ohio 490	1926	4-6-4	On static display	National Museum of Railroad History & Innovation in Baltimore, Maryland		
	67211	Nickel Plate Road 170	February 1927	4-6-4	On static display	National Museum of Transportation in Kirkwood, Missouri		

=== 4-6-6-4 ===
Image	Works no.	Locomotive	Build date	Wheel arrangement	Disposition	Location	Notes	References
	70160	Union Pacific 3977	June 1943	4-6-6-4	On static display	Cody Park, North Platte, Nebraska		
	70174	Union Pacific 3985	July 1943	4-6-6-4	Undergoing restoration to operational condition.	Railroading Heritage of Midwest America, Silvis, Illinois		

=== 4-8-0 ===
Image	Works no.	Locomotive	Build date	Wheel arrangement	Disposition	Location	Notes	References
	40329	Norfolk and Western 433	January 1907	4-8-0	Static display	Virginia Creeper Trail in Abingdon, Virginia		

=== 4-8-2 ===
Image	Works no.	Locomotive	Build date	Wheel arrangement	Disposition	Location	Notes	References
	68126	New York Central 2933	October 1929	4-8-2	On static display	National Museum of Transportation in St. Louis, Missouri		
	69338	New York Central 3001	October 1940	4-8-2	Undergoing restoration to operational condition.	Fort Wayne Railroad Historical Society		

=== 4-8-4 ===
Image	Works no.	Locomotive	Build date	Wheel arrangement	Disposition	Location	Notes	References
	68822	Union Pacific 814	September 1937	4-8-4	On static display	RailsWest Railroad Museum, inCouncil Bluffs, Iowa		
	69174	Union Pacific 833	October 1939	4-8-4	On static display	Utah State Railroad Museum, inOgden, Utah		
	69629	Grand Trunk Western 6323	February 1942	4-8-4	On static display	Illinois Railway Museum in Union, Illinois		
	69631	Grand Trunk Western 6325	February 1942	4-8-4	On static display	Age of Steam Roundhouse Museum in Sugarcreek, Ohio		
	69786	Nashville, Chattanooga and St. Louis 576	1942	4-8-4	Under restoration	Tennessee Central Railway Museum in Nashville, Tennessee.	Formerly on display at Centennial Park.	
	71974	Milwaukee Road 261	1944	4-8-4	Operational	Based in Minneapolis.		
	71978	Milwaukee Road 265	1944	4-8-4	On static display	Illinois Railway Museum in Union, Illinois		
	72785	Union Pacific 838	December 1944	4-8-4	Stored	Union Pacific Railroad, Cheyenne, Wyoming	Source of spare parts for 844.	
	72791	Union Pacific 844	December 1944	4-8-4	Operational	Union Pacific Railroad, Cheyenne, Wyoming	The only steam locomotive never retired by a North American Class I railroad.	

=== 4-8-8-4 ===
Image	Works no.	Locomotive	Build date	Wheel arrangement	Disposition	Location	Notes	References
	69575	Union Pacific 4004	September 1941	4-8-8-4	On static display	Holliday Park, Cheyenne, Wyoming		
	69576	Union Pacific 4005	September 1941	4-8-8-4	On static display	Forney Transportation Museum in Denver, Colorado		
	69577	Union Pacific 4006	September 1941	4-8-8-4	On static display	National Museum of Transportation, St. Louis, Missouri		
	69583	Union Pacific 4012	November 1941	4-8-8-4	On static display	Steamtown National Historic Site in Scranton, Pennsylvania		
	69585	Union Pacific 4014	November 1941	4-8-8-4	Operational	Union Pacific Railroad, Cheyenne, Wyoming	The world's largest operating steam locomotive.	
	69588	Union Pacific 4017	December 1941	4-8-8-4	On static display	National Railroad Museum, in Green Bay, Wisconsin		
	69589	Union Pacific 4018	December 1941	4-8-8-4	On static display	Museum of the American Railroad, Frisco, Texas		
	72780	Union Pacific 4023	November 1944	4-8-8-4	On static display	Kenefick Park, Omaha, Nebraska		

== Preserved diesel locomotives ==
=== Four-axle ===
Image	Works no.	Locomotive	Build date	Model	Disposition	Location	Notes	References
	69537	Mercury and Chase 213	August 1941	S-2	Operational	North Alabama Railroad Museum in Chase, Alabama		
	69664	New York, Susquehanna and Western 206	March 1942	S-2	On static display	Maywood Station Museum in Maywood, New Jersey		
	76791	Mercury and Chase 484	June 1949	S-2	Operational	North Alabama Railroad Museum in Chase, Alabama		
	78233	BUGX 1003	September 1950	S4M	Stored	Midland Railway Historical Association in Baldwin City, Kansas		
	6003-01	Chehalis Western Railroad 684	July 1968	C415	On static display	Fife History Museum and Cultural Center in Fife, Washington		
	6005-01	Monongahela Connecting Railroad 701	July 1968	C415	On static display	Railroad Museum of Pennsylvania in Strasburg, Pennsylvania		

=== Six-axle ===
Image	Works no.	Locomotive	Build date	Model	Wheel arrangement	Disposition	Location	Notes	References
	72125	Mercury and Chase 8652	January 1945	RSD-1	C-C	Operational	North Alabama Railroad Museum in Chase, Alabama		
	75318	Santa Fe 66L	May 1947	PA-1	C-C	On static display	National Museum of Mexican Railways in Puebla		
	76535	Santa Fe 59L	October 1948	PA-1	C-C	Undergoing restoration	Museum of the American Railroad, Frisco, Texas		
	76537	Santa Fe 60L	November 1948	PA-1	C-C	On static display	National Museum of Mexican Railways in Puebla		
	76541	Santa Fe 62L	October 1948	PA-1	C-C	Operational	On the Delaware-Lackawanna Railroad in Pennsylvania.		

== Formerly preserved, scrapped ==
=== Steam locomotives ===
Image	Works no.	Locomotive	Build date	Gauge	Wheel arrangement	Last seen	Scrap date	Cause of scrapping	Notes	References
	65290	Grand Trunk Western 5629	February 1924	4 ft 8+^{1}/_{2} in	4-6-2	Rock Island's Blue Island yard	July 1987	Negligence by Richard Jensen		
	68548	Coos Bay Lumber Co. 10	December 1930	4 ft 8+^{1}/_{2} in	2-8-2T	Williston, Florida	2011	Failure to find new owner		
	70850	Chesapeake and Ohio 2701	November 1943	4 ft 8+^{1}/_{2} in	2-8-4	-	-	Vandalism		
	72411	SZD YeA-3219	1945	4 ft 11+^{27}/_{32} in	2-10-0	Strategic Reserve in Bureya, Amur	2014	-		

=== Diesel locomotives ===
Works no.	Locomotive	Build date	Model	Wheel arrangement	Last seen	Scrap date	Cause of scrapping	Notes	References
70635	United States Army 8014	November 1942	RSD-1	C-C	Tennessee Valley Railroad Museum (TVRM) in Chattanooga, Tennessee	-	-		
73347	Delray Connecting Road 66	May 1945	S-1	B-B	-	2006	Poor condition		
74988	Lake State Railway 4610	November 1961	RS-2	B-B	Alpena, Michigan	July 23, 2005	Cannibalised for parts		
78286	Spokane Portland and Seattle 866	June 1950	FA	C-C	Portland, Oregon	February 2024	Became landlocked on a spur that BNSF wanted to abandon and remove; BNSF gave the ORHC a very short window to move it and they were unable to raise the funds to move it in time. It had been thoroughly gutted by this time.		
78870	Amtrak 126	June 1951	RS-3	B-B	Albany, New York	2022	Poor condition from being abandoned in the woods for years; gutted of usable parts and damaged by arson fires		

== See also ==
- List of preserved EMD locomotives
- List of preserved Baldwin locomotives
- List of preserved Lima locomotives
