= Baldwin AS-416 =

AS-416
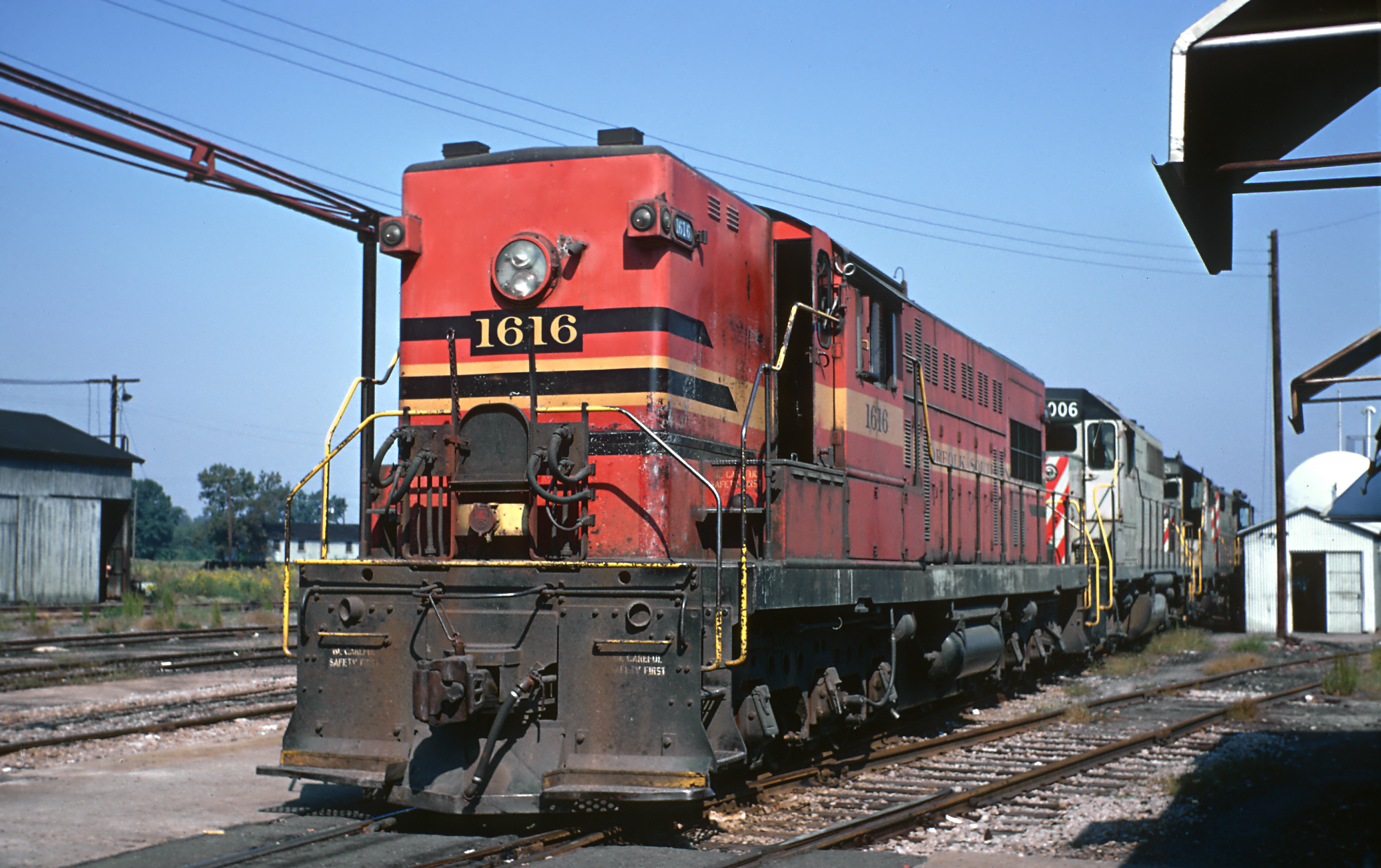
- Norfolk Southern number 1616, an AS-416, at Chesapeake, VA, in 1968
Type and origin
- Power type: Diesel-electric
- Builder: Baldwin-Lima-Hamilton Corporation
- Model: AS-416
- Build date: May 1951–December 1955
- Total produced: 25
Specifications
- Configuration
  - AAR: A1A-A1A
- Gauge: 4 ft 8 1/2 in (1,435 mm) standard gauge
- Length
  - Over couplers: 58 ft (18 m)
- Prime mover: 608A
- Aspiration: Turbocharger Elliott Company H704 (125 hp (93 kW))
- Generator: Westinghouse YG42B
- Traction motors: Westinghouse 370DL (4)
Performance figures
- Power output: 1,625 hp (1,212 kW) (marketed as 1,600 hp (1,200 kW))
Career
- Locale: North America
- Disposition: 2 preserved, remainder scrapped

The BLH AS-416 was a diesel-electric locomotive of the road switcher type rated at 1,625 hp (1,212 kW), that rode on three-axle trucks, having an A1A-A1A wheel arrangement.

Used in much the same manner as its four-axle counterpart, the AS-16, though the wheel arrangement spread out the axle load for operation on light rail such as are found on branch lines.

It was introduced in 1950 as a replacement of the DRS-6-4-1500 and remained in BLH's catalog until their cessation of locomotive manufacture in 1956.

Only 25 units were sold to four railroads — all of whom had bought the earlier model. The vast majority (17 of the 25 units) were purchased by the original Norfolk Southern Railway (1942–1982), becoming a signature locomotive for the company.

== Original owners ==
Image	Railroad	Quantity	Road numbers	Notes
	Savannah and Atlanta Railway	3	108–110	
	Columbus and Greenville Railway	1	606	
	Norfolk Southern Railway	17	1601–1617	
	Office des Chemins de Fer Algériens	4	040 DF 1–4	
	Total	25		

== Preservation ==
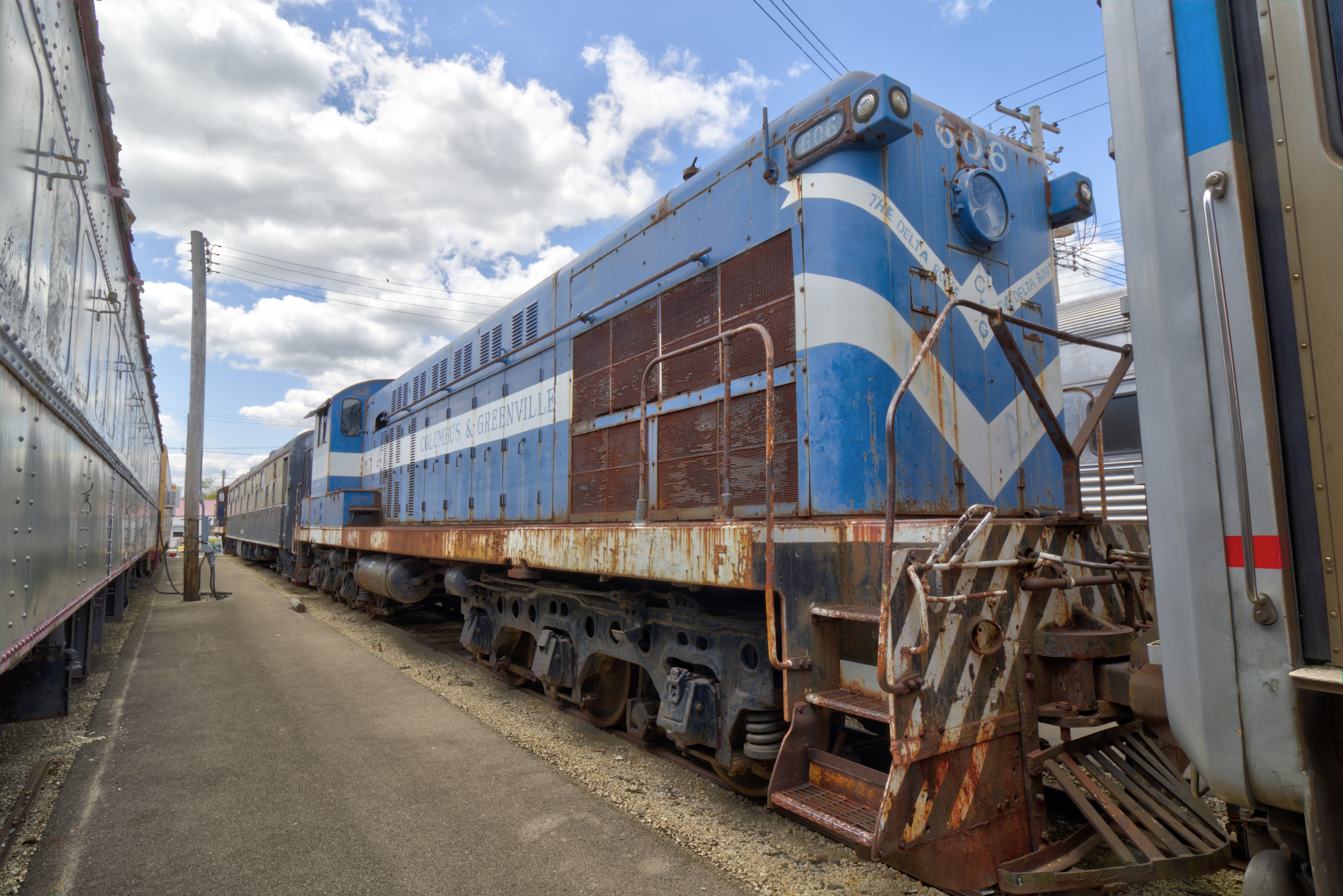
Columbus & Greenville Railway number 606 at Illinois Railway Museum

Two AS-416s survive:

- Columbus and Greenville 606 is preserved at the Illinois Railway Museum in Union, Illinois.
- Norfolk Southern 1616 is preserved at the North Carolina Transportation Museum in Spencer, North Carolina.
