= Canadian National class O-9 0-6-0 =

Canadian National class O-9
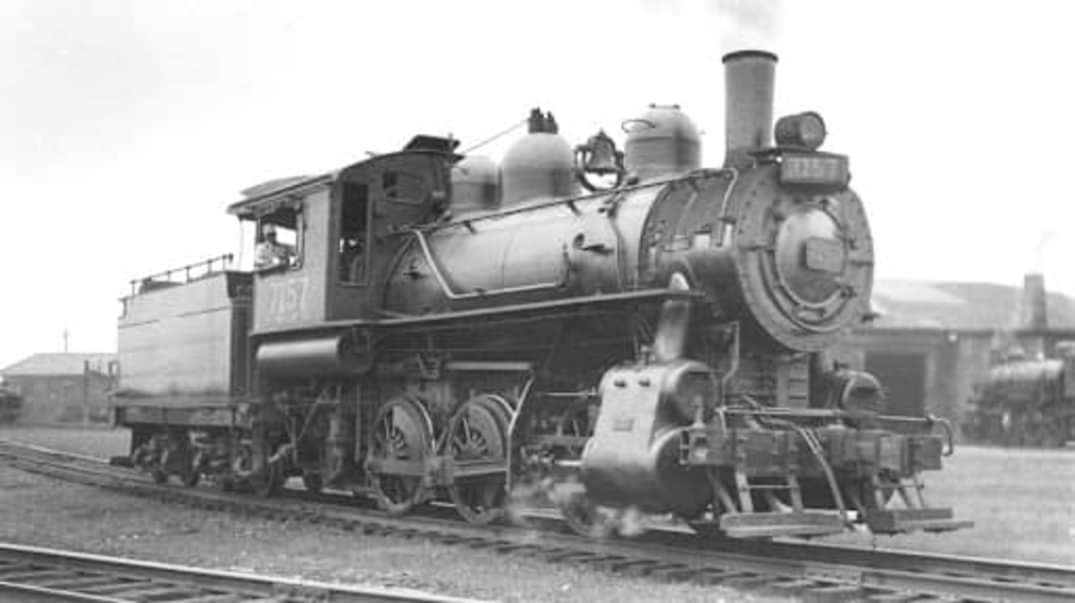
Type and origin
- Power type: Steam
- Build date: 1903-1913
- Total produced: 96
Specifications
- Configuration
  - Whyte: 0-6-0
  - UIC: C
- Gauge: 4 ft 8 1/2 in (1,435 mm)
- Driver dia.: 56 in (1,422 mm)
- Fuel type: Coal
- Boiler pressure: 190 lbf/in^{2} (13 kg/cm^{2})
- Cylinders: Two, outside
- Cylinder size: 20 in × 26 in (508 mm × 660 mm)
- Valve gear: Stephenson
- Valve type: Piston valves
- Loco brake: Air
- Train brakes: Air
- Couplers: Knuckle
Performance figures
- Tractive effort: 30,000 lbf (133.4 kN)
Career
- Operators: Grand Trunk Railway; Canadian National Railway; Strasburg Rail Road
- Retired: 1959
- Preserved: CN 7312
- Disposition: 1 preserved, remainder scrapped

Canadian National Railway (CN) Class O-9 steam locomotives were of 0-6-0 wheel arrangement in the Whyte notation, or " C " in UIC classification. These locomotives were built for the Grand Trunk Railway (GT) and Detroit and Toledo Shore Line Railroad (D&TSL) from 1903 through 1913. Many were scrapped during the 1930s although some survived into the 1950s with sequential renumbering into the CN 7200 series in 1952 and 7300 series in 1956. The sole survivor of this class is number 7312, which has been owned by the Strasburg Rail Road in Pennsylvania since 1960.

Builder	Works numbers	Dates	CN numbers	GT numbers	Notes
GT shops	1430-1454; 1490-1499	1903-1907	7124-7152; 7184-7189	1650-1684	
Baldwin	25140	1905	7218		built as D&TSL number 101
ALCO	42061-42070; 42327-42330	1907	7153-7154; 7190-7201	1685-1698	
Baldwin	32852-32853; 32859-32860; 32871-32872; 32885-32886; 32893-32894	1908	7155-7157; 7202-7208	1699-1708	
Lima	1200-1209	1912	7158; 7209-7217	1709-1718	
MLW	50662-50671	1912	7159-7168	1719-1728	
CLC	1099-1113	1913	7169-7183	1729-1743	
Baldwin	39241	1913	7219		built as D&TSL number 104
