= Cotton Belt 336 =

Historic railroad steam locomotive

St. Louis Southwestern Railway (Cotton Belt Route) Steam Locomotive #336
- Manufacturer: Baldwin Locomotive Works
- Constructed: 1909
- St. Louis Southwestern Railway (Cotton Belt Route) Steam Locomotive #336
- U.S. National Register of Historic Places
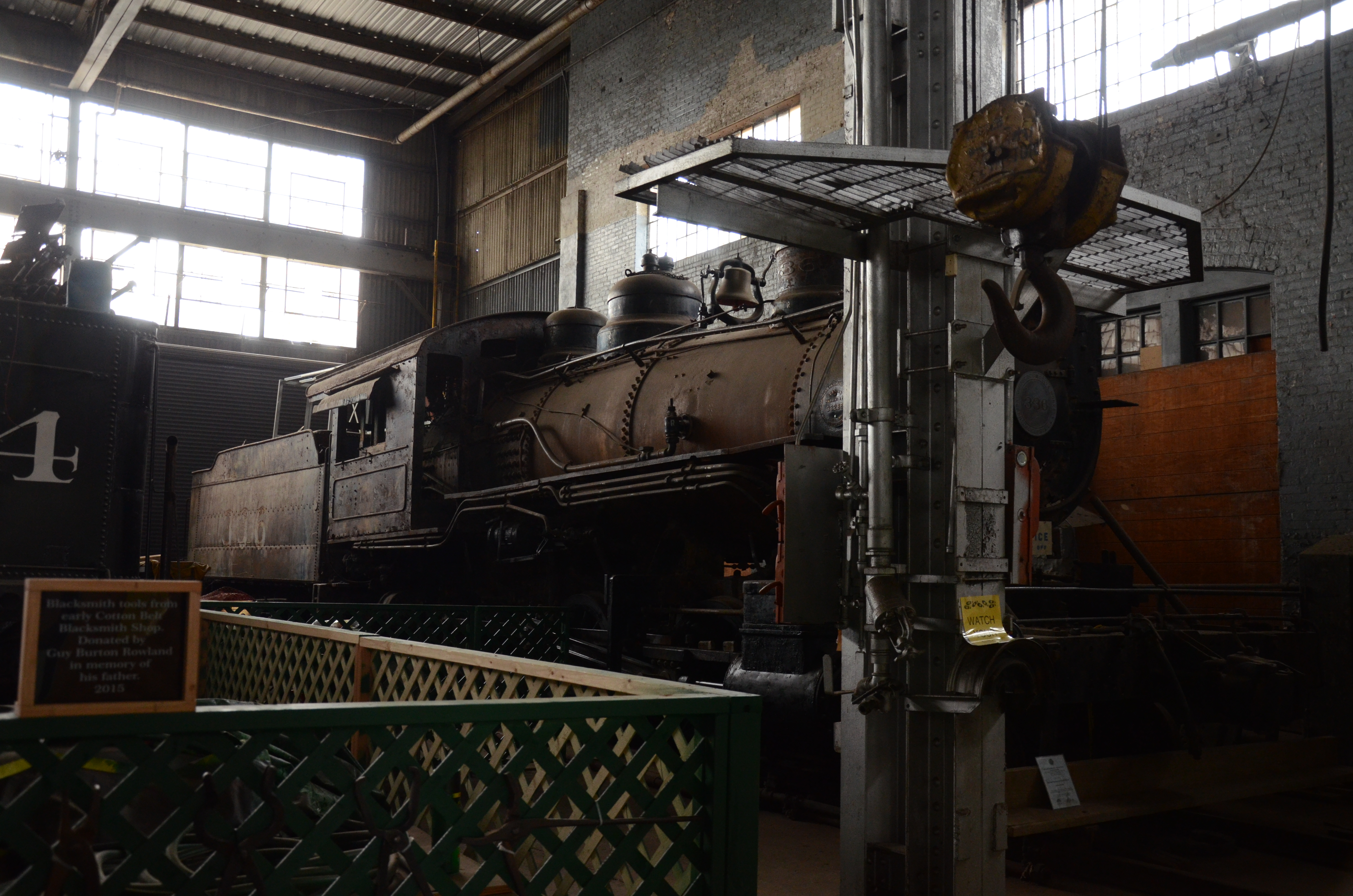

- Location within Arkansas Location within the United States
- Location: 1700 Port Rd., Arkansas Railroad Museum, Pine Bluff, Arkansas
- Coordinates: 34°13′37″N 91°59′4″W
- Area: Less than one acre
- Built: 1909
- NRHP reference No.: 06001276
- Added to NRHP: January 24, 2007

The St. Louis Southwestern Railway (Cotton Belt Route) Steam Locomotive #336 is a historic railroad steam locomotive, located at the Arkansas Railroad Museum in Pine Bluff, Arkansas. It is a Class D3 2-6-0 Mogul-style locomotive, built in 1909 by the Baldwin Locomotive Works in Philadelphia, Pennsylvania. She served on the St. Louis Southwestern Railway (a.k.a. the Cotton Belt Route) until 1947, and served industrial customers until 1963. It was placed on display in Lewisville, Arkansas until 1994, when it was donated to the museum. It is the last remaining 330-series locomotive (of ten) used by the Cotton Belt.

The locomotive was listed on the National Register of Historic Places in 2007.

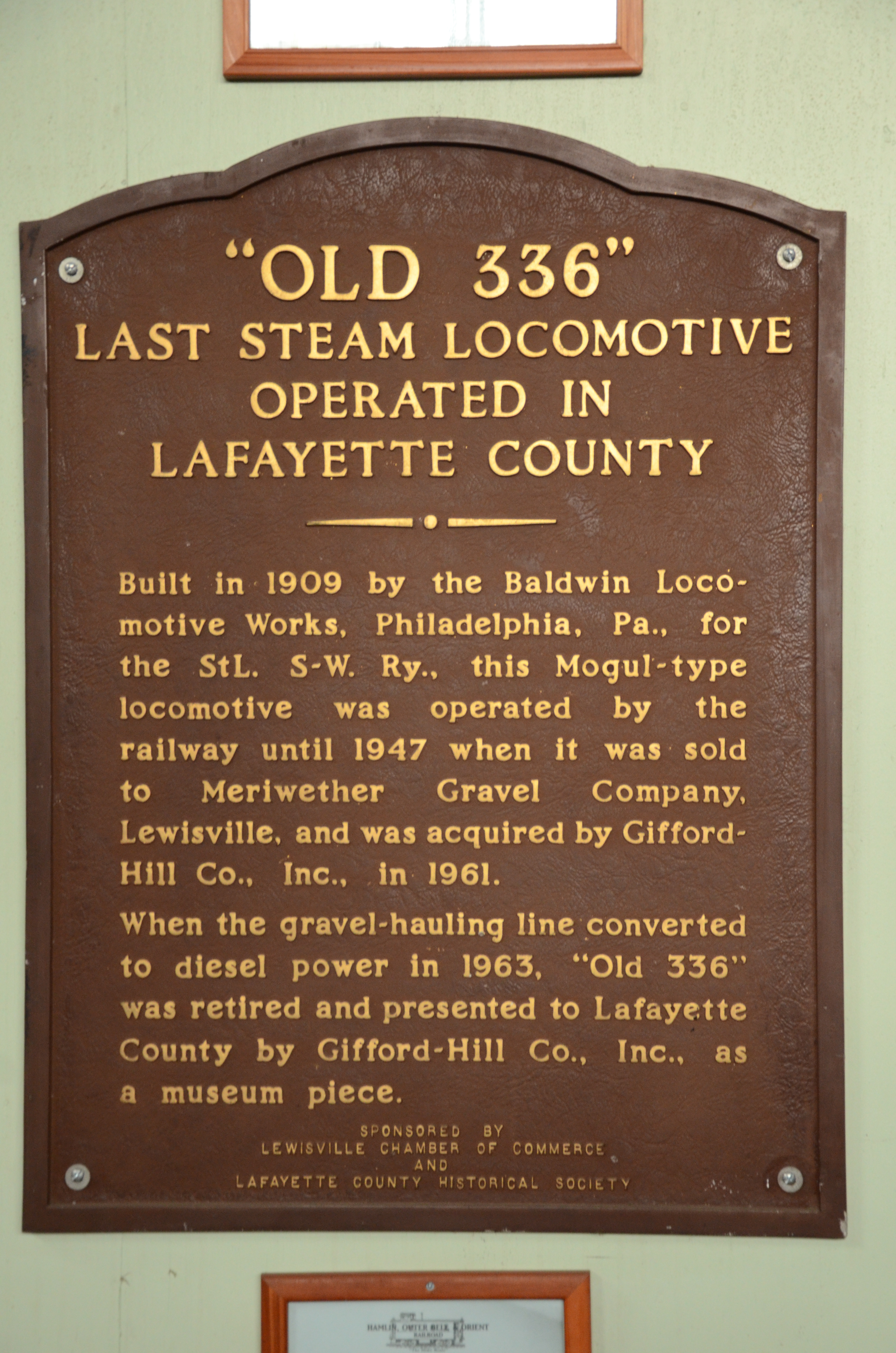
Plaque accompanying Steam Locomotive 336

== See also ==
- National Register of Historic Places listings in Jefferson County, Arkansas
