= Baldwin DRS-6-4-660NA =

Baldwin DRS-6-4-660
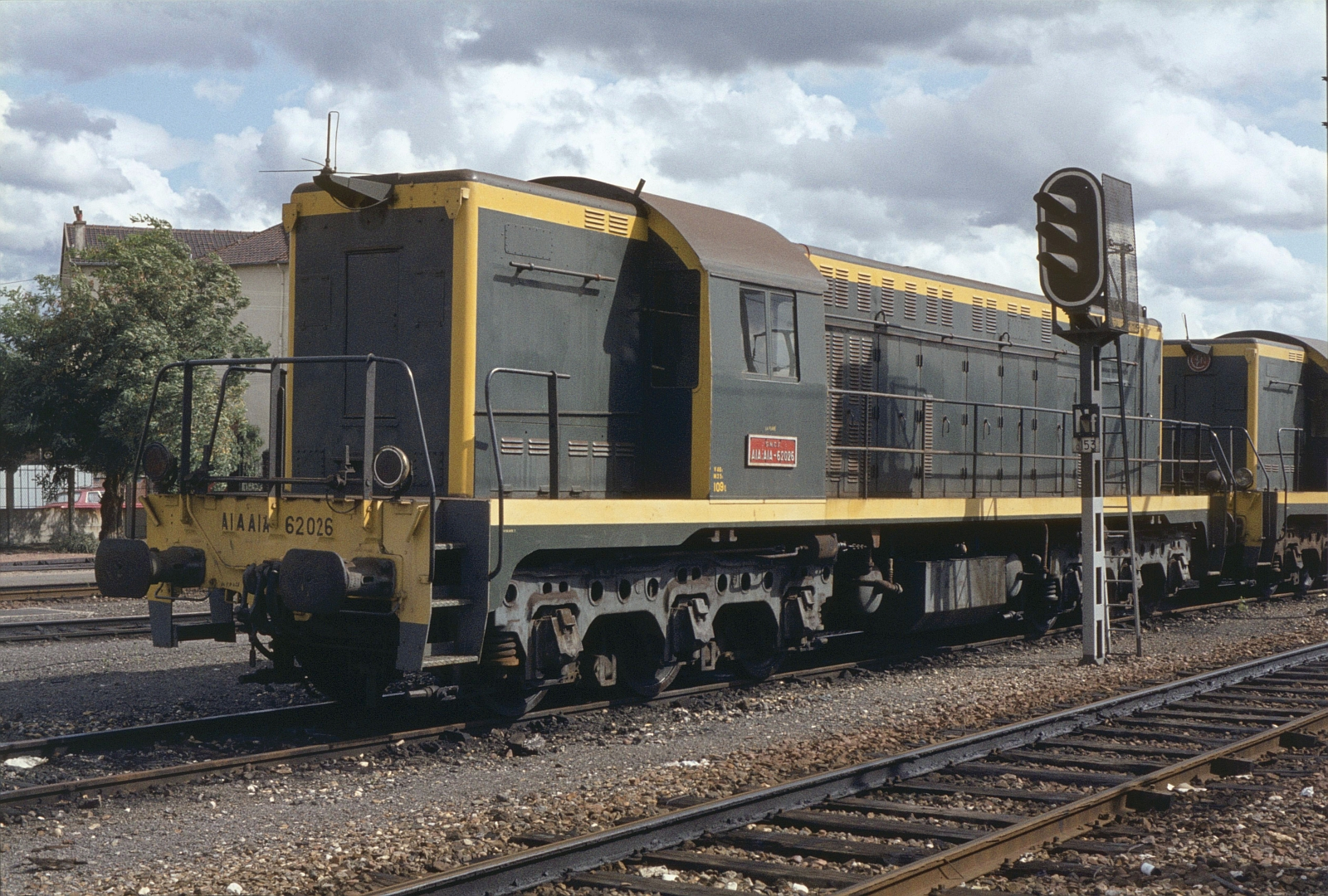
- SNCF 62026 at Bobigny in 1983.
Type and origin
- Power type: Diesel-electric
- Builder: Baldwin Locomotive Works
- Model: DRS-6-4-660
- Build date: 1946–1948
- Total produced: 106
Specifications
- Configuration
  - AAR: A1A-A1A
  - UIC: (A1A)(A1A)
- Gauge: 1,435 mm (4 ft 8 1/2 in)
- Prime mover: 606NA
- Aspiration: Naturally aspirated
- Generator: DC Generator
- Traction motors: DC traction motors
- Cylinders: 6
- Transmission: Electrical
- Loco brake: Straight air
- Train brakes: Air
Performance figures
- Power output: 660 hp (492 kW)
Career
- Locale: Morocco, France

The Baldwin DRS-6-4-660, known in France as the A1AA1A 62000, is a road switcher diesel-electric locomotive built by Baldwin Locomotive Works between 1946 and 1948. The DRS-6-4-660s was based on the Baldwin VO-1000. They were powered by a naturally aspirated six-cylinder diesel engine rated at 660 horsepower (492 kW), and rode on a pair of three-axle trucks in an A1A-A1A wheel arrangement. 106 of these models were built for railroads in Morocco and France.

== Name designation ==
DRS - Diesel Road Switcher
6 - Six axles
4 - Four powered axles
660 - 660 horsepower

== Original buyers ==
Image	Railroad	Quantity	Road numbers	Notes
	SNCF	100	040-DA-1 to 040-DA-100	Renumbered 62001-62100
	Morocco	6	DB-401 to DB-406	
	Totals	106		
