= Baldwin DRS-6-4-1500 =

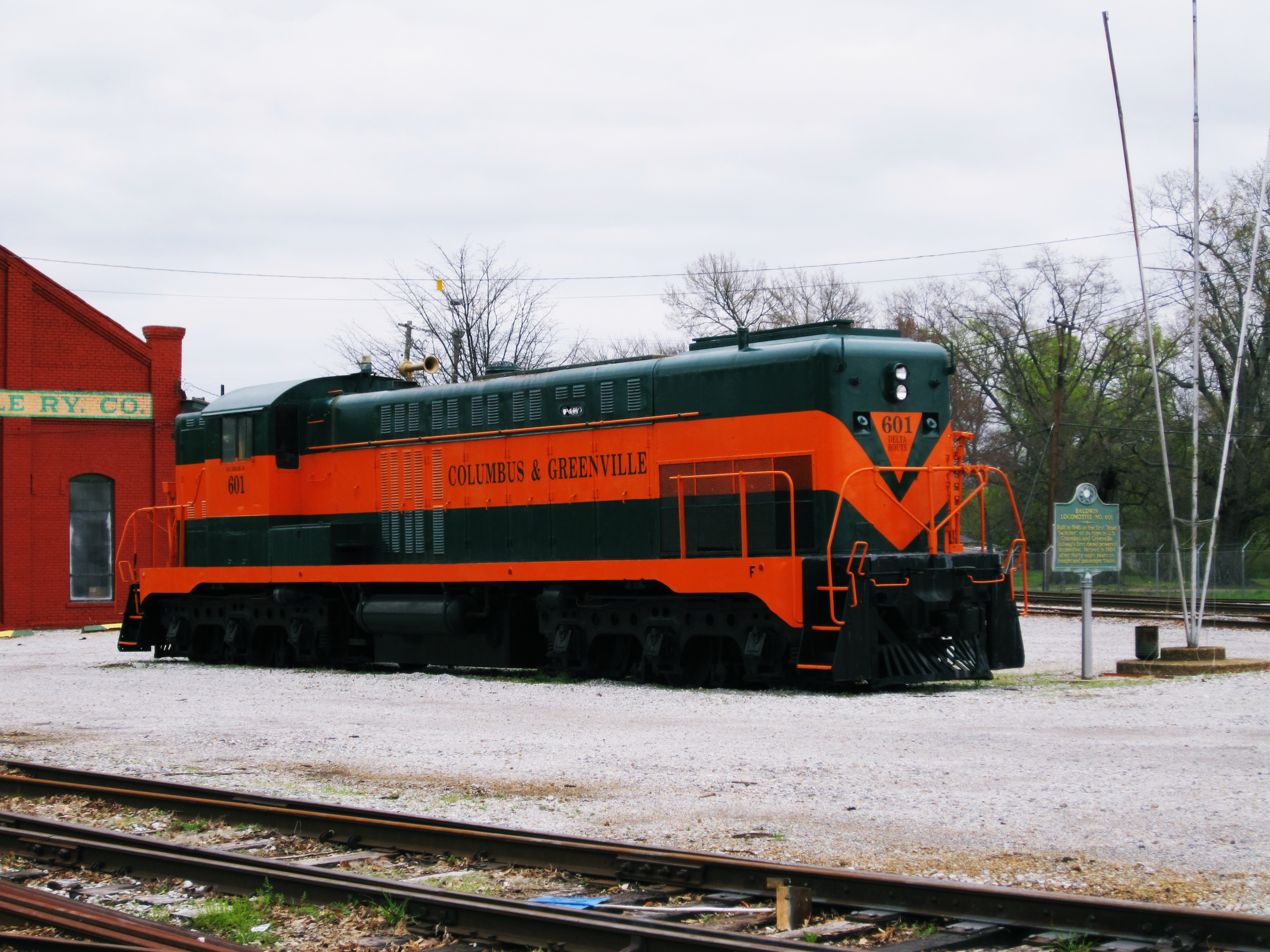
- Columbus & Greenville Railway 601 on display in Columbus, Mississippi
Type and origin
- Power type: Diesel-electric
- Builder: Baldwin Locomotive Works
- Model: DRS-6-4-1500
- Build date: 1946–1952
- Total produced: 91
Specifications
- Configuration
  - AAR: A1A-A1A
- Trucks: 6-wheel
- Wheel diameter: 42 in (1.1 m)
- Minimum curve: 30 degrees
- Length: 58 ft (18 m)
- Adhesive weight: 187,000 lb (85,000 kg)
- Loco weight: 280,000 lb (130,000 kg)
- Prime mover: 608SC
- RPM
  - Maximum RPM: 625
- Engine type: Four-stroke diesel engine
- Generator: Westinghouse WE471
- Traction motors: Westinghouse WE370
  - Continuous: 42,800 lbf (190 kN) at 10.5 mph (16.9 km/h) with 15:63 gearing
- Gear ratio: 68:15
- Compressor: Westinghouse 3C2C
Performance figures
- Maximum speed: 65 mph (105 km/h)
- Power output: 1,500 hp (1,100 kW)
Career
- Disposition: 1 preserved, remainder scrapped

The Baldwin DRS-6-4-1500 was a diesel-electric locomotive that was produced by Baldwin Locomotive Works between 1946 and 1952. DRS-6-4-1500, one of Baldwin's heavy road-switchers, was rated at 1,500 horsepower and powered with a 608SC engine and rode on two three-axle trucks with an A1A-A1A wheel arrangement. As was the case with nearly all of Baldwin's diesel designs, Westinghouse supplied the company with all of the DRS-6-4-1500's needed internal components such as traction motors, generators, and air equipment.

Overall, 91 units were sold in the United States and three North African countries over the course of six years. 29 units were sold domestically to seven railroads between 1946 and 1948, but the model did far better in the export market with 62 units purchased for Algerian, Moroccan, and Tunisian railways between 1946 and 1952. The model designed for foreign sale in Africa was listed as the DRS-6-4-1500E and was essentially the same as its domestic counterpart except for a different end cab setup. The DRS-6-4-1500 was replaced in Baldwin's catalog by the AS-416 in 1950, but it continued to be produced for export orders until 1952.

== Original buyers ==
| Image | Railroad | Quantity | Road Number(s) | Date Built | Notes |
|---|---|---|---|---|---|
| | Baldwin Locomotive Works | 2 | 1500 (demo) | 1946 | Sold to Union Pacific as 1250 in 1948. |
| | Baldwin Locomotive Works | 2 | 1501 (demo) | 1948 | Sold to Kennecott Copper as 901 in 1949, wrecked in 1952 and reconfigured to B-B trucks. |
| | Columbus & Greenville Railway | 5 | 601–605 | 1946-1947 | 601 was the first diesel road switcher sold domestically by Baldwin. |
| | Chicago & North Western Railway | 1 | 1504 | 1948 | Repowered by General Motors’ Electro-Motive Division 1500 hp 16-567C. |
| | Norfolk Southern Railway | 10 | 1501–1510 | 1947-1948 | 1504, 1507, and 1508 were sold to Durham & Southern as 363, 364, and 365, respectively. The A1A-A1A trucks on 1507 and 1508 were replaced by B-B trucks. |
| | Savannah & Atlanta Railway | 8 | 100–107 | 1948 | |
| | Southern Pacific Company | 3 | 5200–5202 | 1948 | |
| | Chemins de fer Algériens | | 40 | DA 1-15 | 1946-1947 |
| | Chemins de fer Algériens | DB 1-25 | 40 | 1947-1948 | |
| | Chemins de fer du Maroc | 18 | DA 101 | 1946 | Renumbered as DA 301. |
| | Chemins de fer du Maroc | 18 | DA 102-105 | 1947 | Renumbered as DA 302-305. |
| | Chemins de fer du Maroc | 18 | DA 201-206 | | |
| | Chemins de fer du Maroc | 18 | DA 306-307 | 1949 | |
| | Chemins de fer du Maroc | 18 | DA 308-309 | 1951 | |
| | Chemins de fer du Maroc | 18 | DC 331-333 | 1952 | Renumbered as DA 310-312. |
| | Chemins de fer Tunisiens | 4 | DA 1-4 | 1946 | Renumbered as DA 301-304 in 1950/52, sold to Chemins de fer du Maroc in 1958 and renumbered to DA 321-324 with power reduced to 750 hp. |
| | Total | 91 | | | |

== Preservation ==
• Columbus & Greenville #601 is preserved at the Columbus & Greenville's shop facilities in Columbus, Mississippi.
