= Simpson Logging Company Locomotive No. 7 and Peninsular Railway Caboose No. 700 =

- U.S. National Register of Historic Places
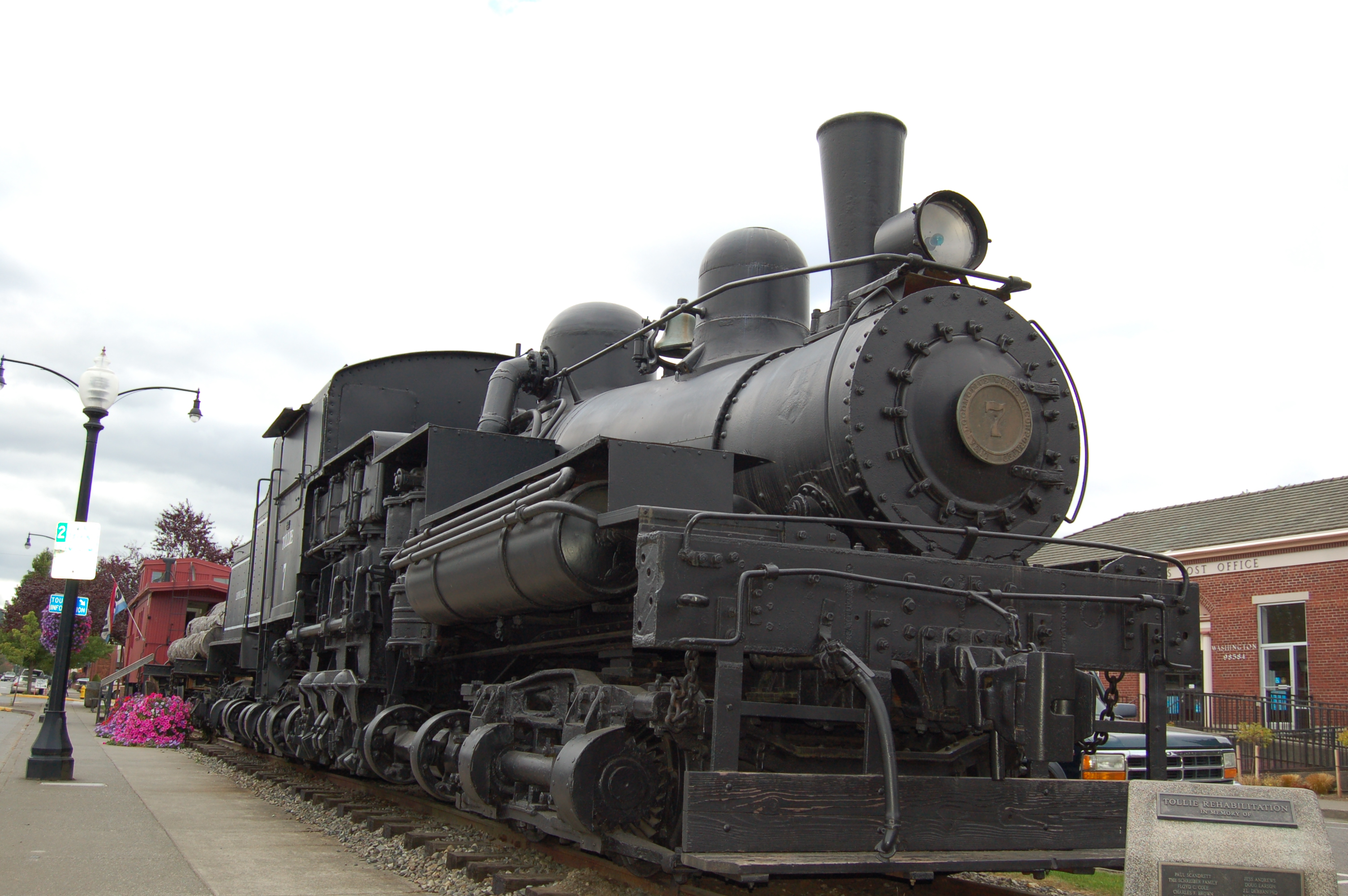
- Simpson Logging Locomotive No 7

- Location within Washington (state)
- Location: 3rd and Railroad Aves., Shelton, Washington
- Coordinates: 47.21307°N 123.10167°W
- Area: less than one acre
- Built: 1924 (locomotive); 1920s (caboose)
- Built by: Lima Machine Works; Peninsular Railway Co.
- NRHP reference No.: 84003532
- Added to NRHP: January 12, 1984

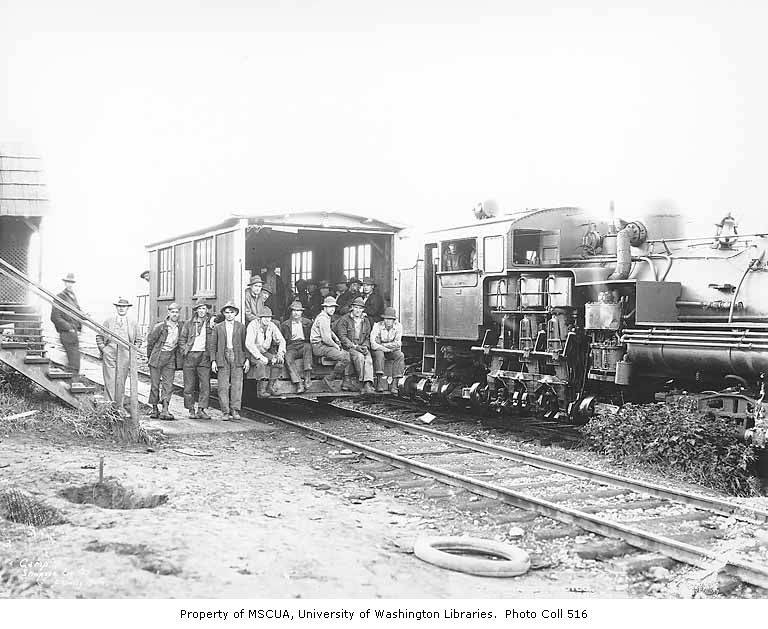
Loggers with transport car and Shay locomotive, Camp 7, Simpson Logging Company, Grays Harbor County, Washington, c.1928

The Simpson Logging Company Locomotive No. 7 (also known as "Tollie") and Peninsular Railway Caboose No. 700 are a locomotive and caboose in Shelton, Washington. Together they have been listed on the National Register of Historic Places since 1984. The locomotive, plus a flatbed log car carrying several large logs, and the caboose form a train, set up appear as if just arrived from the woods, on Railroad Avenue in front of Shelton's U.S. Post Office. Both the locomotive and the caboose served the Simpson Logging Company.

In 1887, Sol G. Simpson moved to Mason County, Washington with his family. He found a job laying rails and railroad ties for Port Blakely Mill Company. In 1890, he established the S. G. Simpson Company in Matlock, Washington; two of his brothers worked for the company. In 1925, the company opened the Reed sawmill, in Shelton, Washington.

"Tollie", a Shay locomotive, was built in 1924 by the Lima Machine Works.

Caboose No. 700 was built in Shelton by the Peninsular Railway in the 1920s, which it served until 1936. After that it served the Simpson Logging Company. It had a large side door like a box-car would, and was used to transport supplies to logging camps. It was retired in 1965 and was brought to Shelton in 1983. The caboose's interior was remodeled to serve as the Shelton Mason County Chamber of Commerce. The two cars are linked together and are situated in downtown Shelton between 2nd and 3rd Street on a narrow parcel of land that belonged to the Logging Company railroad. Both the locomotive as well as the caboose have sustained their original integrity and are positioned on the original right of way for the railroad.
