= Canadian National 7312 =

Preserved CN O-9 class locomotive

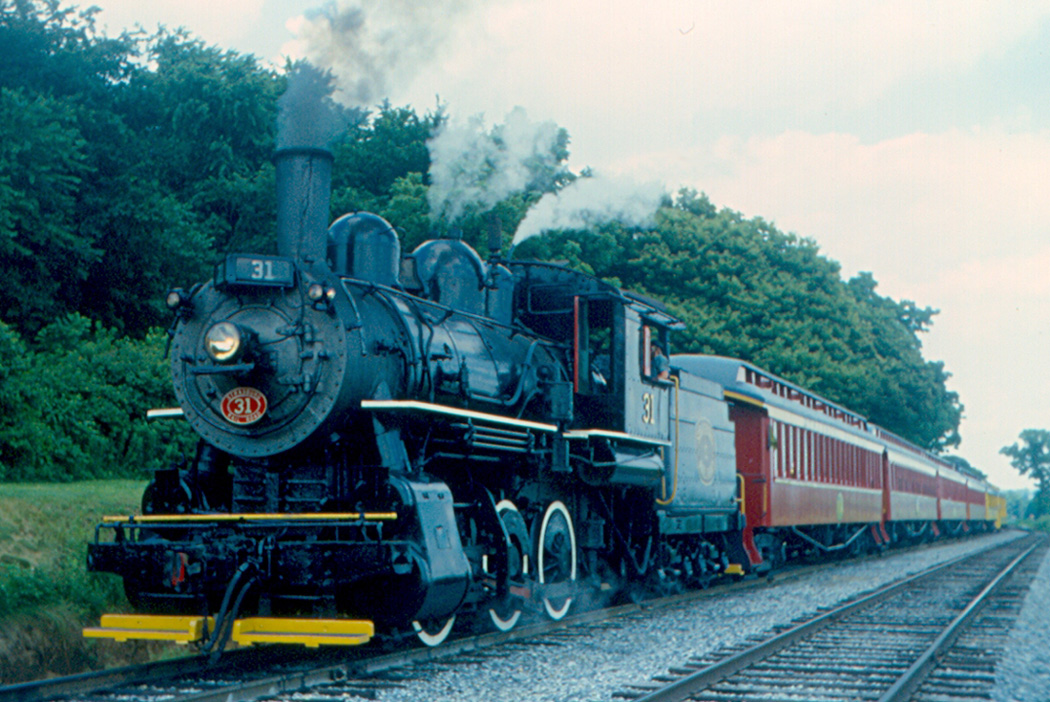
- Canadian National No. 7312 (Strasburg No. 31) hauling an excursion train at Groff's Grove in July 1979
Type and origin
- Power type: Steam
- Builder: Baldwin Locomotive Works
- Serial number: 32894
- Model: O-9-a
- Build date: August 1908
Specifications
- Configuration
  - Whyte: 0-6-0
- Gauge: 4 ft 8 1/2 in (1,435 mm)
- Driver dia.: 56 in (1.422 m)
- Adhesive weight: 153,384 lb (69.6 t)
- Loco weight: 153,384 lb (69.6 t)
- Fuel type: Coal
- Boiler pressure: 165 lbf/in^{2} (1.14 MPa)
- Cylinders: Two, outside
- Cylinder size: 22 in × 26 in (559 mm × 660 mm)
- Valve gear: Stephenson
- Valve type: Piston valves
- Loco brake: Air
- Train brakes: Air
- Couplers: Knuckle
Performance figures
- Tractive effort: 31,000 lbf (137.89 kN)
Career
- Operators: Grand Trunk Railway; Canadian National Railway; Strasburg Rail Road
- Class: O-9-a
- Power class: CN: 30%
- Numbers: GT 118; GT 1708; CN 1708; CN 7157; CN 7240; CN 7312; SRC 31; SRC 7312
- Locale: Canada/Lancaster County, PA
- Retired: July 1958
- Restored: September 1, 1960
- Current owner: Strasburg Rail Road
- Disposition: Stored, awaiting 1,472-day inspection and overhaul

Canadian National 7312 is a O-9-a class 0-6-0 "Switcher" type steam locomotive, built in August 1908 by the Baldwin Locomotive Works (BLW) for the Canadian National Railway (CN). It is owned and currently undergoing a heavy overhaul by the Strasburg Rail Road (SRC) outside of Strasburg, Pennsylvania.

== History ==
=== Revenue service ===
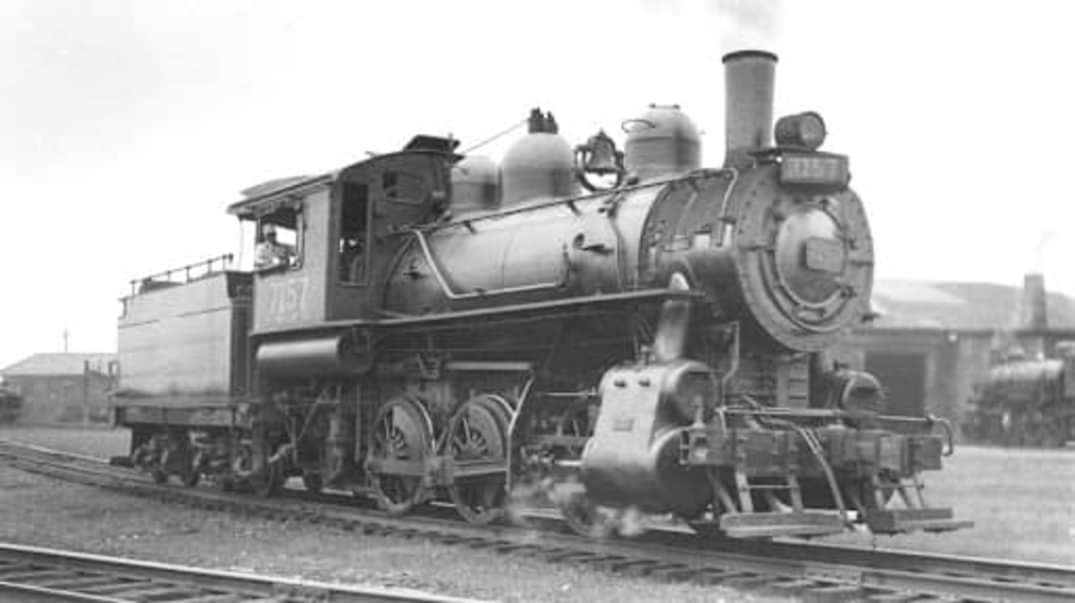
No. 7312 when it operated on Canadian National as No. 7157

The locomotive was built by the Baldwin Locomotive Works (BLW) in August 1908 for the Grand Trunk Railway (GT) as No. 118, and was renumbered to No. 1708 in September 1919. In January 1923, the Grand Trunk Railway was merged into the Canadian National Railway (CN). Three months after the creation of Canadian National, No. 1708 was renumbered to No. 7157, a number the locomotive carried until February 1952 when it was renumbered to No. 7240. In January 1957, the locomotive received its final CN number as No. 7312. In July 1958, No. 7312 was retired at Stratford, Ontario where it had been working as the shop switcher.

=== Excursion service ===
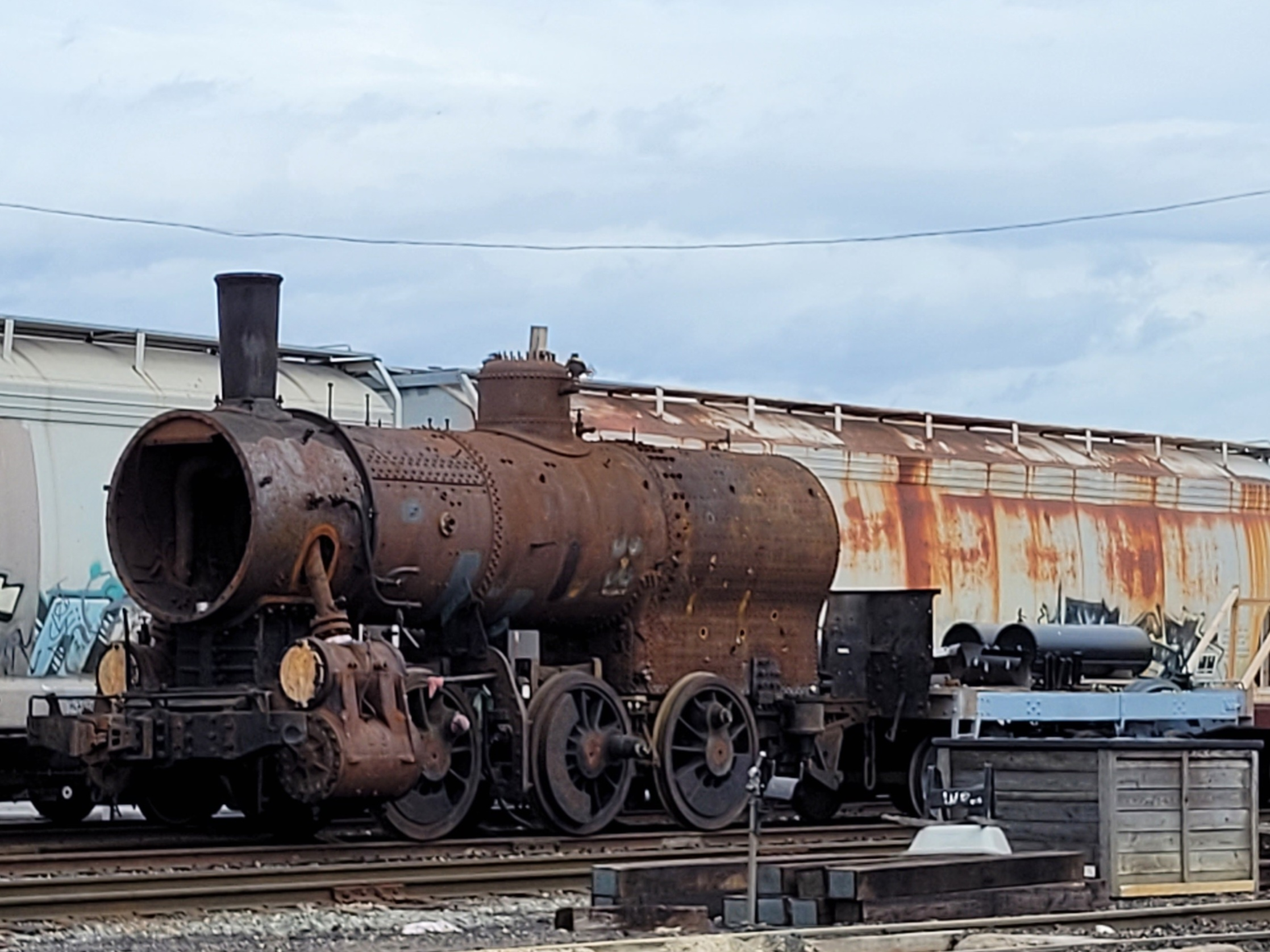
No. 7312 disassembled in 2022

In June 1959, No. 7312 was discovered by Strasburg Rail Road (SRC) vice president Bud Swearer who was visiting the CN yard at Stratford. The SRC had intended to purchase a steam locomotive to power freight and passenger excursions and No. 7312 was of appropriate size for the operation. The SRC negotiated the CN for the locomotive, which was ultimately purchased by a consortium of the SRC officials in September 1959. Arriving at Strasburg on June 15, 1960, the locomotive was renumbered to No. 31 and placed into service on September 1, 1960, becoming the first steam locomotive to reenter service in the United States. The locomotive was purchased outright by the SRC in 1968.

No. 7312 was taken out of service in October 2009 to undergo its heavy, extensive Federal Railroad Administration (FRA) 1,472-day inspection and overhaul, and is slowly undergoing this overhaul.

== See also ==
- Great Western 90
- Norfolk and Western 475
- Canadian National 89
- Canadian National 1009
- BEDT No. 15
- Canadian National 7470
- Canadian National class O-9 0-6-0
- Wilmington and Western 58

== Sources ==
- Barry, Steve (2006). Rail Power. Voyageur Press. p. 21. ISBN 978-1610604918.
- Bell, Kurt; Plant, Jeremy (2015). Strasburg Rail Road In Color (1st ed.). Morning Sun Books. ISBN 978-1582484792.
- Conner, Eric; Barrall, Steve (2017). Strasburg Rail Road. Images of Rail (1st ed.). Arcadia Publishing. ISBN 978-1-4671-2507-9.
