= Union, Illinois =

Village in McHenry County, Illinois, United States

- Village
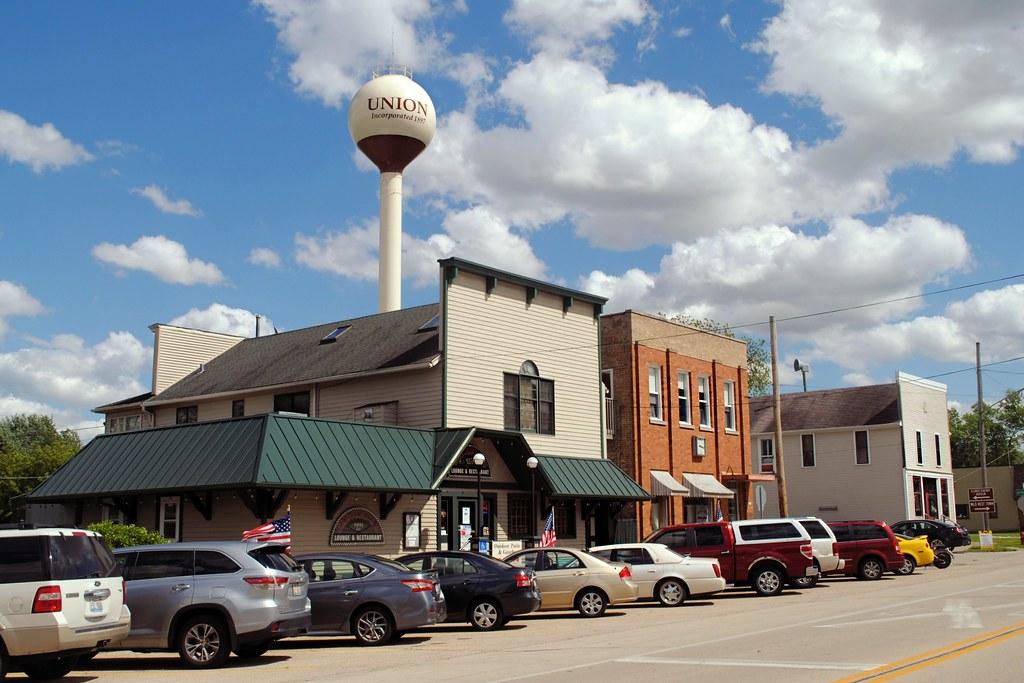
- Downtown Union

- Location in McHenry County, Illinois
- Coordinates: 42°13′54″N 88°32′41″W
- Country: United States
- State: Illinois
- County: McHenry
- Township: Coral

Area
  - Total: 0.84 sq mi (2.17 km^{2})
  - Land: 0.84 sq mi (2.17 km^{2})
  - Water: 0 sq mi (0.00 km^{2})
- Elevation: 856 ft (261 m)

Population (2020)
  - Total: 551
  - Density: 658.8/sq mi (254.36/km^{2})
- Time zone: UTC-6 (CST)
  - Summer (DST): UTC-5 (CDT)
- ZIP code: 60180
- Area code: 815
- FIPS code: 17-76706
- GNIS feature ID: 2400020
- Website: unionillinois.org

Union is a village in McHenry County, Illinois, United States. The population was 551 at the 2020 census.

== History ==
A post office called Union has been in operation since 1852. The village was named for the federal union of the United States.

== Geography ==
According to the U.S. Census Bureau, Union has a total area of 0.84 square miles (2.18 km^{2}), all land. The village drains to the north toward the South Branch of the Kishwaukee River, part of the Rock River watershed.

== Demographics ==
Historical population
Census	Pop.	Note	%±
1880	156		—
1900	322		—
1910	432		34.2%
1920	399		−7.6%
1930	367		−8.0%
1940	327		−10.9%
1950	435		33.0%
1960	480		10.3%
1970	579		20.6%
1980	622		7.4%
1990	542		−12.9%
2000	576		6.3%
2010	580		0.7%
2020	551		−5.0%
U.S. Decennial Census

=== 2000 census ===
At the 2000 census there were 576 people, 204 households, and 158 families living in the village. The population density was 950.4 inhabitants per square mile (367.0/km^{2}). There were 208 housing units at an average density of 343.2 per square mile (132.5/km^{2}). The racial makeup of the village was 98.09% White, 0.35% Native American, 0.87% from other races, and 0.69% from two or more races. Hispanic or Latino of any race were 3.99%.

Of the 204 households 37.7% had children under the age of 18 living with them, 63.7% were married couples living together, 9.3% had a female householder with no husband present, and 22.5% were non-families. 15.7% of households were one person and 6.4% were one person aged 65 or older. The average household size was 2.82 and the average family size was 3.15.

The age distribution was 28.0% under the age of 18, 7.5% from 18 to 24, 34.2% from 25 to 44, 19.3% from 45 to 64, and 11.1% 65 or older. The median age was 36 years. For every 100 females, there were 92.6 males. For every 100 females age 18 and over, there were 97.6 males.

The median household income was $56,528 and the median family income was $57,500. Males had a median income of $38,393 versus $25,536 for females. The per capita income for the village was $21,218. About 5.8% of families and 5.2% of the population were below the poverty line, including 2.9% of those under age 18 and 16.7% of those age 65 or over.

=== 2020 census ===
Union village, Illinois – Racial and ethnic composition Note: the US Census treats Hispanic/Latino as an ethnic category. This table excludes Latinos from the racial categories and assigns them to a separate category. Hispanics/Latinos may be of any race.
Race / Ethnicity (NH = Non-Hispanic)	Pop 2000	Pop 2010	Pop 2020	% 2000	% 2010	% 2020
White alone (NH)	550	542	481	95.49%	93.45%	87.30%
Black or African American alone (NH)	0	4	0	0.00%	0.69%	0.00%
Native American or Alaska Native alone (NH)	1	1	0	0.17%	0.17%	0.00%
Asian alone (NH)	0	6	6	0.00%	1.03%	1.09%
Pacific Islander alone (NH)	0	0	0	0.00%	0.00%	0.00%
Other race alone (NH)	0	0	0	0.00%	0.00%	0.00%
Mixed race or Multiracial (NH)	2	4	16	0.35%	0.69%	2.90%
Hispanic or Latino (any race)	23	23	48	3.99%	3.97%	8.71%
Total	576	580	551	100.00%	100.00%	100.00%

== Points of interest ==
Union was the site of the world's first fully automatic electrical substation, on the current site of the water tower just east of Main Street.

Union is home to the Illinois Railway Museum and the McHenry County Historical Society. It was formerly the home of Donley's Wild West Town amusement park, now closed.

== Notable person ==
- Red Kelly, right fielder for the Chicago White Sox; born in Union

== Media ==
The Marengo-Union Times is the newspaper of record in Union; it has a circulation of 6,300 and is mailed to every home and business in the greater Marengo and Union area. For cable television, Union is served by Charter Communications instead of Comcast, like the rest of the Chicago Metropolitan Area.

== See also ==
- List of municipalities in Illinois
