= Chicago and North Western 1385 =

Preserved American 4-6-0 locomotive

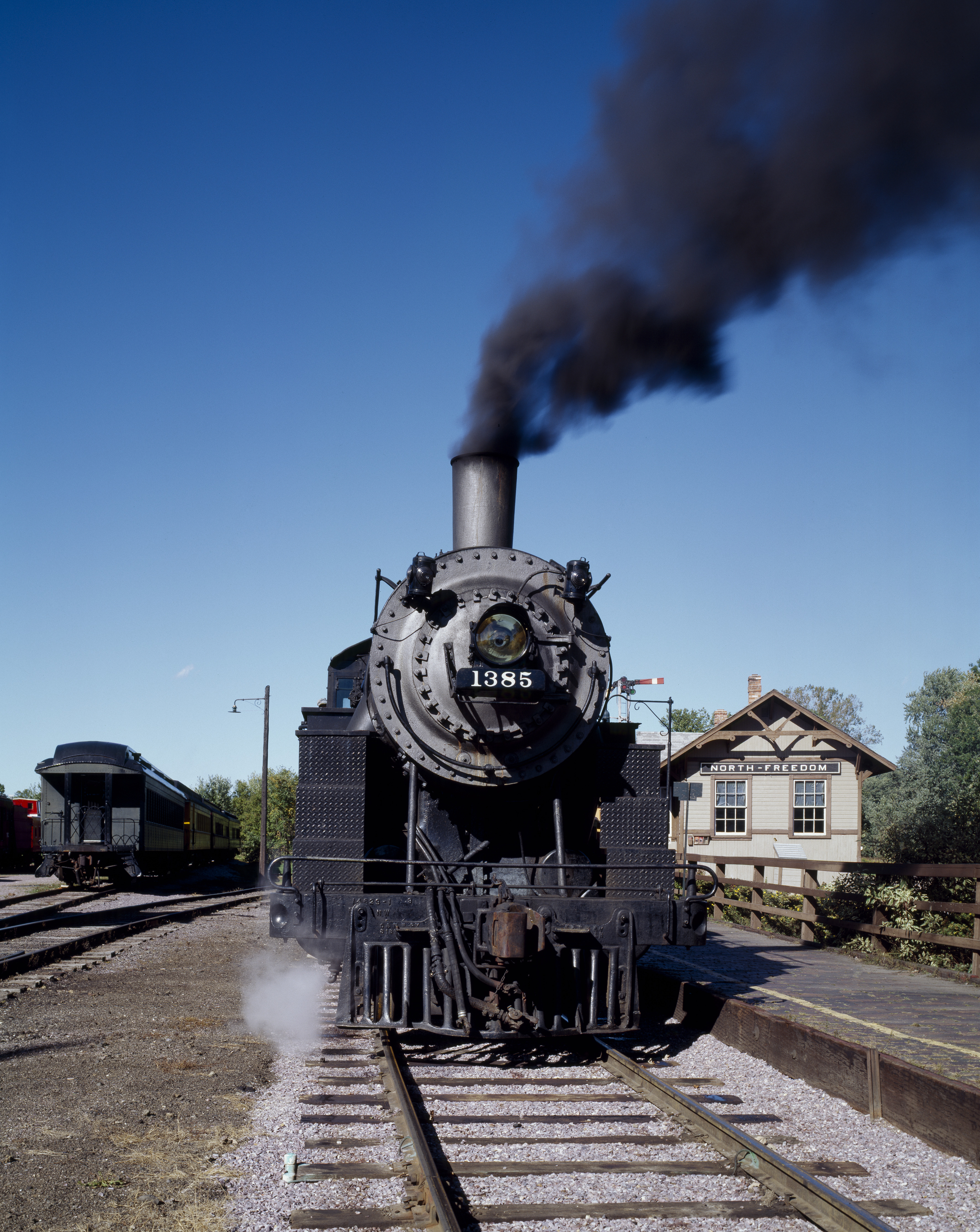
- No. 1385 waiting to depart North Freedom, Wisconsin in the 1990s
Type and origin
- Power type: Steam
- Builder: American Locomotive Company
- Serial number: 42187
- Build date: March 1907
Specifications
- Configuration
  - Whyte: 4-6-0
  - UIC: 2′C n2
- Gauge: 4 ft 8 1/2 in (1,435 mm)
- Trucks: Truck No. 3
- Leading dia.: 30 in (0.762 m)
- Driver dia.: 63 in (1.600 m)
- Tender wheels: 33 in (0.838 m)
- Minimum curve: 301 ft (92 m) radius/ 19°
- Wheelbase
  - Engine: 25 ft 10 in (7.87 m)
  - Leading: 6 ft 4 in (1.93 m)
  - Drivers: 14 ft 10 in (4.52 m)
- Height: 14 ft 11 5/8 in (4.56 m)
- Adhesive weight: 126,000 lb (57,000 kg)
- Loco weight: 162,500 lb (73,700 kg)
- Tender weight: 140,000 lb (64,000 kg); 61,500 lb (27,900 kg) (1973-1998)
- Total weight: 302,500 pounds (137.2 t)
- Fuel type: Coal
- Fuel capacity: 10 tonnes (9.8 long tons; 11.0 short tons); 9 tonnes (8.9 long tons; 9.9 short tons) (1973-1998)
- Water cap.: 7,500 US gal (28,000 L; 6,200 imp gal); 5,400 US gal (20,000 L; 4,500 imp gal) (1973-1998)
- Firebox
  - Type: Radial stay (round-top)
  - Grate area: 46.27 sq ft (4.299 m^{2}) (102 in × 65 1/4 in or 2.591 m × 1.657 m)
- Boiler
  - Diameter: 66 1/4 in (1.683 m)
  - Small tubes: 2 in (51 mm)
  - Large tubes: 5 3/8 in (137 mm)
- Boiler pressure: 200 psi (1,400 kPa)
- Heating surface
  - Firebox: 152.00 sq ft (14.121 m^{2})
  - Tubes and flues: 2,822.00 sq ft (262.172 m^{2})
  - Total surface: 2,974.00 sq ft (276.294 m^{2})
- Cylinders: Two, outside
- Cylinder size: 21 in × 26 in (533 mm × 660 mm)
- Valve gear: Stephenson
- Valve type: Piston valves
- Loco brake: Air
- Train brakes: Air
- Couplers: Knuckle
Performance figures
- Tractive effort: 30,900 lbf (137.5 kN)
- Factor of adh.: 4.08
Career
- Operators: Chicago and North Western Railway; Mid-Continent Railway Museum
- Class: R-1
- Numbers: C&NW 1385; DLW 1053
- Retired: 1956 (revenue service); June 30, 1998 (excursion service)
- Restored: May 27, 1963 (1st excursion service)
- Current owner: Mid-Continent Railway Museum
- Disposition: Undergoing restoration to operating condition
- Steam Locomotive #1385
- U.S. National Register of Historic Places
- Location within Wisconsin Location within the United States
- Location: E8948 Diamond Hill Rd., North Freedom, Wisconsin
- Coordinates: 43°27′31″N 89°52′29″W
- Area: less than one acre
- NRHP reference No.: 00000524
- Added to NRHP: May 18, 2000

Chicago and North Western 1385 is an R-1 class 4-6-0 "Ten-Wheeler" type steam locomotive owned by the Mid-Continent Railway Museum (MCRY). Built by the American Locomotive Company (ALCO) in March 1907, the locomotive was one of 325 R-1s to be built for the Chicago and North Western Railway (CN&W) throughout the 1900s. The R-1s were among the most reliable classes of steam locomotives the C&NW rostered, and they could travel all across their network and serve various purposes, such as freight locomotives, passenger locomotives and switchers.

No. 1385 was mainly used to pull freight trains until 1956, when it was retired from the C&NW's roster, but it was briefly used as a stationary boiler for a short period afterward. In 1961, the original members of the MCRY purchased No. 1385 for $2,600 scrap value, and the locomotive was moved to the museum's original location in Hillsboro, Wisconsin. In 1963, No. 1385 was moved again to the MCRY's current location in North Freedom, Wisconsin, and the R-1 locomotive began pulling tourist trains between North Freedom and the end of the MCRY's line at a disused quartzite quarry.

In 1981, the C&NW was exploring public relations options before they reached an agreement with the MCRY to lease and operate No. 1385 for their steam program. The first train of the program, which was a promotion of the C&NW's rolling stock upgrades, took place in May 1982. From 1985 to 1987, No. 1385 pulled the Circus World Museum train between Baraboo and Milwaukee, for the annual circus parade events. By 1988, the C&NW's steam program was discontinued, due to liability insurance issues. No. 1385 continued to run on MCRY's trackage, and it also pulled some mainline excursion trains on other nearby railroads, such as the Wisconsin and Southern.

In 1998, No. 1385 was removed from service, since it was due for boiler and running gear repairs. Repairs were subsequently halted, due to a lack of funding, and No. 1385 was stored while the MCRY focused on other priorities. In 2011, the MCRY began to perform a complete rebuild on No. 1385, using a portion of a matching grant the museum received. SPEC Machine was hired to perform most of the repairs on the locomotive. As of 2026, No. 1385's rebuild is nearly completed, and it is scheduled to return to service sometime within the year.

== Design and abilities ==
Throughout the 1890s, the Chicago and North Western Railroad (C&NW) experimented with different firebox designs to upgrade their steam locomotive roster. In 1899, it created a new boiler design with a 56-inch (1,400 mm) firebox that would sit above the rear driving wheels, and it came with a working pressure of 200 psi (1,400 kPa). After testing the new boiler on its D Class 4-4-2 "Atlantics" the following year, the C&NW designed the R-1 class 4-6-0 "ten-wheeler" locomotive; it would be equipped with 63-inch (1,600 mm) diameter driving wheels and 21-by-26-inch (530 mm × 660 mm) cylinders, and it would be capable of producing a tractive effort of 30,900 pounds-force (137 kN).

While the R-1s were being developed, freight and passenger traffic began to constantly grow for various railroads, including the C&NW. Beginning in 1901, the C&NW ordered and received R-1 class 4-6-0s from the American Locomotive Company's (ALCO) Schenectady works and the Baldwin Locomotive Works. The first R-1s were originally built with cast iron materials, Stephenson valve gear motion with four-bar crosshead guides, and a small tender capacity of 5,400 U.S. gallons (20,441 L) of water and 9 tonnes (8.9 long tons; 9.9 short tons) of coal. They were so large and heavy that their route availabilities were drastically limited, and the C&NW had to restructure their trackage, bridges, and roundhouse stalls to accommodate them. The restructuring process was later completed in 1939, and the locomotives were able to travel all across the railway's network.

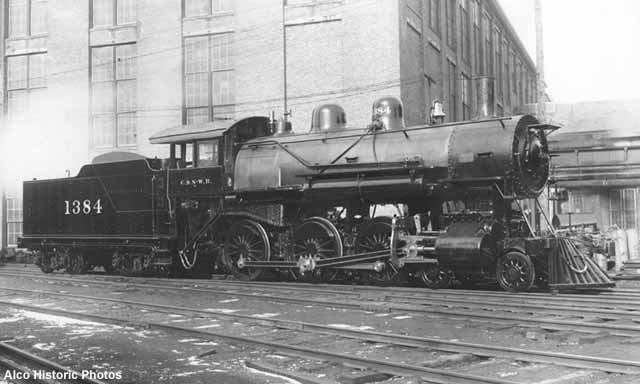
Builder's photograph of C&NW No. 1384, which was part of the same batch of R-1s as No. 1385, March 1907

In 1902, the R-1 design was upgraded with steel materials and alligator crosshead guides, and the changes were applied to all R-1s built afterward. In 1905, the tender design was also upgraded to carry 7,500 U.S. gallons (28,391 L) of water and 10 tonnes (9.8 long tons; 11.0 short tons) of coal. The final major modification applied to the R-1s during their construction was the application of Walschaerts valve gear; 40 of the final 65 locomotives built in 1907 and 1908 were applied with Walschaerts instead of Stephenson. After the final orders were completed in 1908, the C&NW had rostered 325 R-1s, making them the most manufactured class of steam locomotives on the railroad.

The large size and tractive effort of the R-1s made them the most powerful locomotives on the C&NW until the introduction of the Z Class 2-8-0s in 1909. The R-1s were originally used as dual-service locomotives, being assigned to pull mainline passenger and freight trains in Wisconsin. After 1920, the R-1s were mostly relegated to branch line and switching services. Some of them were modified with steam heating equipment to continue pulling passenger trains, including the connecting section of the Flambeau 400 and the C&NW's commuter services around Chicago.

== History ==
=== Revenue service ===
No. 1385 was one of twenty-five R-1s to be built by ALCO in March 1907—the first of four batches of R-1s to be built throughout that year. The locomotive was mostly assigned by the C&NW to work within the Lake Shore Division, which consisted of routes that led to iron ore mines in the Upper Peninsula of Michigan. In March 1931, No. 1385 was sent to Ashland, Wisconsin, to be rebuilt with a superheater; a modification that the C&NW had applied to most of the R-1s since 1915. No. 1385's last commercial assignment on the railroad was to serve as a yard switcher at Iron Mountain, Michigan, before it was taken out of service in 1956, when the C&NW completely dieselized their locomotive roster.

Since it still had serviceable flues in its boiler, No. 1385 was towed to Green Bay, Wisconsin, where it was used as a stationary boiler at a C&NW-owned freight house. In early 1959, the R-1 was towed again to Escanaba, where its boiler was used to thaw frozen iron ore. No. 1385 was also retained as a backup for steam heating passenger trains. By 1961, with the C&NW acquiring electric generator cars, No. 1385's steam heating capabilities were deemed obsolete. By that time, No. 1385 was one of only two R-1 locomotives remaining under C&NW's possession, with the other being No. 175, and the company wanted to sell them both off.

=== Early preservation years ===
In 1960, members of the Railway Historical Society of Milwaukee, Wisconsin, entered negotiations with the C&NW about acquiring one of the two R-1s. The Historical Society decided that buying the still-operable No. 1385 locomotive was the better option, since the railroad offered to sell it for its scrap value of $2,600, while they asked for more money for No. 175. To raise funds, the Society formed the Enginemen's Operating Club; each member would be asked to loan $100 to the society for two years, and any contributor would be rewarded with privileges to operate No. 1385.

Twenty-nine members contributed to the Historical Society's needs, and they purchased No. 1385 from the C&NW on November 24, 1961. Simultaneously, the Historical Society reached an agreement with the Hillsboro and Northeastern Railway (H&NE) to have their collection relocated to Hillsboro, and the group changed its name to the Mid-Continent Railway Museum (MCRY). In early 1962, No. 1385 was moved from Escanaba to Hillsboro, and it was repainted for display. On May 26, the museum hosted its grand opening ceremony, and a celebration train operated between Hillsboro and the C&NW-H&NE interchange at Union Center.

No. 1385 was scheduled to pull the celebration train, but shortly beforehand, inspectors from the Interstate Commerce Commission (ICC) had ruled the R-1 would be unsafe to run unless necessary repairs were made, so it was left on display while an H&NE diesel locomotive had to pull the train. By the end of 1962, the MCRY decided to relocate their collection again. Simultaneously, the C&NW obtained permission to abandon their Rattlesnake Line, a 4.2-mile (7 km) branch line that lies between North Freedom and a quartzite quarry near Rattlesnake. The MCRY bought the Rattlesnake Line from the railroad on May 17, 1963, and after the museum performed some minor repairs on No. 1385, the locomotive began operating for their first excursion season on the branch on May 27.

By the end of 1963, No. 1385 began experiencing boiler problems, so it was removed from service while the MCRY's trains continued to be hauled by other locomotives. In the early 1970s, work began to return the R-1 to active service. During the process, No. 1385's original tender, which held a capacity of 7,500 U.S. gallons (28,391 L) of water and 10 tonnes (9.8 long tons; 11.0 short tons) of coal, was found to be in poor condition, so the MCRY searched for a replacement. In 1972, the museum purchased a smaller tender (No. X-263579) from the C&NW; it had been paired with an older R-1, holding a capacity of 5,400 U.S. gallons (20,441 L) of water and 9 tonnes (8.9 long tons; 9.9 short tons) of coal.

No. 1385 returned to service for the MCRY on July 29, 1973, and it would be paired with the smaller tender for the next several years. A decision was also made to reduce the R-1's boiler pressure from 200 psi (1,379 kPa) to 150 psi (1,034 kPa) for the tourist operations. As the museum acquired and leased other steam locomotives, including Dardanelle and Russellville No. 9 and Western Coal and Coke No. 1, No. 1385 would swap places with them as it rotated in and out of service.

=== Chicago and North Western steam program ===
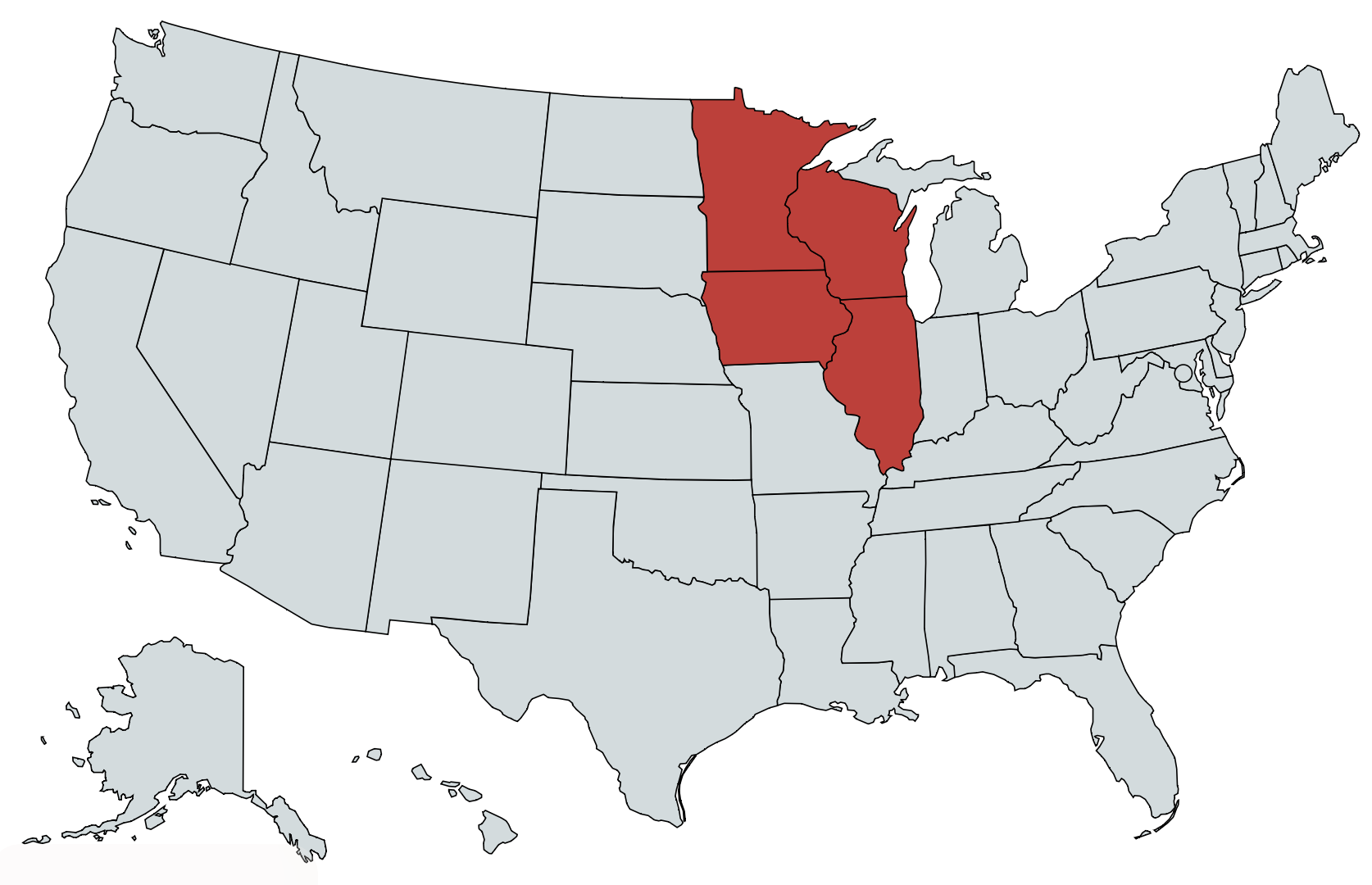
US states visited by No. 1385 in excursion service

By July 1981, the bankruptcy of the Milwaukee Road generated public relations issues for other railroads within the Upper Midwest, and C&NW management explored ways to publicize their company's healthy operations. Chris Burger, the manager of the C&NW's Wisconsin Division, proposed an idea of a steam program to James A. Zito, the railroad's vice president of operations, and James R. Wolfe, the railroad's president. (Note: The idea of a steam program started during a pitch meeting between Burger and Zito in Chicago, when Burger noticed a photograph of railroaders posing in front of C&NW 4-6-2 locomotive No. 1544, and he asked Zito about it. Zito replied it was a graduation shot of his father's engineer training class.) Burger felt No. 1385 would be the ideal locomotive for the program. While Wolfe envisioned the benefits, he felt the company couldn't afford to host a full-blown program with the state of the economy at the time. Burger then proposed a limited operation on the Wisconsin Division during the 1982 National Transportation Week, which Zito and Wolfe approved.

Burger approached the MCRY's board of directors about the C&NW leasing No. 1385 for the event, and he requested the Federal Railroad Administration (FRA) to inspect the R-1 for eligibility to operate on the mainline. The MCRY board approved the lease, and the FRA gave their approval, but they stated that the running gear required repairs, first. Since such repairs required a drop pit, Burger contacted the C&NW's repair facility in Green Bay, where railroaders with steam experience, including motive power foreman Al Kawalek, were still employed. To prepare No. 1385 for long distance operations, MCRY crews extended the coal boards on the tender for extra coal capacity, they paired the locomotive with a Milwaukee Road auxiliary car for extra water capacity, and they installed a multiple-unit device to control diesel locomotives. The R-1 left North Freedom for a two-day run to Green Bay on April 9, 1982, and the journey was unannounced to avoid attracting public attention. After it arrived in Green Bay, Kawalek's volunteer crews used a drop pit to remove the driving wheels and axle boxes from the locomotive for reworking, and they performed some minor repairs on the tender. On May 11, No. 1385 performed a test run northward to Oconto, where it subsequently met a southbound C&NW inspection train, led by EMD F7 diesels and hosted by the railroad's Vice President of Transportation, Edward Burkhardt. Upon arrival in Oconto, the F7s broke down, and Burger arranged to have No. 1385 pull the inspection train to Green Bay, with Burkhardt serving as the engineer.

On May 15, the 1982 National Transportation Week began, and No. 1385 was displayed with the Prosperity Special train in Green Bay for the Chicago and North Western Historical Society (C&NWHS) convention. (Note: The name Prosperity Special was a nod to the 1922 delivery train of the same name, where twenty Baldwin 2-10-2s were delivered to the Southern Pacific Railroad en masse.) The train, consisting of an EMD GP50 diesel, six modern freight cars, a caboose, and two business cars, was created as a public message that the railroad was investing in new equipment, despite the ongoing recession. On May 16, No. 1385 pulled the Prosperity Special from Green Bay to Milwaukee, but en route, No. 1385 briefly stalled from the multiple-unit device controlling the GP50. After being displayed at Butler Yard in the Milwaukee area, the Prosperity Special traveled to Chicago, Janesville and Madison for additional display stops, before the operation ended in North Freedom, on May 25.

Following the success of the Prosperity Special, and at the request of C&NW Iowa Division manager George Maybee, No. 1385 pulled some public excursions out of Boone and over the Kate Shelley High Bridge, during the annual Pufferbilly Days event in September; it was coupled to two C&NW F7s and three bilevel passenger cars on loan from Metra. Following the Pufferbilly Days event, Wolfe and other C&NW management approved to launch a full-blown steam program, with Burkhardt providing financial support for it. On December 17, the C&NW signed an agreement with the MCRY to lease No. 1385 for the next four years.

After traveling from Boone to Chicago for display at Madison Street Station, No. 1385 was returned to Green Bay to undergo an FRA-mandated overhaul. Kawalek's volunteer crews removed the tubes and piping from the boiler, but due to a lack of available replacement tubes, No. 1385 was shipped on December 13, to the Milwaukee Boiler Manufacturing Company. In Milwaukee, crews replaced part of the rear tube sheet and placed a patch on the boiler. In early May 1983, the R-1 was returned to Green Bay for reassembly, and on May 30, No. 1385 traveled to Butler Yard. In Butler, Chamber of Commerce President Jerry Hilton arranged for the locomotive to pull Butler 400 excursion trips for the Butler Railroad Days event, and No. 1385 carried over 4,500 passengers during the occasion.

In the ensuing years, the C&NW would help groups raise funds by making No. 1385-led trips available for them to sponsor. No. 1385 would travel across other portions of the railroad's network, traveling as far west as Council Bluffs, Iowa, as far south as Des Moines, and as far north as Duluth, Minnesota and Escanaba. The locomotive also ran along routes in Iowa the C&NW had acquired from other companies, such as the Chicago Great Western (CGW), the Minneapolis and St. Louis (M&StL), and the Rock Island (RI). With C&NW trackage rights, the locomotive traveled on the Milwaukee Road to Winona, and the Burlington Northern (BN) to Superior.

In 1985, following a twelve-year hiatus, the Circus World Museum (CWM) of Baraboo, Wisconsin, hosted the annual circus parade in Milwaukee, and No. 1385 was arranged to lead the CWM's Great Circus Train on the C&NW main line on July 10. For 1986, the C&NW created a full schedule of trains for No. 1385 to pull, including some fundraising trips for the MCRY. That same year, an insurance crisis broke out within the railroad industry, causing premium prices to rise up, and most of C&NW's scheduled 1986 trips had to be cancelled. No. 1385 only led three trains that year; a C&NW employee open house in May, that year's Great Circus Train on July 8, and the Pufferbilly Days special in September.

On July 7, 1987, No. 1385 was tasked to lead that year's Great Circus Train, but as it began to depart Baraboo, the R-1 suffered a superheater failure and sputtered. While the train moved on behind an EMD SD60 diesel, No. 1385 was returned to the MCRY, where the failure was traced to a faulty bolt, and the entire superheater was repaired by volunteers in twelve hours. The repairs were documented by a television crew from Milwaukee. At midnight, No. 1385 was towed to Janesville to catch up with the CWM train, and then the train arrived in Milwaukee on schedule. After the event, No. 1385 ran to Chicago for display at Madison Street Station, during the sesquicentennial of the city.

While the MCRY continued to keep No. 1385 in working order, the insurance crisis caused the C&NW to undergo several changes; routes continued to be abandoned and sold off, divisions were consolidated, and employees were laid off. The C&NW's management also changed in the years after 1986; Burkhardt left to create Wisconsin Central (WC), Wolfe died of cancer, Zito retired from the railroad, and Burger left to work for Central Vermont (CV). The railroad's newer president, Robert Schmiege, felt the steam operations reinforced the perception of railroads being obsolete, and by 1988, the C&NW's steam program officially ended. Using No. 1385 to lead the 1988 Great Circus Train was also decided against, due to that summer's dry weather conditions.

=== Final years of 20th-century operations ===
With No. 1385 without a host, but still FRA-certified for mainline service, the MCRY looked into running the R-1 on other railroads while helping communities that still desired to sponsor steam excursions. On October 11, 1987, as part of MCRY's annual Fall Color Weekend event, No. 1385 was paired with C&NW EMD GP7 No. 1518, which was borrowed from the Illinois Railway Museum for the occasion. In late October and early November, No. 1385 pulled three weekend excursions on the Wisconsin and Calumet (WICT), and the trips were sponsored by the Broadhead Historical Society, Jaycees, and Lions Club.

During that time, on November 4, the WICT borrowed No. 1385 to assist GP7 No. 616 in pulling a grain train from Waukesha to McFarland. After returning to North Freedom, the R-1 underwent some major boiler repairs, and a new smokebox was fabricated. No. 1385 subsequently returned to WICT to pull yearly fall excursions on the railroad in 1988, 1989, and 1990. On March 10, 1989, No. 1385 was redecorated to pull a recreation of the Abraham Lincoln Funeral train on the Chicago-Chemung Railroad between Harvard and Chemung, Illinois, and it was filmed for a television commercial for the Illinois Department of Tourism. Throughout 1991, the R-1 remained in North Freedom to receive additional boiler repairs; scale was cleaned out, and old boiler tubes were replaced.

In June and July 1992, the MCRY operated No. 1385 on a 1,000-mile (1,600 km) tour over the Wisconsin and Southern (WSOR) and the WC. On the WSOR, No. 1385 pulled freight trains between Horicon, Cambria, and Oshkosh, and on the WC, it pulled public excursions between Wausau and Merrill. During the Fourth of July weekend, the locomotive pulled excursions on the WSOR from Horicon to Brown Deer in the Milwaukee area. After having hauled over 8,600 passengers on the WSOR and WC, No. 1385 returned to North Freedom on July 6, and an ALCO C415 locomotive was in tow for donation to the MCRY.

In July 1993, during that year's National Railway Historical Society (NRHS) Convention, No. 1385 was scheduled to pull a Mid-Continent 400 excursion to LaSalle Street Station in Chicago, where passengers were to be transferred from a Metra train to the excursion for a ride on the WSOR to Janesville. That year's Great Flood landlocked the MCRY, as their interchange with the C&NW at North Freedom was flooded by heavy rain. As a result, convention officials cancelled the Mid-Continent 400 trip, and No. 1385 was used to move ballast cars.

In 1994, after No. 1385 pulled the MCRY's annual Snow Train, it was discovered that the locomotive's left front driving wheel had slightly moved inward on its axle. Consequently, No. 1385's driving wheels all had to be removed for repairs. The wheels were shipped to Norfolk Southern's workshop in Irondale, Alabama, where many cracks were discovered under the layers of black paint, so they had to be thoroughly rewelded. Repairs on the running gear took over 1,000 hours of volunteer labor and cost $60,000 to complete. By September 12, the wheels were returned to North Freedom and reinstalled on the R-1, and No. 1385 returned to service again on October 2.

That same day, the locomotive was repainted as Delaware, Lackawanna and Western (DLW) No. 1053 to be filmed with the museum's authentic DLW passenger cars for Steam and Steel, a documentary film that was scheduled to be shown at Steamtown National Historic Site in Scranton, Pennsylvania. In the spring of 1995, the C&NWHS hosted their annual meeting at the MCRY, with No. 1385 performing some photo run-bys for the event. By 1997, No. 1385 was close to being due for additional boiler and firebox repairs, and since the R-1 and Saginaw Timber No. 2 were the only operational steam locomotives left at the MCRY, the museum launched the Help Steam Live fundraising campaign. On June 30, 1998, No. 1385 was removed from service to undergo the required repairs.

=== 21st-century hiatus and renovation ===
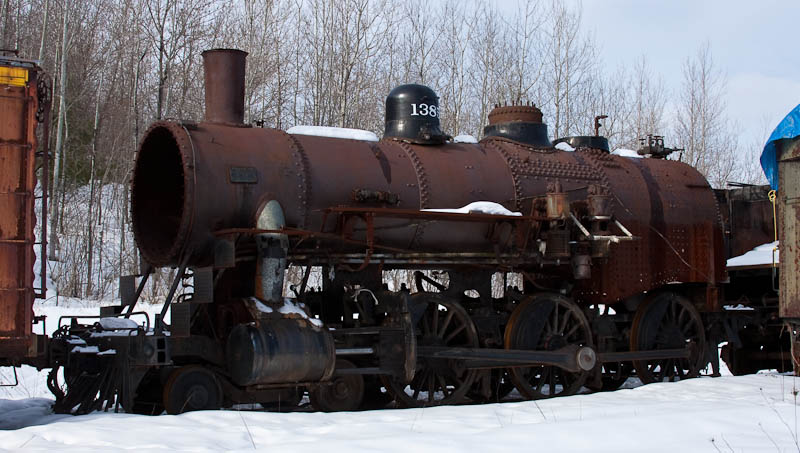
No. 1385 sitting in storage, disassembled, on February 6, 2010

On May 18, 2000, No. 1385 became listed on the National Register of Historic Places. Without an operable steam locomotive, yearly visitor attendance at the MCRY plummeted, so museum officials planned to revive steam operations to lure visitors back. They initially estimated that boiler repairs on No. 1385 would cost $125,000 to complete, but a closer inspection revealed that the locomotive would require a complete $750,000 rebuild to operate again, and it was discovered that No. 1385's boiler was corroded beyond repair. The project was subsequently stalled by varying challenges, including the Great Recession, and a 2008 flood that damaged the museum's property, and the R-1 was stored on a siding for the time being.

In 2011, Wag-Aero co-founders Dick and Bobbie Wagner arranged for the Wagner Foundation to donate a $250,000 matching grant to the MCRY, and they promised to help further fund No. 1385's rebuild. It was re-estimated that the project would cost $2 million to complete, making it the MCRY's most expensive restoration project. The museum contracted SPEC Machine, owned by Steve Roudebush, to help restore the No. 1385 locomotive. By 2013, No. 1385's original 7,500-U.S.-gallon (28,391 L) tender was thoroughly rebuilt. That same year, after the locomotive was disassembled, the frame and running gear were shipped to SPEC's rural machine shop in Middleton. Afterward, the frame of the front pilot truck was replaced, and the driving wheels were sent to be repaired at the Strasburg Rail Road's restoration shop in Pennsylvania, before returning to Middleton.

Progress on the project required some tools to be custom made, and several old photos, books, encyclopedias and blueprints were used as references. No. 1385's wooden cab was sent to Fond du Lac, where it served as a reference for a replacement cab to be built. In 2016, construction on a new welded boiler for the R-1 began by Continental Fabricators in St. Louis, Missouri, which helped construct boilers for other steam locomotives, including Pennsylvania Railroad 5550. In 2017, the frame and running gear were moved out of SPEC's shop and into a larger adjacent building, which was built specifically to house No. 1385 for the remainder of its rebuild. In September 2019, the new boiler was moved to Middleton and fitted onto the frame. Following the lockdowns during the COVID-19 pandemic, work on the locomotive continued at a slower pace, but Roudebush set the project as a high priority.

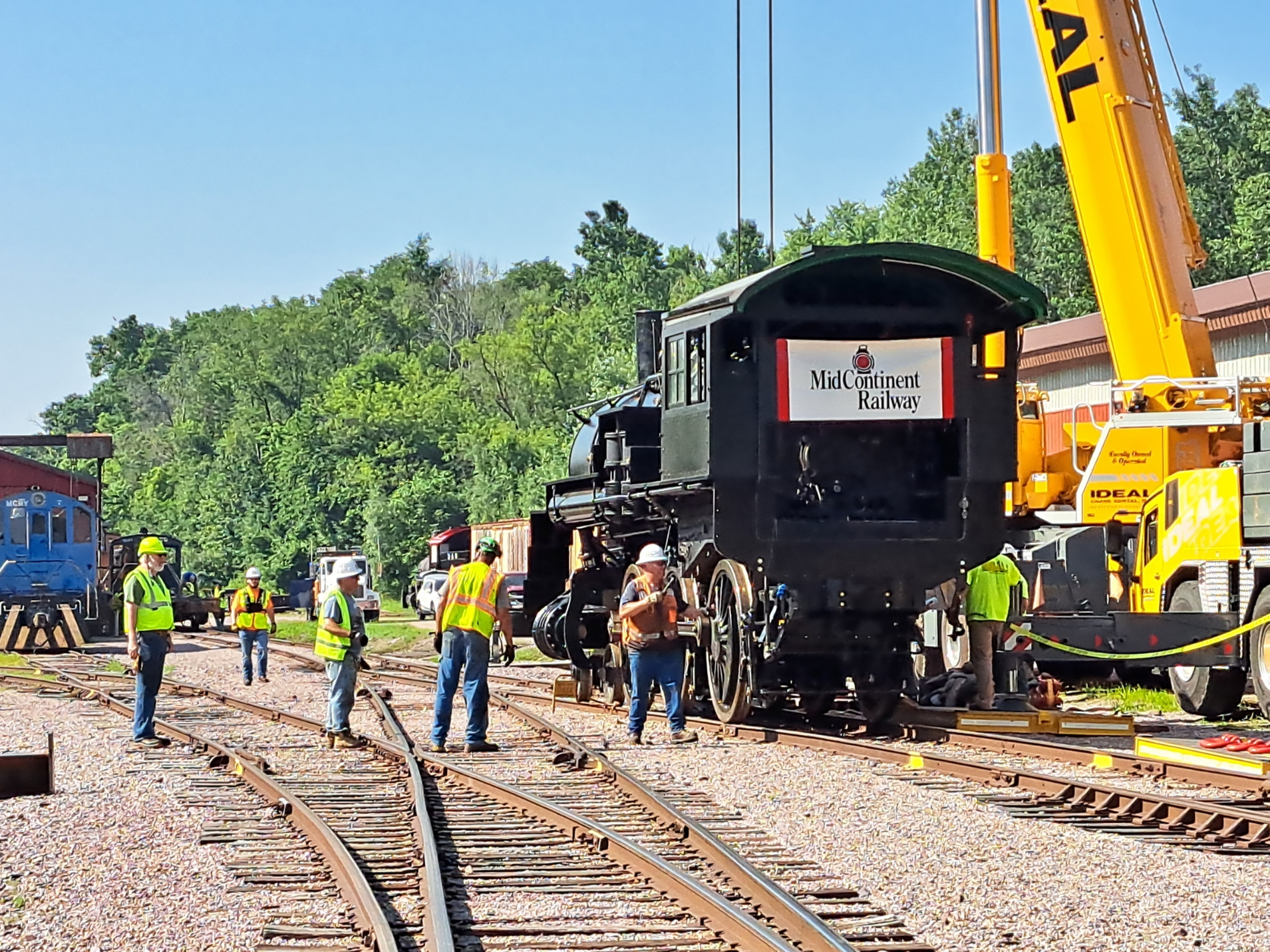
CN&W 1385 being returned to the MCRY's rails on July 14, 2025

In February 2025, the MCRY launched a fundraising campaign to raise $80,000 to return No. 1385 to North Freedom. Five months later, in mid-July, No. 1385 was shipped via semi-truck to a small yard in Middleton, and then it was shipped via WSOR flatcar back to the MCRY. (Note: The move was originally scheduled to occur in May, but it was postponed by two months, when a trucking firm withdrew their contract, and the MCRY had to hire a replacement.) The museum then launched another campaign to raise $300,000 for the final tasks of the R-1's restoration: the installation of replacement pistons, the valve gear, and the boiler jacketing. On December 4 and 5, No. 1385 underwent a successful stationary test fire. The museum scheduled for No. 1385 to return to service sometime in 2026.

== See also ==
- Soo Line 2645
- Soo Line 2719
- Southern Railway 4501
- Nickel Plate Road 587
- Norfolk and Western 475

== Bibliography ==
- "1385: A Pictorial". North Western Lines. Winter 1995. pp. 69–79.
- Burger, Chris (Fall 2021). "The little charmer, the Steam Queen, and the big top". Classic Trains. Vol. 22, no. 3. Kalmbach Media. pp. 16–23.
- Follmar, Joseph; Jorgensen, Raymond (Winter 1995). "Locomotives That Changed the C&NW: The Class R-1 Ten-Wheelers". North Western Lines. pp. 45–63.
- Glischinski, Steve (December 1993). "The life and times of a Ten-Wheeler". Trains. Vol. 53, no. 12. Kalmbach Media. pp. 45–51.
- Jorg, Ray (Winter 1995). "C&NW R-1 Disposition List". North Western Lines. pp. 64–67.
- McGonigal, Robert (November 1993). "A tasty mix in the railroad capital". Trains. Vol. 53, no. 11. Kalmbach Media. pp. 29–31.
- Nelson, Bruce (2013). America's Greatest Circus Train (1st ed.). Heimburger House Publishing Company. ISBN 978-0-911581-64-5.
- Swanson, Paul (October 1987). "Heroics at North Freedom". Trains. Vol. 47, no. 12. Kalmbach Media. pp. 18–19.
- Yarger, Bob (November–December 1995). "Chicago & North Western No. 1385". Locomotive & Railway Preservation. No. 56. Pentrex. pp. 17–20.
