= Western Coal and Coke 1 =

Preserved Canadian 4-6-0 locomotive

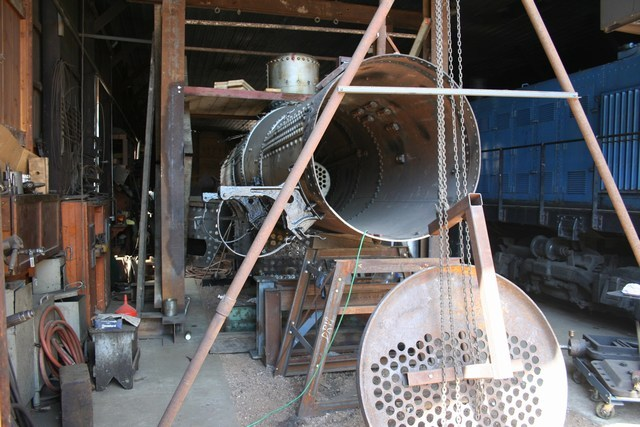
- WC&C No. 1's disassembled boiler inside the Mid-Continent Railway Museum's shops, December 13, 2008
Type and origin
- Power type: Steam
- Builder: Montreal Locomotive Works
- Serial number: 53632
- Build date: December 1913
Specifications
- Configuration
  - Whyte: 4-6-0
  - UIC: 2'C
- Gauge: 4 ft 8 1/2 in (1,435 mm)
- Driver dia.: 51 in (1,300 mm)
- Wheelbase: 47.56 ft (14.50 m)
  - Engine: 20.67 ft (6.30 m)
  - Drivers: 10.50 ft (3.20 m)
- Adhesive weight: 85,000 lb (39,000 kg)
- Loco weight: 111,000 lb (50,000 kg)
- Tender weight: 87,500 lb (39,700 kg)
- Total weight: 198,500 lb (90,000 kg)
- Fuel type: Coal
- Fuel capacity: 8.80 long tons (8.94 t)
- Water cap.: 4,200 US gal (16,000 L; 3,500 imp gal)
- Firebox
  - Grate area: 21.21 sq ft (1.970 m^{2})
- Boiler pressure: 160 psi (1,100 kPa)
- Heating surface
  - Firebox: 115 sq ft (10.7 m^{2})
- Cylinders: Two, outside
- Cylinder size: 18 in × 24 in (460 mm × 610 mm)
- Valve gear: Stephenson
Performance figures
- Power output: 3,394 PS (2,496 kW; 3,348 hp)
- Tractive effort: 20,736 lb (9,406 kg)
- Factor of adh.: 4.10
Career
- Operators: Western Coal and Coke Company; Lethbridge Collieries Ltd; Mid-Continent Railway Museum
- Class: WC&C Class 1
- Numbers: WC&C 1
- Retired: 1964 (revenue service); February 15, 1994 (excursion service)
- Restored: 1970
- Current owner: Mid-Continent Railway Museum
- Disposition: Disassembled, awaiting restoration

Western Coal and Coke Company No. 1 is a preserved Canadian 4-6-0 "Ten-Wheeler" type steam locomotive built by the Montreal Locomotive Works in 1913. It was originally built as part of a standard locomotive design with 1880's specifications, in order to help construct the Canadian National Transcontinental Railway. It was retired from revenue service in 1964, and it was subsequently purchased by the Mid-Continent Railway Museum, which subsequently used it to pull their tourist trains. As of 2026, it is undergoing restoration to operating condition.

== History ==
=== Development ===
Western Coal and Coke Company No. 1's design was first developed in the late 1880s by the Pittsburgh Locomotive Works. The early 4-6-0 design came with a straight boiler, and copies of the design were purchased by such American railroads as the Bessemer and Lake Erie, the Pittsburgh and Lake Erie, and the Duluth, Missabe and Northern. By the turn of the 20th century, though, as a result of larger and more modern locomotive designs being developed, the early Pittsburgh design became obsolete, and several of the remaining locomotives of the design became owned or leased by Canadian companies through equipment dealerships. When the third Transcontinental Railway across Canada was under construction, a small locomotive with low speed was needed to assist with the construction.

The early Pittsburgh design was subsequently redesigned with a larger firebox and superheated flues, which would create a higher boiler pressure and a greater tractive effort. The Montreal Locomotive Works (MLW) initially constructed fifteen locomotives of the 4-6-0 design for assistance of constructing the National Transcontinental Railway, but due to the success of the design, various Canadian railways and industrial companies subsequently ordered locomotives of the same design, in order to save designing and construction costs.

=== Revenue service ===
The Western Coal and Coke Company (WC&C), a coal company that served certain parts of Alberta, ordered one locomotive of this design from the MLW, which was built and delivered in December 1913, and it was numbered 1. No. 1 was initially assigned to pull coal trains on branchlines in and out of Beaver Mines, Alberta. The WC&C eventually changed its name to the Royalties Oil and Share Corporation, when it began transporting oil. In 1935, the corporation was merged with Lethbridge Collieries Limited, and although ownership of No. 1 was transferred, the locomotive retained its original roadnumber. It was subsequently reassigned to pull trains out of Plyami, Alberta. No. 1 was retired from revenue service in 1964, four years after commercial steam ended on both the Canadian National and Canadian Pacific Railways.

=== Preservation ===
In February 1965, No. 1 was purchased by Ray Buhrmaster and Stan Mailer, two members of the recently established Mid-Continent Railway Museum (MCRM). The locomotive was subsequently moved via flatcar to North Freedom, Wisconsin on October 30 of that year, and museum members and volunteers began working to restore the locomotive to operating condition with a renewed flue time. Restoration work was completed in 1970, and the locomotive replaced Louisiana Cypress No. 2 as one of the MCRM's operational tourist locomotives. No. 1 spent the next twenty-two years pulling four-mile tourist trains on the MCRM's former Chicago and North Western (C&NW) trackage between North Freedom and Rattlesnake Station near La Rue. In 1991, the locomotive's original wooden cab was replaced with a newly made one. However, on February 15, 1994, the locomotive was removed from service after experiencing some issues with its firebox. Museum crews subsequently inspected the locomotive, and it was discovered that No. 1's boiler needed to be reworked.

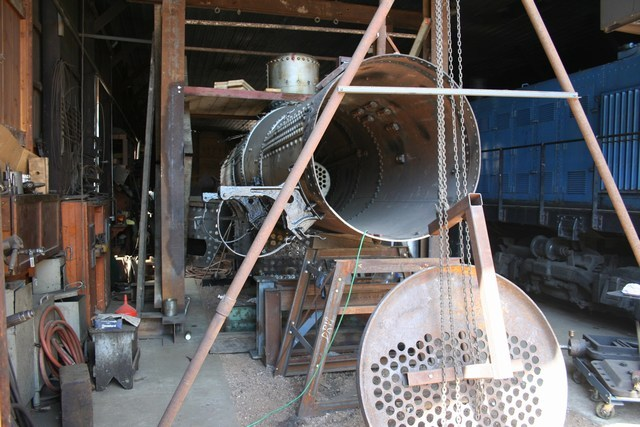
WC&C No. 1's disassembled boiler inside the Mid-Continent Railway Museum's shops, December 13, 2008

Museum crews subsequently spent the next decade repairing the locomotive's boiler, frame, and tender; in December 2003, crews began the process of replacing all of the studs in the boiler. In February 2004, the belly section beneath the boiler barrel was cut out to make way for a new patch of material. In May of that year, the centers of the driving wheels were tested for cracks using the Magnaflux process, and results detected a few cracks. In November, new patches were welded to the open belly section beneath the barrel. In late December, crews began constructing a replacement smokebox for No. 1. In March 2005, new replacement tubes were found that would be applied to No. 1's boiler. In November of that year, crews began creating a new front tube sheet from scratch, as a replacement for the old one. In February 2006, a replacement rear tube sheet was also beginning to be made. In December of that year, Museum employee Roger Hugg began to create a new replacement cowcatcher for No. 1 in his own shop at his home in Elroy. In January 2007, the driving wheels were sandblasted and trucked to DRM Industries in Madison to be primed before being shipped again to be repaired at the Tennessee Valley Railroad Museum (TVRM). In June of that year, a new pilot beam was fitted onto the frame. In September, work on the driving wheels was completed, and they were subsequently shipped back to North Freedom. In February 2008, work began at the TVRM to create a new rear firebox sheet for No. 1. In June of that year, however, the MCRM's property was inundated by floodwaters from the nearby Baraboo River, and the museum subsequently concentrated their efforts on repairing and reorganizing the damages while the rebuild on No. 1 was temporarily halted. As of 2025, restoration work on No. 1 is on hold, since MCRM crews are concentrating their efforts on rebuilding C&NW 4-6-0 No. 1385.

== See also ==
- Canadian National 1009
- Canadian National 89
- Canadian National 1392
- Canadian National 7470
- Soo Line 2645
- Chicago and North Western 175
