= Montana Western Railway =

Montana Western Railway may refer to:

- Montana Western Railway (1909–1970), Conrad to Valier
- Montana Western Railway (1986–2003), Butte to Garrison
