= NWX =

NWX, or nwx, may refer to:

- North Western Refrigerator Line, a defunct Chicago, Illinois-based private refrigerator car line
- nwx, the ISO 639-3 code for the Newar language in Middle Newar
- NWX, the National Rail code for New Cross railway station, London, England
