= North Western Refrigerator Line =

The North Western Refrigerator Line (NWX) was a Chicago, Illinois-based private refrigerator car line established in 1924, one of the last such companies to be formed. Between 1924 and 1940 the company acquired more than 3,000 new wood refrigerator cars originally built by the American Car and Foundry Company, and leased the former Ringling Brothers Circus railroad car plant in Baraboo, Wisconsin to serve as a car shop.

The NWX was closely allied with the Chicago and North Western Railway as several officials also held positions at the C&NW. In 1946 the North American Car Company purchased the NWX, though all cars continued to carry the NWX reporting marks. During the 1950s the fleet was rebuilt at North American's Green Bay, Hudson, and Baraboo facilities. North American closed the Baraboo shops in December 1963 as new mechanical reefers were being purchased, and refurbishment of wood cars was no longer required. By 1978, only 25 NWX cars were left in service. When North American was taken over by General Electric Railcar in 1984, the few remaining cars were stored, and dismantled soon thereafter.

Preserved NWX reefers #19769, #19781, and #19786 are on display at the Mid-Continent Railway Museum in North Freedom, Wisconsin.

North Western Refrigerator Line Roster, 1930–1960:

1930	1940	1950	1960
2,817	3,000*	3,398	2,460

*estimated

Source: The Great Yellow Fleet, p. 16.
