= Chester D. Seftenberg =

American politician

Chester D. Seftenberg (September 2, 1904 – June 7, 1970) was an American politician and the assistant deputy secretary of the United States Department of the Air Force from 1950 to 1953.

Born in North Freedom, Wisconsin, Seftenberg grew up in Oshkosh, Wisconsin and graduated from Oshkosh High School. He went to Oshkosh Normal School (now University of Wisconsin–Oshkosh) and then received his bachelor's degree from Lawrence University in 1926. Then he taught school and coached debate at Oshkosh High School. In 1927, Seftenberg served in the Wisconsin State Assembly and was a Republican. From 1928 to 1933, Seftenberg served as treasurer of the First Trust Company of Oshkosh. Then, Seftenberg served as vice president of the Oak Park Savings and Trust Bank in Oak Park, Illinois and was on the Oak Park zoning commission. During World War II, Seftenberg served in the United States Army Air Force with the rank of colonel. Seftenberg was vice president and trust officer of the First National American Bank of Duluth, Minnesota. In 1950, Seftenberg was appointed assistant deputy secretary of the United States Department of the Air Force and helped organized Air Force defense contract financial programs and later helped with Air Reserve, ROTC, and National Guard affairs. In 1951, Seftenberg brought the Air Force ROTC to Lawrence University. Seftenberg was vice-president of Lear, Inc. in Santa Monica, California and was on the Santa Monica planning commission. He then worked for Curtiss Wright Corp in 1957. In May 1970, Seftenberg retired as secretary of the Ramada Inns International and had worked for them since 1961. On June 7, 1970, Seftenberg died in Phoenix, Arizona.
