= La Rue, Wisconsin =

- Unincorporated community
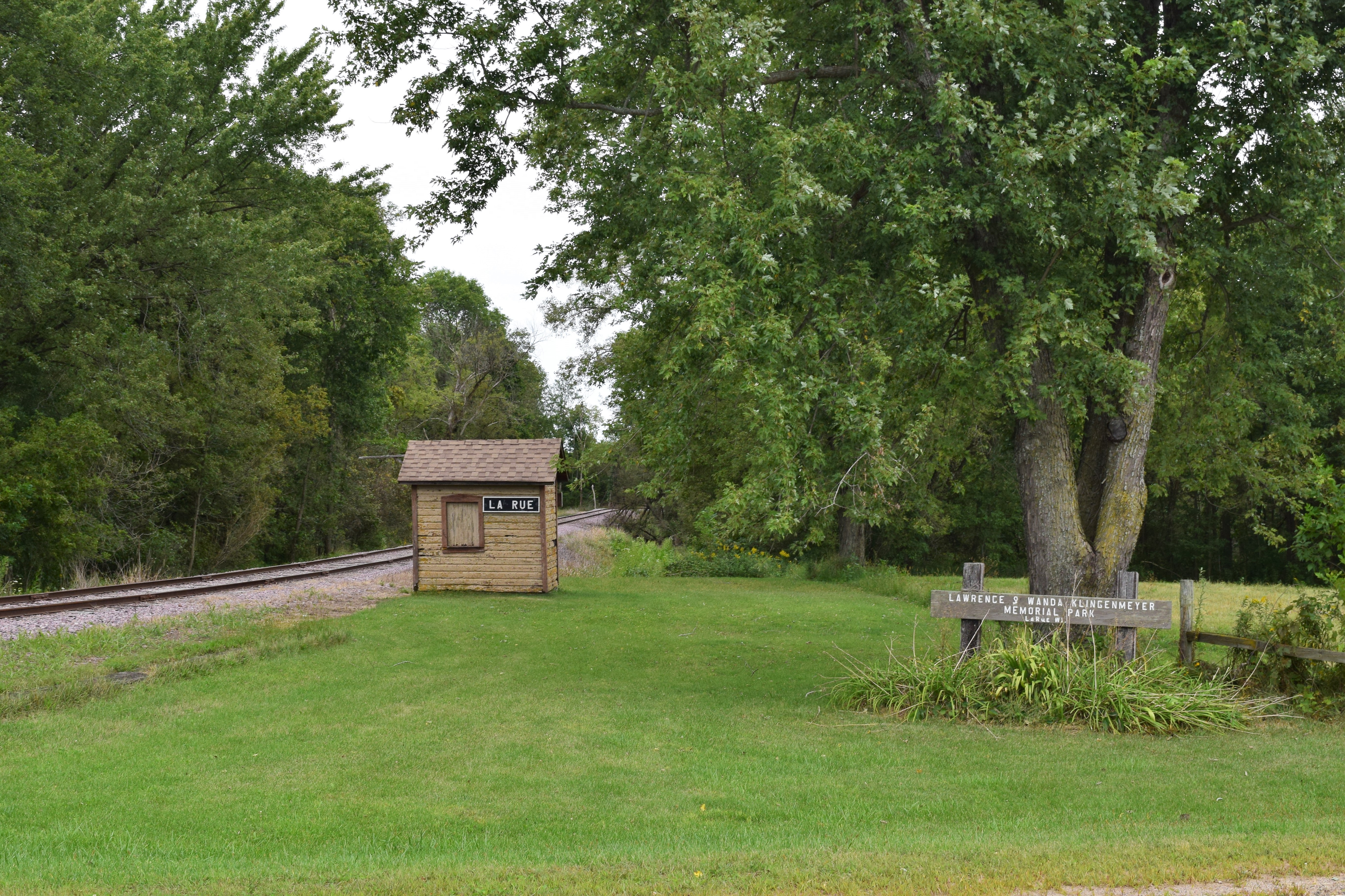
- Public park and railroad siding in La Rue

- Location within Wisconsin Location within the United States
- Coordinates: 43°26′10″N 89°53′22″W
- Country: United States
- State: Wisconsin
- County: Sauk
- Elevation: 879 ft (268 m)
- Time zone: UTC-6 (Central (CST))
  - Summer (DST): UTC-5 (CDT)
- Area code: 608
- GNIS feature ID: 1577687

La Rue is a small unincorporated community in the town of Freedom, in Sauk County, Wisconsin, United States. It is located on a spur line of the former Chicago and North Western Railway. Heritage railway excursions from the Mid-Continent Railway Museum, in North Freedom, pass through La Rue.

The community was named for W. G. La Rue, who held local mining interests.
