= Mid-Continent Railway Museum =

Railroad museum located in North Freedom, Wisconsin

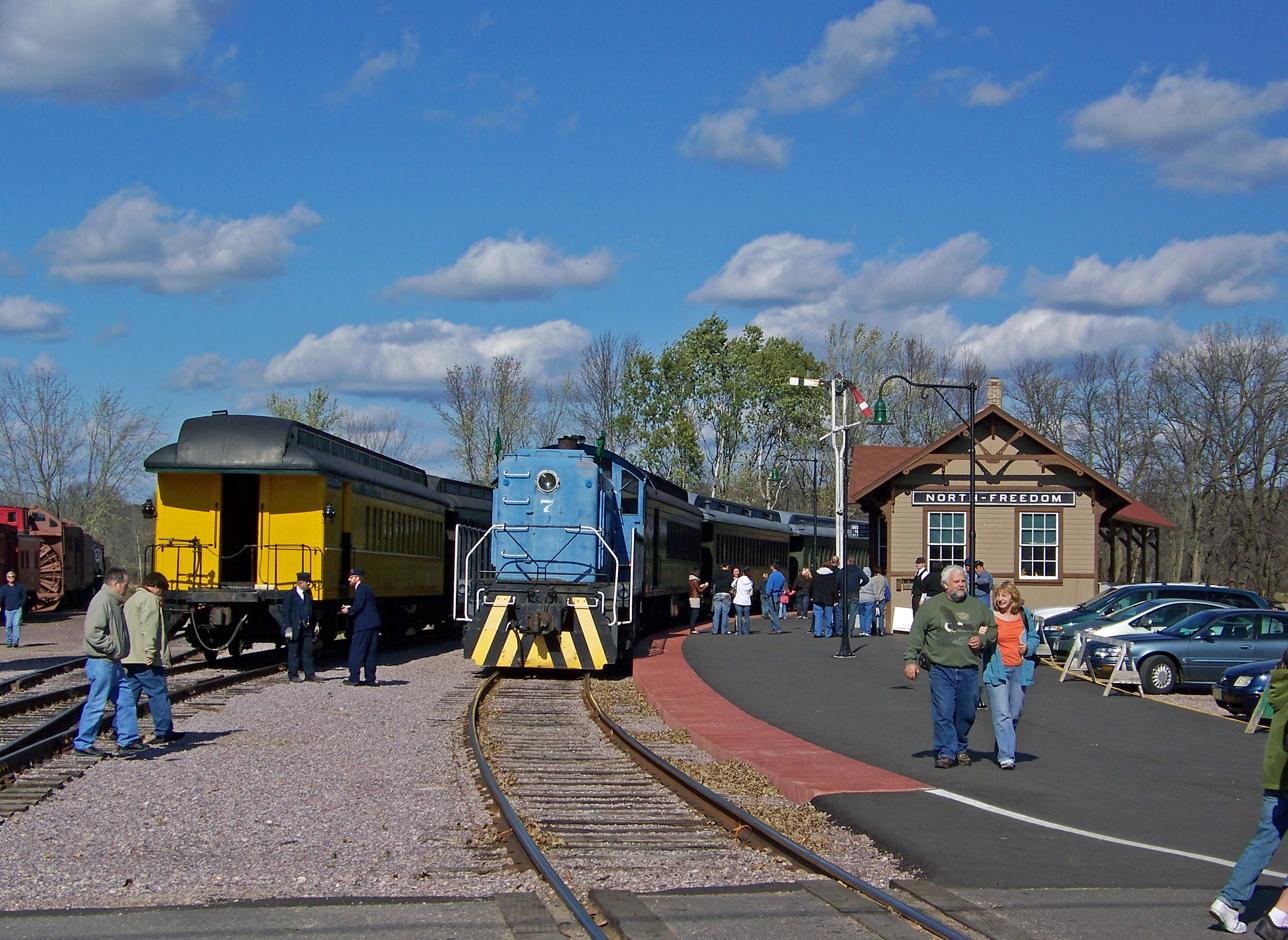
- The restored 1894 Chicago and North Western depot serves as the starting point for museum visitors
- Locale: E8948 Museum Road, North Freedom, Sauk County, Wisconsin
- Coordinates: 43.46°N 89.87°W
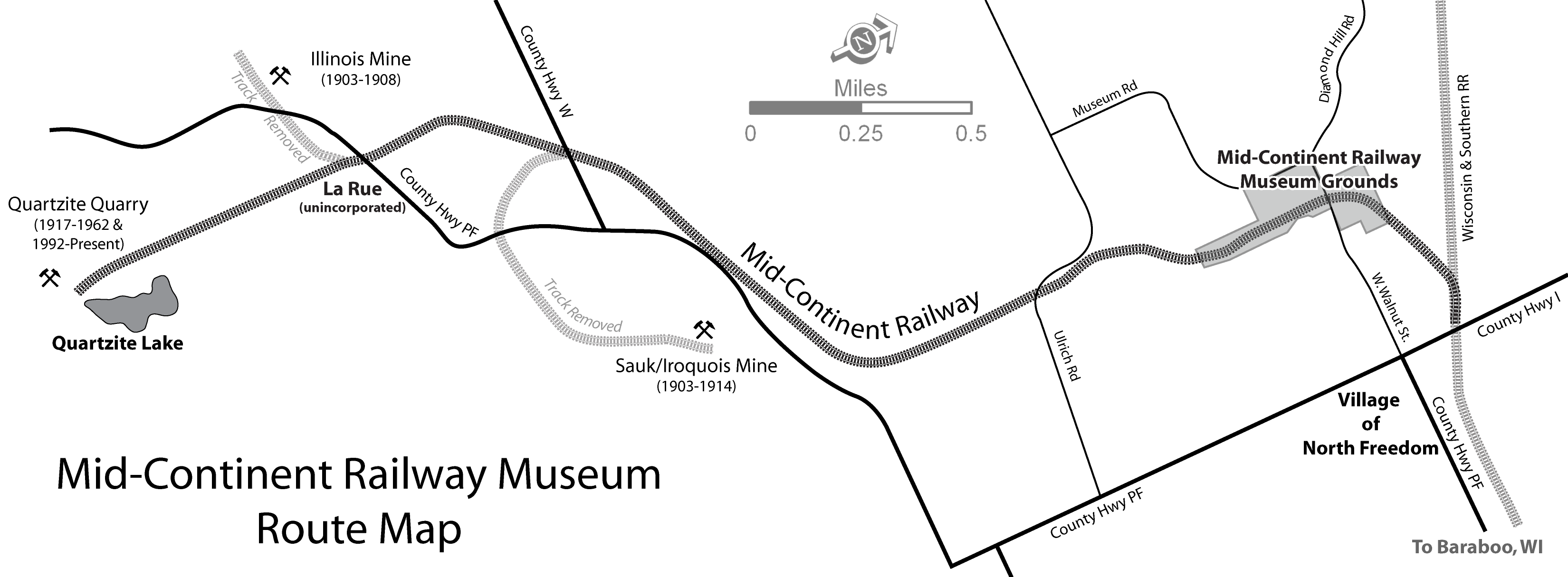
- Route map of the Mid-Continent Railway Museum
- Connections: Wisconsin and Southern Railroad

Commercial operations
- Built by: Chicago and North Western Transportation Company
- Original gauge: 4 ft 8 1/2 in (1,435 mm) standard gauge

Preserved operations
- Reporting mark: MCRY
- Stations: 1
- Length: 3.7 miles (6.0 km)
- Preserved gauge: 4 ft 8 1/2 in (1,435 mm) standard gauge

Commercial history
- Opened: 1959
- Closed: 2008–2009

Preservation history
- 1959: Railroad Historical Society of Milwaukee formed and first steam locomotive acquired
- 1962: Train rides first operated on the Hillsboro and Northeastern Railway and North Freedom branchline purchased
- 1963: Equipment moved to new location and trains first operated
- 1965: Depot moved from previous location
- Headquarters: North Freedom, Wisconsin

Website
- midcontinent.org

The Mid-Continent Railway Museum (reporting mark MCRY) is a railroad museum in North Freedom, Wisconsin, United States. The museum consists of static displays as well as a 7-mile (11 km) round trip ride aboard preserved railroad cars.

== History ==
The rail line used by the Mid-Continent Railway Museum is a spur off the original Chicago and North Western Railway mainline. With the development of the Illinois Iron mine in early 1903, the C&NW sent a team of engineers on July 8, 1903, to survey a route to the iron fields. By August 12, C&NW president Marvin Hughitt had arrived in North Freedom in person to announce that a branchline would be built. A second major mine, the Iroquois Mine (also called the Sauk Mine), was established in October not far from the new rail line. By December 1903, the 3-mile (4.8 km) branchline was completed at a cost of $40,533.

To support the increasing number of miners in the area, a new town called La Rue was platted, named after William G. La Rue. William La Rue was an area mining pioneer who demonstrated that the latest technological advancements in diamond drill technology could make iron mining in the area economically feasible. The town was surveyed and registered in January 1903, but it was soon realized that its location in the southwest corner of the intersection of present-day Highway W and Diamond Hill Road would prove to be too far from where the mines were developing. By November 1903, the development of the town shifted nearer to the Illinois Mine, 0.5 miles (0.80 km) to the south at the present day location of La Rue. At the height of iron mining production, the population of La Rue likely did not exceed 50 people, but the town did include a hotel, lumberyard, church, general store, and two saloons to supply and entertain the several hundred miners living nearby. Another townsite named Oliver was platted just east of La Rue, slightly closer to the Oliver Mining Company-owned Iroquois Mine, but no construction ever occurred.

At its peak, the Illinois Mine was shipping between five and 12 train car loads daily over the C&NW branchline, but La Rue's ironing mining days would be numbered. By June 1904, the mines were reaching depths of 400 to 500 feet (120 to 150 m) at which water infiltrating into the mine shafts began being problematic. Costs continued to grow as a result of the water infiltration until finally the Illinois Mine closed in 1908. By this time it was burdened by costs associated with pumping out 2,600 US gallons (9,800 L) of water per minute. A similar fate befell the Iroquois Mine in 1914, at which time it was pumping 4,500 US gallons (17,000 L) per minute from its mine shaft. With the end of iron mining operations, the town of La Rue quickly disappeared. By 1925, only one building remained: the La Rue tavern, which still stands today.

As the La Rue area iron mining days were ending, the need for quartzite rock was increasing. In 1917, Harbison-Walker Refractories Company established a quarry south of La Rue. The railroad track was extended 0.8 miles (1.3 km) south to serve the quarry. Operations continued until 1962 when the quarry ceased operation. The rail line was slated for abandonment soon after.

Meanwhile, in 1959, a group of rail enthusiasts from the Milwaukee area had joined to form the Railway Historical Society of Milwaukee. With the group's first acquisition of the Consumers Company No. 701 steam locomotive, the search for a home for their collection began. An agreement was reached with the Hillsboro and Northeastern Railway to operate diesel-powered train rides over their line beginning in 1962 under the name Mid-Continent Railway Museum. When it was learned the North Freedom branchline was available in 1962, the line was quickly purchased and the small collection of cars and locomotives were moved to North Freedom in 1963. By the summer of 1963, the move was finished and repairs to steam locomotive No. 1385 were completed, allowing steam train rides to be offered for the first time that summer. Train rides have been offered out of North Freedom by the museum every year since and a small rail yard was gradually built to hold the growing collection of preserved rail equipment.

In 2023, the museum hosted a 60th anniversary celebration event on May 27, marking 60 years to the day that the first train pulled passengers along the 7-mile route.

=== Flooding and reopening ===
In June 2008, the museum grounds were inundated by floodwaters of the Baraboo River. The museum closed for repairs until February 2009. The bridge's out-of-service status did not affect the route used by the museum's train rides, but did prevent the movement of rail cars and locomotives to and from the museum via the national rail network. Repairs to the bridge were completed in July 2018.

== Operations ==
=== Heritage railroad ===
The museum operates a heritage railroad which offers passenger excursion trains on a 7-mile (11 km) round trip. Trains leave from North Freedom, pass through the former mining community of La Rue, and turn around at a rock quarry, returning on the same route. The excursions take approximately one hour and operate daily from early June through Labor Day and most weekends in May, September, and October. Trains operate at a top speed of 15 mph, requiring approximately 12 minutes to travel the length of the rail line. Roughly 15 minutes are spent at the end of the line to move the locomotive to the opposite end of the train for the return trip to North Freedom. During the ride, a uniformed conductor punches passengers' tickets, shares railroad history, and answers questions.

Special event trains are also offered several times throughout the year, including Autumn Color weekends in the fall, Pumpkin Special runs near Halloween, Santa Express Weekends at the end of November, and the Snow Train in February. During special events, additional ride options are frequently offered such as first class trains, dinner trains, and brunch trains which offer onboard food and beverage service and utilize cars which are more luxurious than the train cars typically used.

For most of the museum's history, nearly all trains were pulled by steam locomotives although since February 2000, all trains have been pulled by diesel-electric locomotives pending the restoration or repair of the museum's steam locomotives.

== Collection ==
The Mid-Continent Railway Museum's collection emphasizes the preservation of railroad items operated in the upper Midwest from the period of 1880–1916, what the organization refers to as the "Golden Age of Railroading". During that time, railroads saw an unprecedented rate of expansion, growing in size in the United States from 93,000 to 254,037 miles (149,669 to 408,833 km) of track.

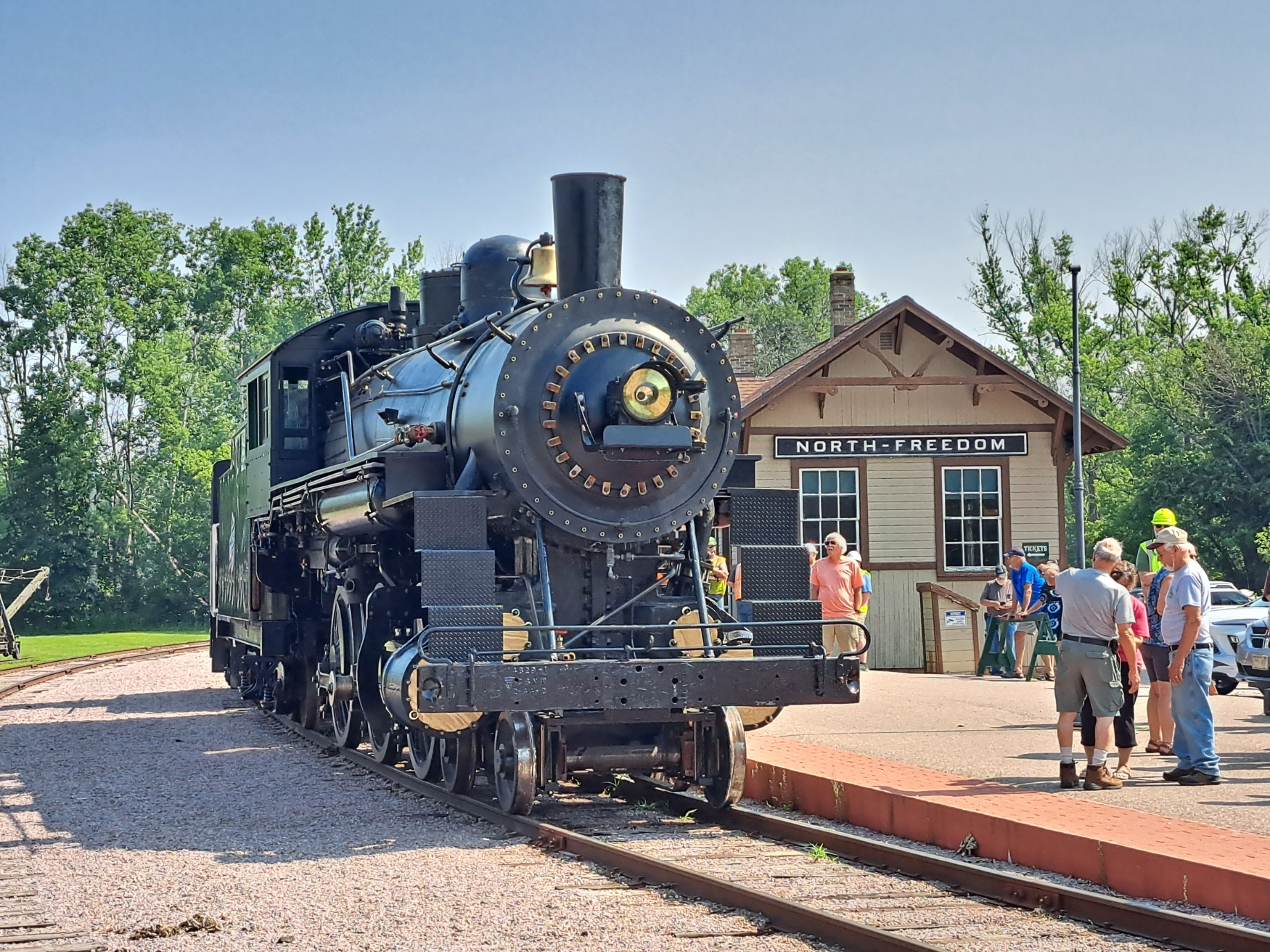
CNW 1385 posed at the North Freedom station at Mid-Continent Railway Museum after it was unloaded from delivery on July 14, 2025.

Two steam locomotives, Chicago and North Western 1385 and Western Coal and Coke 1, are being restored to federal guidelines. The museum's collection consists of nine steam locomotives, eight diesel locomotives, and over 100 other pieces of rolling stock. The museum has the largest collection of wooden passenger cars in the United States as well as five of only six surviving wooden boxcars built by the Mather Stock Car Company and the nation's last surviving fish car, Wisconsin Fish Commission "Badger Car No. 2". In 2015, the Museum decided to rationalize their collection by deaccessioning some of their equipment, including most of their disassembled locomotives.

The depot is an original Chicago and North Western Railway depot from the small town of Ableman, later Rock Springs, Wisconsin. It was built in 1894 and moved to the museum location in 1965. The depot consists of two seating areas separated by the ticket office, and a gift shop occupies the former freight room. The interior was extensively renovated following water damage during flooding in June 2008.

In addition to the depot, other railroad structures moved to the museum's location include a crossing shanty, crossing tower, section shed, and water tower. Additional structures have been built new to house and maintain the collection but attempts were made to make the structures appear period appropriate.

=== Locomotive roster ===
Locomotive details
Locomotive	Image	Manufacturer	Model	Build date	Status	Museum acquire date	Previous owner
Chicago and North Western 1385		American Locomotive Company	R-1 4-6-0	March 1907	Under restoration	1962	Chicago and North Western Transportation Company
Consumers Company 701		American Locomotive Company	0-4-0	1914	Stored	1959	Consumers Company
Copper Range 29		American Locomotive Company	C2 2-8-0	February 1907	On static display	2003	Trans-Northern
Dardanelle and Russellville 9		Baldwin Locomotive Works	2-6-0	1884	Undergoing cosmetic restoration	1963	Dardanelle and Russellville Railroad
Goodman Lumber Company 9		Lima Locomotive Works	Class B Shay	1909	Undergoing cosmetic restoration	1988	Historyland Museum
Kewaunee, Green Bay and Western 49		American Locomotive Company	2-8-0	March 1929	On static display	1981	City of Wisconsin Rapids, Wisconsin
Lake Superior and Ishpeming 22		American Locomotive Company	SC-4 2-8-0	January 1910	On static display	1985	Marquette and Huron Mountain Railroad
Soo Line 2645		Brooks Locomotive Works	E-25 4-6-0	November 1900	On static display	1988	City of Waukesha, Wisconsin
Western Coal and Coke 1		Montreal Locomotive Works	4-6-0	December 1913	Disassembled, awaiting operational restoration	1965	Lethbridge Collieries Limited
Arkansas, Louisiana and Missouri 10		Electro-Motive Diesel	NW2 diesel locomotive	1949	Operational	2018	Domtar
John Morrell and Company 7		American Locomotive Company	S-1	1944	Operational	1996	Association of American Railroads
Milwaukee Road 988		American Locomotive Company	RSC-2	1947	Under restoration	1985	Trans-Northern Incorporated
Montana Western 31		Electro-Motive Corporation	Gas-electric car	October 1925	Under restoration	1965	Montana Western Railway
United States Army 4		General Electric	45-ton switcher	1943	Operational	1972	Pullman Company
United States Army 1256		Baldwin Locomotive Works	RS-4-TC	1954	Operational	2006	United States Army
Wisconsin Power and Light 3		Plymouth Locomotive Works	30-ton switcher	1952	Stored	1987	Wisconsin Power and Light Company
Wisconsin Sand and Gravel 2		Plymouth Locomotive Works	HL-18	1928	Stored	1963	Wisconsin Sand and Gravel Company

=== Former locomotive roster ===
Locomotive details
Locomotive	Image	Manufacturer	Model	Build date	Status	Time on the museum	Current owner
Alabama, Tennessee and Northern 401		Baldwin Locomotive Works	SC-1 2-10-0 steam locomotive	1928	Static display	1964-2015	Age of Steam Roundhouse
Central Illinois Public Service Company 5		H.K. Porter, Inc.	2-4-2 steam locomotive	1945	Awaiting restoration	1963-1971	St. Louis, Iron Mountain and Southern Railway
Central Illinois Public Service Company 6		Vulcan Iron Works	0-4-0 steam locomotive	1923	Awaiting restoration	1965-2019	Private owner
Chicago, Burlington and Quincy 4960		Baldwin Locomotive Works	O-1a 2-8-2 steam locomotive	1923	Operational	1970-1989	Grand Canyon Railway
Lake Superior and Ishpeming 29		American Locomotive Company	SC-3 2-8-0 steam locomotive	1906	Undergoing overhaul	1985-1989	Grand Canyon Railway
Louisiana Cypress 2		Lima Locomotive Works	2-6-0 steam locomotive	1906	Awaiting restoration	1960-2015	Private owner
McCloud Railway 9		Baldwin Locomotive Works	2-6-2 steam locomotive	1901	Static display	1964-1971	Age of Steam Roundhouse
Milwaukee Road 30		Dodge	Sedan inspection car	1947	Display	1961-2014	Illinois Railway Museum
New York Central 6721		American Locomotive Company	B-11k 0-6-0 steam locomotive	1913	Static display	1963-1980	Utica and Mohawk Valley Chapter of the National Railway Historical Society
Saginaw Timber Company 2		Baldwin Locomotive Works	2-8-2 steam locomotive	1912	Operational	1982-2017	Rick Franklin
Union Pacific 440		Baldwin Locomotive Works	C-57 2-8-0 steam locomotive	1900	Static display	1975-2003	Langlede County Historical Society
Warren and Ouachita Valley 1		Baldwin Locomotive Works	4-6-0 steam locomotive	1906	Static display	1965-1985	Private owner

== Gallery ==
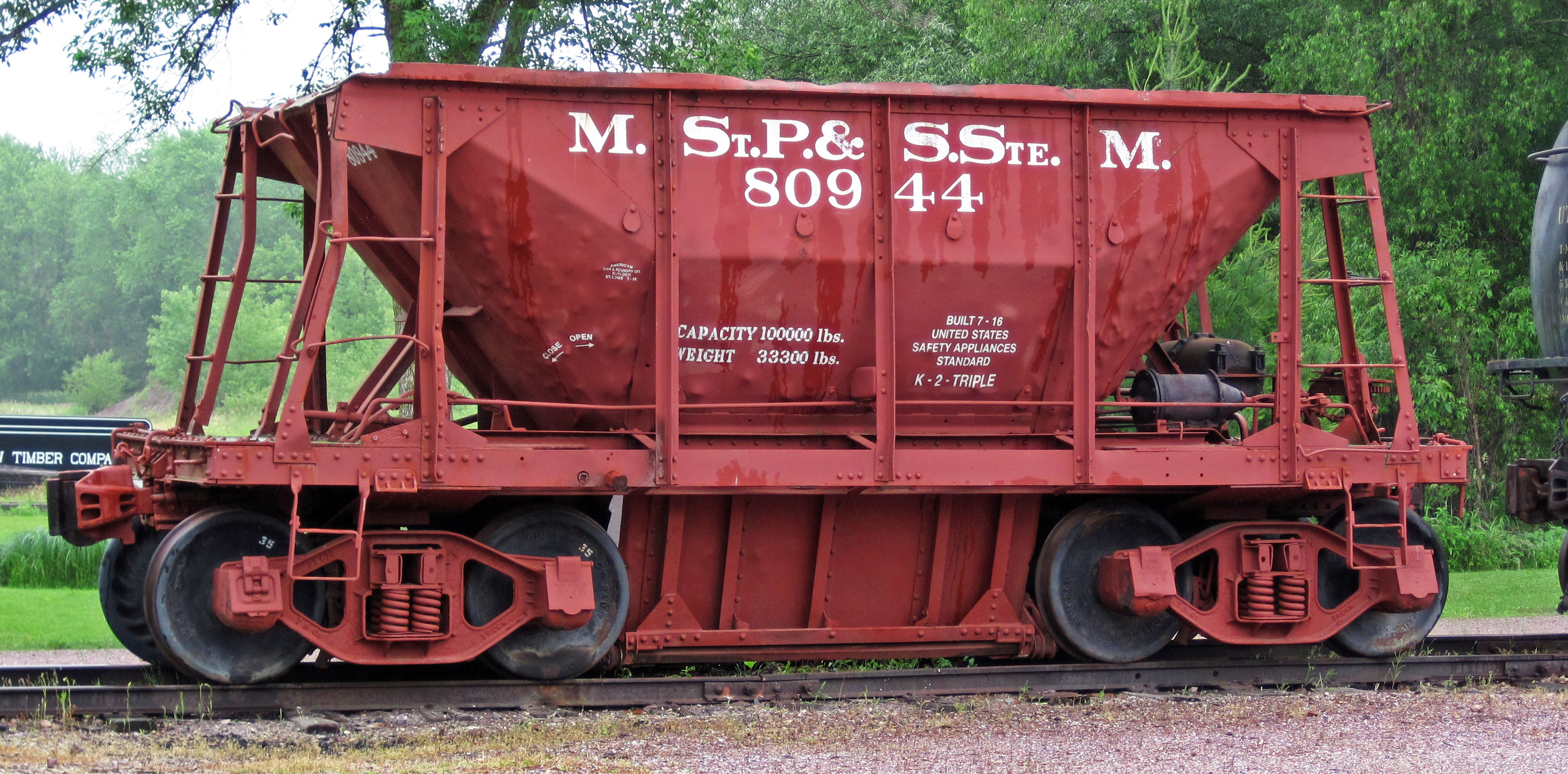
Minneapolis, St. Paul and Sault Ste. Marie 80944, an ore car built in 1916

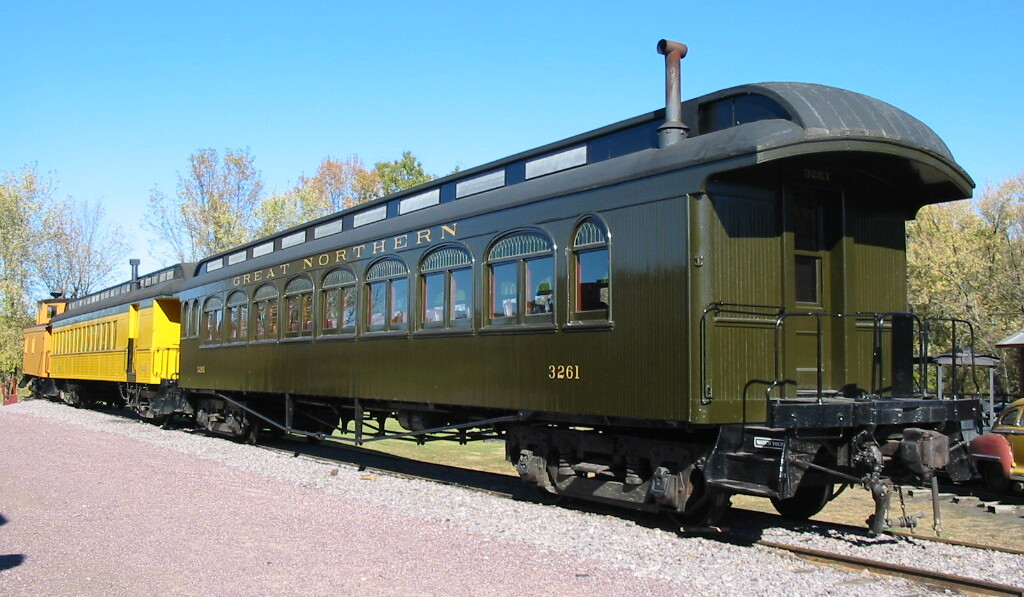
Great Northern 3621, a passenger car built by Barney and Smith Car Company

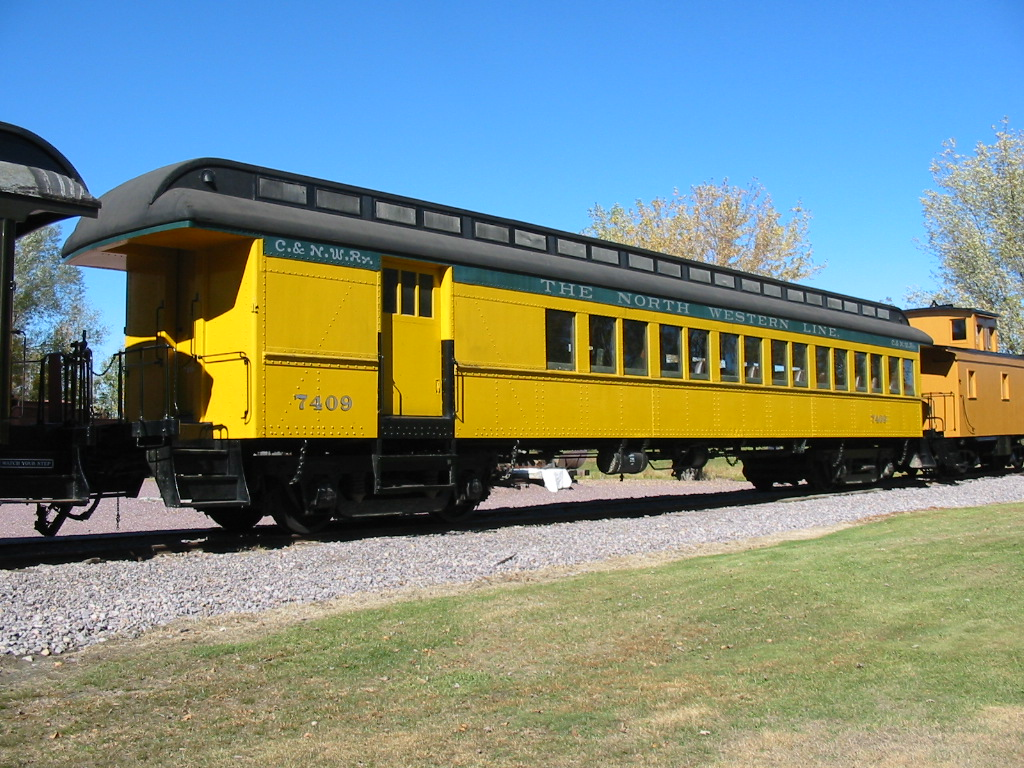
Chicago and North Western 7409, a coach-baggage combine car

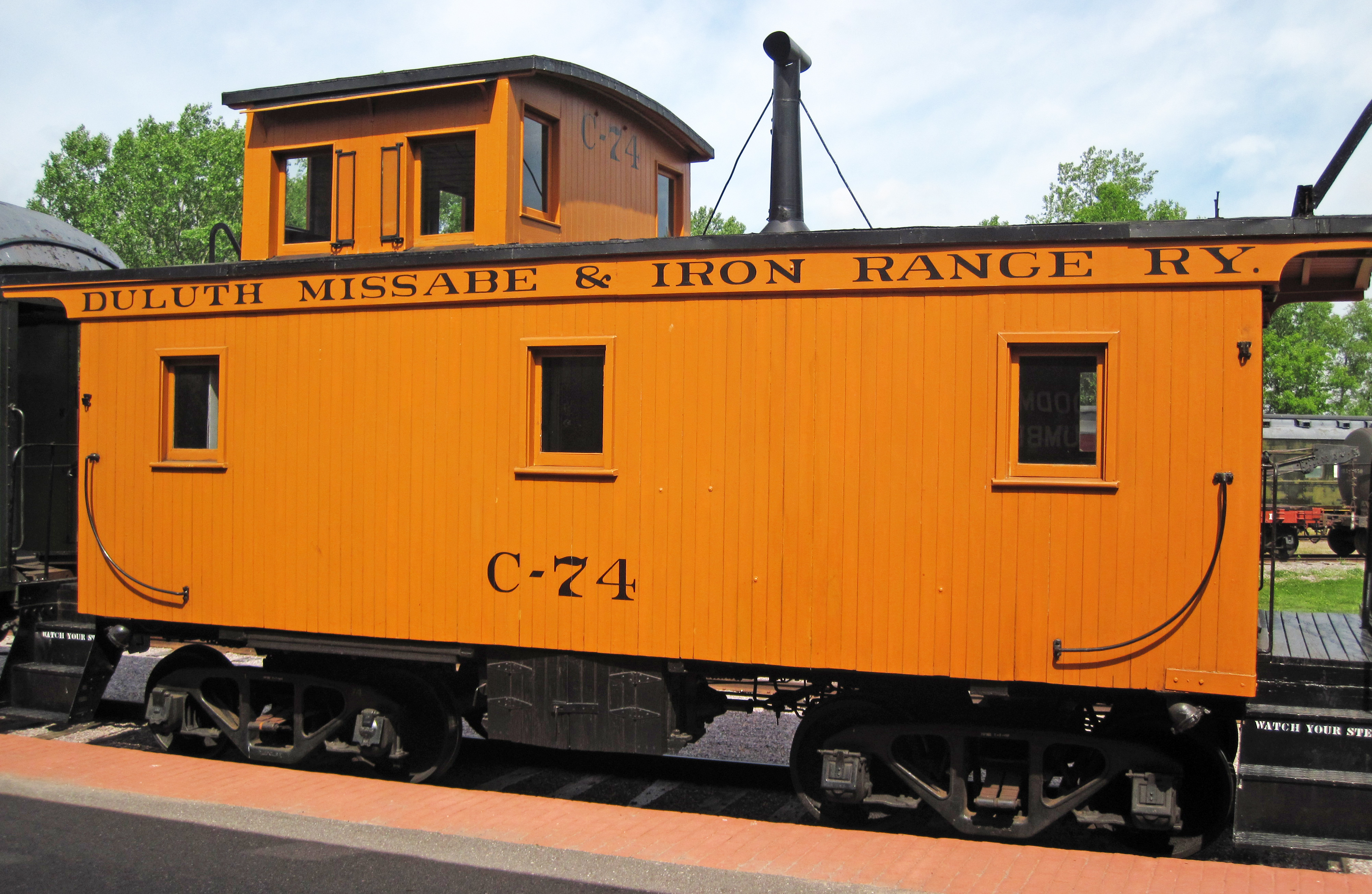
Duluth, Missabe and Iron Range C-74, a caboose built in 1924

== See also ==
- List of heritage railroads in the United States
- List of railway museums
- List of historical societies in Wisconsin
