= Montana Western Railway (1909–1970) =

Former railroad in Montana, United States

The Montana Western Railway (reporting mark MW) was an American railroad linking the towns of Conrad and Valier in Pondera County, Montana, a distance of 20 miles (32 km).

The railroad was constructed in 1909 by the Valier Land and Water Company as part of an effort to develop new agricultural lands in the Valier area. The line connected with the Great Northern Railway (GN) at Conrad, and the Great Northern later assumed control of the MW. The trackage continues to be operated today by the BNSF Railway, corporate successor to the GN.

Montana Western #31, a gas-electric railcar formerly operated by the railroad, is now preserved at the Mid-Continent Railway Museum in North Freedom, Wisconsin. The #31, constructed in 1925, is the oldest surviving piece of equipment constructed by the Electro-Motive Company.
