= Freedom, Sauk County, Wisconsin =

Town of Freedom, Wisconsin
- Town
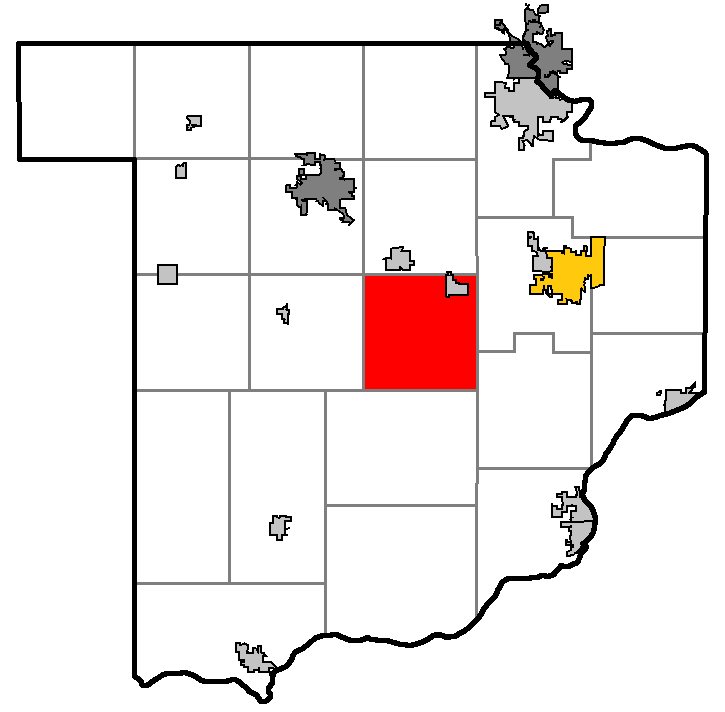
- Location of the Town of Freedom, Sauk County, Wisconsin

- Location of Sauk County, Wisconsin
- Coordinates: 43°26′1″N 89°53′38″W
- Country: United States
- State: Wisconsin
- County: Sauk

Area
  - Total: 34.7 sq mi (89.9 km^{2})
  - Land: 34.6 sq mi (89.6 km^{2})
  - Water: 0.12 sq mi (0.3 km^{2})
- Elevation: 890 ft (270 m)

Population (2020)
  - Total: 449
  - Density: 13.0/sq mi (5.01/km^{2})
- Time zone: UTC-6 (Central (CST))
  - Summer (DST): UTC-5 (CDT)
- Area code: 608
- FIPS code: 55-27675
- GNIS feature ID: 1583243
- Website: freedomsaukwi.gov

The Town of Freedom is a located in Sauk County, Wisconsin, United States. The population was 449 at the 2020 census. The unincorporated community of La Rue is located within the town. The town was named from the American ideal of freedom.

== Geography ==
According to the United States Census Bureau, the town has a total area of 34.7 square miles (89.9 km^{2}), of which 34.6 square miles (89.6 km^{2}) is land and 0.1 square mile (0.3 km^{2}) (0.35%) is water.

== Demographics ==
As of the census of 2000, there were 416 people, 158 households, and 121 families residing in the town. The population density was 12.0 people per square mile (4.6/km^{2}). There were 182 housing units at an average density of 5.3 per square mile (2.0/km^{2}). The racial makeup of the town was 97.84% White, 1.20% Asian, 0.24% from other races, and 0.72% from two or more races. Hispanic or Latino of any race were 0.24% of the population.

There were 158 households, out of which 33.5% had children under the age of 18 living with them, 71.5% were married couples living together, 1.9% had a female householder with no husband present, and 22.8% were non-families. 19.0% of all households were made up of individuals, and 7.0% had someone living alone who was 65 years of age or older. The average household size was 2.63 and the average family size was 3.05.

In the town, the population was spread out, with 24.0% under the age of 18, 4.8% from 18 to 24, 30.8% from 25 to 44, 32.9% from 45 to 64, and 7.5% who were 65 years of age or older. The median age was 40 years. For every 100 females, there were 108.0 males. For every 100 females age 18 and over, there were 116.4 males.

The median income for a household in the town was $55,000, and the median income for a family was $57,500. Males had a median income of $31,875 versus $22,778 for females. The per capita income for the town was $23,332. About 2.3% of families and 2.5% of the population were below the poverty line, including 2.0% of those under age 18 and none of those age 65 or over.

== See also ==
- North Freedom, Wisconsin

== External Sources ==
- Town of Freedon Official Website
