= Canadian National 1009 =

Preserved CN class F-1-b 4-6-0 locomotive

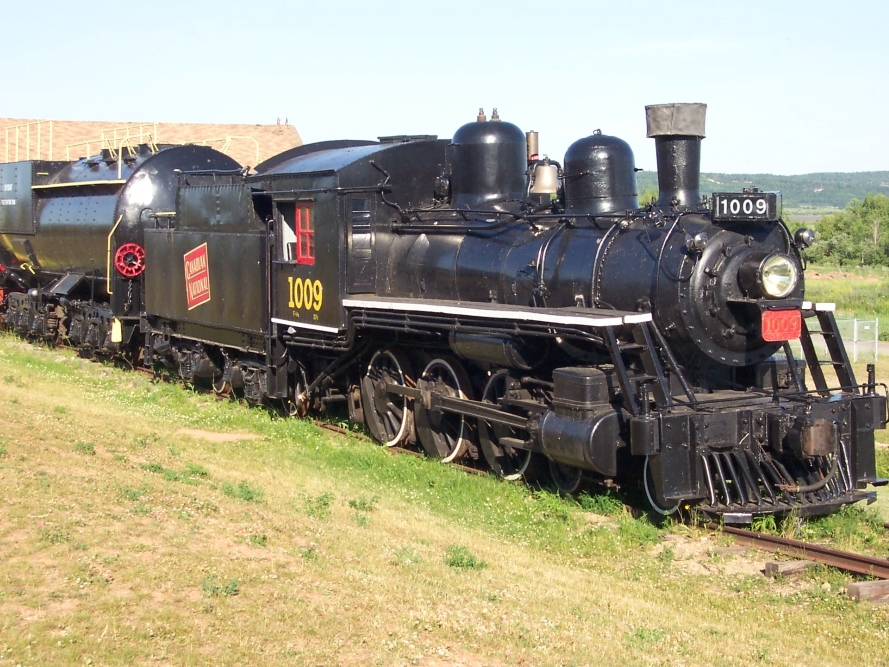
- Canadian National No. 1009 on static display in 2003
Type and origin
- Power type: Steam
- Builder: Montreal Locomotive Works
- Serial number: 51132
- Model: F-1-b
- Build date: May 1912
Specifications
- Configuration
  - Whyte: 4-6-0
  - UIC: 2'C
- Gauge: 4 ft 8 1/2 in (1,435 mm)
- Driver dia.: 51 in (1,300 mm)
- Wheelbase: 47.56 ft (14.50 m)
  - Engine: 20.67 ft (6.30 m)
  - Drivers: 10.50 ft (3.20 m)
- Adhesive weight: 85,000 lb (39,000 kg)
- Loco weight: 111,000 lb (50,000 kg)
- Tender weight: 87,500 lb (39,700 kg)
- Total weight: 198,500 lb (90,000 kg)
- Fuel type: Coal
- Fuel capacity: 8.80 long tons (8.94 t)
- Water cap.: 4,200 US gal (16,000 L; 3,500 imp gal)
- Firebox
  - Grate area: 21.21 sq ft (1.970 m^{2})
- Boiler pressure: 160 psi (1,100 kPa)
- Heating surface
  - Firebox: 115 sq ft (10.7 m^{2})
- Cylinders: Two, outside
- Cylinder size: 18 in × 24 in (460 mm × 610 mm)
- Valve gear: Stephenson
- Valve type: Piston valves
- Loco brake: Air
- Train brakes: Air
- Couplers: Knuckle
Performance figures
- Power output: 3,394 PS (2,496 kW; 3,348 hp)
- Tractive effort: 20,736 lb (9,406 kg)
- Factor of adh.: 4.10
Career
- Operators: O'Brien McDougall and O'Gorman; Canadian Government Railways; Canadian National Railway; Salem and Hillsborough Railway
- Class: CN F-1-b
- Numbers: BM&G 15; CGR 4529; CN 1009; CN 1165
- Retired: March 1958 (revenue service); August 1998 (excursion service)
- Restored: April 19, 1986
- Current owner: New Brunswick Railway Museum
- Disposition: On static display

Canadian National 1009 is a preserved Canadian 4-6-0 "Ten-wheeler" type steam locomotive built by the Montreal Locomotive Works (MLW) in 1912. It was originally built with 1880's specifications as part of a standard locomotive design to help construct a Canadian National Transcontinental Railway (NTR). The locomotive would subsequently serve the Canadian Government Railways, which was later absorbed into the Canadian National Railway. No. 1009's last revenue run took place in the spring of 1958, and it was subsequently donated to the Canadian Railway Museum for static display. Later on, it was purchased by the Salem and Hillsborough Railway with the intention to use it to pull their tourist trains. As of 2026, No. 1009 remains on indoor static display.

== History ==
=== Development ===
Canadian National 1009's design was initially developed by the Pittsburgh Locomotive Works in the late 1880s. The early 4-6-0 design came with a straight boiler, and copies of the design were purchased by American railroad companies, such as the Bessemer and Lake Erie and the Duluth, Missabe and Northern. However, as a result of larger and more modern locomotive designs being developed at the turn of the 20th century, the early Pittsburgh design became obsolete, and several of the remaining locomotives of the design were sold or leased to Canadian companies through locomotive dealerships.

When the third Transcontinental Railway across Canada was under construction, a small locomotive with low speed was needed to assist with the construction, and the attention turned to the early Pittsburgh-built locomotives that were based in Canada by then. This design was subsequently modified with superheated flues and a larger firebox, in order to create a higher boiler pressure and a greater tractive effort. The Montreal Locomotive Works (MLW) initially constructed fifteen locomotives of the 4-6-0 design in the early 1910s for O'Brien McDougall and O'Gorman, which was one of the companies in charge of constructing the National Transcontinental Railway.

=== Revenue service ===
No. 1009 was built in May 1912 for the O'Brien McDougall and O'Gorman company as their locomotive No. 15. No. 15 was used to assist with the construction of the transcontinental line, as well as the construction of various other railway lines. In 1915, O'Brien McDougall and O'Gorman was among a few small railway companies that fell under control of the Canadian Government Railways, and No. 15 was subsequently renumbered to 4529. A few years later, in 1918, the Canadian Government Railways merged with the Canadian Northern Railway to create the Canadian National Railway (CN), and No. 4529 was renumbered again to 1009, and it became classified as an F-1-b.

The locomotive was thereafter reassigned to serve branchlines in The Maritimes, including the Hillsborough line in New Brunswick, before it was displaced by a larger G-16-a 1100 class locomotive. It was subsequently reassigned to operate at Stellarton, Nova Scotia. In December 1955, No. 1009 was put into storage in a shop at Stellarton with 15,000 miles accumulated since back-shopping at Moncton. In 1957, CN placed an order of GMD GMD1 diesel locomotives, most of which would be numbered 1000–1077, and No. 1009 was consequently renumbered to 1165, in order to avoid confusion. The locomotive's last run under CN ownership was a farewell to steam fan trip out of Montreal, Quebec in March 1958. It was subsequently donated to the Canadian Railway Museum in Saint-Constant, Quebec, where it spent the next twenty-five years on static display.

=== Preservation ===
During its time on display in Saint-Constant, No. 1165's road number was reverted to 1009. In 1983, the No. 1009 was acquired by the Salem and Hillsborough Railway (S&H), a tourist railroad that ran on former CN trackage between Hillsborough and Salisbury, New Brunswick. The locomotive arrived at the S&H via flatcar on November 13 of that year. S&H crews restored No. 1009 to operating condition on April 19, 1986, and the locomotive pulled the S&H's inaugural train that the following month on May 17. The S&H quickly became a popular attraction, and No. 1009 was subsequently used to pull the majority of the steam-powered trains on the tourist line for the next several years. In 1988, No. 1009 lost a tire and broke a spoke on the rear driving wheel on the fireman's side, and it was subsequently sidelined for repairs while the S&H's recently restored Canadian Pacific (CPR) 4-4-0 No. 29 served as a temporary stand-in for three weeks, until No. 1009 returned to service. No. 1009 also performed a few doubleheaders with No. 29, including one in late September 1988 for the pensioners of CN, CPR, and Via Rail. No. 1009 appeared in the 1989 television film Lantern Hill.

On September 16, 1994, the S&H's yardhouse was burned down by an arson attack, damaging everything inside, including No. 29, some diesel locomotives, some passenger cars, several tools, offices, and historical records. However, No. 1009 was being stored outdoors at the time, so apart from a broken rear headlight and some blistered paint on the tender, the locomotive was intact. Although, the locomotive was subsequently put on outdoor display outside of the S&H's Hillsborough depot while the railway continued to operate their trains solely with diesel power. In July 1998, a private Canadian film company approached an agreement with the S&H to film certain places on the railway's property for the direct-to-video special "Paradise Siding", and the railway decided to repair No. 1009 for it to be featured. The S&H had only intended to repair certain parts of the locomotive's boiler and cylinders in order to raise enough pressure in the boiler to make smoke flow out of the smokestack and to blow the whistle. Thus, some other critical components, such as the air pumps, were unrepaired, and the S&H's diesel locomotives Numbers 1754 and 8245 were used for braking purposes. The S&H received a $5,000 grant from the Government of New Brunswick, and a group of volunteers worked hard to overhaul the components required to raise the locomotive's boiler pressure.

In August, Federal boiler inspectors inspected a test fire of the locomotive, and they approved of No. 1009's boiler certificate being renewed for one week. However, the smoke being created went directly through the smokestack and by-passed the cylinders, so the locomotive couldn't move on its own. Between August 16 and August 19, filming had taken place on the S&H's trackage at Salem, with No. 1009 being present for certain takes. After filming was wrapped up and the locomotive's one week certificate expired, No. 1009 returned to its static display status. In 2005, the S&H changed its name to the New Brunswick Railway Museum (NBRM), and a few years later, No. 1009 was put indoors for protection from the outdoor elements.

== See also ==
- Western Coal and Coke 1
- Canadian National 89
- Canadian National 1392
- Canadian National 7470
- Canadian Pacific 1238
- Canadian Pacific 1286
