= Soo Line 2645 =

Preserved American 4-6-0 locomotive

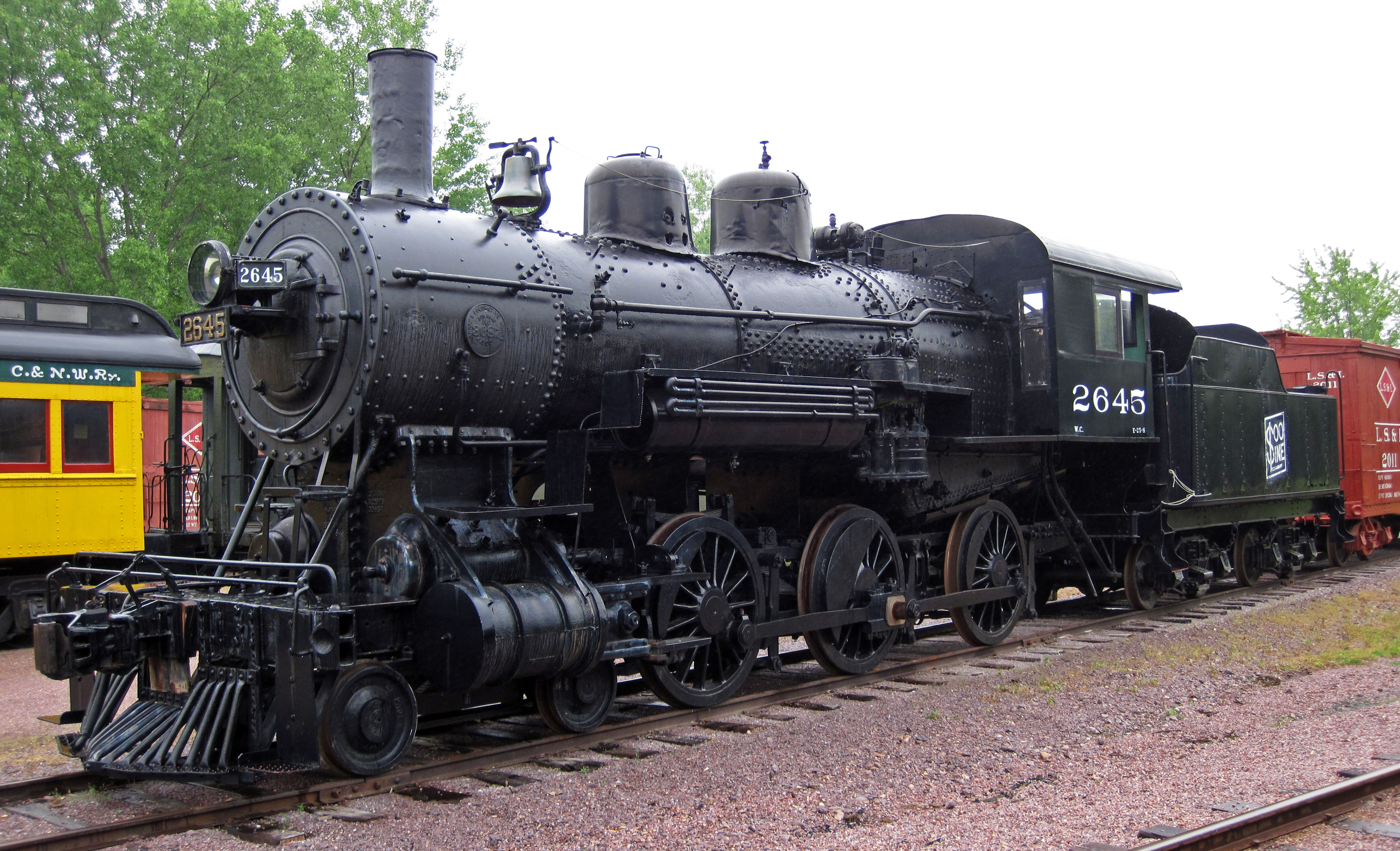
- Soo Line 2645 at Mid-Continent Railway Museum in June 2015
Type and origin
- Power type: Steam
- Builder: Brooks Locomotive Works
- Serial number: 3687
- Build date: November 1900
Specifications
- Configuration
  - Whyte: 4-6-0
  - UIC: 2'C'
- Gauge: 4 ft 8 1/2 in (1,435 mm) standard gauge
- Driver dia.: 57 in (1,400 mm)
- Wheelbase: 24.83 ft (7.57 m)
  - Engine: 52.95 ft (16.14 m)
- Adhesive weight: 122,000 ft (37,000 m)
- Loco weight: 158,000 ft (48,000 m)
- Tender weight: 102,000 ft (31,000 m)
- Total weight: 260,000 ft (79,000 m)
- Fuel type: Coal
- Fuel capacity: 9.50 t (9.35 long tons; 10.47 short tons)
- Water cap.: 5,000 US gal (19,000 L; 4,200 imp gal)
- Firebox
  - Grate area: 54.40 sq ft (5.054 m^{2})
- Boiler pressure: 200 psi (1,400 kPa)
- Cylinders: Two, outside
- Cylinder size: 20 in × 26 in (510 mm × 660 mm)
- Valve gear: Stephenson
- Valve type: Piston valves
- Loco brake: Air
- Train brakes: Air
- Couplers: Knuckle
Performance figures
- Maximum speed: 63 mph (101 km/h)
- Tractive effort: 31,018 lbf (137,970 N)
Career
- Operators: Minneapolis, St. Paul and Sault Ste. Marie Railway
- Class: E-25
- Numbers: SOO 2645
- Locale: United States Upper Midwest
- Retired: October 1952
- Current owner: Mid-Continent Railway Museum
- Disposition: On static display

Soo Line 2645 is a preserved E-25 class 4-6-0 "Ten-wheeler" type steam locomotive. It was built in November 1900 by the Brooks Locomotive Works as part of the E-25 class for the Wisconsin Central as No. 247. In 1909, the Wisconsin Central leased by the Soo Line Railroad, and from there on, the locomotive was renumbered 2645. No. 2645 spent its entire career in Wisconsin. Often it was stationed in Manitowoc and, Fond du Lac. The locomotive also received a class 5 overhaul in early 1952, and it was reassigned to Neenah.

Its last revenue freight assignment occurred on October 29, 1952, and it was afterwards donated to Frame Park in Waukesha, Wisconsin, where it remained on static display until 1972. That year, it was moved to the nearby ex-Chicago and North Western station that eventually became a restaurant. On September 20, 1988, the Waukesha City Council donated No. 2645 to the Mid-Continent Railway Museum (MCRY). The following year, a realignment of ex-C&NW trackage was made for a new connection on the Wisconsin Central mainline, and the Wisconsin & Calumet Railroad (WICT) ordered the locomotive to be moved, so when volunteers arrived at Waukesha, they quickly prepped the locomotive for movement to North Freedom on its own wheels.

No. 2645 arrived on the property in July 1989. During the Soo Line Historical & Technical Society’s annual convention during the summer of 2004, it received a cosmetic restoration to improve its overall appearance as a static display. As of 2026, No. 2645 continues to reside at North Freedom for static display.
