= Canadian National 89 =

Preserved CN class E-10-a locomotive

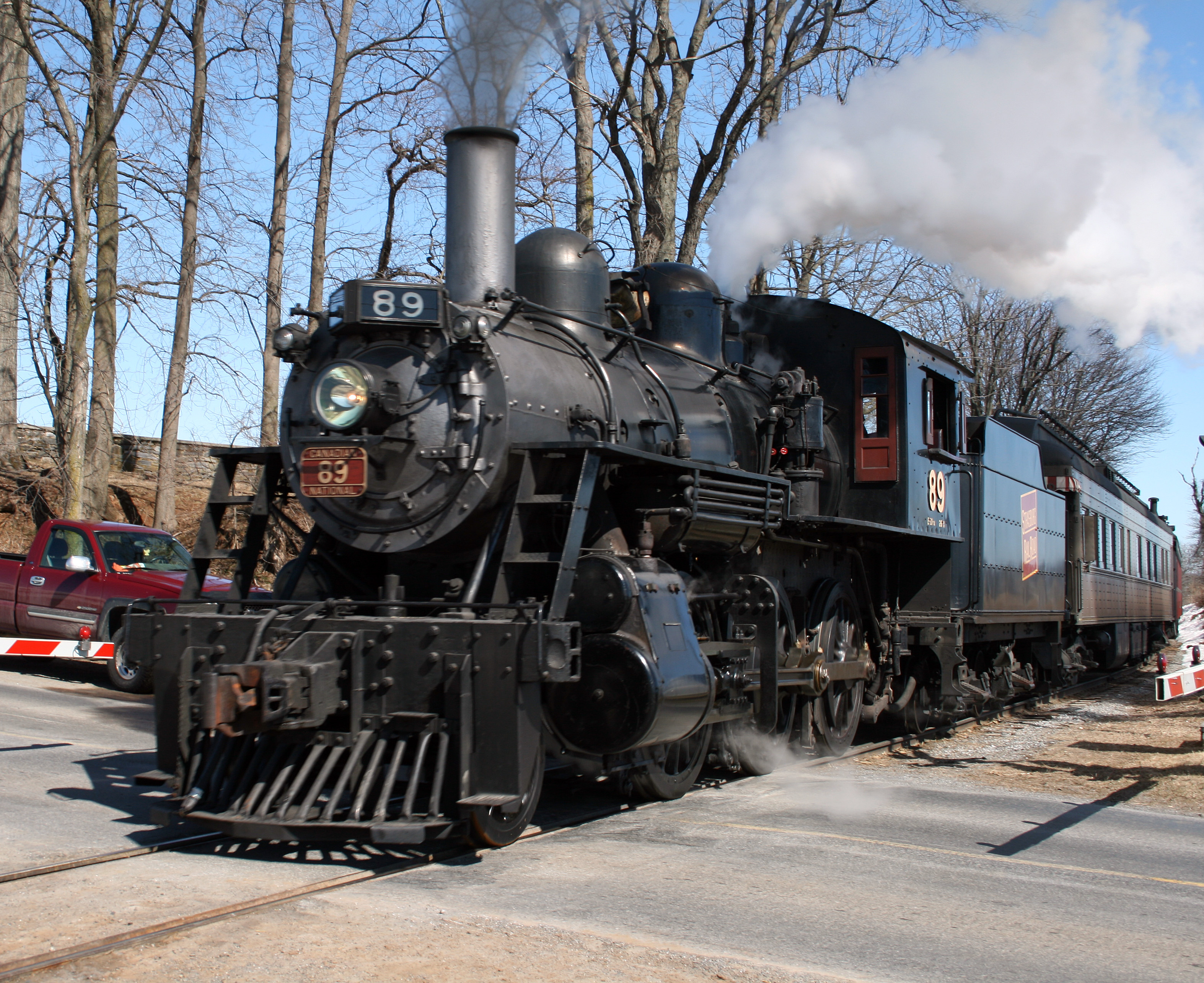
- Canadian National No. 89 hauling an excursion on the Strasburg Rail Road on March 6, 2010
Type and origin
- Power type: Steam
- Builder: Canadian Locomotive Company
- Serial number: 922
- Build date: February 1910
- Rebuilder: Strasburg Rail Road
- Rebuild date: November 1988
Specifications
- Configuration
  - Whyte: 2-6-0
- Gauge: 4 ft 8 1/2 in (1,435 mm)
- Driver dia.: 63 in (1.600 m)
- Wheelbase: 49.71 ft (15.15 m)
- Adhesive weight: 120,600 lb (54.7 t)
- Loco weight: 141,800 lb (64.3 t)
- Fuel type: Coal
- Fuel capacity: 10 long tons (10 t)
- Water cap.: 6,000 imperial gallons (27,000 L; 7,200 US gal)
- Boiler pressure: 170 lbf/in^{2} (1.17 MPa)
- Heating surface
  - Firebox: 166 sq ft (15.4 m^{2})
- Cylinders: Two, outside
- Cylinder size: 21 in × 26 in (533 mm × 660 mm)
- Valve gear: Stephenson
- Valve type: Piston valves
- Loco brake: Air
- Train brakes: Air
- Couplers: Knuckle
Performance figures
- Tractive effort: 26,300 lbf (116.99 kN)
Career
- Operators: Grand Trunk Railway; Canadian National Railway; Green Mountain Railroad; Steamtown, U.S.A.; Strasburg Rail Road
- Class: GT: E-12; CN: E-10-a
- Power class: CN: 26%
- Number in class: 9 of 24
- Numbers: GT 1009; GT 911; CN 911; GMRC 89; CN 89; SRC 89
- Retired: 1958
- Restored: January 25, 1965
- Current owner: Strasburg Rail Road
- Disposition: Operational

Canadian National 89 is a E-10-a class 2-6-0 "Mogul" type steam locomotive, built in February 1910 by the Canadian Locomotive Company (CLC) for the Grand Trunk Railway (GT). Its number, 1009, was changed to 911 in 1919. The Grand Trunk's 1923 merger brought the locomotive under Canadian National (CN) ownership. It was renumbered as No. 89 in 1951 and retired seven years later. It was purchased by F. Nelson Blount in 1961, who sent it to operate on the Green Mountain Railroad (GMRC) and later Steamtown, U.S.A.. It was purchased in 1972 for use on half-hour excursions by the Strasburg Rail Road (SRC), which continues to operate it as of 2025.

== History ==
=== Revenue service ===
No. 89 was built in February 1910 by the Canadian Locomotive Company (CLC) in Kingston, Ontario, for the Grand Trunk Railway (GT) as No. 1009. It has a wheel arrangement of 2-6-0. In 1919, it was renumbered to No. 911. In 1923, the GT and its locomotives were merged into the Canadian National Railway (CN). In 1951, No. 911 was renumbered as No. 89. Most of 89's career on the CN is unknown; it appears that it spent the latter part of its working life in Quebec before being retired in late 1958 and being stored in a deadline of locomotives in Montreal.

=== Green Mountain Railroad ===
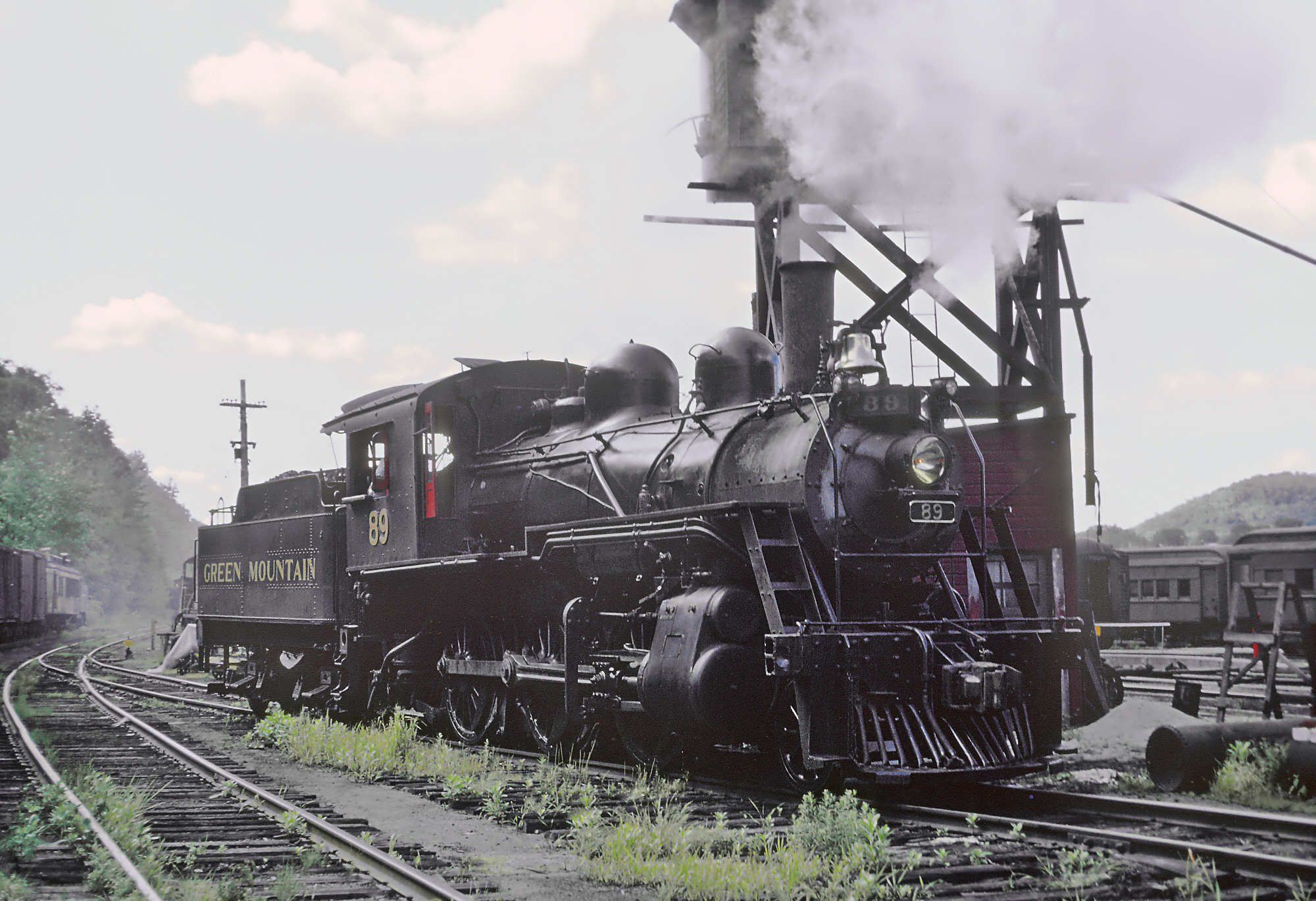
No. 89 on the Green Mountain Railroad in 1968

In 1961, No. 89 was purchased by New England seafood magnate and steam locomotive collector F. Nelson Blount for his Green Mountain Railroad (GMRC) and moved to North Walpole, New Hampshire, in the United States. No. 89 found a home in the former Boston & Maine North Walpole roundhouse. It was restored to operating condition on January 25, 1965, and began hauling GMRC excursion trains. It became Blount's favorite locomotive; he was often at the throttle before his death in 1967. No. 89 was later moved across the Connecticut River to Bellows Falls, Vermont, where it hauled excursion trains for Steamtown, U.S.A. for seven years.

=== Strasburg Rail Road ===
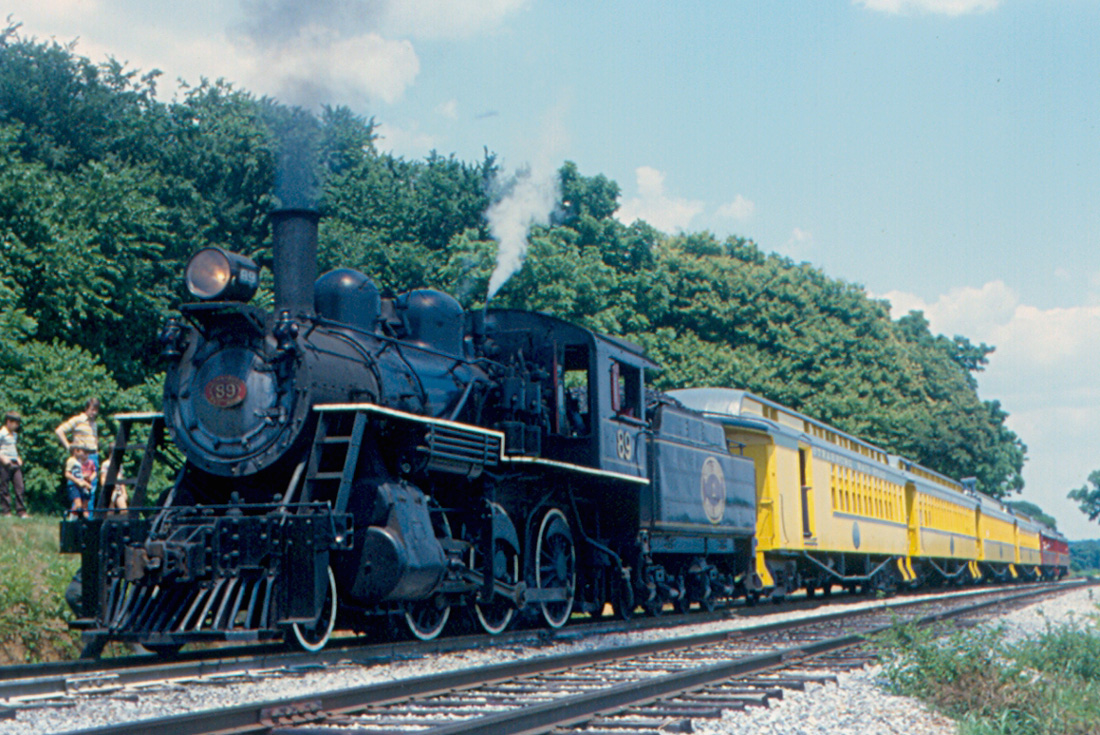
No. 89 hauls a excursion on the Strasburg Rail Road in 1979.

In June 1972, the GMRC sold No. 89 to the Strasburg Rail Road (SRC) outside Strasburg, Pennsylvania. The move from Bellows Falls to Strasburg was overseen by Strasburg employee Linn Moedinger. During a stopover in Penn Central's Buttonwood Yard in Wilkes-Barre, No. 89 was submerged when Hurricane Agnes caused the Susquehanna River to flood. After several days, No. 89 emerged all but undamaged.

It arrived at Strasburg on July 15, 1972, and was placed into service the following year on March 17, 1973. It faced east when hauling excursion trains until the turntable at the Railroad Museum of Pennsylvania was installed in late 1973. No. 89 frequently operated with Pennsylvania Railroad 4-4-0 No. 1223 on Strasburg's half-hour trains until it was taken out of service in the early 1980s. No. 89 was rebuilt with major boiler and running gear work. Emerging from its rebuild in November 1988, No. 89 returned to pulling the half-hour trains, being joined by former Norfolk & Western 4-8-0 No. 475 in 1993. In October 2003, No. 89 was modified and repainted to its 1950s Canadian National appearance with the tilted monogram logo. In 2008, No. 89's tender logo was re-lettered to read "Strasburg Rail Road," in keeping with Strasburg's policy of historical authenticity. On November 9-10, 2026, No. 89 was dressed up to look like a Boston and Maine B-15 class with the No. 1397.

== Appearances in media ==
- The locomotive appears at east Strasburg station in the 2012 History channel series The Men Who Built America l in multiple episodes.
- In 2013, the locomotive appeared in a live action segment of an episode of Daniel Tiger's Neighborhood titled "All Aboard." The Segment was filmed in October 2012.
- In 2022, the engine appeared in an episode of The Gilded Age entitled "Charity Has Two Functions," with an unlettered tender.

== See also ==
- Everett Railroad 11
- Great Western 90
- Norfolk and Western 475
- Canadian National 1009
- Canadian National 7312
- Canadian National 7470

== Bibliography ==
- Bell, Kurt; Plant, Jeremy (2015). Strasburg Rail Road In Color (1st ed.). Morning Sun Books. ISBN 978-1582484792.
- Conner, Eric; Barrall, Steve (2017). Strasburg Rail Road. Images of Rail (1st ed.). Arcadia Publishing. ISBN 978-1-4671-2507-9.
