= Hillsboro and Northeastern Railway =

Former railway

The Hillsboro and Northeastern Railway was a shortline railroad built around the turn of the 20th century to connect the village of Hillsboro to the main line of the Chicago and North Western Railway at Union Center, Wisconsin, about five miles distant. The line was abandoned in February 1987.

== Hillsboro State Trail ==
The abandoned right of way was turned into a recreational trail known as the Hillsboro State Trail or alternatively as the "Hillsboro Spur". The C & NW main line trackage at Union Center is now the 400 State Trail. The junction for the Hillsboro Spur to the 400 State Trail is just outside the southern edge of Union Center.
