= North Freedom, Wisconsin =

- Village
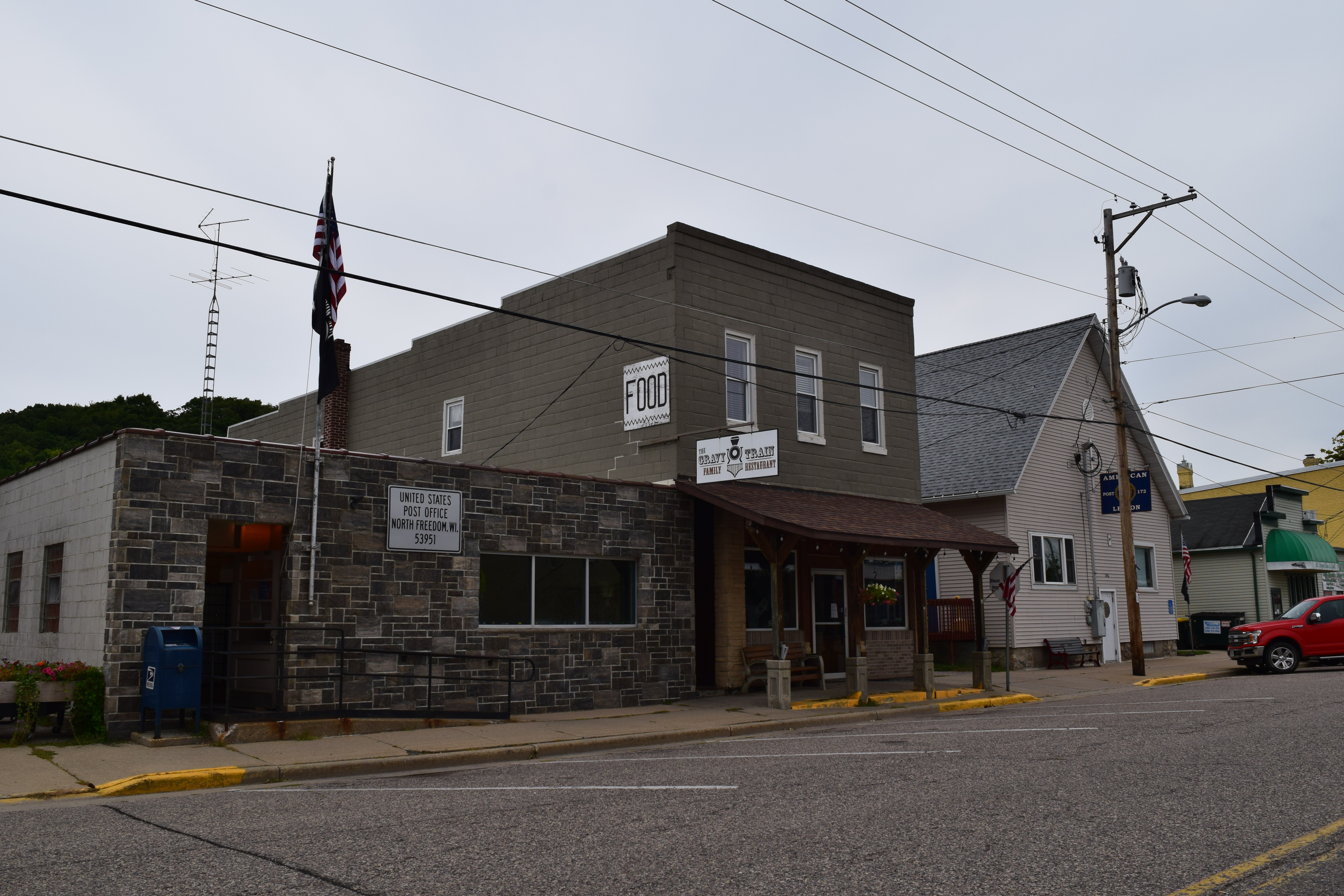
- Downtown North Freedom

- Location of North Freedom in Sauk County, Wisconsin.
- Coordinates: 43°27′39″N 89°51′57″W
- Country: United States
- State: Wisconsin
- County: Sauk
- Incorporated: November 25, 1893

Area
  - Total: 0.89 sq mi (2.31 km^{2})
  - Land: 0.84 sq mi (2.17 km^{2})
  - Water: 0.054 sq mi (0.14 km^{2})
- Elevation: 879 ft (268 m)

Population (2020)
  - Total: 603
  - Density: 720/sq mi (278/km^{2})
- Time zone: UTC-6 (Central (CST))
  - Summer (DST): UTC-5 (CDT)
- Area code: 608
- FIPS code: 55-58025
- GNIS feature ID: 1570440
- Website: https://vonf.wi.gov/

North Freedom is a village along the Baraboo River in Sauk County, Wisconsin, United States. Population was 603 as reported by the 2020 census.

== Etymology ==
North Freedom's name is rooted in the ideal of freedom alongside its position north of Baraboo River.

== Geography ==
North Freedom is located at 43°27′39″N 89°51′57″W (43.460843, -89.865862).

According to the United States Census Bureau, the village has a total area of 0.87 square miles (2.25 km^{2}); of which 0.81 square miles (2.10 km^{2}) is land and 0.06 square miles (0.16 km^{2}) is water.

== Demographics ==
Historical population
Census	Pop.	Note	%±
1890	316		—
1900	485		53.5%
1910	647		33.4%
1920	621		−4.0%
1930	554		−10.8%
1940	547		−1.3%
1950	611		11.7%
1960	579		−5.2%
1970	596		2.9%
1980	616		3.4%
1990	591		−4.1%
2000	649		9.8%
2010	701		8.0%
2020	603		−14.0%
U.S. Decennial Census

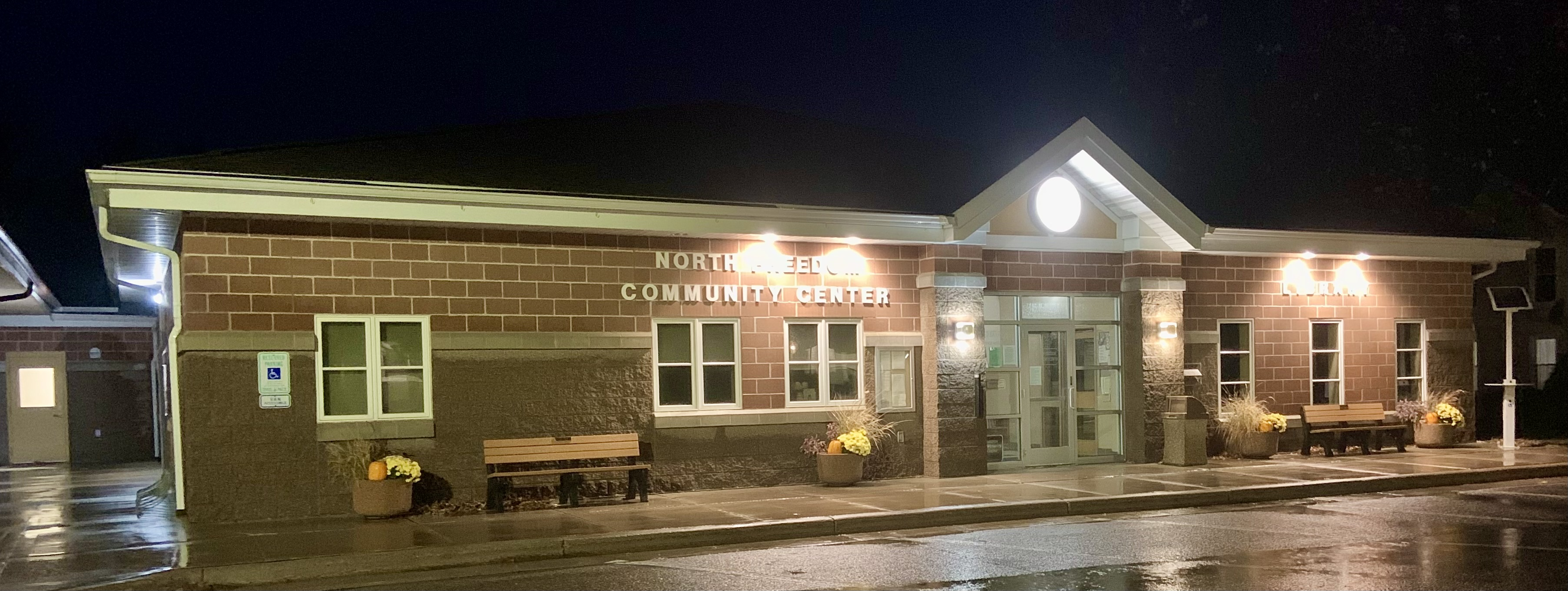
North Freedom Village Hall

=== 2010 census ===
As of the census of 2010, there were 701 people, 271 households, and 176 families living in the village. The population density was 865.4 inhabitants per square mile (334.1/km^{2}). There were 293 housing units at an average density of 361.7 per square mile (139.7/km^{2}). The racial makeup of the village was 97.1% White, 0.1% African American, 0.3% Native American, 0.4% Asian, 0.9% from other races, and 1.1% from two or more races. Hispanic or Latino of any race were 2.6% of the population.

There were 271 households, of which 35.8% had children under the age of 18 living with them, 46.5% were married couples living together, 11.4% had a female householder with no husband present, 7.0% had a male householder with no wife present, and 35.1% were non-families. 24.7% of all households were made up of individuals, and 8.9% had someone living alone who was 65 years of age or older. The average household size was 2.59 and the average family size was 3.03.

The median age in the village was 35.9 years. 29.7% of residents were under the age of 18; 4.9% were between the ages of 18 and 24; 31.2% were from 25 to 44; 24.4% were from 45 to 64; and 9.7% were 65 years of age or older. The gender makeup of the village was 53.2% male and 46.8% female.

=== 2000 census ===
As of the census of 2000, there were 649 people, 238 households, and 164 families living in the village. The population density was 745.9 people per square mile (288.0/km^{2}). There were 252 housing units at an average density of 289.6 per square mile (111.8/km^{2}). The racial makeup of the village was 98.31% White, 0.77% Native American, and 0.92% from two or more races. Hispanic or Latino of any race were 1.08% of the population.

There were 238 households, out of which 39.1% had children under the age of 18 living with them, 58.4% were married couples living together, 5.9% had a female householder with no husband present, and 30.7% were non-families. 25.6% of all households were made up of individuals, and 11.8% had someone living alone who was 65 years of age or older. The average household size was 2.73 and the average family size was 3.28.

In the village, the population was spread out, with 30.7% under the age of 18, 7.1% from 18 to 24, 31.4% from 25 to 44, 18.5% from 45 to 64, and 12.3% who were 65 years of age or older. The median age was 33 years. For every 100 females, there were 102.8 males. For every 100 females age 18 and over, there were 93.1 males.

The median income for a household in the village was $37,273, and the median income for a family was $41,818. Males had a median income of $32,500 versus $20,000 for females. The per capita income for the village was $14,354. About 5.4% of families and 11.3% of the population were below the poverty line, including 8.5% of those under age 18 and 10.1% of those age 65 or over.

== Education ==
North Freedom is within the Baraboo School District, which operates North Freedom Elementary School, Young Middle School in Baraboo, Baraboo High School.

North Freedom Elementary School opened in 1902. In 1976 it had the value of $147,000 and was the only elementary school that the district was using that had not been built within 30 years prior. A new elementary school building began use in 1991.

The Baraboo School District absorbed other school districts in 1961–1962. Prior to that time, people outside of the City of Baraboo had to pay tuition to send children to Baraboo High.

== Notable people ==
- Samuel Northrup (1801–1860), Wisconsin State Representative; resided in nearby Dellona, is buried in North Freedom.
- Algie Martin Simons (1870–1950), Socialist journalist and editor, born and raised on a farm near North Freedom.
- Chester D. Seftenberg (1904-1970), Wisconsin State Representative; was born in North Freedom.

== Attractions ==
- Forevertron
- Mid-Continent Railway Museum

== See also ==
- Badger Army Ammunition Plant
- List of villages in Wisconsin
- Freedom, Sauk County, Wisconsin
