= Baldwin Class 10-34-E =

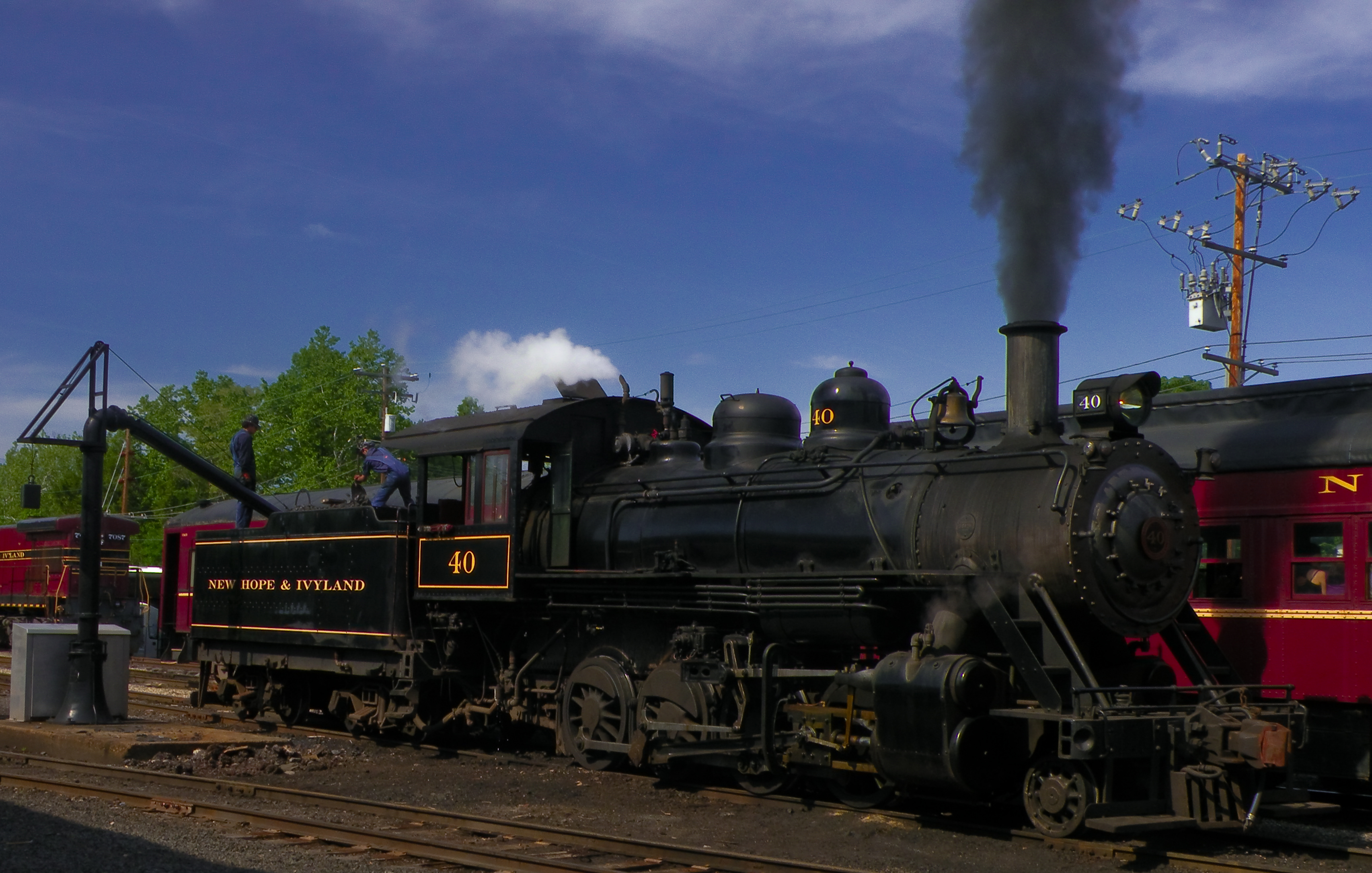
- No. 40 taking on water on the New Hope Railroad, May 21, 2009
Type and origin
- Power type: Steam
- Designer: Baldwin Locomotive Works
- Builder: Baldwin Locomotive Works; American Locomotive Company; Rogers Locomotive and Machine Works
- Model: 10-34-E
- Build date: 1883–1925
Specifications
- Configuration
  - Whyte: 2-8-0
  - UIC: 1′D n2
- Gauge: 4 ft 8 1/2 in (1,435 mm)
- Driver dia.: 50 in (1.270 m)
- Adhesive weight: 142,000 lb (64.4 tonnes)
- Loco weight: 160,000 lb (72.6 tonnes)
- Fuel type: Coal
- Fuel capacity: 16,000 lb (7.3 tonnes)
- Water cap.: 6,000 US gallons (23,000 L; 5,000 imp gal)
- Boiler pressure: 190 lbf/in^{2} (1.31 MPa)
- Feedwater heater: None
- Superheater: None
- Cylinders: Two, outside
- Cylinder size: 20 in × 26 in (508 mm × 660 mm)
- Valve gear: Walschaerts
- Valve type: Piston valves
- Train heating: Steam
- Train brakes: 6ET
Performance figures
- Maximum speed: 45 mph (72 km/h)
- Tractive effort: 32,700 lbf (145 kN)
Career
- Operators: Cresson, Clearfield County and New York Short Route Railroad; Great Northern Railway; Northern Construction Company; Fernwood Lumber Company; Rahway Valley Railroad; Louisiana Railway and Navigation Company; Tennessee, Alabama and Georgia Railway; Lancaster and Chester Railroad; Cliffside Railroad; New Hope Railroad
- Class: 10-34-E
- Numbers: 15; 40; 75; 99; 201; 1147; 1246
- Preserved: Seven
- Disposition: Seven preserved, remainder scrapped

The Baldwin Class 10-34-E is a class of 2-8-0 steam locomotives that were designed and built by the Baldwin Locomotive Works and in a collaboration with the American Locomotive Company, and the Rogers Locomotive and Machine Works.

Several of these locomotives were all built for multiple railroads all across the United States of America between 1883 and 1925.

== History ==
Between October 1901 and December 1907, Great Northern Railway ordered a total of 125 locomotives, and operated them in service until the mid 1950s. They operated throughout the GN's system pulling freight trains with some being rebuilt with larger cylinders and higher boiler pressure, giving them more tractive effort. The Great Northern Railway retired the F-8s between 1932 and 1956.

The Fernwood Lumber Company ordered two locomotives and numbered them as 11 and 12. Both were sold to the Fernwood and Gulf Railroad in 1916 with no. 11 operating on the F&G and then sold to the Fernwood, Columbia and Gulf Railroad in 1920. Meanwhile no. 12 operating on the F&G, then sold to the J. J. White Lumber Company and the Kentucky Lumber Company in 1928, then sold to the Birmingham Rail and Locomotive Company and then sold to the FC&G in 1937. Both locomotives were scrapped in 1947.

== Original buyers ==
Railroad	Quantity	Class	Road numbers	Build date	Refs
Cresson, Clearfield County and New York Short Route Railroad	1	-	4	December 1889	
Great Northern Railway	125	F-8	1140–1264	October 1901 – December 1907	
Northern Construction Company	1	-	75	September 1907	
Fernwood Lumber Company	2	-	11–12	1912	
Rahway Valley Railroad	1	-	15	June 1916	
Louisiana Railway and Navigation Company	1	-	99	September 1919	
Tennessee, Alabama and Georgia Railway	1	201	201	1924	
Lancaster and Chester Railroad	1	-	40	December 2, 1925	

== Preservation ==
Photograph	Locomotive	Works No.	Build date	Builder	Former operator(s)	Status	Refs
	Great Northern 1147	5796	August 1902	ALCO	Great Northern Railway	On static display at Wenatchee, Washington	
	Heber Valley Railroad 75	31778	September 1907	BLW	Northern Construction Company; Great Western Railway; Singing Rails, Inc.	Undergoing restoration at the Heber Valley Railroad in Heber City, Utah	
	Great Northern 1246	32297	1907	BLW	Great Northern Railway	Stored, awaiting restoration at the Northwest Railway Museum in Snoqualmie, Washington	
	Rahway Valley 15	43529	June 1916	BLW	Oneida and Western Railroad; Rahway Valley Railroad; Green Mountain Railroad	On static display at the Steamtown National Historic Site in Scranton, Pennsylvania	
	Louisiana and Arkansas 99	52292	September 1919	BLW	Louisiana Railway and Navigation Company; Louisiana and Arkansas Railroad	On static display at the Illinois Railway Museum in Union, Illinois.	
	Tennessee, Alabama and Georgia 201	57707	1924	BLW	Tennessee, Alabama and Georgia Railway	On static display at the Southeastern Railway Museum in Duluth, Georgia	
	New Hope Railroad 40	58824	December 2, 1925	BLW	Lancaster and Chester Railroad; Cliffside Railroad	Operational at the New Hope Railroad in New Hope, Pennsylvania	

== See also ==
- Baldwin Class 10-32-D
- Baldwin Class 10-12-D
- Baldwin Class 12-42-F
