= Traymore station =

Traymore station could refer to:

- Traymore station (PAAC), a disused light rail station in Pittsburgh, Pennsylvania
- Traymore station (Reading Railroad), a disused train station in Bucks County, Pennsylvania
