= New Hope Railroad 40 =

Preserved American 2-8-0 steam locomotive

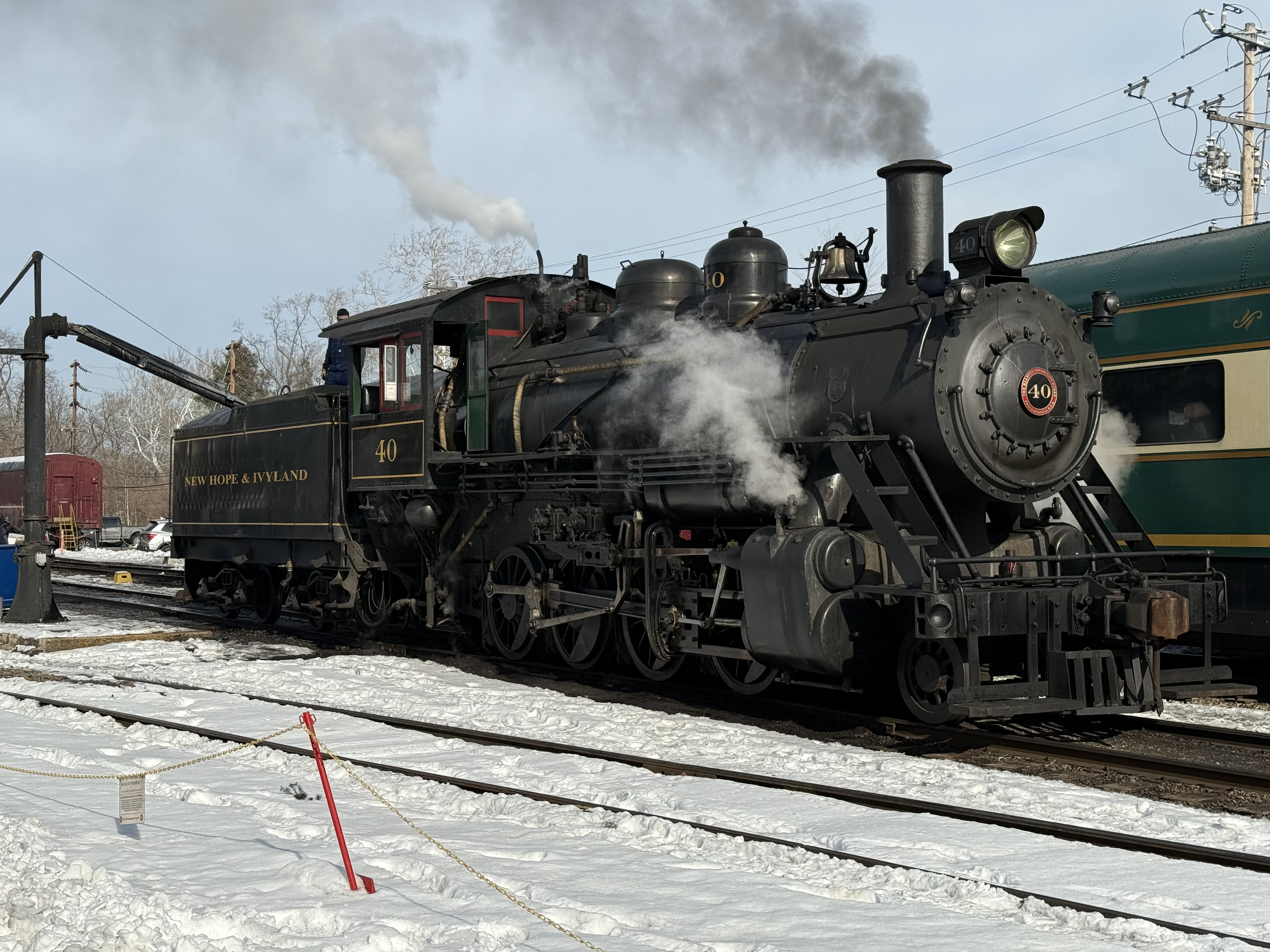
- No. 40 preparing to pull Santa's Steam Train at the New Hope Station, December 2025
Type and origin
- Power type: Steam
- Builder: Baldwin Locomotive Works
- Serial number: 58824
- Model: 10-34-E
- Build date: December 1925
Specifications
- Configuration
  - Whyte: 2-8-0
  - UIC: 1′D n2
- Gauge: 4 ft 8 1/2 in (1,435 mm)
- Driver dia.: 50 in (1.270 m)
- Adhesive weight: 142,000 lb (64.4 tonnes)
- Loco weight: 160,000 lb (72.6 tonnes)
- Fuel type: Coal
- Fuel capacity: 16,000 lb (7.3 tonnes)
- Water cap.: 6,000 US gallons (23,000 L; 5,000 imp gal)
- Boiler pressure: 190 lbf/in^{2} (1.31 MPa)
- Feedwater heater: None
- Superheater: None
- Cylinders: Two, outside
- Cylinder size: 20 in × 26 in (508 mm × 660 mm)
- Valve gear: Walschaerts
- Valve type: Piston valves
- Train heating: Steam
- Loco brake: Air
- Train brakes: 6ET
- Couplers: Knuckle
Performance figures
- Maximum speed: 45 mph (72 km/h)
- Tractive effort: 32,700 lbf (145 kN)
Career
- Operators: Lancaster and Chester Railroad; Cliffside Railroad; New Hope Railroad
- Class: 10-34-E
- Numbers: LC 40; CRR 40; NHRR 40
- Nicknames: Old Number 40; Baldwin 40; The Big Engine (By Cliffside Railroad)
- Retired: July 20, 1962
- Restored: August 6, 1966
- Current owner: New Hope Railroad
- Disposition: Undergoing 1,472-day inspection and overhaul

New Hope Railroad 40 is a 10-34-E class 2-8-0 "Consolidation" type steam locomotive, built in December 1925 by the Baldwin Locomotive Works (BLW) for the Lancaster and Chester Railroad (LC) in Lancaster, South Carolina. No. 40 is the only operating steam locomotive on the New Hope Railroad (NHRR) in New Hope, Pennsylvania.

== History ==
=== Lancaster and Chester Railroad ===
No. 40 was built by the Baldwin Locomotive Works (BLW) in December 1925, for the Lancaster and Chester Railroad (LC) of Lancaster, South Carolina for the price of $25,125.96. Being one of the railroad's largest engines, it was put on the main train from Lancaster to Catawba. In later years, No. 40 would be relegated to a backup locomotive.

=== Cliffside Railroad ===
In 1947, after the L&C began retiring all of their steam locomotives in favor of modern diesel locomotives, No. 40 was retired and sold to the Cliffside Railroad (CRR), a short line in North Carolina. Like the L&C, the Cliffside was predominantly a textile hauler. During its entire tenure on the Cliffside, the relatively diminutive 80-ton 2-8-0 was the largest locomotive the railroad owned, earning it the nickname, "The Big Engine".

However, the locomotive was not used much as it was often overpowered for the small switching jobs and sharp track, compared to the smaller 2-6-2 also owned by the railroad. Despite No. 40 being refurbished by the Cliffside, it was retired from revenue service again on July 20, 1962 and sold to Steam Trains Inc., located in New Hope, Pennsylvania.

=== New Hope Railroad ===
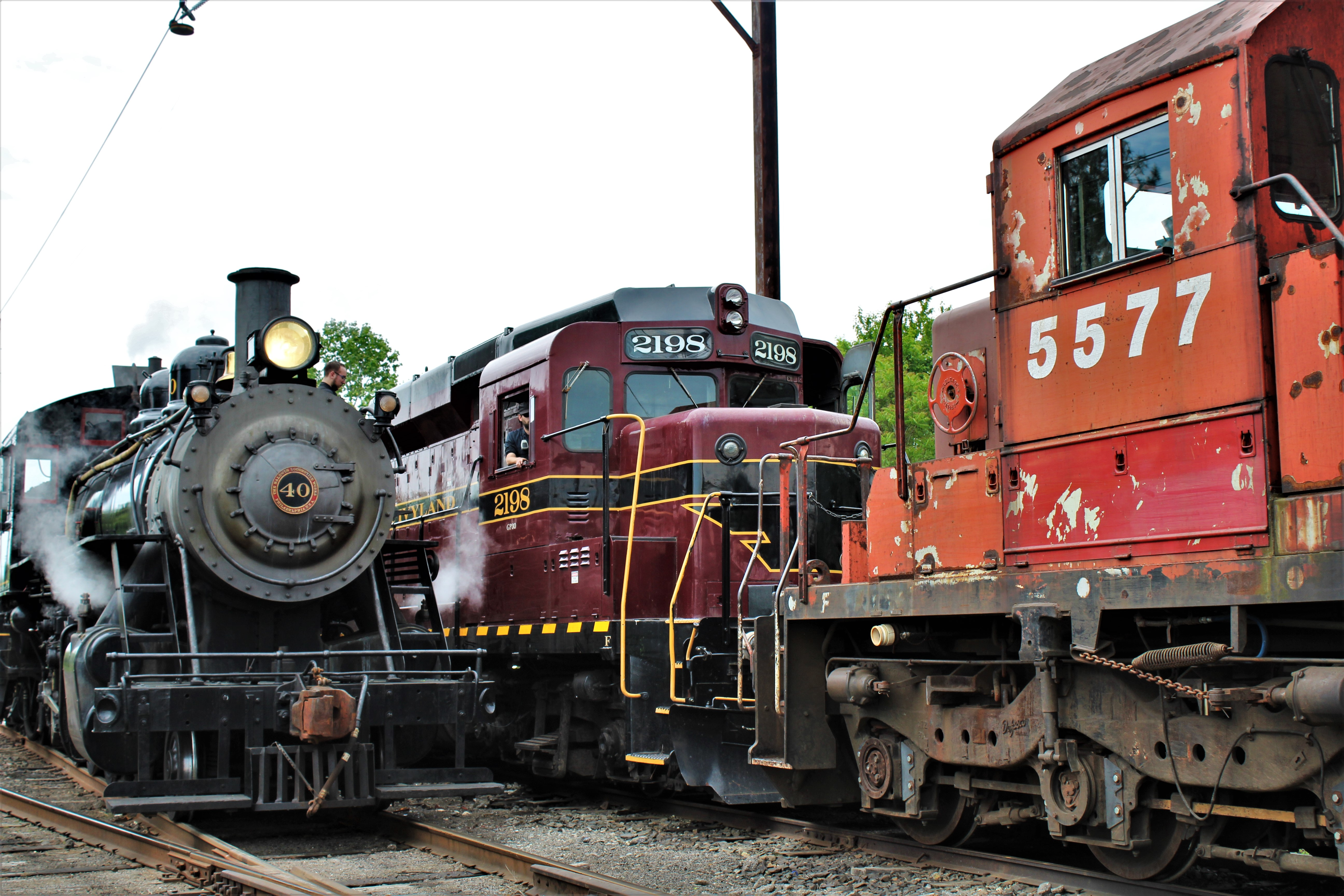
No. 40 with NHRR No. 2198 and CP 5577, May 17, 2019

No. 40 was the first piece of equipment purchased by the Steam Trains Inc. group, in hoping to find a branch line to run it on. No. 40 was initially moved to Reading Company's yard in Wilmington, Delaware. The company initially planned to use the former Reading Company branchline located between Bridgeport, NJ and East Falls, PA. However, the Reading would be taken over by Conrail, and later, the Norfolk Southern would use the branchline other services. Fortunately, the Reading had another branchline that they had not used since 1954. The company decided to settle their operations in New Hope, PA. In the process, the company was renamed the New Hope & Ivyland Railroad (NHRR). The No. 40 was then moved to the Reading Company shops in St. Clair, Pennsylvania with the rest of Steam Trains Inc.'s equipment.

In 1966, Steam Trains Inc. was reorganized as the New Hope Railroad and moved all of its equipment, including 40, to the former Reading Company yard in New Hope, Pennsylvania. Throughout the mid-summer move, No. 40 was dead into tow, with No. 1533 provided the motive power for the entire equipment move from St. Clair, Pennsylvania to New Hope, Pennsylvania. No. 40 was ready for service by August 1966, and with ex-Canadian National 4-6-0 No. 1533, began running excursion trains on the line.

Although No. 40 was operational at the time, it remained mostly a static display and was sidelined as a backup engine due to No. 1533 reportedly being more easier to run and fire and was more popular with engine crews. No. 40 only saw limited service in the summer of 1967 when No. 1533 would be taken out of service for repairs, after that, the locomotive was withdrawn from service and put into storage for the next seven years. On October 18, 1974, No. 40 was rebuilt by the New Hope and Ivyland Railroad's new owners the McHugh Brothers and returned to service, operating alongside No. 1533 including double-header trips from October until December 1975 when No. 1533 was taken out of service for a major overhaul.

By August 1976, No. 40 would operate alongside the railroad's third engine, former US Army 0-6-0 No. 9, which was recently restored again and replaced No. 1533. In the late 1970s, No. 40 would share excursion responsibilities with No. 9 into the early 1980s, and would operate both on and off home rails. During this time, the locomotive was the main workhorse for the railroad, alongside No. 9. One of its offline runs took place in 1985 when it ventured down to the Fairless Works of U.S. Steel in nearby Morrisville, Pennsylvania as part of a weekend-long open house for plant employees and their families. In 1986, No. 40 was taken out of service for repairs, while diesel engines took its place hauling passenger excursion trains for the next four years, however, it would remain in storage for the next five years.

In 1990, the New Hope and Ivyland Railroad, now New Hope Railroad, came under new ownership and No. 40 was rebuilt by shop forces from the Strasburg Rail Road, returning to service once again in June 1991. In October 2004, No. 40 was backdated to its Cliffside Railroad appearance for Jim Gunning and John Craft's Cliffside Railroad mixed freight photo charter. In early 2011, No. 40 was removed from service to undergo its Federal Railroad Administration (FRA) 1,472-day inspection and overhaul, it return to service on December 7, 2011. In May and June of 2013, No. 40 was backdated to its Lancaster and Chester Railroad appearance for several Lerro Productions mixed freight photo charters.

On May 18, 2019, No. 40 powered four excursions over the SEPTA Lansdale/Doylestown Line in Montgomery County between North Wales and Gwynedd Valley, Pennsylvania as part of North Wales Borough's Sesquicentennial celebrations. This would be the locomotive's first trip on the mainline since 1985. The locomotive holds the claim as the only operational steam locomotive on the railroad.

On December 27, 2025, No. 40 was removed from service to undergo another FRA inspection and is expected to be completed on December 27, 2026.

== See also ==
- Southern Railway 385
- Great Western 60
- Great Western 90
- Valley Railroad 40
- Arcade and Attica 18
- Canadian National 89
- Canadian National 7470
- Lake Superior and Ishpeming 18
- Reading Blue Mountain and Northern Railroad 425
- Woodstown Central 9
