= Baldwin Class 12-42-F =

Class of Baldwin-built 2-10-0 "Decapod" steam locomotives

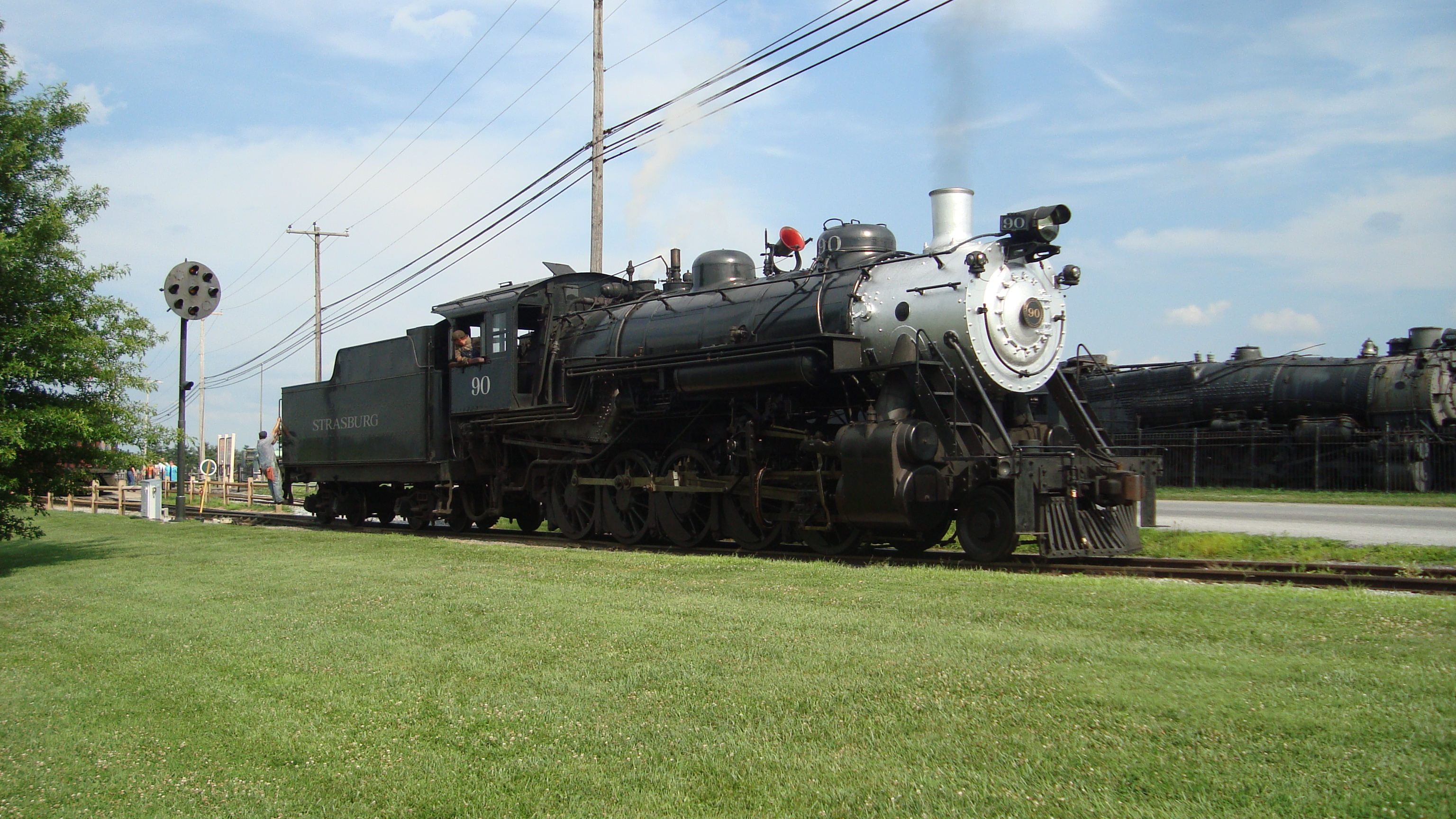
- Great Western 90 on the Strasburg Rail Road, July 18, 2014
Type and origin
- Power type: Steam
- Builder: Baldwin Locomotive Works
- Model: 12-42-F
- Build date: 1924–1930
- Total produced: 22
Specifications
- Configuration
  - Whyte: 2-10-0
- Gauge: 4 ft 8 1/2 in (1,435 mm)
- Loco weight: 106.5 t (235,000 lb)
- Tender weight: 68.75 t (151,600 lb)
- Total weight: 175.25 t (386,400 lb)
- Fuel type: Coal
- Boiler pressure: 200 psi (1.4 MPa; 1,400 kPa)
- Cylinders: Two, outside
- Cylinder size: 24 in × 28 in (610 mm × 710 mm)
Career
- Operators: Alabama, Tennessee and Northern Railroad; Seaboard Air Line Railroad; Georgia Florida and Alabama Railroad; Great Western Railroad and Sugar Company; Great Western Railway of Colorado; Durham and Southern Railroad; Strasburg Rail Road
- Class: 12-42-F
- Numbers: 401–403; 529–536; 202–209; 90
- Disposition: Five preserved, remainder scrapped

The Baldwin Class 12-42-F was a class of 2-10-0 "Decapod" type steam locomotives that were built by the Baldwin Locomotive Works for only four railroads all across the United States of America between 1924 and 1930.

== History ==
=== Construction and revenue service ===
In the early 1920s, the Georgia Florida and Alabama Railroad approached the Baldwin Locomotive Works to construct a locomotive identical to the Russian Decapod design from World War I, as the railroad was in search of powerful locomotives that would be light enough to negotiate their 56-pound (0.028-short-ton) trackage. Baldwin modified the Russian design by increasing its weight, changing the driving wheel diameter from 52 inches (1,300 mm) to 56 inches (1,400 mm), and alternating the cab and dome designs.

In March 1924, two locomotives of Baldwin’s new design, classified as the 12-42-F, were delivered to the GF&A. Three months later, in June, the Great Western Railroad and Sugar Company of Colorado, ordered one copy of the design, No. 90. By September 1933, nineteen more 12-42-Fs were built and delivered to other railroads; three (Nos. 401-403) were sold to the Alabama, Tennessee and Northern, three were sold to the Durham and Southern, one was sold to the Oklahoma-based Osage Railway, eight (Nos. 529-536) were sold to the Seaboard Air Line Railroad, and four more were sold to the GF&A.

In 1948, the Seaboard Air Line acquired the GF&A, and they obtained ownership of their decapods, in the process. The railroad was so impressed with them, that they decided to order eight more 2-10-0s (Nos. 202–209) of relatively the same design.

Locomotive No. 90, which was operated by the GW, was rebuilt with some modifications, after each of its incidents on the railroad; after pulling other locomotives out of a roundhouse fire in 1940, No. 90 had its pumps and running boards rearranged; after getting broadsided by a truck at a crossing in 1944, No. 90 received an extended smokebox for help burning lignite coal. The extended smokebox was later removed in the 1990s, during No. 90’s excursion career on the Strasburg Rail Road in Pennsylvania.

=== Design ===
The 12-42-F locomotives were designed with 56-inch (1,400 mm) diameter driving wheels, a boiler pressure of 200 psi (1.4 MPa; 1,400 kPa), and 24-inch x 28-inch (610-mm x 710mm) cylinders, creating a tractive effort of 48,960 pounds-force (217.8 kN). The driving wheels were designed to tenderly spread the locomotive’s weight for minimum axle loading, and it permitted the 12-42-Fs to travel over light-weight trackage. Most of them weighed in at 106 t (234,000 lb), but the heaviest of the class weighed 127 t (280,000 lb). Their tenders were designed to hold 18 short tons (36,000 lb) of coal and 8,500 U.S. gallons (32,000 L) of water, but most compromised with 10 short tons (20,000 lb) of coal and 7,000 U.S. gallons (26,000 L) of water.

== Original buyers ==
Railroad	Quantity	Class	Road numbers	Refs
Alabama, Tennessee and Northern Railroad	1	401	401–403	
Durham and Southern Railroad	3	200	200–202	
Great Western Railway of Colorado	1	90	90	
Seaboard Air Line Railroad	8	D-3	529–536	

== Preservation ==
In all, five 12-42-F locomotives are preserved.

Photograph	Locomotive	Works No.	Build date	Operator	Status	Refs
	Great Western 90	57812	June 1924	Great Western Railroad and Sugar Company; Strasburg Rail Road	Operational	(Note: See Great Western 90)
	Alabama, Tennessee and Northern Railroad 401	60341	January 1928	Alabama, Tennessee and Northern Railroad	On static display	
	Gainesville Midland 203	60342	January 1928	Woodard Iron Company; Gainesville Midland	On static display	
	Gainesville Midland 208	61230	March 1930	Seaboard Air Line Railroad; Gainesville Midland	On static display	
	Gainesville Midland 209	61233	March 1930	Seaboard Air Line Railroad; Gainesville Midland	On static display	

== See also ==
- Baldwin Class 10-34-E
- Baldwin Class 10-32-D
- Baldwin Class 10-12-D
