= Rahway Valley 15 =

Preserved 2-8-0 10-34-E class locomotive

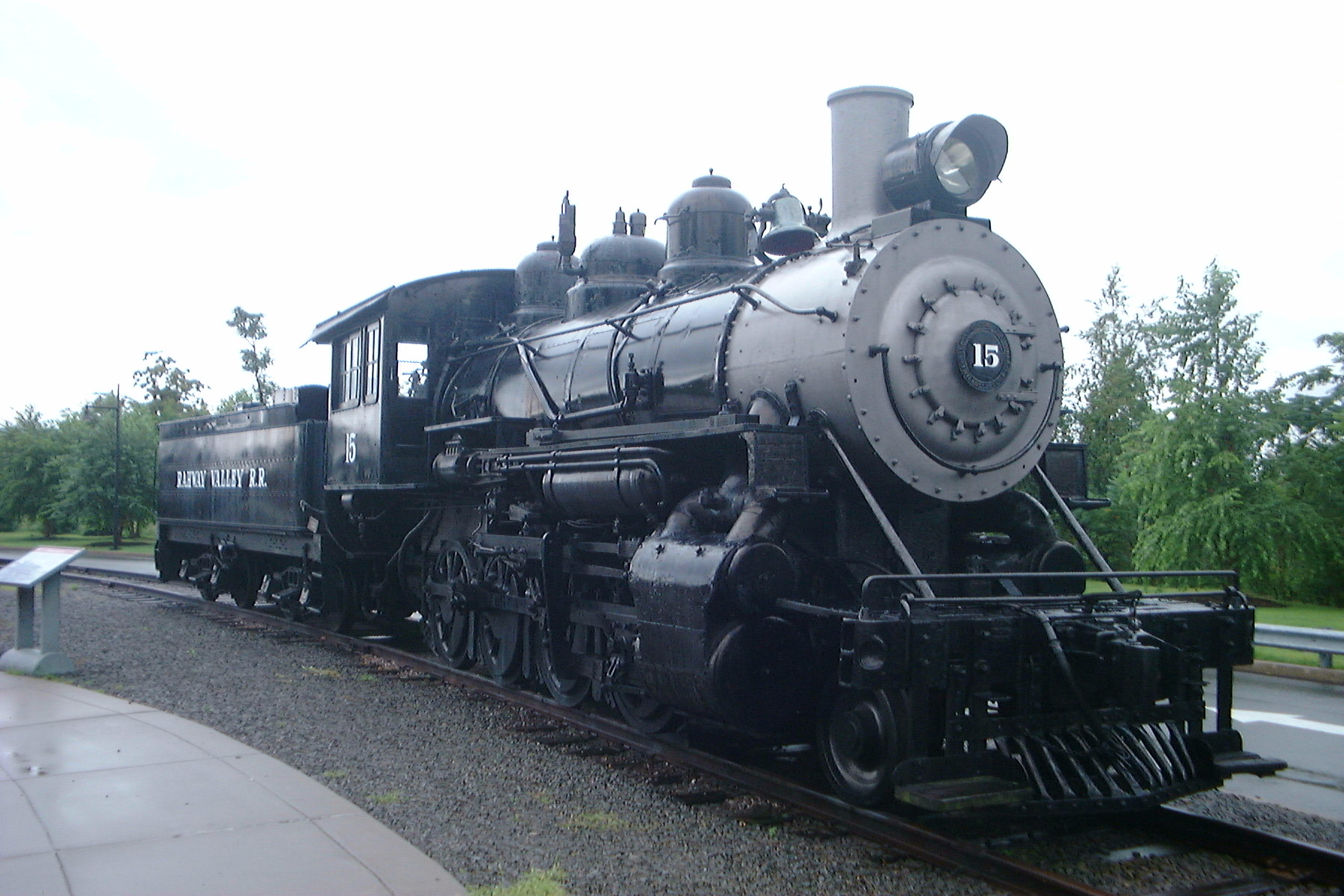
- Rahway Valley Railroad No. 15 on display in 2003
Type and origin
- Power type: Steam
- Builder: Baldwin Locomotive Works
- Serial number: 43529
- Model: 10-34-E
- Build date: June 1916
Specifications
- Configuration
  - Whyte: 2-8-0
  - UIC: 1′D n2G
- Gauge: 4 ft 8 1/2 in (1,435 mm)
- Driver dia.: 50 in (1,270 mm)
- Adhesive weight: 127,700 lb (57.9 tonnes)
- Loco weight: 146,000 lb (66.2 tonnes)
- Fuel type: Coal
- Fuel capacity: 6 short tons (5.4 tonnes)
- Water cap.: 3,500 US gal (13,000 L; 2,900 imp gal)
- Boiler pressure: 200 psi (1.38 MPa)
- Cylinders: Two, outside
- Cylinder size: 20 in × 26 in (508 mm × 660 mm)
- Valve gear: Walschaerts
- Valve type: Built: Slide valves; Rebuilt: Outside-admission piston valves
- Loco brake: Air
- Train brakes: Air
- Couplers: Knuckle
Performance figures
- Tractive effort: 33,350 lbf (148.3 kN)
- Factor of adh.: 4.16
Career
- Operators: Oneida and Western Railroad; Rahway Valley Railroad; Green Mountain Railroad; Steamtown, U.S.A.
- Class: 10-34-E
- Numbers: O&W 20; RVRR 15
- Nicknames: Faithful Fifteen
- Locale: Tennessee, New Jersey
- Retired: November 28, 1953 (revenue service); August 12, 1973 (excursion service)
- Preserved: May 1959
- Restored: 1962 (1st excursion service); 1987 (cosmetically)
- Current owner: Steamtown National Historic Site
- Disposition: On static display

Rahway Valley Railroad 15 is a 10-34-E class 2-8-0 "Consolidation" type steam locomotive, built by the Baldwin Locomotive Works (BLW) in June 1916 as Oneida and Western Railroad No. 20. As of 2023, the locomotive is on display at Steamtown National Historic Site (NHS).

== History ==
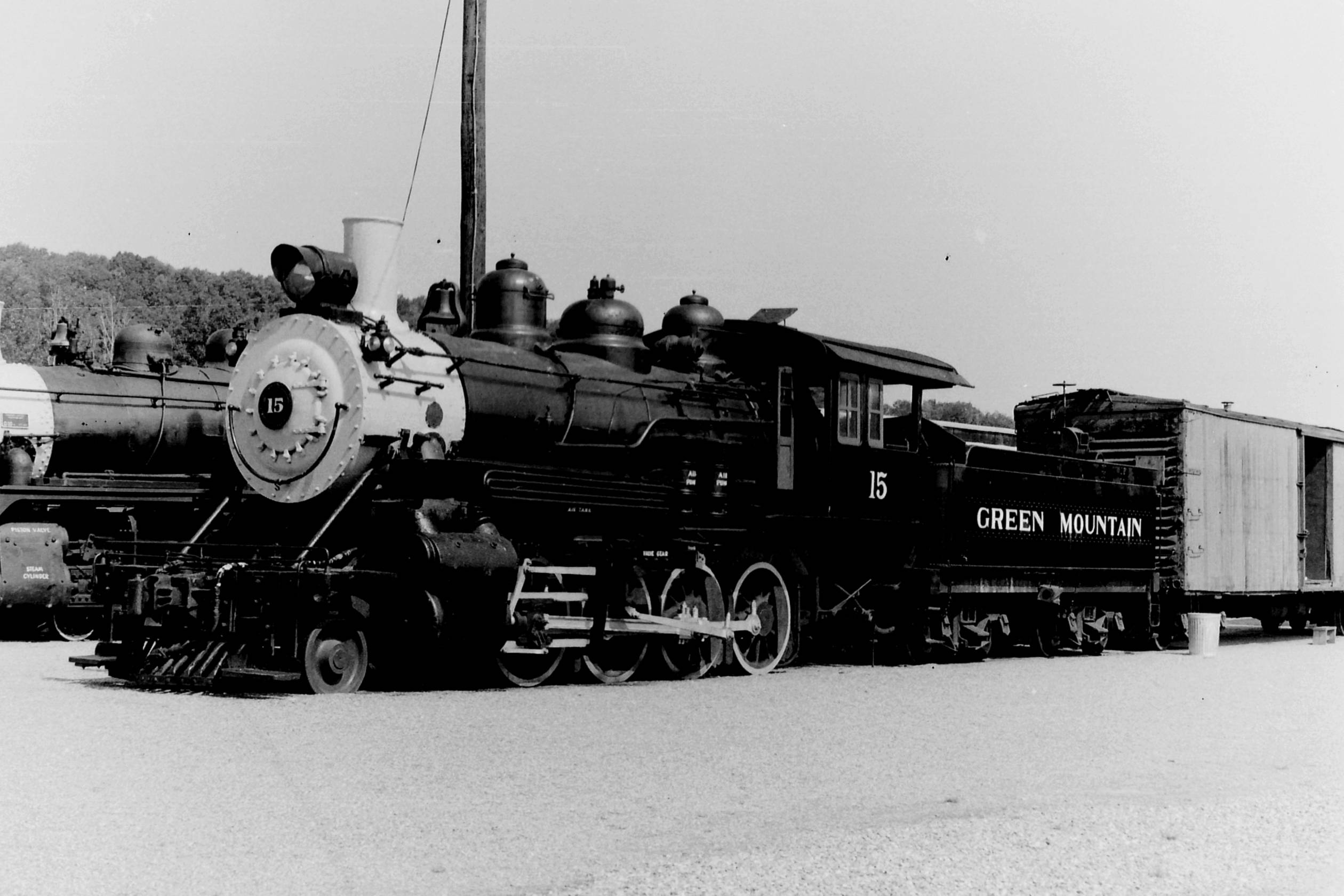
No. 15 on display at Steamtown USA in Bellows Falls, Vermont in August 1970

No. 15 was built in June 1916 by the Baldwin Locomotive Works (BLW) as Oneida and Western Railroad No. 20. In 1926, No. 20 suffered freeze damage to its bridges when a hostler accidentally left it outside overnight, necessitating its return to Baldwin for repairs. While at Baldwin, 20's slide valve cylinders were replaced with piston valve cylinders.

No. 20 was sold to the Rahway Valley Railroad (RV) in 1937 and renumbered to 15. It last ran in revenue service on November 28, 1953, before being replaced by #17 a GE 70-ton switcher. The President of the Railroad, George Clark, did not wish to see No. 15 scrapped however. It was placed in heated undercover storage pending further development for the next six years; at one point it was hoped the engine would be put on public display in Kenilworth, New Jersey, but space surrounding the railroad was limited.

It was donated to F. Nelson Blount in May 1959 and was received at Wakefield, Massachusetts on June 5 that year. Blount chose to restore the locomotive and operate it at Steamtown, U.S.A. in 1962. It also travelled to Boston to be filmed in The Cardinal. The locomotive later became part of the Green Mountain Railroad (GMRC) following the formation of that railroad. It remained under the Green Mountain name until 1973 and was later reverted to Rahway Valley No. 15.

No. 15's last run was on August 12, 1973, when a boiler tube blew out, scalding Andy Barbera, who was operating as the locomotive engineer at the time. Since the services of the locomotive were not needed at the time, the repairs were not done and remained undone by the time the Steamtown Special History was written.

The Steamtown Special History Study recommended that the engine be cosmetically and operationally restored, as it had served in the northeastern quarter of the United States and had been serviced, at least once, at the Lackawanna's Scranton shop.

As of 2023, the locomotive is still displayed and inoperable at Steamtown National Historic Site. There aren't any plans to restore 15 to operation anytime soon.
