= Fernwood, Mississippi =

- Census-designated place
- Location within Mississippi Location within the United States
- Coordinates: 31°11′08″N 90°26′56″W
- Country: United States
- State: Mississippi
- County: Pike

Area
  - Total: 1.99 sq mi (5.15 km^{2})
  - Land: 1.98 sq mi (5.14 km^{2})
  - Water: 0.0039 sq mi (0.01 km^{2})
- Elevation: 390 ft (120 m)

Population (2020)
  - Total: 286
  - Density: 144.1/sq mi (55.64/km^{2})
- Time zone: UTC-6 (Central (CST))
  - Summer (DST): UTC-5 (CDT)
- ZIP code: 39635
- Area codes: 601 & 769
- GNIS feature ID: 669950

Fernwood is a census-designated place (CDP) and unincorporated community in Pike County, Mississippi, United States. Its ZIP code is 39635.

Per the 2020 Census, the population was 286.

== Demographics ==
Historical population
Census	Pop.	Note	%±
2020	286		—
U.S. Decennial Census; 2020

Fernwood was first listed as a census designated place in the 2020 U.S. census.

=== 2020 census ===
Fernwood CDP, Mississippi – Racial and ethnic composition Note: the US Census treats Hispanic/Latino as an ethnic category. This table excludes Latinos from the racial categories and assigns them to a separate category. Hispanics/Latinos may be of any race.
Race / Ethnicity (NH = Non-Hispanic)	Pop 2020	% 2020
White alone (NH)	189	66.08%
Black or African American alone (NH)	75	26.22%
Native American or Alaska Native alone (NH)	0	0.00%
Asian alone (NH)	1	0.35%
Native Hawaiian or Pacific Islander alone (NH)	0	0.00%
Other race alone (NH)	1	0.35%
Mixed race or Multiracial (NH)	14	4.90%
Hispanic or Latino (any race)	6	2.10%
Total	286	100.00%

== History ==
Fernwood was developed in the late 1880s by the Enochs family as a company town for Fernwood Lumber Company.

== Geography ==
=== Climate ===
The climate at Fernwood is characterized by relatively high temperatures and evenly distributed precipitation throughout the year. The Köppen Climate Classification subtype for this climate is "Cfa". (Humid Subtropical Climate).

Climate data for Fernwood, Mississippi
Month	Jan	Feb	Mar	Apr	May	Jun	Jul	Aug	Sep	Oct	Nov	Dec	Year
Mean daily maximum °C (°F)	15 (59)	17 (63)	21 (70)	25 (77)	29 (84)	32 (90)	33 (91)	33 (91)	31 (87)	26 (79)	21 (69)	16 (61)	25 (77)
Mean daily minimum °C (°F)	3 (38)	4 (40)	8 (46)	12 (54)	17 (62)	20 (68)	21 (70)	21 (70)	18 (65)	12 (54)	7 (45)	4 (40)	12 (54)
Average precipitation mm (inches)	140 (5.7)	140 (5.5)	150 (5.9)	130 (5.3)	130 (5.1)	120 (4.7)	140 (5.5)	130 (5.2)	110 (4.4)	84 (3.3)	110 (4.3)	150 (5.8)	1,540 (60.7)
Source: Weatherbase

== Education ==
It is in the South Pike School District.

Pike County is in the district of Southwest Mississippi Community College.

== Notable person ==
- Ken Carter, business owner, education activist, former high school basketball coach, and inspiration for the film Coach Carter
