= Cliffside Railroad =

Former railroad in North Carolina, US

Overview
- Headquarters: Cliffside, North Carolina
- Reporting mark: CRR
- Locale: North Carolina
- Dates of operation: 1905–1992

Technical
- Track gauge: 4 ft 8 1/2 in (1,435 mm) standard gauge
- Length: 3.7 miles (6.0 km)

Cliffside Railroad was a Class III railroad operating freight service in southwestern North Carolina from 1905 until service ended in 1987. The line was formally abandoned in 1992.

== History ==
The Cliffside Railroad Company was incorporated on March 2, 1905, and the 3.7-mile railroad line was opened between Cliffside, North Carolina to Cliffside Junction that same year.

In 1984, the railroad acquired the Seaboard System Railroad branch line between Ellenboro, North Carolina and Cliffside Junction, increasing the railroad's total mileage to 8.14.

By the 1980s, the railroad's traffic mix included textile products, waste, and scrap, and the railroad was owned by the Cone Mills Corporation and others.

Late in 1987, the railroad's service was suspended. The line was formally abandoned in January 1992.

== Preserved Equipment ==
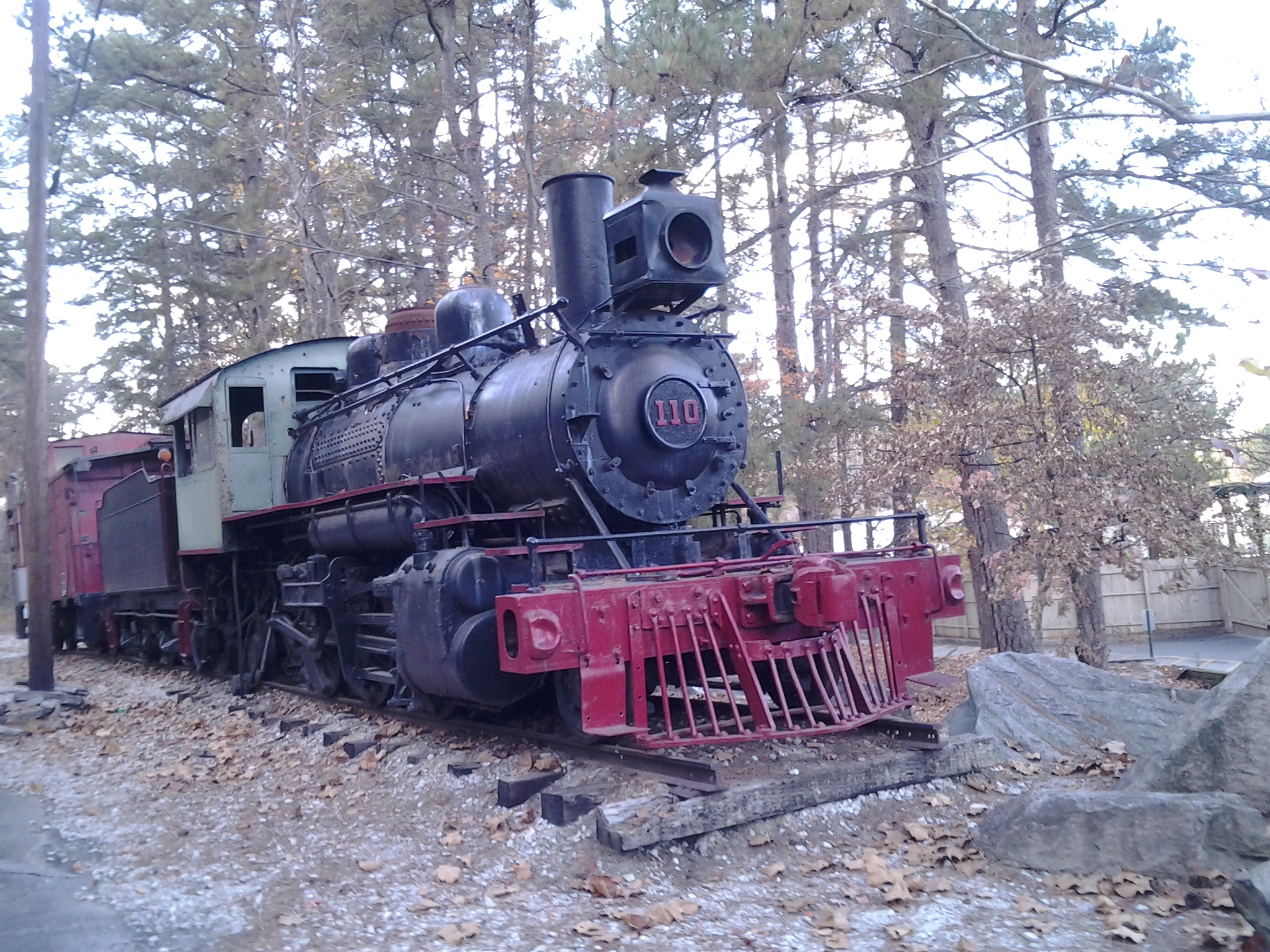
Former Cliffside Railroad #110, on display at Stone Mountain Railroad's Memorial Depot.

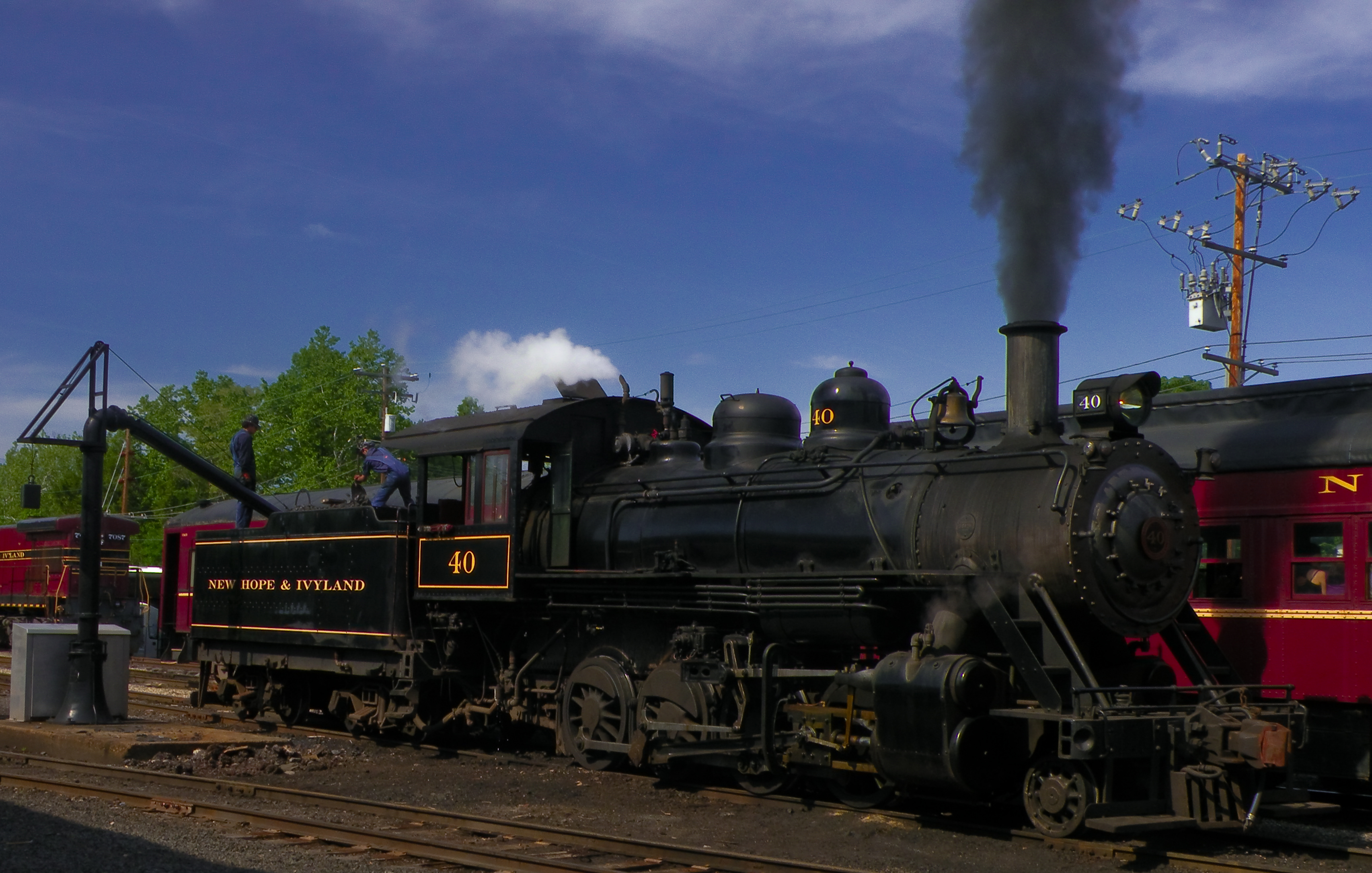
Former Cliffside Railroad #40, currently operating on the New Hope Railroad.

Two of the railroad's steam locomotives, both of which representing the last steam engines to operate on the railroad before it dieselized in 1962, have been preserved:

- Number 110, 2-6-2, built by the Vulcan Iron Works in 1927 as McRae Lumber & Manufacturing Gulf number 1. Later went to the Beechwood Band Mill in Cordele, Georgia, and was acquired by the Cliffside in 1933. The engine made its final run and was retired from revenue service on July 20, 1962, after which the railroad switched entirely to diesel powered operations and the 110 was placed in reserve until it was sold to the Swamp Rabbit Railroad in Cleveland, South Carolina, a year later. Swamp Rabbit eventually sold the engine to the Stone Mountain Scenic Railroad, where it was given the name "Yonah II" and operated around Stone Mountain Park until it encountered running gear issues and was withdrawn in 1982. In 1984, the No. 110 was placed on display outside the Stone Mountain's Memorial Depot. In late 2012, Stone Mountain sold the No. 110 to the New Hope Valley Railway in Bonsal, NC where it is now undergoing restoration to operation on their 4.5 mile tourist railroad.
- Number 40, 2-8-0, built by the Baldwin Locomotive Works in 1925 for the Lancaster and Chester Railway. The Cliffside Railroad bought the engine in 1947, and despite having been refurbished for continued use, No. 40 was retired from revenue service on July 20, 1962 along with No. 110 and sold to the New Hope Railroad, where it continues to operate.

== See also ==
- New Hope Railroad 40
- New Hope Railroad
