= Baldwin Class 10-32-D =

Class of Baldwin-built 4-6-0 "Ten-Wheeler" steam locomotives

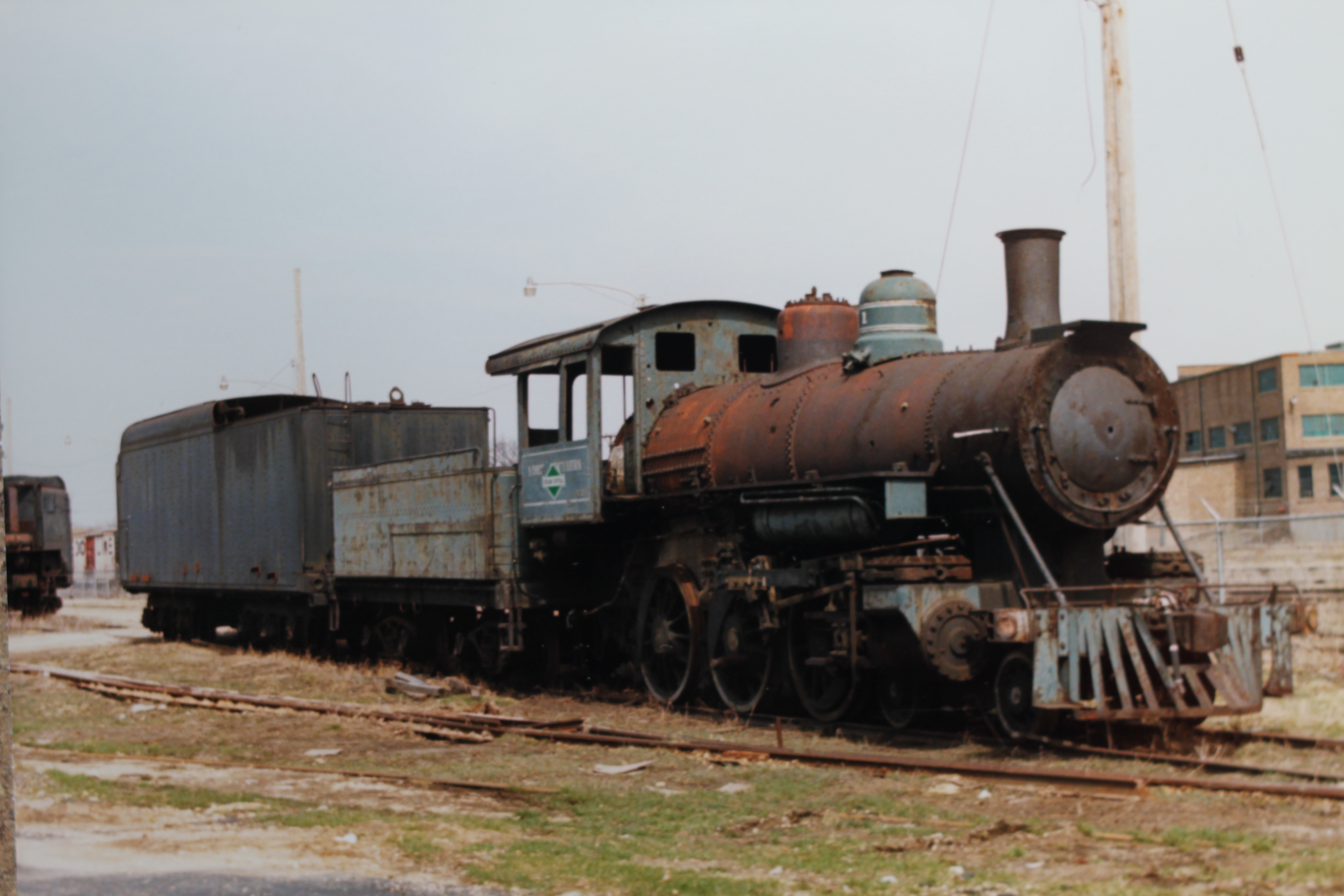
- Mississippi Eastern No. 303 (York Southern Railroad No. 1) along with the tenders from Illinois Central Nos. 2612 and 2614 in storage at Rockford, Illinois in 1988.
Type and origin
- Power type: Steam
- Builder: Baldwin Locomotive Works
- Model: 10-32-D
- Build date: 1915–1927
Specifications
- Configuration
  - Whyte: 4-6-0
- Gauge: 4 ft 8 1/2 in (1,435 mm) standard gauge
- Driver dia.: 62 in (1.575 m)
- Fuel type: Coal
- Fuel capacity: 8–11 t (8,000.000–11,000.000 kg)
- Water cap.: 4,500–5,000 US gal (17,034.353–18,927.059 L)
- Boiler pressure: 180 psi (1.2 MPa; 1,200 kPa)
- Cylinders: Two, outside
- Cylinder size: 18 in × 26 in (460 mm × 660 mm); 19 in × 26 in (480 mm × 660 mm)
Performance figures
- Tractive effort: 24,786–28,158 lbf (110.25–125.25 kN)
Career
- Operators: Crowell and Spencer Lumber Company, Mississippi Eastern Railway, Texas South-Eastern Railroad
- Class: 10-32-D
- Numbers: 400, 300, 303, 13, 106, 400, 44, 1591, 1671
- Disposition: Six preserved, remainder scrapped

The Baldwin Class 10-32-D was a class of 4-6-0 "Ten-Wheeler" type steam locomotives that were built by the Baldwin Locomotive Works for several railroads all across the United States of America between 1915 and 1927.

== History ==
=== Construction and delivery ===
In all, many Baldwin Class 10-32-D were constructed by the Baldwin Locomotive Works between 1915 and 1927 and they were all delivered to their respective railroads all across the United States of America after their day of construction.

=== Design ===
These locomotives had 62-inch diameter driving wheels, a boiler pressure of 180 psi (1.2 MPa), Walschaerts valve gear, 18 in × 26 in (460 mm × 660 mm) to 19 in × 26 in (480 mm × 660 mm), and tractive effort ranging from 24,786–28,158 lbf (110.25–125.25 kN).

Their tenders could hold from 8 to 11 tons of coal and 4,500 to 5,000 gallons of water. These locomotives weighed in from 63.5 to 71 tons (108.5 to 141 tons with tenders).

== Original buyers ==
Railroad	Quantity	Build date	Fleet nos.	Refs
Crowell and Spencer Lumber Company	2	1919	400, 300	
Mississippi Eastern Railway	1	April 1916	303	
Texas South-Eastern Railroad	1	August 1920	13	

== Preservation ==
As of today, a total of six examples of this class of locomotive are still left in preservation.

Photograph	Locomotive	Works No.	Build date	Operator	Status	Refs
	Red River and Gulf 106	57203	1923	Red River and Gulf Railroad	Undergoing cosmetic restoration	
	Crowell and Spencer Lumber Company 400	51175	January 1919	Crowell Long Leaf Lumber Company	On static display	
	Mississippi Eastern 303	43334	April 1916	Mississippi Eastern Railway	Awaiting cosmetic restoration	
	Hampton and Branchville 44	59751	1927	Hampton and Branchville Railroad	On static display	
	MINAZ 1591	44799	1917	MINAZ	On static display	
	MINAZ 1671	52376	1919	MINAZ	Operational	

== See also ==
- Baldwin Class 10-12-D
- Baldwin Class 10-34-E
- Baldwin Class 12-42-F
