= Woodstown Central 9 =

Preserved American 0-6-0 locomotive

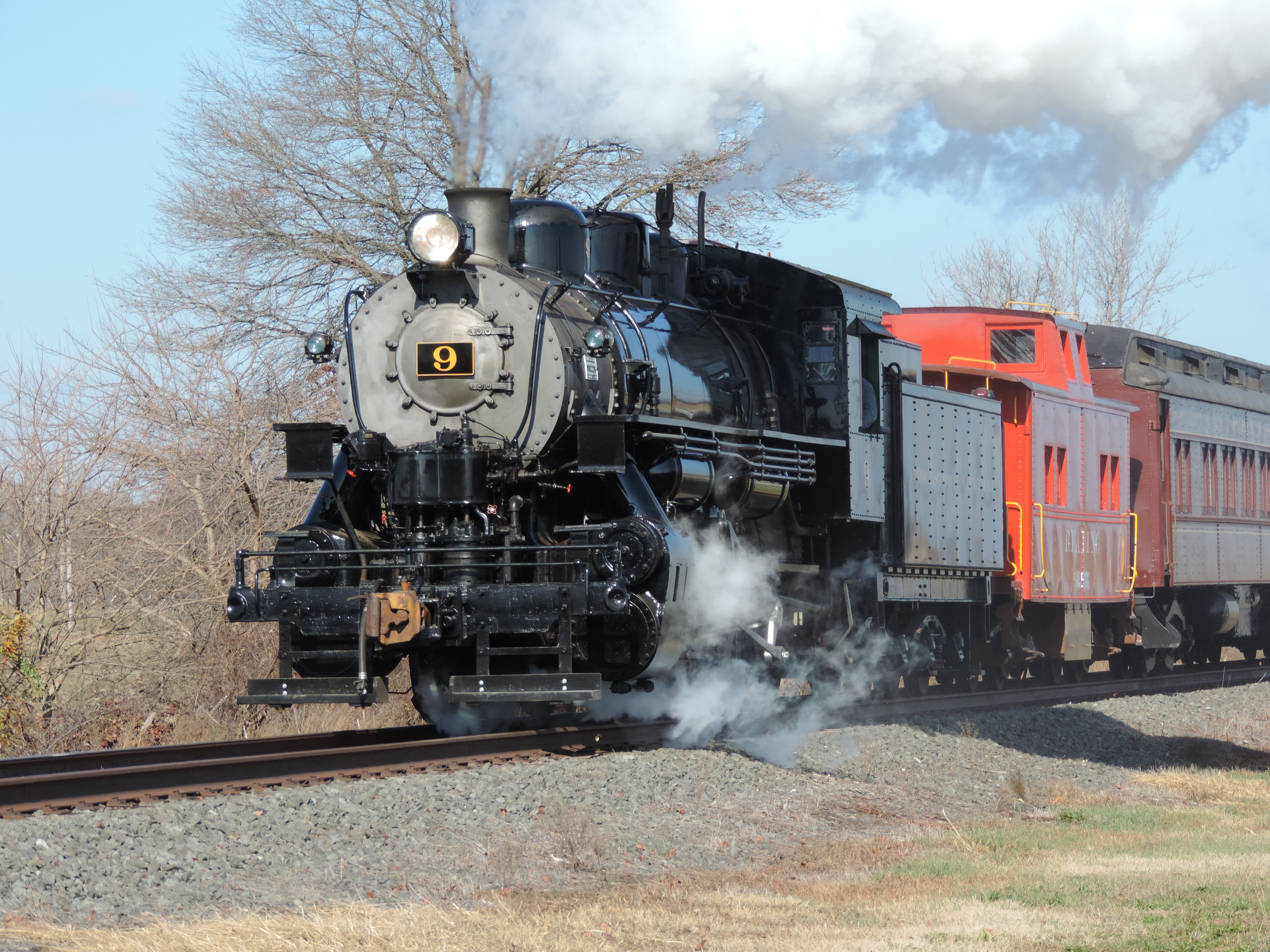
- No. 9 hauling an excursion through Woodstown, New Jersey on November 30, 2024
Type and origin
- Power type: Steam
- Builder: American Locomotive Company (Schenectady Works)
- Serial number: 70402
- Build date: October 1942
Specifications
- Configuration
  - Whyte: 0-6-0
- Gauge: 4 ft 8 1/2 in (1,435 mm) standard gauge
- Driver dia.: 50 in (1,270 mm)
- Width: 10 ft (3 m)
- Height: 16 ft 4 in (4.98 m)
- Total weight: 100,650 lb (45,650 kg)
- Fuel type: Coal
- Fuel capacity: 2,500 lbs
- Water cap.: 1,200 gal
- Boiler pressure: 190 psi (1.31 MPa)
- Cylinders: Two, outside
- Valve gear: Walschaerts
- Valve type: Piston valves
- Loco brake: Air
- Train brakes: Air
- Couplers: Knuckle
Performance figures
- Maximum speed: 45 mph (72 km/h)
Career
- Operators: United States Army; Virginia Blue Ridge Railway; New Hope Railroad; Woodstown Central Railroad
- Class: S155
- Numbers: USATC 4023; USATC 616; VBR 9; NHRR 9; WCR 9
- Retired: 1958 (1st revenue service); August 1, 1963 (2nd revenue service); 1970 (1st excursion service); 1981 (2nd excursion service)
- Restored: March 23, 1961 (1st revenue service); 1966 (1st excursion service); August 1976 (2nd excursion service); November 16, 2023 (3rd excursion service)
- Current owner: SMS Lines
- Disposition: Operational

Woodstown Central 9 is a S155 class 0-6-0 "Switcher" type steam locomotive, built in August 1942 by the American Locomotive Company's (ALCO) Schenectady Works. It is currently operated by the Woodstown Central Railroad (WCR) in New Jersey. The engine has had a historic career spanning military service, freight hauling, and passenger excursions.

== History ==
=== Revenue service ===
No. 9 was built in October 1942 at the American Locomotive Company's (ALCO) Schenectady Works in Schenectady, New York as U.S. Army No. 4023. It is classified as an S155 class and was part of a wartime order of standardized steam locomotives designed to provide reliable service for domestic military bases and for training soldiers in railway operations. No. 4023 was first assigned to Fort Dix, New Jersey, where it handled freight and training duties. It was later transferred to Fort Eustis, Virginia, the Army's principal railway training facility, and was renumbered to No. 616. At Fort Eustis, the locomotive was used extensively for instructional purposes, preparing U.S. Army railway units for service overseas during and after World War II until 1958, when it was retired from revenue service.

That same year, the locomotive was sold to the Virginia Blue Ridge Railway (VBR), it arrived on property on August 15, 1958 and was renumbered to No. 9. It was placed into service on March 23, 1961 and operated in freight service alongside three sister engines until August 1, 1963, when it hauled the last scheduled steam-powered train on the railroad prior to its complete dieselization. Following this trip, the engine was stored in serviceable condition until it was sold in 1966.

=== New Hope Railroad ===
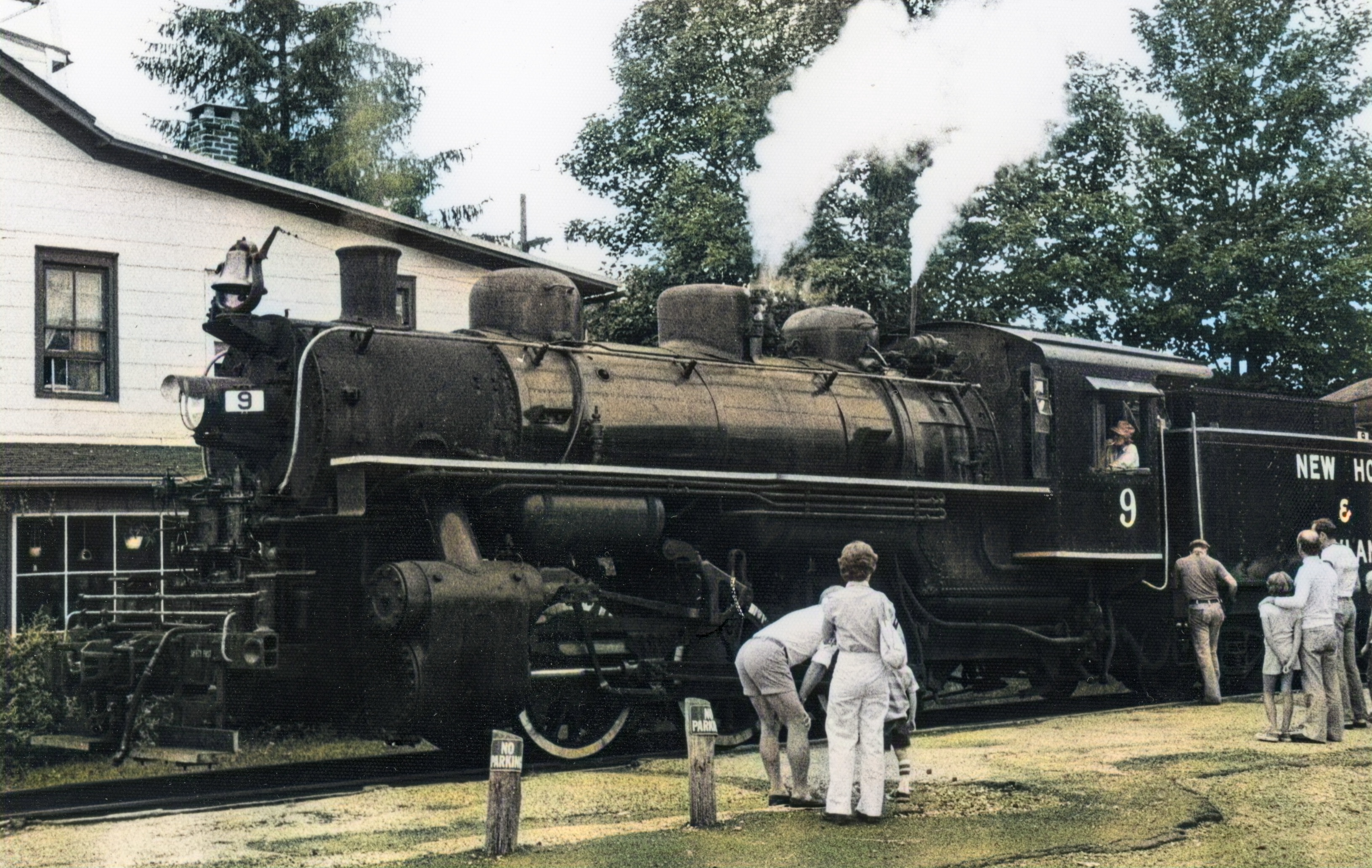
No. 9 on the New Hope and Ivyland Railroad in 1978

The New Hope & Ivyland Railroad (NHRR) in Pennsylvania acquired the locomotive in 1966 for excursion use No. 9 operated sporadically between the late 1960s until 1970 when it was put into storage, it was restored and returned to service in August 1976 and continued in excursion service until being retired again in 1981. After its retirement from excursions, the locomotive was stored and later disassembled during an incomplete restoration attempt in 1992. The engine was later replaced by New Hope Railroad 40.

=== SMS Rail Lines restoration ===
In 2009, the disassembled locomotive was acquired by SMS Rail Lines (SLRS), a short-line railroad based in New Jersey known for its historic fleet of Baldwin diesel locomotives. Restoration work was carried out at the company's Bridgeport, New Jersey shops. The project lasted 14 years and included the fabrication of replacement parts and upgrades to meet Federal Railroad Administration standards.

The locomotive was first test-fired in 2021 and officially certified for operation by the FRA on November 16, 2023, marking its return to active service after four decades.

=== Woodstown Central Railroad ===
The locomotive is currently used by the Woodstown Central Railroad (WCR), the passenger excursion division of SMS Rail Lines. The engine made its debut on November 30, 2024 and now pulls passenger trains on the historic Salem Branch Line in southern New Jersey, operating between South Woodstown and Salem. On April 18, 2025, No. 9 suffered an overheated bearing while on an excursion run, resulting it to be taken out of service to undergo repairs. It returned to service on September 20.

== See also ==
- New Hope Railroad 40
- SMS Rail Lines
- Canadian National 1392
