= Traymore station (PAAC) =

Traymore
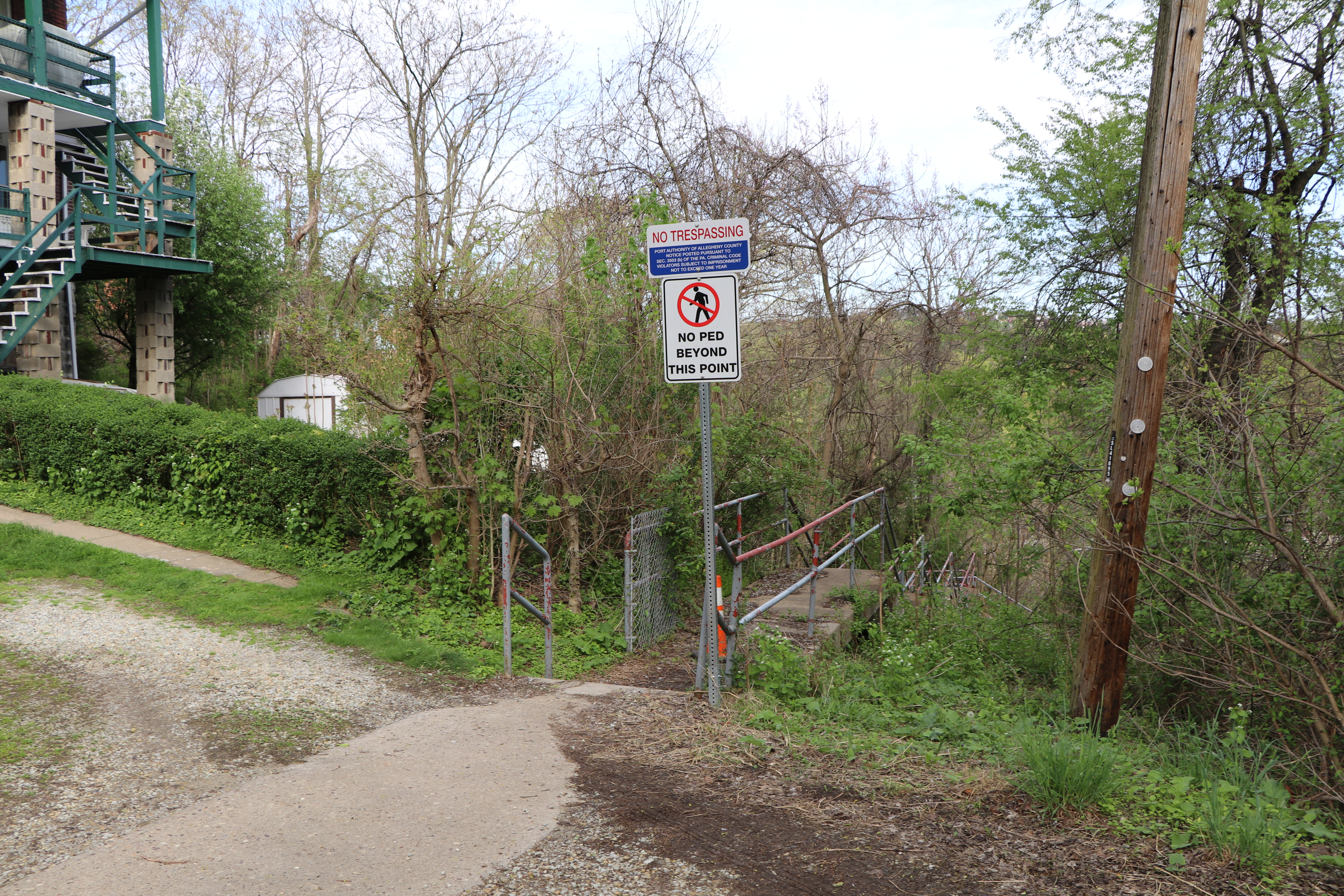
- The top of the closed stairs to Traymore in 2017

General information
- Location: off of Traymore Avenue; Pittsburgh, Pennsylvania
- Coordinates: 40.4116°N 80.0124°W
- Owner: Port Authority
- Tracks: 2

History
- Opened: May 22, 1987
- Closed: June 25, 2012

Services
Preceding station	Port Authority of Allegheny County	Following station
Dawn toward Allegheny	Red Line Overbrook Junction via Beechview	Pennant toward Overbrook Junction or South Hills Village
Location

Traymore was a station on the Port Authority of Allegheny County's light rail network, located in the Beechview neighborhood of Pittsburgh, Pennsylvania. The street level stop was located in an especially hilly portion of the area known for its rolling terrain, providing access to commuters within walking distance via concrete stairs at the dead end of Traymore Avenue.

Traymore was one of eleven stops closed on June 25, 2012 as part of a system-wide consolidation effort.
