= Lancaster and Chester Railroad =

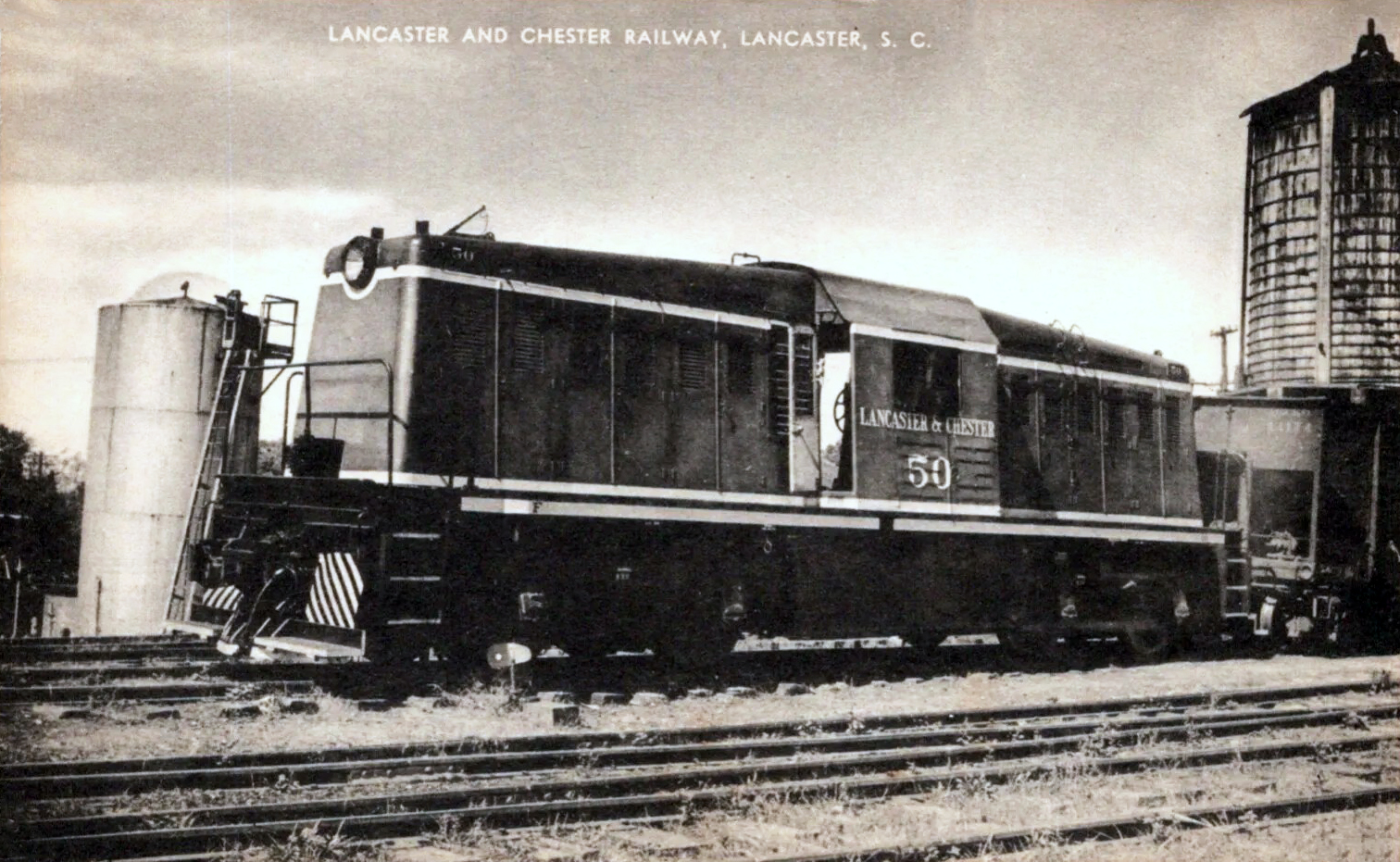
- Lancaster and Chester Railway, Lancaster, South Carolina, after 1946

Overview
- Headquarters: Lancaster, South Carolina
- Reporting mark: LC
- Locale: Chester County and Lancaster County, South Carolina
- Dates of operation: 1896–present

Technical
- Track gauge: 4 ft 8 1/2 in (1,435 mm) standard gauge
- Previous gauge: originally 3 ft (914 mm)

Other
- Website: gulfandohio.com

The Lancaster and Chester Railroad or L&C (reporting mark LC) is a railway headquartered in Lancaster, South Carolina. The original 29-mile (47 km) route connects Lancaster in Lancaster County with Chester in Chester County. The line's nickname is The Springmaid Line, which refers to its original purpose of connecting the plants of the Springs Mills company. It is owned by Gulf and Ohio Railways.

== History ==
=== Formation ===
In 1873, the Cheraw and Chester Railroad Company was granted a charter by a Special Act of the South Carolina General Assembly "to construct a railroad from Cheraw, in Chesterfield County, to Chesterville, in Chester County, by such route as shall be found most suitable and advantageous".

In those days, railroads were often built in sections using different contractors and money sometimes ran out before the line was tied together. This happened to the 3 ft (914 mm) narrow gauge Cheraw and Chester. In 1879, it made it the 22 miles (35 km) from Chester County to the Catawba River but did not cross it. On the other end, rail was laid from Cheraw to Pageland before the capital was exhausted in that direction. It operated for three years in these sections before being split. The Chester section was leased to the Charlotte, Columbia and Augusta Railroad, which built a wooden bridge across the Catawba and extended the track one mile (1.6 km) beyond Lancaster in 1883. It was then leased to the Richmond and Danville Railroad, which in turn went into receivership. Meanwhile, the line from Cheraw to Pageland became the Chesterfield and Lancaster Railroad but never extended any further.

The receivers for the Richmond and Danville operated the line from Lancaster to Lenoir as one railroad but neglected to pay expenses. It soon returned the Cheraw and Chester to its stockholders.

=== Colonel Leroy Springs ===
Two years later, in 1896, the railroad was sold by court order at an advertised auction for $25,000 to satisfy its debts. Its buyer, Colonel Leroy Springs, renamed the line the Lancaster and Chester Railroad and organized a company to run it.

In addition to Leroy Springs, the incorporators of the new railroad were William Ganson, R. C. McManus, W. T. Gregory, L. C. Payseur, James M. Heath and W. H. Hardin. All of the men were from Lancaster save for Hardin, who was from Chester. The capital stock of the company was $50,000. On June 22, 1896, Hardin, also manager of the Chesterville and Lenoir, was elected manager and auditor of the line.

Springs did not have any personal experience in the railroad business. His interest in purchasing the line may have stemmed in part from the fact that his father, Andrew Baxter Springs, had been one of the contractors and directors for the Charlotte, Columbia and Augusta Railroad, which helped form the towns of Rock Hill and Fort Mill, South Carolina. His grandfather, John Springs III, had been an early investor of the South Carolina Canal and Railroad Company, the nation's first operating railroad, and had the privilege of having one of its early engines named after him in the days when engines were named instead of numbered. Springs' brother was president of the Atlantic, Tennessee and Ohio Railroad (AT&O) that proceeded from Charlotte to Taylorsville before it ran out of capital. When he would refer to the AT&O in front of fellow businessmen, Springs would claim to be president of the Lancaster, Klondike and Manila Western Railroad.

Although the railroad business as a whole was not prosperous, the newly created L&C did not have to look far for business. Springs had recently completed a textile mill in Lancaster to go with the mills he already owned in Chester, all of which supplied traffic to the railroad. Other businesses in both towns were also served by the L&C. The line connected with the Southern Railway at both ends; with Carolina and Northwestern Railway (itself later part of Southern) at Chester; and with Seaboard Air Line at Fort Lawn.

In 1899, both the Catawba River Trestle and Lancaster Depot burned a few months apart from one another. The cost to replace both structures nearly equaled what Springs and his associates paid for the railway three years earlier. However, this misfortune did allow the line an opportunity to upgrade by building a steel trestle to replace the original wooden one.

For the first six years of its existence, the Lancaster and Chester Railroad had the distinct disadvantage of being a 3 ft (914 mm) narrow gauge railroad. Thus, it was impossible to exchange cars with the main lines, which were 4 ft 8 1/2 in (1,435 mm) standard gauge. Freight had to be unloaded from the main line cars in Lancaster or Chester and reloaded onto the smaller L&C cars and vice versa. Also, the L&C engines had to burn wood because the coal mines were on standard gauge lines and it was not economical to reload the coal on to smaller cars.

In 1902, Springs borrowed $125,000 from the Southern Railway to convert the L&C rails to standard gauge. The railway also bought new coal burning locomotives as well as new rail cars. The East Tennessee and Western North Carolina Railroad purchased the old rolling stock from the L&C. By 1913, the L&C owned three steam locomotives, nineteen box cars, two coal cars, two passenger cars, and two combines. Capital stock had risen from $50,000 to $500,000.

Then as now, odd-numbered trains ran eastbound and even-numbered trains ran westbound, against traditional railroad operating procedure. This is because before Springs bought the railroad, trains ran through from points north of Chester. Thus, they started their runs as southbound trains which, like westbound trains, normally have odd-digit numbers. They kept their odd numbers all the way to Lancaster on the Chester and Cheraw, even after they turned east at Chester.

Later that year, the Lancaster and Chester was persuaded to run a special passenger train to carry fans to a baseball series in Chester County between Chester and Dillon. There were as many passengers on that one train as the L&C ordinarily carried in an entire year. To make the most of the trip, several empty coal cars were attached in front of the passenger cars. When the train reached the Hooper Creek Trestle, one of the hopper cars derailed, taking the three coaches into the creek forty feet (12 m) below. Every person aboard was badly shaken or injured, and five lives were lost.

The seventy-one personal injury claims totaled more than $130,000, nearly causing the L&C to go bankrupt. Two weeks after the Hooper Creek derailment, a fire destroyed the Lancaster Depot, which also served as a warehouse for the mill, costing the railway an additional $75,000. It took Springs two years to emerge from the courthouse with his railroad intact. He then was able to borrow enough money to get the line operating again.

In 1916, a hurricane-generated flood washed away the three-span Catawba River Trestle as well as the Cane Creek Trestle near the Lancaster Plant. For weeks, the L&C detoured over the Southern line to Catawba Junction and the Seaboard line to Fort Lawn to connect with its own line. A ferry was then built to take the place of the trestle, but this proved to be both slow and expensive.

A new trestle would have cost $90,000, more than the railroad was worth before the old trestle was lost. The Southern Railway was not interested in taking the railroad back and building a new trestle. For a year, the option of abandoning operations and taking up the rails to sell for scrap was considered.

Springs then heard of a main-line trestle that was about to be abandoned by the railroad that owned it so they could replace it with a trestle that had double tracks. The trestle also included a bridge for automobiles. Colonel Springs bought this trestle and then sold it to the county for what he had paid for it. He was left with only the expense of moving the trestle to the Catawba and attaching it to the stone piers of the old trestle that were spared by the flood. The new trestle fit the piers of the old one.

The Lancaster and Chester resumed operations just in time to be taken over by the government during World War I.

=== Elliott Springs ===
Springs died in April 1931 leaving his empire to his only child, Elliott White Springs. Elliott Springs was born just weeks after his father purchased the L&C and had a genuine love for the railway. Under his leadership, the L&C began to prosper in the latter part of that decade, on the eve of the Second World War. In 1939, he brought the L&C national attention when he purchased the Loretto, a rail car that had originally been built for the former president of U.S. Steel, Charles M. Schwab. Springs carefully preserved the splendor of the forty-year-old car's Victorian design—Cuban mahogany paneling, crystal chandelier, velvet draperies, marble bath, and gold-plated beds. He had the Loretto remodeled for office use, then parked it on a siding near the White homestead in Fort Mill.

As of 2001, the Loretto is on display at the North Carolina Transportation Museum in Spencer, North Carolina.

Springs had a flair for colorful advertising. One of the things he remains best remembered for is the menu he wrote and printed for the L&C dining car. This menu included: Long Island Ugly Duckling stuffed with Turnip Greens and Pearl Onions, Cannibal Sandwich with real collar buttons, Pork Barrel stuffed with Republican, Drawn and Quartered Democrat Roasted in Own Jacket, and Elliott Springs with Garlic and Chlorophyll. Also offered were an alligator pear for one dollar and a pair of alligators for two dollars. Dessert was watermelon Jane Russell, pitted grapes and potted dates. That the L&C did not actually own a dining car at the time did not matter.

Springs rarely did anything in a small way and usually had fun doing it. It was his idea to appoint 29 vice-presidents to the railway, one for each mile of track. They included playwright Charles MacArthur, golfer Bobby Jones, artist James Montgomery Flagg, writer Lucius Beebe, radio man Lowell Thomas and his wartime friends Billy Bishop and Clayton Knight. Another one of these fictional vice-presidents was Ham Fisher, who seldom drew a freight train in his Joe Palooka strip without labeling it Lancaster and Chester.

However, it was striptease artist Gypsy Rose Lee, named vice-president in charge of unveiling, who got the most attention. Lee was brought to the attention of Springs by his friend, Agnew Bahnson of Winston-Salem, North Carolina. She was a devoted fan of the rails and kept models of famous trains in her basement.

In addition to providing menus for dining cars that did not exist and the naming of the colorful vice-presidents, Springs listed a timetable for trains that likewise did not exist. They included The Shrinking Violet, The Black Label, The Purple Cow, The Red Rose, The White Horse and The Blue Blazes.

When the New York, New Haven and Hartford denied Springs his request for a pass by writing that they were granted only to those lines that generated traffic for its route, he wrote back, "I note that the New Haven does not consider the L&C Railway of sufficient importance to honor its officials with an annual pass. I have personally routed some two hundred carloads over the New Haven in the past three or four months but you may rest assured that I will do otherwise in the future."

When Springs moved into his office at the new company headquarters in Fort Mill, he found himself with a four-foot-high (1.2 m) and 120-foot-long (37 m) blank space on his walls. He proposed a mural of his railroad, the Lancaster and Chester, but several aerial photographers insisted this would be impossible. In spite of this, Springs sent well-known photographer Elliott Lyman Fisher up with company pilot Cecil Neal. They flew up and down the line until Fisher had photographed every foot of track—villages, mills, woodlands and fields. When several mountings of the prints failed to satisfy Springs, Fisher colored each slide by hand. One hundred and eighty lights illuminated the slides from the rear giving them a three-dimensional effect. The mounting of the mural allowed Springs to inspect his railroad any time he wished.

In 1946, the L&C upgraded its fleet by buying six diesel locomotives from the U.S. Army. These 65-ton Whitcomb locomotives had seen service in Italy during the war and burned about the same amount of oil to run that the old steam engines used for lubrication. The purchase of these engines made the L&C the first fully diesel-operated railroad in the state, something that Springs liked to boast of. The steam engines formerly used by the railroad were either sold or put out to pasture. However, these diesels did not spend long on the line as they were replaced by three 70-ton 600 horsepower (450 kW) GEs in late 1950. Among the Whitcombs, number 51 passed to the Allegheny and South Side Railway where it would stay until the end of that property.

In 1951, Gypsy Rose Lee was on hand in Lancaster to 'unveil' the new Williamsburg-style depot. Her six-year-old son, Erik, was also present and was photographed with his mother in the cab of one of the L&C's locomotives. In addition, Springs gave the L&C its slogan, "The Springmaid Line". He also outfitted a Rolls-Royce as a high rail inspection vehicle. In the late 1950s, the Railway adopted a light blue, gray and white paint scheme to replace the dark blue and white scheme of earlier diesels.

=== H.W. Close ===
Elliott Springs died in 1959 and his son in-law, H.W. Close, became president of Springs and the L&C. In 1961, a steel shop and engine house was built in Lancaster to replace the wood structure that was currently in use. In late 1965, the GE diesels were replaced by two new EMD SW900s. They were given the numbers 90 and 91 and are still in use by the Railway on a regular basis in late 2001. These locomotives handled the traffic on the line—much of the time making two freight runs a day—until December, 1984, when an additional EMD SW900 was added to the fleet and given the number 92. In 1996, two EMD SW1500's, numbered 95 and 96, were added, followed by four EMD SW1200s in 1998, which were numbered 93, 94, 97 and 98. In 2001, the line leased two more ex-Conrails units from Locomotive Leasing Partners, or LLPX, SW1500 #215 and SW1001 #91.

== Recent events ==
The L&C added another aspect to its operation in 1996 when Bob Willetts began a passenger car restoration program in Lancaster. The J.P. Henderson car was the first to come out of Lancaster. It is currently in charter service on Amtrak. In the late 1970s, this car had been in storage in New York and a state of disrepair. It was bought, then moved to Hartsville, South Carolina where a total renovation began. It went back into service in 1989 and was later bought by the Lancaster and Chester.

In 2006, the South Carolina shortline got some national railroad attention again in Pennsylvania. The New Hope and Ivyland Railroad restored their Baldwin steam engine 2-8-0 #40 to her original appearance as a 1920s-era freight locomotive when she worked for the Lancaster and Chester. When the L&C went diesel in 1947, the steamer went to the Cliffside Railroad in North Carolina. Due to the conversion from steam to diesel motive power on the Cliffside, the #40 was sold in 1962. Steam Trains Inc., a Pennsylvanian group of investors, bought the 2-8-0 and had it shipped to the Reading roundhouse in Wilmington, Delaware. By 1966, the equipment was again transferred to New Hope, Pennsylvania where the locomotive operates to this day. However, it is now again lettered for the NH&I.

On March 25, 2001, the L&C entered into a lease-purchase agreement with Norfolk Southern to operate the SB trackage in Lancaster County. It is the first expansion in route mileage since the inception of the L&C more than one hundred years ago.

On September 2, 2010, Gulf and Ohio Railways announced it was purchasing the Lancaster and Chester; the deal was planned to be completed by November 2010.

== A look ahead for the L&C ==
In 2001, the Lancaster and Chester entered into a lease-purchase agreement with Norfolk Southern to operate the former SB line in Lancaster County. This extends from MP 89.5 near the Catawba River to MP 58.7 in Kershaw, a total of 30.8 miles (49.6 km). This ended years of negotiation between the two lines. Until then the Lancaster and Chester Railroad had virtually the same route-mileage since its inception in 1896. It passes over nine wooden trestles ranging in length from 74-to-321-foot (23 to 98 m) long Catawba River Trestle is a combination structure made of wooden trestle segments and four steel though trusses. Along the line lies 66 curves, the sharpest of which is 5 degrees 30 minutes. The steepest grade is a mile and half stretch west of Richburg called, appropriately enough, Richburg Hill. At 4.7%, it is said to be among the steepest in the Southeast. (This might even be more true now that NS stopped rolling trains over Saluda.)

The Railway invested heavily in its own line in the late 1990s, spending close to nine million dollars over a three- to five-year period. New rail was laid replacing 85 to 95 pound per yard (42–47 kg/m) rail with 127-132 lb/yd (63–66 kg/m) rail. Most of it is stick rail, through some welded sections were added on crossings and curves to simplify maintenance. In addition, the railroad tripled their locomotive fleet in that time period going from three units in 1996 to a total of nine by the end of the decade. Bridges were also strengthened. This allowed the Railway to begin using 286,000 pounds (130,000 kg) cars instead of the 200,000 pounds (91,000 kg) cars previously used. In time, the L&C plans to use 315,000 pounds (143,000 kg) cars.

There are now two interchanges on the line. One is with Norfolk Southern in Chester on their Charlotte to Columbia main. Traffic to and from the interchange on the NS end is handled daily with their local out of Rock Hill. The power on these locals are generally GP59s or high hood GP38-2s. NS Transcaer GP59 #4611 and Operation Lifesaver #4640 was power for most of October, 2001. An interchange with CSX-predecessor Seaboard Coast Line (and before that Seaboard Air Line) was built in 1981 in East Chester to replace the SCL interchange in Fort Lawn that was abandoned at the same time. Power on these trains can be anything from GP40s to wide noses—even LMSX #710 once or twice—to ex-Con B36-7s.

The lease agreement with Norfolk Southern effectively takes away the Lancaster interchange which had not been used in many years. Most of the L&C's traffic on the Original 29 is on the Chester end of the line and the car-hire charge was reduced if all interchange was handled there.

There was a time when the L&C's parent company was responsible for up to 90% of the traffic on the line, up to 13,000 cars annually at the six plants on the line. (The L&C also switched out the Eureka Plant in Chester. To get there, they had to cross Seaboard at grade while using the Southern Columbia to Charlotte main. The last time I saw this happen was in 1989.)

However, when Springs bought another company, a truck fleet came with it. The trucking side soon became more dominant and Springs-generated rail traffic dwindled from a couple of thousand cars of textile-related material annually to roughly one hundred cars a year at the Lancaster Complex in the early 2000s. That plant was closed in 2003 and soon torn down to make way for a park. The hundred cars that came out of that plant in later years was bales of corrugated cardboard which was taken a few miles up track to Bowers Fibers. When Springs stopped shipping there by rail, Bowers Fibers stopped receiving by rail. Springs-owned Grace Water Treatment Plant uses about 1,400 cars of coal a year. In terms of revenue, this was for many years the largest business served by the L&C.

In the late 1970s, the railroad, sensing that Springs-generated traffic would soon dwindle, created a 470-acre (190 ha) industrial park In Richburg near I-77. Formerly known as Carolina's Distribution Park, since renamed The L&C Railway Distribution Park, this area includes Guardian Industries, Porter-Warner and Thyssen Steel, which was the first industry to move there. Thyssen, which recently opened a second plant on the line, takes inbound coils of sheet steel and slits them for various industries, such as stampings for automobiles, lawn mowers and refrigerators. The Lancaster and Chester handles up to 2,400 carloads of sand and chemicals to park tenant Guardian Glass a year. Also, the Railway bought four gondolas for Guardian to ship cullet to the Richburg plant from Florida. (However, these gondolas, numbered 300 to 303, are in storage on line. Two of them are in Fort Lawn on the spur that once led to the cotton warehouses.)

The Railway owns more than 1,000 acres (400 ha) of land near I-77 in Richburg and hopes to attract other businesses to the area. But not at any cost. A Charlotte, North Carolina company was recently looking to build along the line. However, research into the company's past revealed a number of environmental citations. As a result of this finding, the Lancaster and Chester decided not to sell to this company.

For volume of cars, the largest customer on the line was at one time GAF at a section of track in East Chester near the CSX interchange. GAF has stopped shipping as much by rail. Archer-Daniels-Midland in Kershaw is currently the biggest customer on the line with estimates ranging up to 4,000 cars a year. Circle S at MM17 on the Original 29 handles some 3,500 cars a year. Furthermore, there is a shuffle train between the two feed mills. This was billed as an added bonus to L&C operation of the SB. Formerly, 18-wheelers, up to 60 a week, handled this traffic.

The L&C owns a fleet of boxcars—50-foot (15 m) cars built in 1979, 60-foot (18 m) cars built in 1996—that were used primarily by GAF, which manufactures rolled roofing-mat material. The 50 footers once numbered forty in total and were in the 200 to 239 block. Five were lost in a derailment in Arkansas while ten were sold to Lexington & Ohio Railroad in 2000. The 60 footers are numbered 600 to 619. For a time, fifteen of these had been leased by CSX. I believe those have since been returned to service by L&C.

PPG Industries is also in East Chester. PPG manufactures 70 million pounds (32,000 metric tons) of fiber material annually that is used in such diverse products as computers and surfboards. Speciality Polymers, Union Carbide and Owens-Corning are also near the wye at East Chester.

Once every week to ten days, the L&C gets unit trains from Ohio for the Circle S Feed Mill now at Milepost 17 between Fort Lawn and Richburg. Both Norfolk Southern and CSX were vying for Circle S. But the L&C convinced the owner of the plant to locate on the L&C by making him see that, according to Steve Gedney, president of the L&C, 'he could have the best of both worlds here,' a reference to being able to choose the best rate between both Class 1 carriers that the L&C connects with. It was this business, along with the 4.7 percent grade at Richburg Hill, that prompted the Railway to purchase four ex-Conrail EMD SW1200s which arrived in 1998. One of these 1200s, 97, spent most of the first three years it was on the line at Circle S unloading the grain cars. As of early November, 2001, it had been replaced by LLPX SW1001 #91. When the SW1001 was returned to LLPX, the railroad put their SW900 #91 at the grain mill.

In all, the Railway handles about 14,000 cars a year in steel, coal, chemicals, glass, fiberglass, sand, corn, barley, soybeans and lumber. Steve Gedney, however, said that it is hard to project actual car loadings. However, this number is certainly an improvement from the 5,800 cars it averaged yearly during the 1980s. An additional 4,000 cars could be added if Circle S undergoes a planned expansion. L&C officials foresee moving between 18,000 and 20,000 cars a year in the future, but add that the line could handle upwards of 30,000 a year (on the original route) "without bumping into each other."

But it is the recent lease-purchase deal with Norfolk Southern that offers the most hope from growth on the Lancaster and Chester. "I think the main thing is our presence and having our operating headquarters in this area", Steve Gedney, the president of the railroad told this reporter.

"If we want to grow our business, which by doing that helps and assists the local economy whether it be in Lancaster County, Chester County or even York County, we do our own marketing in conjunction with the county economic developers for both counties to try to locate companies and factories that will use rail."

The primary customers on the new line are the Archers-Daniels-Midland plant in Kershaw and AmeriSteel on Riverside Road in Lancaster. Gedney envisions service to existing companies on the line that presently do not use rail.

"We are going to see what we can do initially with shippers that have been on the line that have stopped shipping like Thomas and Betts. They’ve got a rail siding going in there. We’re going to talk to them and see if there's anything we can do to help their business which would put rail cars on the line."

Additionally, a spur was put in at Southern Gas north of the interchange in Lancaster. Southern Railway once served this business, but that spur had been taken up years ago.

The line has reshuffled the way they move the trains. In addition, they have put in 100 pound-per-yard (50 kg/m) switches. Presently everything that is on the main line right now on the Kershaw District is 85 lb/yd (42 kg/m) rail. This compares with the 127 to 132 lb/yd (63–66 kg/m) rail on the L&C's original line. New ties have been placed as well on all the curves. Gedney adds, "We’ve also done some bridge work on the 521 bridge. That's not major work, mainly just heavy maintenance."

Meanwhile, the L&C and Lancaster County Economic Development Corporation President Ray Gardner are seeking new business to the line. "We’ve already identified some land around Heath Springs and Kershaw," Gardner said and he suggested that it would be used to make a 200-acre (0.81 km^{2}) park.

There are also two parcels of land in the northern part of the county. One is nearly 1,200 acres (4.9 km^{2}) of land at Foster Park. This area is on Riverside Road. "It's zoned I-2," said Gardner, "heavy industrial. We hope to take advantage of that. On down Riverside Road near the airport, we hope the county is going to get us some land there."

"They didn’t go out of their way marketing," Gardner said of how Norfolk Southern handled the line in Lancaster. "I’m not critical of them. But the L&C has got better service. They’re more dependable. They’re local. If you need something, you can drive down there to see them. They’re eager just like we are."

The purchase of the former SB line in Lancaster has fueled speculation on whether the L&C will ever make it into Catawba or Rock Hill where interchange with CSX could be easier for Kershaw. But more than six years after the L&C commenced operations on the SB line, this has not happened yet.

The L&C purchased their first non endcab units, two EMD GP38-2s that were originally leased from Helms Leasing after spending most of their career on Conrail and Norfolk Southern. The LC is also currently leasing four rebuilt GP38-2s from GMTX.
