= Great Western 90 =

Preserved American 2-10-0 locomotive

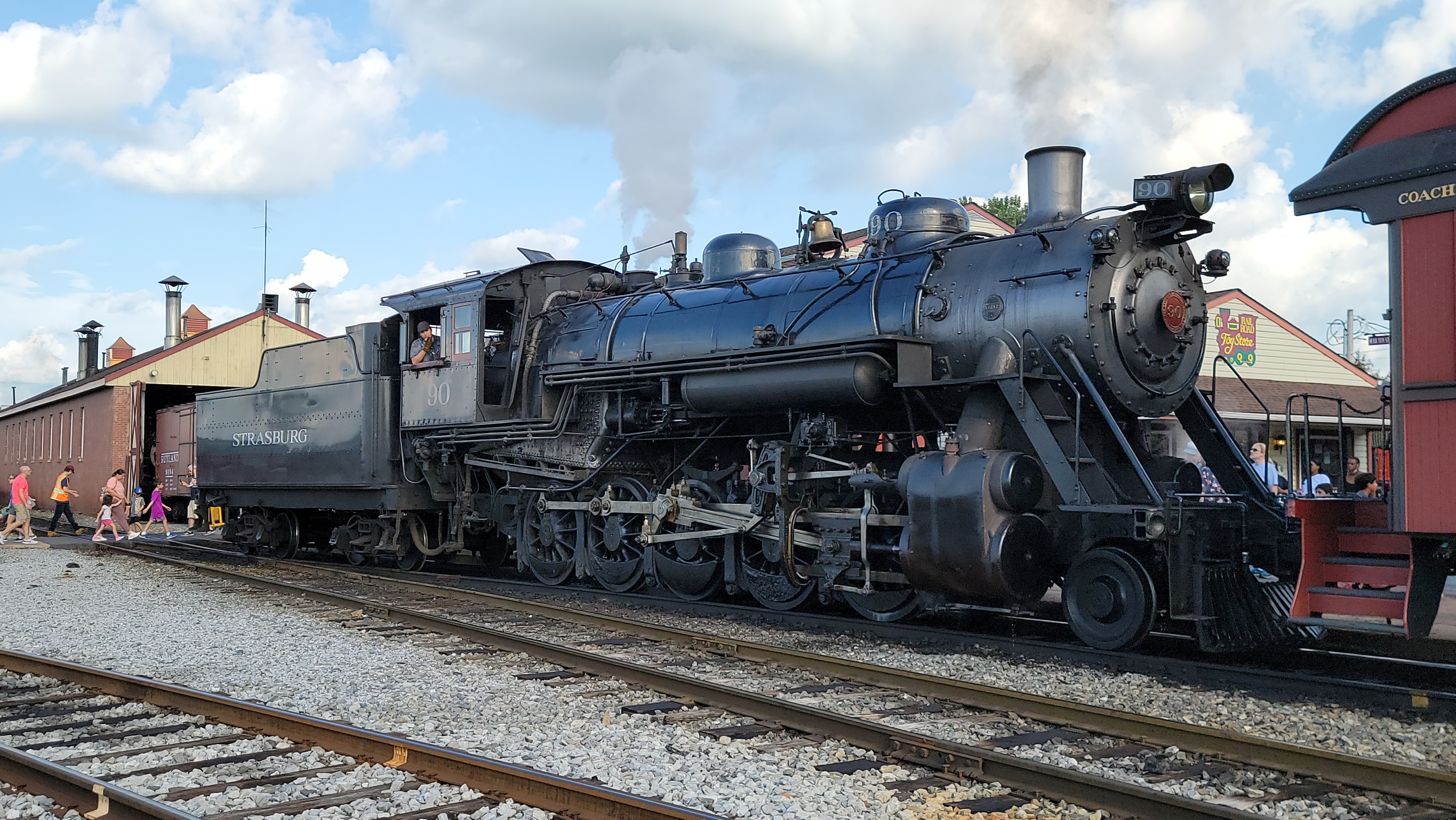
- Great Western 90, East Strasburg station, August 20, 2021
Type and origin
- Power type: Steam
- Builder: Baldwin Locomotive Works
- Serial number: 57812
- Model: 12-42-F
- Build date: June 1924
- Rebuild date: 1945
Specifications
- Configuration
  - Whyte: 2-10-0
  - UIC: 1′E h
- Gauge: 4 ft 8 1/2 in (1,435 mm) standard gauge
- Driver dia.: 56 in (1,422 mm)
- Axle load: 38,000 lb (17,000 kg)
- Adhesive weight: 190,000 lb (86,000 kg)
- Loco weight: 212,000 lb (96,000 kg)
- Fuel type: Coal
- Firebox
  - Grate area: 54.3 sq ft (5.04 m^{2})
- Boiler pressure: 200 psi (1,400 kPa)
- Cylinders: Two, outside
- Cylinder size: 24 in × 28 in (610 mm × 710 mm)
- Valve gear: Walschaerts
- Valve type: Piston valves
- Loco brake: Air
- Train brakes: Air
- Couplers: Knuckle
Performance figures
- Maximum speed: 50 mph (80 km/h)
- Tractive effort: 48,960 lbf (217.8 kN)
- Factor of adh.: 3.88
Career
- Operators: Great Western Railway; Strasburg Rail Road
- Class: 12-42-F
- Numbers: GW 90; SRC 90
- First run: June 1924 (GWR run); May 13, 1967 (SRC test run)
- Retired: April 1967
- Restored: February 1968
- Current owner: Strasburg Rail Road
- Disposition: Operational

Great Western 90 is a preserved 12-42-F class 2-10-0 "Decapod" type steam locomotive, built in June 1924 by the Baldwin Locomotive Works (BLW), No. 90 originally pulled sugar beet trains for the Great Western Railway of Colorado (GWR), and it was the largest of the company's roster. On April 5, 1967, No. 90 was purchased by the Strasburg Rail Road (SRC) east of Strasburg, Pennsylvania, who needed a more powerful steam engine to pull the ever-increasing tourist trains through the Lancaster County countryside.

== History ==
=== Design and revenue service ===
No. 90 was built in June 1924 by the Baldwin Locomotive Works (BLW) in Philadelphia, Pennsylvania, for the Great Western Railway of Colorado (GW) as part of Baldwin's 12-42-F class. Based on the Russian Decapod design, the locomotive was engineered to deliver high power on lightweight tracks with minimal axle loading. Key specifications included 24-by-28-inch (610 mm × 711 mm) cylinders, 56-inch (1,422 mm) driving wheels, and a superheated boiler operating at 200 psi (1,379 kPa), making it the first superheated locomotive in GW's roster.

No. 90 was the largest and most powerful road locomotive on GW, primarily used for hauling sugar beet trains of 40–50 cars to the Loveland, Colorado, mill. During World War II, it was modified with an extended smokebox to accommodate poor-quality lignite coal. This upgrade followed a rebuild after a 1944 collision with a truck. Post-war, No. 90 served mainly during the autumn harvest season and later operated occasional excursion and campaign trains.

On June 6, 1958, No. 90 hauled an excursion—sponsored by the Railway and Locomotive Society's Pacific Coast Chapter—from Longmont to Loveland, working alongside Colorado and Southern (C&S) 2-10-2 No. 902. On September 2, 1963, No. 90 hauled the Intermountain Limited excursion as part of the National Railway Historical Society (NRHS) Convention, working alongside Chicago, Burlington and Quincy 5632. During this event, Strasburg Rail Road (SRC) representatives Huber Leath and John Bowman met GW superintendent Baker, expressing interest in acquiring the locomotive for SRC should it become available.

By April 1967, No. 90 was the last active road locomotive on GW and was retired and listed for sale. SRC bid $23,000 in cash (approximately $210,168 in 2024) to acquire the locomotive for use in Pennsylvania. Competing bids aimed to keep it in Colorado for further excursion use, but GW opted for SRC's cash offer. The purchase was finalized on April 5, 1967, transferring No. 90 to SRC for preservation and operation.

=== Strasburg Rail Road ownership ===
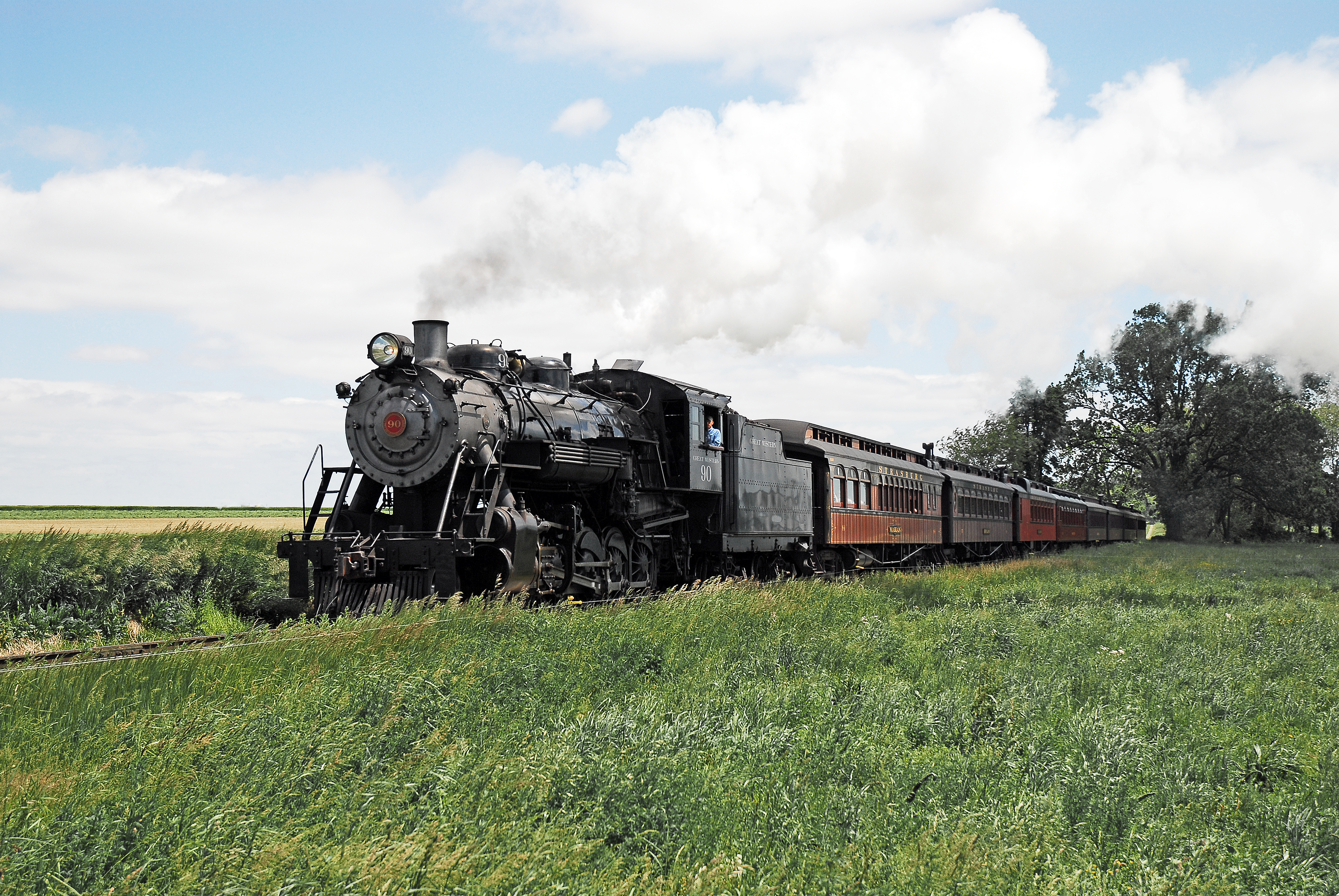
No. 90 pulling a tourist excursion, May 22, 2006

Following the purchase, the locomotive was shipped to SRC's property. No. 90 arrived on May 5, and then it performed its first test run for the railroad on May 13. While the locomotive was in good condition, SRC had to give No. 90 an overhaul for a mandated set of flues, and work was completed by February 1968. That same month, Ross Rowland's High Iron Company sponsored two mainline excursion trains, and Canadian Pacific (CPR) 4-6-2 locomotives Nos. 1238 and 1286 were originally planned to be leased to pull the train, but owner George M. Hart put them on an emergency lease to the city of Reading, Pennsylvania, to provide steam for a power plant. Unwilling to cancel the excursions, Rowland arranged to lease CPR 4-6-2 No. 127 from Steamtown, U.S.A. and No. 90 from SRC to power the trains.

On February 18, No. 127 hauled the first excursion on the Central Railroad of New Jersey (CNJ), Lehigh Valley (LV), and Penn Central (PC) mainlines between Newark, New Jersey and Jim Thorpe, Pennsylvania, and No. 90 doubleheaded with No. 127 for assistance over the CNJ's Penobscot Mountain grades from Jim Thorpe to Ashley. The first excursion was plagued with various problems; while traveling in New Jersey, No. 127 stalled from a poorly-burning fire; while traveling on the CNJ grades downhill, one of No. 90's tender trucks fell apart and derailed; and while in Ashley, No. 127 struggled to negotiate a wye and was blocked by a derailed diesel locomotive. The passengers were sent home in a swiftly-procured fleet of buses. The following weekend, the second doubleheader excursion occurred on the same route without incident.

No. 90 during the Celebrate America 250 event. July 3, 2026.

After the second excursion ended, No. 90 was returned to SRC to pull its first official tourist trains there, and it was celebrated as the railroad's main attraction. Sometime in 1993, Strasburg crews had 90's extended smokebox removed. In February 2006, No. 90 was repainted in its original GW livery and operated for a photo charter. In October 2020, No. 90 was temporarily backdated to its late 1960s appearance with the original SRC "egg" logo, whitewall wheels, and gold pinstripings for the Steam Strikes Back photo charter, commemorating SRC's 60th anniversary. By early 2024, No. 90 was removed from service to undergo its federally mandated 1,472-day inspection, SRC eventually returned No. 90 back to full service in April 2025, repainted back to its 1990s paint scheme. On June 8, 2025, No. 90 towed Chesapeake and Ohio 614 from Leaman Place to the SRC's workshop where No. 614's owner, RJD America, LLC, has contracted the SRC to restore the locomotive to operating condition.

== Accidents and incidents ==
- On May 6, 1940, a major fire broke out at the GW's roundhouse in Loveland, with three steam locomotives still inside. No. 90 happened to be under steam at the time, and quick-thinking crews used No. 90 to pull all the other locomotives out of the burning building. The roundhouse fire cost the GW nearly $200,000 in damage, and the locomotives, including No. 90, sustained damage, but they were subsequently repaired. When No. 90 was rebuilt, it had its pumps and running boards rearranged.
- On November 7, 1944, No. 90 was broadsided by a truck at a grade crossing east of Loveland and knocked onto its fireman's side, with the truck being damaged beyond repair. Both the fireman and the truck driver were killed in the accident, which was deemed the worst rail disaster in GW's history. The GW sent 90 to the Chicago, Burlington and Quincy Railroad's (CB&Q) shops in Denver, where repairs on the locomotive took several months to complete. In the process, the locomotive received its extended smokebox to accommodate the lignite coal it used, at the time.
- In 1956, No. 90 was hit by another truck, twisting and damaging the locomotive's side gear. The truck driver was killed, while No. 90's engineer and fireman were severely injured. The locomotive subsequently had to be repaired again.

== See also ==
- Canadian National 89 – Preserved CN class E-10-a locomotive
- Canadian National 7312 – Preserved CN O-9 class locomotive
- Great Western 60 – Preserved American 2-8-0 steam locomotive
- Norfolk and Western 475 – Preserved N&W class M 4-8-0 locomotive

== Bibliography ==
- Boyd, Jim (September 1978). "Dutchland Decapod". Railfan. Vol. 2, no. 6. Carstens Publications. pp. 24–25.
- Morgan, Gary (1975). Sugar Tramp: Colorado's Great Western Railway. Fort Collins, Colorado: Centennial Publications. LCCN 75-26118.
