= Great Western 60 =

Preserved American 2-8-0 steam locomotive

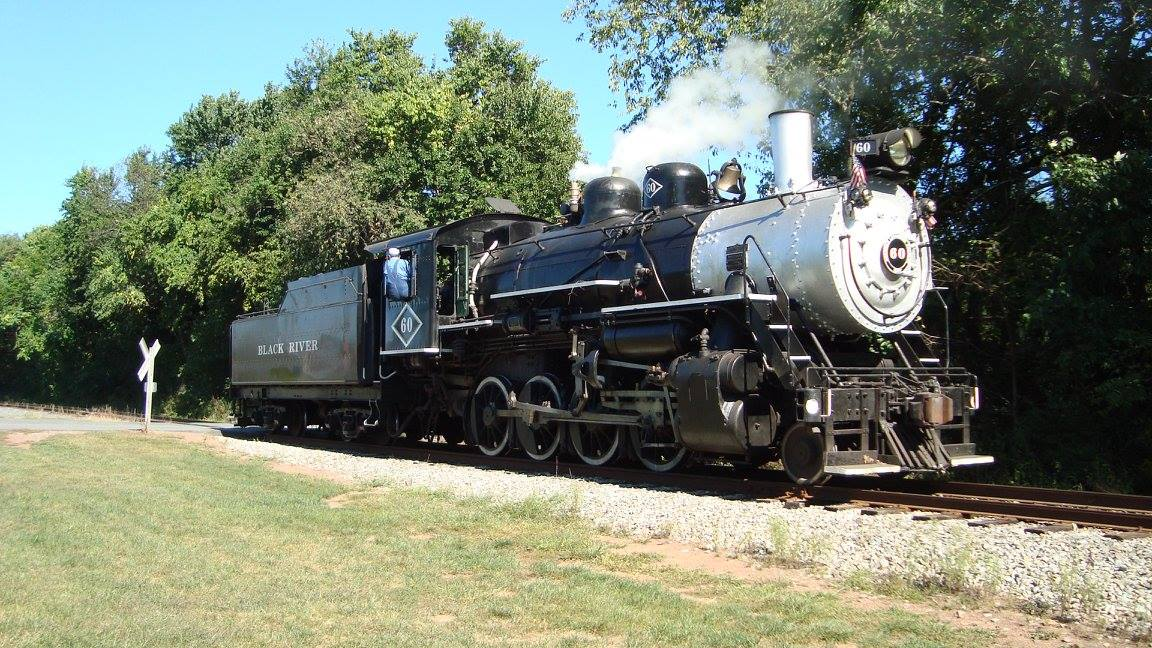
- No. 60 running light on September 18, 2016
Type and origin
- Power type: Steam
- Builder: American Locomotive Company (Schenectady Works)
- Serial number: 69021
- Build date: August 1937
- Rebuild date: 1945
Specifications
- Configuration
  - Whyte: 2-8-0
- Gauge: 4 ft 8 1/2 in (1,435 mm)
- Driver dia.: 51 in (1,295 mm)
- Wheelbase: 57.20 ft (engine and tender)
- Adhesive weight: 141,500 lb (64.2 tonnes)
- Loco weight: 161,000 lb (73.0 tonnes)
- Tender weight: 149,600 lb (67.9 tonnes)
- Fuel type: Coal
- Fuel capacity: 12 long tons (12 t)
- Water cap.: 8,000 imp gal (36,000 L; 9,600 US gal)
- Boiler pressure: 200 lbf/in^{2} (1.38 MPa)
- Cylinders: Two, outside
- Cylinder size: 19 in × 26 in (483 mm × 660 mm)
- Valve gear: Walschaerts
- Valve type: Piston valves
- Loco brake: SA6
- Train brakes: 6ET
- Couplers: Knuckle
Performance figures
- Tractive effort: 31,287 lbf (139.17 kN)
- Factor of adh.: 4.52
Career
- Operators: Great Western Railway; Black River and Western Railroad
- Class: 60
- Numbers: GW 60; BRW 60
- Delivered: September 1937
- Retired: 1958
- Restored: April 25, 1965
- Current owner: Black River and Western Railroad
- Disposition: Undergoing 1,472-day inspection and overhaul

Great Western 60 is a 60 class 2-8-0 "Consolidation" type steam locomotive built in August 1937 by the American Locomotive Company's (ALCO) Schenectady Works in Schenectady, New York. It currently operates on the Black River and Western Railroad (BRW) in Ringoes, New Jersey It was one of two operating Great Western steam locomotives with No. 90 being the other one.

== History ==
=== Revenue service ===
No. 60 was built in August 1937 by the American Locomotive Company's (ALCO) Schenectady Locomotive Works, it originally operated on the Great Western Railroad (GWR) in Colorado where it pulled sugar beet and molasses trains. During World War II, a smokebox extension was added to allow the use of poor quality coal because of war-time restrictions, No. 60 would continue to work in revenue service until being retired in the late 1950s.

=== Black River and Western Railroad ===
In 1963, No. 60 was purchased by the newly formed short line Black River and Western Railroad (BRW) for tourist excursion service. It made its first passenger test run on April 25, 1965 and pulled the first official excursion train out of Flemington on May 16, 1965. During its tenure running on the Black River & Western, 60 has undergone several cosmetic changes through the years. The current paint scheme resembles a mid-sized freight locomotive, with a graphite smokebox and black drivers.

In 1994, No. 60 visited the Whippany Railway Museum for the Whippany Railway Museum train festival alongside New York, Susquehanna and Western 142, hauling sixteen excursions over the Morristown and Erie Railway (ME) between Whippany and Morristown.

The locomotive was used as the primary motive power for the railroad when in service. The locomotive was taken out of service in November 2000 for a mandatory 1,472-inspection required by the Federal Railroad Administration (FRA) which took almost twelve years to complete. The locomotive returned to service in August 2012. In November 2023, No. 60 was removed from service to undergo another FRA 1,472-day inspection and overhaul.

== Bibliography ==
- Jagger, Jerry J. (2016). Black River & Western Railroad. Images of Rail (1st ed.). Arcadia Publishing. ISBN 978-1-4671-2412-6.
- National Railway Bulletin. Vol. 60–61. National Railway Historical Society. 1995. p. 142.
