= Fernwood Lumber Company =

American lumber company, 1870s to 1920s

Fernwood Lumber Company had its beginning in the 1870s when John Fletcher Enochs and his son, Isaac Columbus Enochs, started a lumber business near Crystal Springs in Copiah County, Mississippi. Between 1880 and 1920, Fernwood Lumber Company became one of the largest lumber operations in south Mississippi with investments in timberland, lumber mills, and railroads.

== History ==
By the mid-1880s, Isaac Enochs had brought two of his brothers, James Luther and Philip Henry, into the family lumber business and expanded their operations by purchasing timberland and constructing a sawmill between the towns of McComb and Magnolia in Pike County. The business was incorporated in 1884 as Fernwood Lumber Company, and the Enochs built the company town of Fernwood. That same year, Philip Henry Enochs became president of Fernwood Lumber Company, and built a home in Fernwood. The Philip Enochs home is on the National Register of Historic Places in Pike County, Mississippi.

The Fernwood Lumber Company continued to expand through the 1890s, adding planning mills, opening a retail lumber yard in Jackson, and acquiring timberland in Louisiana, Oklahoma, and Texas. By 1910, the company sawmill was processing 100,000 board feet of lumber daily.

Once the virgin pines nearest the mill had been cut, the Enochs company built railroad spurs into more distant forests for bringing logs to the mill. Fernwood Lumber Company organized its logging railroad into a common carrier, the Fernwood & Gulf Railroad, which was incorporated in 1906. In 1920, the Fernwood & Gulf Railroad became Fernwood, Columbia & Gulf Railroad with 44 miles (71 km) of track. The Fernwood railroad connected to the larger Illinois Central Railroad and the New Orleans Great Northern Railroad.

Early in the 20th century, the Enochs traded some of their timberland for stock in the newly formed Great Southern Lumber Company at Bogalusa, Louisiana, and Isaac Enochs became a director in Great Southern.

In 1913, a ruling by the Interstate Commerce Commission resulted in dissolution of the Enochs brothers partnership so as to separate their lumber business from their railroad enterprises. Near Fernwood, the Enochs began farming and raised cattle and hogs on their cutover land to promote settlement. In 1914, the brothers established Enochs Farms, but it was sold in 1920.

Fernwood Lumber Company continued operation into the late 1920s, but closed when the last of the virgin pines were cut. In the 1930s, the Enochs family established other wood product companies which became Fernwood Industries, with specialization in pressure treated timber.
