= Great Western Railway of Colorado =

Class III Railroad in Colorado

Great Western Railway
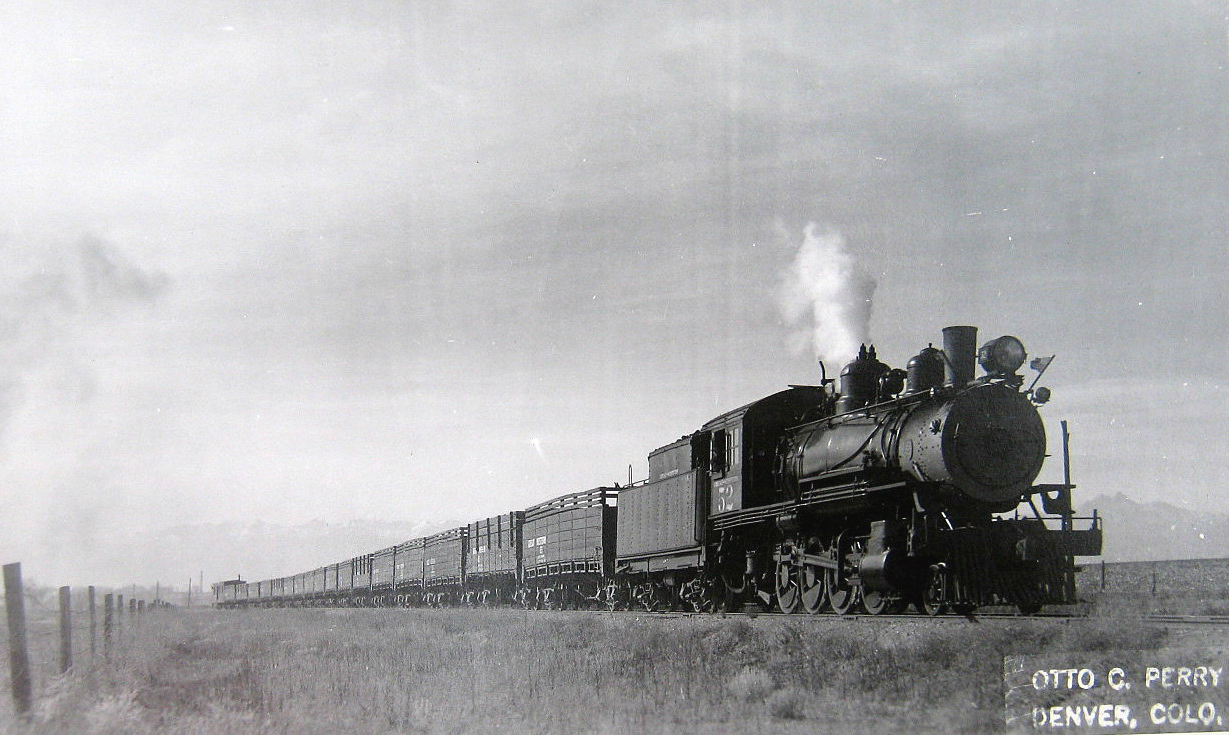
- Great Western 2-8-0 52

Overview
- Headquarters: Loveland, Colorado
- Reporting mark: GWR
- Locale: Northeastern Colorado
- Dates of operation: 1902–present

Technical
- Track gauge: 4 ft 8 1/2 in (1,435 mm) standard gauge
- Length: 80 miles (130 km)

Other
- Website: omnitrax.com/our-company/our-railroads/great-western-railway-of-colorado-llc/

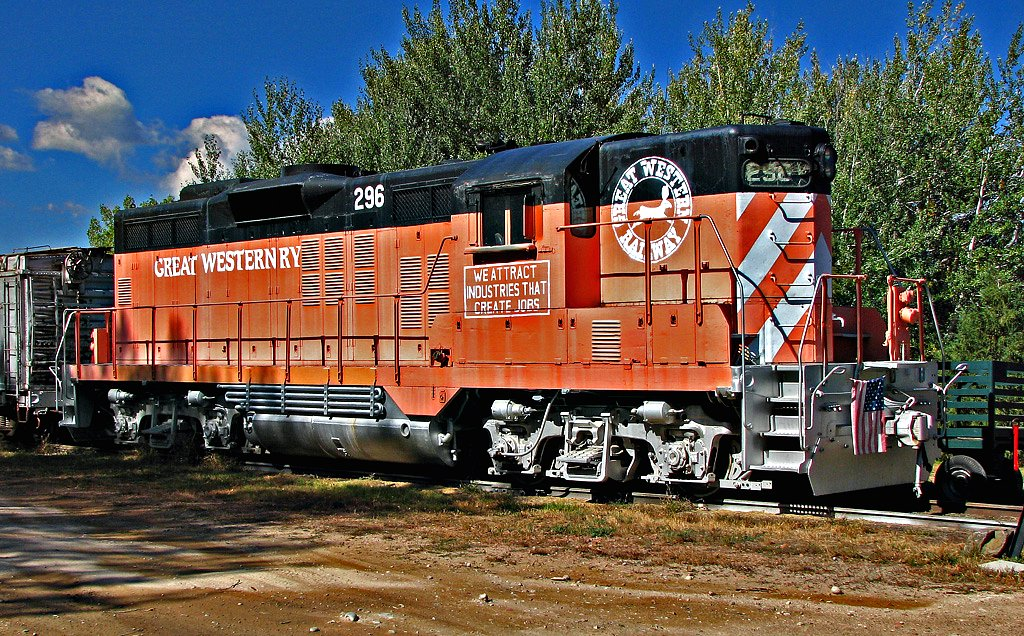
Great Western Railway GP-9 #296, built 1954, retired 2003. Now being restored at Heber Valley Railroad.

The Great Western Railway of Colorado (reporting mark GWR) operates about 80 miles (129 km) of track in Colorado and interchanges with the Union Pacific Railroad as well as the BNSF Railway. It is currently a subsidiary of OmniTRAX but was founded in 1902 to serve the Great Western Sugar Company and other sugar beet and molasses companies in Colorado, and built by another Great Western subsidiary, Loveland Construction Company. It also operated passenger services from 1917 to 1926. Their route consists of a line from Loveland to Johnstown, Colorado, where it splits to Miliken and Longmont. Going north out of Kelim is Windsor where once again the line splits to go to their industrial park and Greeley, or Fort Collins. It has since expanded service to include customers such as Anheuser-Busch, Eastman Kodak and Simplot.

== See also ==
- Great Western 90, one of Great Western's former locomotives
- Great Western 60
