= Oneida and Western Railroad =

The Oneida & Western Railroad (reporting mark O&W), known as the Oneida & Western, was two different railroads.

The first was a short coal and goods hauling railroad that ran between Oneida and Jamestown, Tennessee. It was prosperous during the 1920s, hauling coal and lumber and provided groceries and mail to residents along the O&W in the remote gorges and hollows of Scott and Fentress counties. The line also provided a passenger service that at the time, was the most efficient way to travel.

In the 1940s the Wolf Creek Dam project was a ray of hope for the O&W, but World War II ended that hope and the project was lost along with the large investment made by the railroad's owners. Abandonment was announced in 1946, however the Jewell Ridge Mine purchased the railroad and held on to it until 1953 when abandonment was officially requested due to sagging business in the area. The last train operated on March 31, 1954.

Local citizens opposed the railroad's abandonment, however the implementation of better highway and trucks were a considerable competitor, local citizens and former employees blamed poor management as the cause for abandonment.

The second, Oneida & Western Transportation (OWTX), was a railroad with no track. In the 1970s, the Shamrock Coal Company was having trouble with its primary hauler, the Louisville & Nashville, unable to supply empty cars fast enough to meet demand. Increased haulage rates and inadequate maintenance made things more difficult for Shamrock. The coal company responded by buying its own cars and locomotives, built to L&N specifications, in 1979. These were run as L&N-trains by L&N crews, but gave Shamrock lower rates for transportation and a guaranteed supply of trains/cars. The name Oneida and Western was resurrected for the attractive two-tone green trains. The coal was exclusively sold and hauled to a South Carolina Electric & Gas power plant in Wateree. After the L&N was bought by CSX in 1987, and Shamrock was bought by Sun Coal in the same year, the changed situation rendered the dedicated O&W-trains unnecessary. Sun Coal and CSX agreed to a new contract for "ordinary" trains, and the O&W-equipment was sold.
