= New Hope Railroad =

Small heritage railroad based in Eastern Pennsylvania

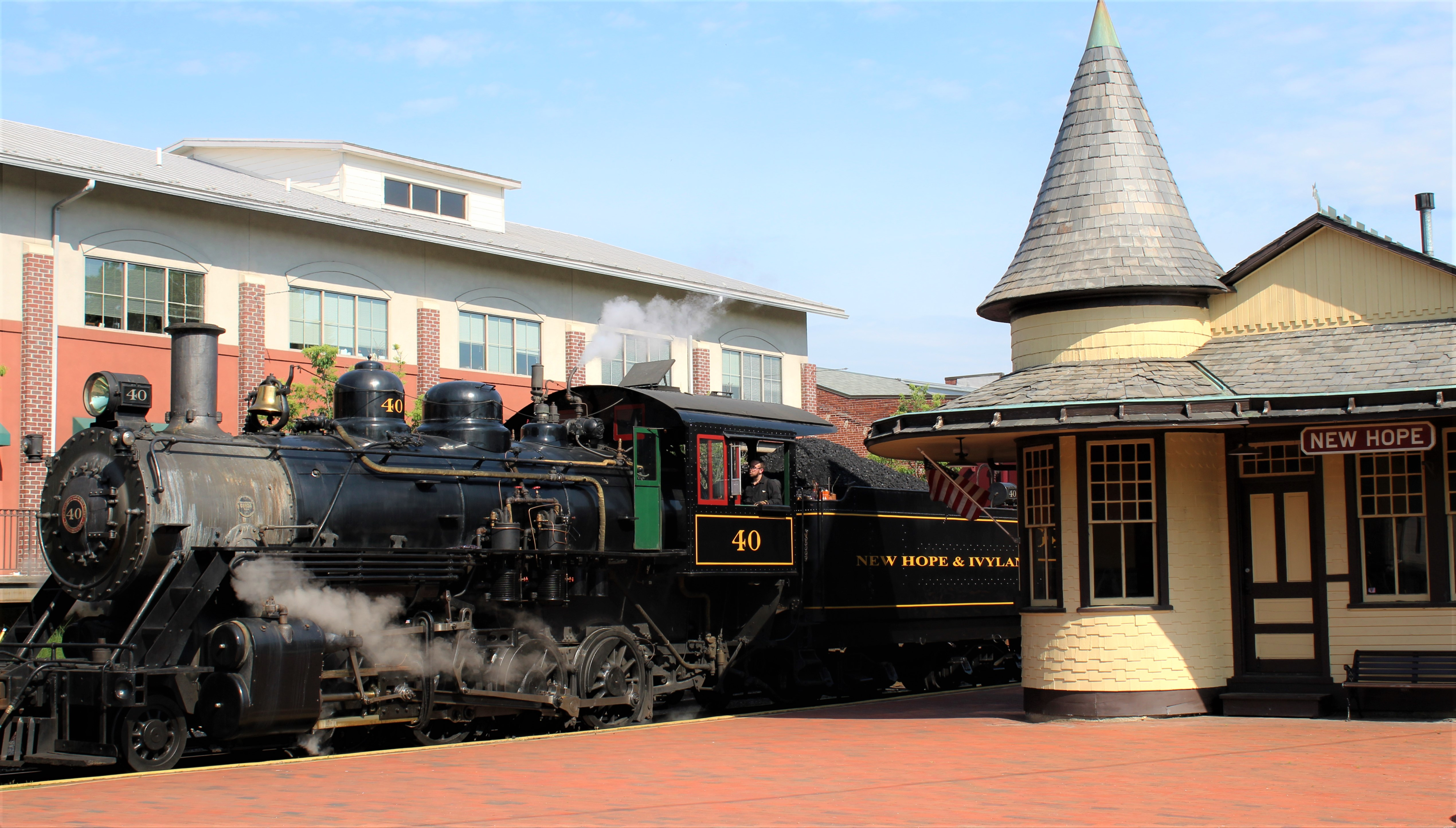
- No. 40 at New Hope Station in May 2019

Overview
- Headquarters: New Hope, Pennsylvania, U.S.
- Reporting mark: NHRR
- Locale: Bucks County, Pennsylvania, U.S.
- Dates of operation: 1966–present

Technical
- Track gauge: 4 ft 8 1/2 in (1,435 mm) standard gauge
- Length: 18 miles (29 km)

Other
- Website: www.newhoperailroad.com

The New Hope Railroad (reporting mark NHRR), formerly and colloquially known as the New Hope and Ivyland Railroad and the New Hope Steam Railway and Museum, is a shortline and heritage railroad located in New Hope, Pennsylvania. Today, the railroad operates both steam and diesel powered locomotives and is an associate member of Northeast Operating Rules Advisory Committee.

== Services ==
=== Heritage ===
The heritage operations use both steam and diesel powered locomotives for excursion trips out of New Hope. Regular NHRR excursions typically operate between New Hope and Lahaska, with some occasionally going to Buckingham Valley. The railroad mostly uses former Reading Company passenger cars, which date between 1914 and 1932, for excursions.

=== Freight ===
NHRR is involved in the import and export of raw materials and manufactured products. Freight customers range from national chemical companies to consumer product manufacturers. NHRR interchanges with Pennsylvania Northeastern Railroad in Johnsville, which in turn interchanges with CSX Transportation in Lansdale. NHRR's primary customers are based in Warminster; CRC Industries, Castrol and Double H Plastics are served on a weekly basis.

== History ==
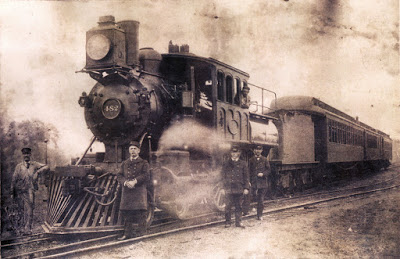
The first train to New Hope in 1891

The line currently operated by the New Hope Railroad was originally known as the New Hope Branch of the Reading Company (RDG), which leased it to the North Pennsylvania Railroad, of which it was a part. The railroad ran as far as Hartsville Station (near Bristol Road, which eventually became Ivyland) until March 29, 1891, when the line was extended to the long-desired terminal of New Hope, Pennsylvania.

In 1932, steam powered trains above Hatboro were replaced with a Doodlebug after electric service was introduced between Hatboro and Philadelphia. In June 1952, Hatboro-New Hope passenger service terminated. In the early 1960s, the RDG's financial situation was precarious. Looking to rid themselves of unprofitable branch lines via abandonment, a group of train aficionados and businessmen led by Philadelphia attorney Kenneth Souser established Steam Trains, Inc. with the goal of operating steam trains on a for-profit basis. Steam Trains, Inc. became organized as the 'New Hope & Ivyland Railroad (NHIR), and on June 20, 1966, the 16.7-mile line was sold for $200,000.

Steam Trains, Inc. started their operations on August 6, 1966, often in an extravagant fashion, with the purchase of four steam locomotives and seven passenger cars. The company leased freight locomotives from RDG, and used only hired labor to operate their excursions. The "air rights" over the Southern portion of the line from Ivyland to just north of Almshouse Road, were sold to the former Philadelphia Electric Company (now Exelon) in order to stay solvent. Due to extremely low ticket prices to generate sales that led to no additional income of riders, Steam Trains, Inc. declared bankruptcy on June 5, 1970. Operations continued under a court-appointed trustee.

The Bucks County Industrial Development Corporation (BCIDC) purchased the trackage from the Steam Trains, Inc. in early 1974 to "preserve rail service through the center of Bucks County." The county selected McHugh Brothers Heavy Hauling, Inc. to operate freight service over the line via a lease agreement. McHugh Brothers continued hauling freight with Edward L. McHugh as president until his departure in 1989.

By the summer of 1976, the railroad received state funding to rehabilitate crumbling infrastructure that sorely needed fixing. By August 1977, volunteers from the Buckingham Valley Trolley Association [BVTA] (now the Electric City Trolley Museum Association) were operating state-sponsored passenger service connecting the touristy town of New Hope with SEPTA/Conrail commuter trains at Warminster. Bucks County had made a wise investment, as both passenger and freight service flourished during the 1970s once track upgrades were made. Finally, on June 30, 1979, NHRR finally emerged from its decade-long bankruptcy.

Beginning July 3, 1980, volunteers of the New Hope Steam Railway (NHOP) resumed weekend excursion service after the BVTA decided to end it. The NHOP ran trains under a lease agreement with the BCIDC until 1990, when the line and its equipment were once again in a state of decay and disrepair. The McHugh Bros. operated NHIR until 1989 when their lease ended and the Morristown & Erie was contracted to operate the railroad. The BCIDC sold the line outright to the for-profit Bucks County Railroad Preservation and Restoration Corporation (BCRP&RC) in 1990, who slowly began to rebuild the railroad to its current state of good repair. In 1993, the reporting mark was changed to NHRR. BCRP&RC is the official corporate structure, doing business as the New Hope Railroad.

== Equipment ==
=== Locomotives ===
Locomotive details
Number	Image	Type	Model	Built	Builder	Former owner	Status
40		Steam	2-8-0	1925	Baldwin Locomotive Works	Lancaster and Chester Railroad	Undergoing 1,472-day inspection and overhaul
1533		Steam	4-6-0	1911	Montreal Locomotive Works	Canadian National Railway	Stored, awaiting possible restoration
8218		Diesel	GP9u	1957	Electro-Motive Diesel	Canadian Pacific Railway	Operational
2198		Diesel	GP30	1963	Electro-Motive Diesel	Pennsylvania Railroad	Operational
5577		Diesel	SD40-2	1972	Electro-Motive Diesel	Canadian Pacific Railway	Operational
7010		Diesel	GP9u	1959	Electro-Motive Diesel	Canadian National Railway	Operational
901		Diesel	GP39	1967	Electro-Motive Diesel	Utah Transit Authority	Operational

=== Former units ===
Locomotive details
Number	Image	Type	Model	Built	Builder	Former owner	Owner
9		Steam	0-6-0	1942	American Locomotive Company	United States Army, Virginia Blue Ridge Railway	SMS Rail Lines
3028		Steam	4-8-4	1946	American Locomotive Company	Ferrocarriles Nacionales de México	ALCO Technical & Historical Society
7087		Diesel	C30-7	1981	General Electric	Seaboard Coast Line, CSX	None (scrapped)

=== Rolling stock ===
Rolling stock details
Number	Image	Type	Built	Builder
72		Baggage car	1923	American Car and Foundry Company
870		Coach	1932	Bethlehem Steel Company
983		Coach	1923	Central Railroad of New Jersey
1096		Tool car	1960	Pullman-Standard Corporation
1127		Coach	1924	Harlan and Hollingsworth
1220		Coach	1922	Harlan and Hollingsworth
1424		Coach	1914	Harlan and Hollingsworth
1430		Dining car	1914	Harlan and Hollingsworth
1505		Coach	1916	Harlan and Hollingsworth
1525		Open air/observation car	1927	Harlan and Hollingsworth
1536		Coach	1927	Harlan and Hollingsworth
2817		Event car	1955	Long Island Rail Road
4907		Dining car	1919	Canadian Car and Foundry
9123		Coach	1932	Bethlehem Steel Company
800301		Dining car	1949	American Car and Foundry Company
303		Hopper car	1955	Pullman-Standard
1606		Tank car	1948	Fleischmann Transportation Company
1753		Tank car	1927	Pennsylvania Tank Car Company
3752		Tank car	1936	Union Tank Car Company
6622		Tank car	1940	American Car and Foundry Company
8435		Boxcar	1931	Magor Car Corp.
1113		Coach	1924	Harlan and Hollingsworth
1366		Open-air car	1918	Harlan and Hollingsworth
8570		Boxcar	1934	Magor Car Corp.
9005		Boxcar	1942	Despatch Shops Inc.
9811		Boxcar	1952	Pullman-Standard
12153		Hopper	1944	Bethlehem Steel
38009		Flatcar	1951	Magor Car Corp.
53033		Dump car	1957	Eastern Car Ltd.
480047		Flatcar	1959	Pennsylvania Railroad Samuel Rea Shops
C127		Caboose	1921	Laconia Car Company

== See also ==
- List of heritage railroads in the United States
- Pennsylvania Northeastern Railroad
- New Hope Railroad 40
