= Canadian Pacific 1286 =

Preserved CP G5d class 4-6-2 locomotive

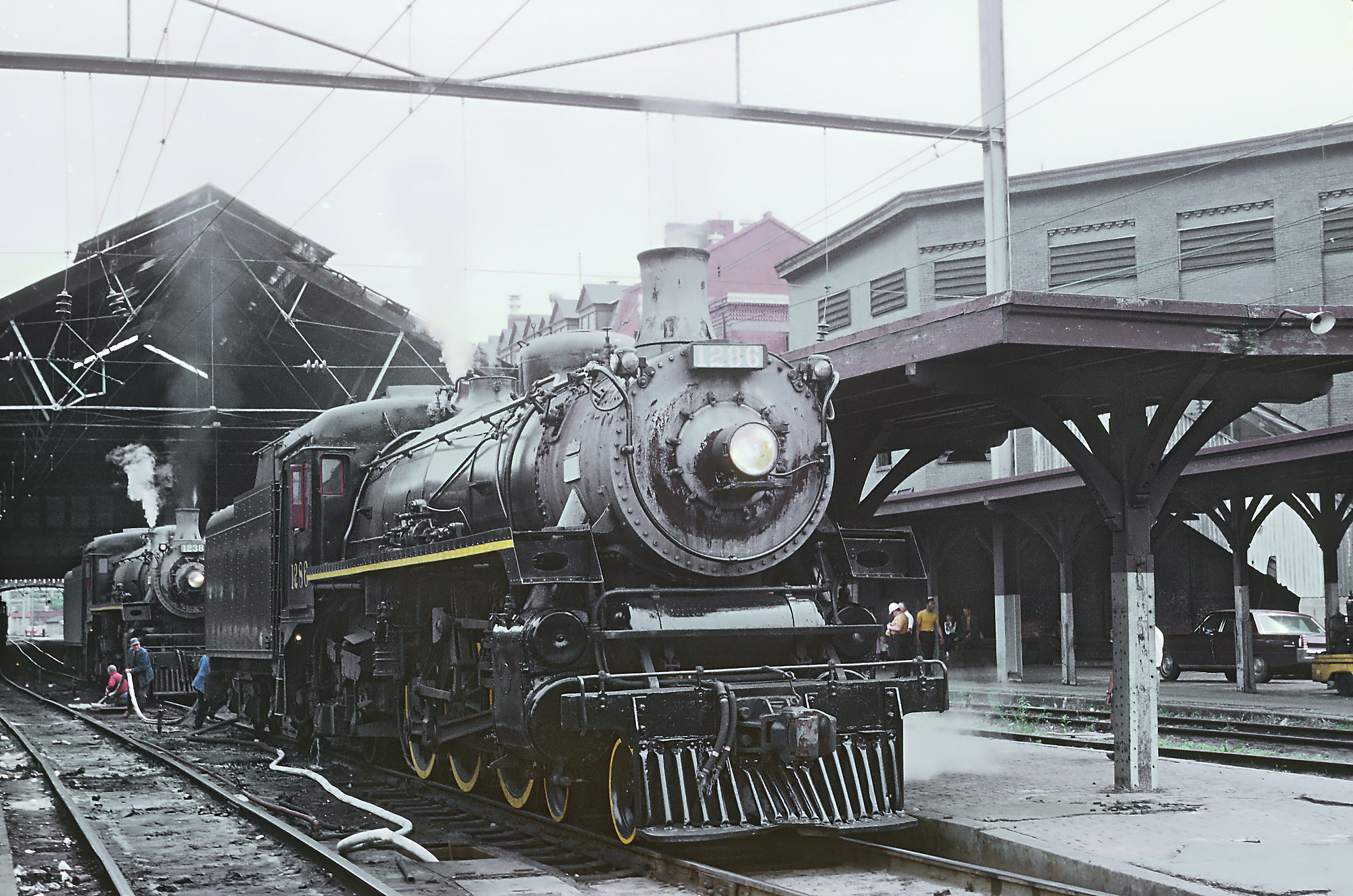
- Nos. 1286 and 1238 at Harrisburg Central Railroad Station, Pennsylvania, United States, May 18, 1969
Type and origin
- Power type: Steam
- Builder: Canadian Locomotive Company
- Serial number: 2443
- Build date: June 1948
Specifications
- Configuration
  - Whyte: 4-6-2
  - UIC: 2′C1′ h2
- Gauge: 4 ft 8 1/2 in (1,435 mm)
- Driver dia.: 70 in (1,780 mm)
- Trailing dia.: 45 in (1,140 mm)
- Wheelbase
  - Drivers: 15 ft (4.6 m)
- Length: 76 ft 4 1/8 in (23.270 m)
- Height: 14 ft 10 in (4.52 m)
- Axle load: 50,300 lb (22.8 t)
- Adhesive weight: 151,000 lb (68 t)
- Loco weight: 229,500 lb (104.1 t)
- Tender weight: 191,000 lb (87 t)
- Total weight: 420,500 lb (190.7 t)
- Fuel type: Coal
- Fuel capacity: 28,000 lb (13 t)
- Water cap.: 9,600 imp gal (44,000 L; 11,500 US gal)
- Firebox
  - Grate area: 45.6 sq ft (4.24 m^{2})
- Boiler pressure: 250 psi (1.72 MPa)
- Heating surface
  - Firebox: 199 sq ft (18.5 m^{2})
  - Total surface: 3,320 sq ft (308 m^{2})
- Superheater
  - Heating area: 744 sq ft (69.1 m^{2})
- Cylinders: Two, outside
- Cylinder size: 20 in × 28 in (510 mm × 710 mm)
- Valve gear: Walschaerts
- Valve type: Piston valves
- Loco brake: Air
- Train brakes: Air
- Couplers: Knuckle
Performance figures
- Tractive effort: 34,000 lbf (150 kN)
- Factor of adh.: 4.44
Career
- Operators: Canadian Pacific Railway; Rail Tours Inc.; High Iron Company; Allegany Central Railroad; Virginia Central Railroad
- Class: G5d
- Number in class: 15 of 30
- Numbers: CP 1286; ACRR 1286; VC 1286
- Retired: 1960 (revenue service); 1973 (1st excursion service); October 31, 1997 (2nd excursion service)
- Restored: 1965 (1st excursion service); 1975 (2nd excursion service)
- Current owner: Private owner
- Disposition: Stored out of view

Canadian Pacific 1286 is a preserved G5d class 4-6-2 "Pacific" type steam locomotive built in 1948 by the Canadian Locomotive Company (CLC). It was sold to George Hart, who used it to pull excursion trains in the 1960s. It was eventually sold again to Jack Showalter, who operated it on his Allegany Central Railroad (ACRR) from the early 1970s to the late 1990s. No. 1286 was then stored under private ownership at the Prairie Dog Central Railway (PDC) and put up for auction in 2026, being acquired by the Aspen Crossing Railway. The locomotive is currently being arranged for a move to Alberta.

== History ==
=== Revenue service ===
No. 1286 was constructed in June 1948 by the Canadian Locomotive Company (CLC) in Kingston, Ontario, as the fifteenth member of the Canadian Pacific Railway's (CP) G5d class. It was initially assigned to pull passenger trains and commuter trains throughout Alberta and British Columbia. As steam locomotives were being replaced by diesel locomotives on the CP, No. 1286 served as an emergency backup locomotive, until it was retired in 1960, along with several other G5d class locomotives.

=== Early preservation ===
After sitting in storage for five years, No. 1286 was purchased directly from the CP in 1964 by former Reading Company (RDG) employee George M. Hart, who founded Rail Tours Incorporated to host several steam excursion trains throughout the northeastern United States. No. 1286 was restored in 1965, and it began pulling tours on the Maryland and Pennsylvania Railroad (MPA) in York County alongside other steam locomotives, including CP G5c No. 1238, CP 4-6-0 No. 972, and Reading 0-6-0 st No. 1251. On August 1, while No. 1286 was pulling an excursion over the MPA near York, it derailed and bent its cowcatcher after hitting a pile of gravel created by heavy rain. A diesel locomotive was brought in to help rerail No. 1286, which subsequently returned to service without having its cowcatcher repaired. On some occasions, No. 1286 pulled a series of roundtrip excursion runs on the Western Maryland (WM) mainline between York, Gettysburg, Williamsport, Hagerstown, and Cumberland, and it was accompanied by CP No. 972 during some of the trips.

Beginning in 1967, Ross E. Rowland, the owner of the High Iron Company (HICO), began leasing Nos. 1286 and 1238 from Hart to pull his own excursion trains over the Central Railroad of New Jersey's (CNJ) mainline between Jersey City, New Jersey, and Wilkes-Barre, Pennsylvania.

In early February 1968, a furnace broke down at a power plant in Reading, Pennsylvania, and Nos. 1286 and 1238 were both transferred to the plant to provide emergency warmth. Rowland consequently had to replace the two G5's on a February 18 excursion with fellow CP G5d No. 1278 and Great Western 2-10-0 No. 90.

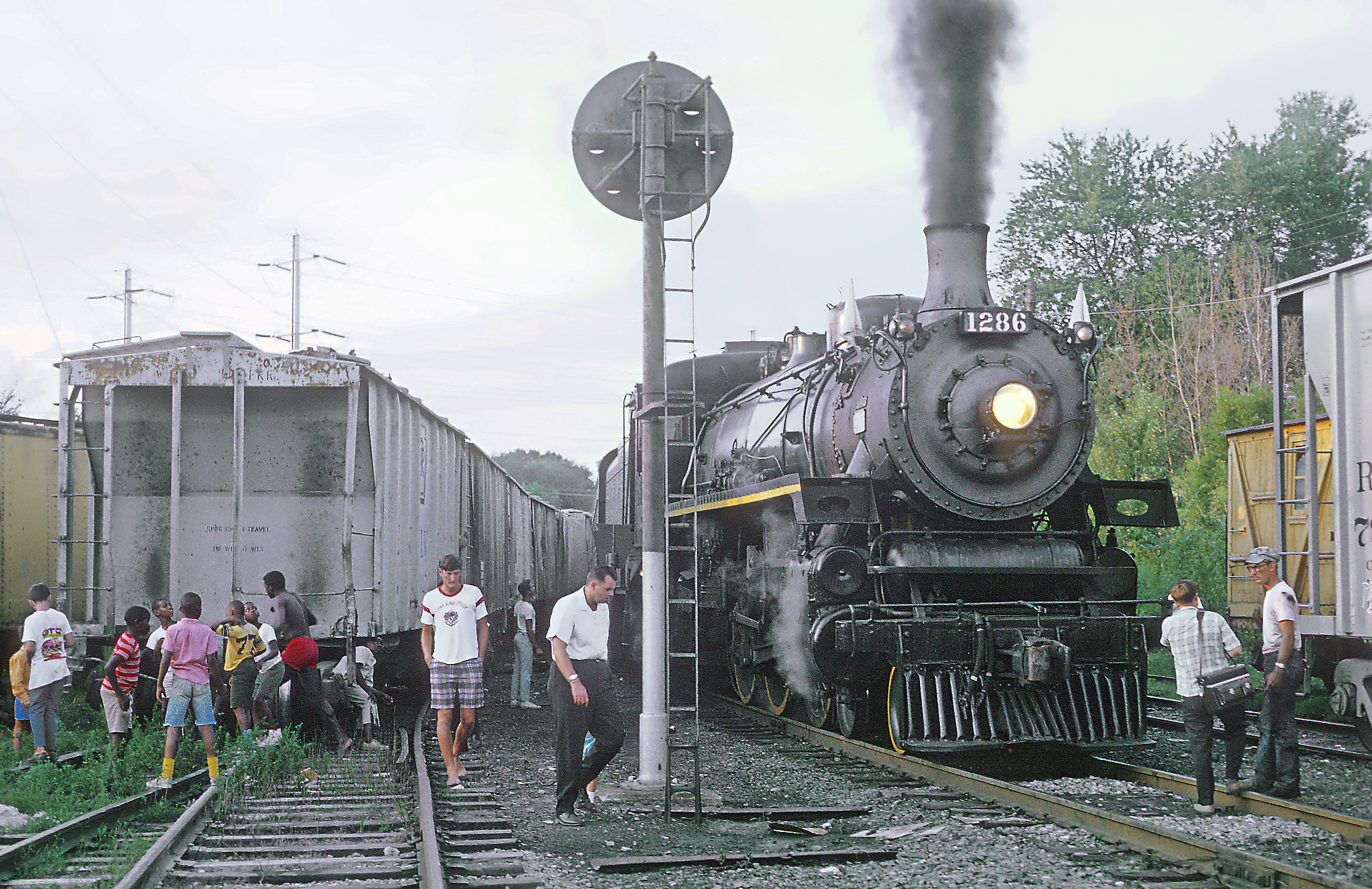
CP No. 1286 stopping at the Pope's Creek Branch in Bowie, Maryland, United States

Once the plant's furnace was fully repaired, Hart removed both locomotives from the city. Rowland continued to use Nos. 1286 and 1238 to pull more excursion trains he had hosted, including the Wilkes-Barre Limited between Wilkes-Barre and Newark, and they were still owned by George Hart until August 1968. With Hart losing sentiment to keep Nos. 1286 and 1238, he sold both of them to John F. Rowe of the Red Clay Valley Railway Equipment and Leasing Company, and he made plans to use both locomotives to power his own excursion trains.

On May 18, 1969, Nos. 1286 and 1238 pulled a double-headed twenty-car excursion train from Baltimore, Maryland, to Harrisburg, Pennsylvania, over two Penn Central branch lines for the Baltimore Chapter of the National Railway Historical Society (NRHS). The trip, however, was plagued with various mechanical issues. The fireman who was in control of No. 1286 that day allowed the fire inside the firebox to burn through one of the fire grates, causing the locomotive to lose steam pressure. With No. 1238 having running gear problems, No. 1286 pulled the train to Harrisburg unassisted, in spite of its firebox issues. After a photo session at the station, a Penn Central diesel locomotive was coupled in front of the two G5s to pull the train back to Baltimore after dawn. By 1973, No. 1286 was no longer in service under John Rowe’s ownership.

=== Jack Showalter ownership ===
In 1973, No. 1286 was purchased along with No. 1238 by Jack Showalter, and he moved both locomotives to Covington, Virginia, to be extensively overhauled. Showalter was the founder of the Alleghany Central Railroad (ACRR), which was a 15-mile (24 km) tourist railroad that originally lay over the Chesapeake and Ohio Railway's (C&O) Hot Springs branch between Intervale and Covington. Crews repaired No. 1286's bent cowcatcher during its overhaul and repaint. The locomotive was brought back under steam in 1975, and it began pulling tourist trains at 15 mph (24 km/h) along a tributary of the James River. On one occasion, an ex-Chicago, Burlington and Quincy office car derailed after dawn with several ACRR crews off duty, so Showalter gathered two railfans and some of his friends to help him rerail it, using chunks of wood, and No. 1286 was used to push the car back. After the 1984 operating season, however, the ACRR was forced to vacate the Hot Springs branch after ownership disputes took place, and the branch was subsequently ripped up.

In 1988, Showalter approached the Scenic Railroad Development Corporation (SRDC), who agreed to allow the ACRR, who changed their name to the Allegany Central Railroad, to use their newly restored trackage, which was formerly operated by the WM. After Showalter's equipment was moved to Ridgeley, West Virginia, the ACRR began operations in 1989 to host trains from Cumberland, Maryland, through the Allegheny Mountains to Frostburg, Maryland, and back. Since No. 1286 was due for an overhaul, it was undergoing repairs in Ridgeley, and it did not return to service until May 1990. No. 1286 pulled the last train the ACRR hosted on the Cumberland line on December 8, 1990, before Showalter and the SRDC ran into ownership disputes that prevented them from renewing their leasing contract. The SRDC subsequently changed their name to the Western Maryland Scenic Railroad to begin operating their own trains with their own locomotives, such as Lake Superior and Ishpeming 2-8-0 No. 34, and eventually, C&O 2-6-6-2 No. 1309.

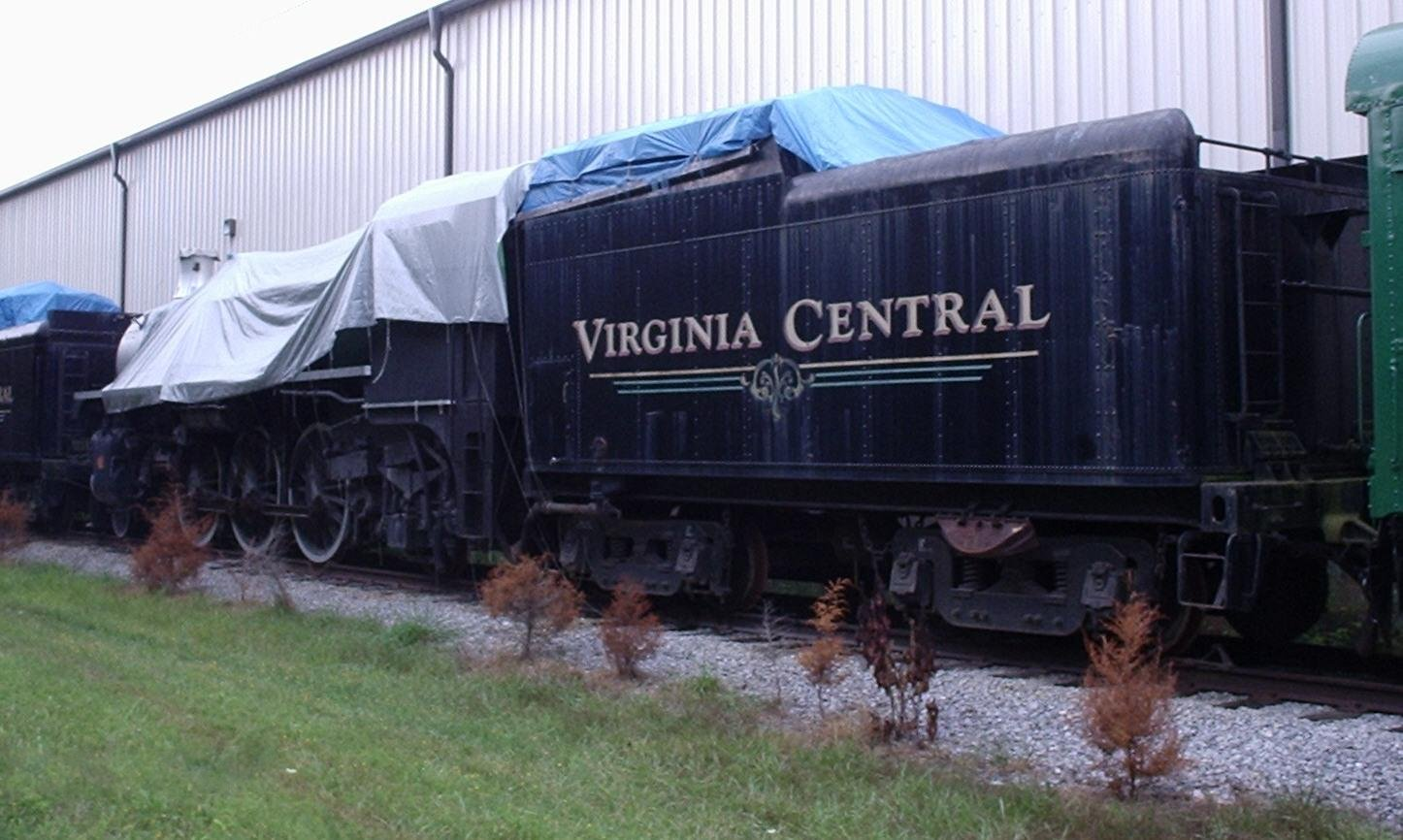
No. 1286 stored underneath a tarp in Staunton, Virginia, United States, in 2006

By 1992, No. 1286 was moved along with the rest of the ACRR's equipment to Gordonsville, Virginia, for temporary storage, while Showalter was in search for a new home for his equipment. On October 23, 1993, No. 1286 lead a tripleheader in front of No. 1238 and EMD GP9 No. 40 to pull the ACRR's equipment to Staunton over the CSX mainline, but not before the ACRR further changed their name to the Virginia Central Railroad (VC). Subsequently, No. 1286 led two double-headed excursion trains on October 30 and 31, with the first train running between Charlottesville and Clifton Forge and the second train running between Charlottesville and Gordonsville. The following month, however, CSX began rising the insurance costs, and Showalter could no longer afford to run his trains on their mainline trackage. No. 1286's last run occurred in October 1997 before it was put into storage on the Shenandoah Valley Railroad (SVRR), with Showalter living inside a camping trailer to protect his equipment from vandals. In 2004, No. 1286 was moved to Verona to be stored while covered with tarps.

In November 2014, Showalter died.

=== Disposition ===
After Showalter's death his equipment was auctioned off as part of a liquidation sale, and in 2015, No. 1286 was purchased with No. 1238 by a private owner from Alberta. In July of that year, the locomotive was towed back to Staunton to be lifted onto a flatcar with its tender on a separate car with No. 1238's tender, and it was subsequently moved on the CSX mainline before it interchanged with the CP to be hauled to Manitoba. On September 13, No. 1286 arrived in Winnipeg, and as it was lifted off the flatcar, it touched Canadian soil for the first time since it was sold to Hart in 1964.

In May 2026, No. 1286 was put up for auction and listed at CA$450,000, albeit the price was later reduced to CA$399,000. On August 12, 2026, a bid for CA$250,000 was placed on behalf of the Aspen Crossing Railway in Southern Alberta and the locomotive was immediately sold. It is currently being arranged to have No. 1286 moved to Alberta.

== Appearances in media ==
- In the fall of 1991, Nos. 1286 and 1238 were two of five mainline steam locomotives scheduled to be filmed in Illinois for Night Ride Down, an action historical movie set around a 1930s labor union strike. The other locomotives planned to be filmed were Nickel Plate Road 765, 587, and Reading 2100, and many other locomotives were considered. One of the two CPR G5s was reportedly considered to be cosmetically altered to represent Pennsylvania Railroad K4 No. 3768. Paramount Pictures executives cancelled production due to the early 1990s recession, and when lead actor Harrison Ford left the project over script changes.
- No. 1286's last run under Showalter ownership occurred on October 31, 1997. It was fired up that day while fitted with a fake diamond smokestack to be filmed in Staunton for the 1998 Hallmark Hall of Fame film The Love Letter, which starred Campbell Scott, Jennifer Jason Leigh, and David Dukes, and it was directed by Dan Curtis.

== Surviving sister engines ==
- No. 1201 is on static display inside the Canada Science and Technology Museum in Ottawa, Ontario, Canada.
- No. 1238 is with No. 1286 in storage at the Prairie Dog Central Railway in Winnipeg, Manitoba, Canada, awaiting to be moved to the Waterloo Central Railway.
- No. 1246 is in storage at the Railroad Museum of New England in Thomaston, Connecticut, United States.
- No. 1278 is on static display at the Age of Steam Roundhouse in Sugarcreek, Ohio, United States.
- No. 1293 is on static display at the Age of Steam Roundhouse in Sugarcreek, Ohio, United States, awaiting for a rebuild.

== Bibliography ==
- Paulus, Brian (2017). The Western Maryland Railway: Baltimore to Cumberland & the New Line. AuthorHouse. ISBN 978-1-5246-5118-3.
