= Canadian Pacific 1238 =

Preserved CP G5c class 4-6-2 locomotive

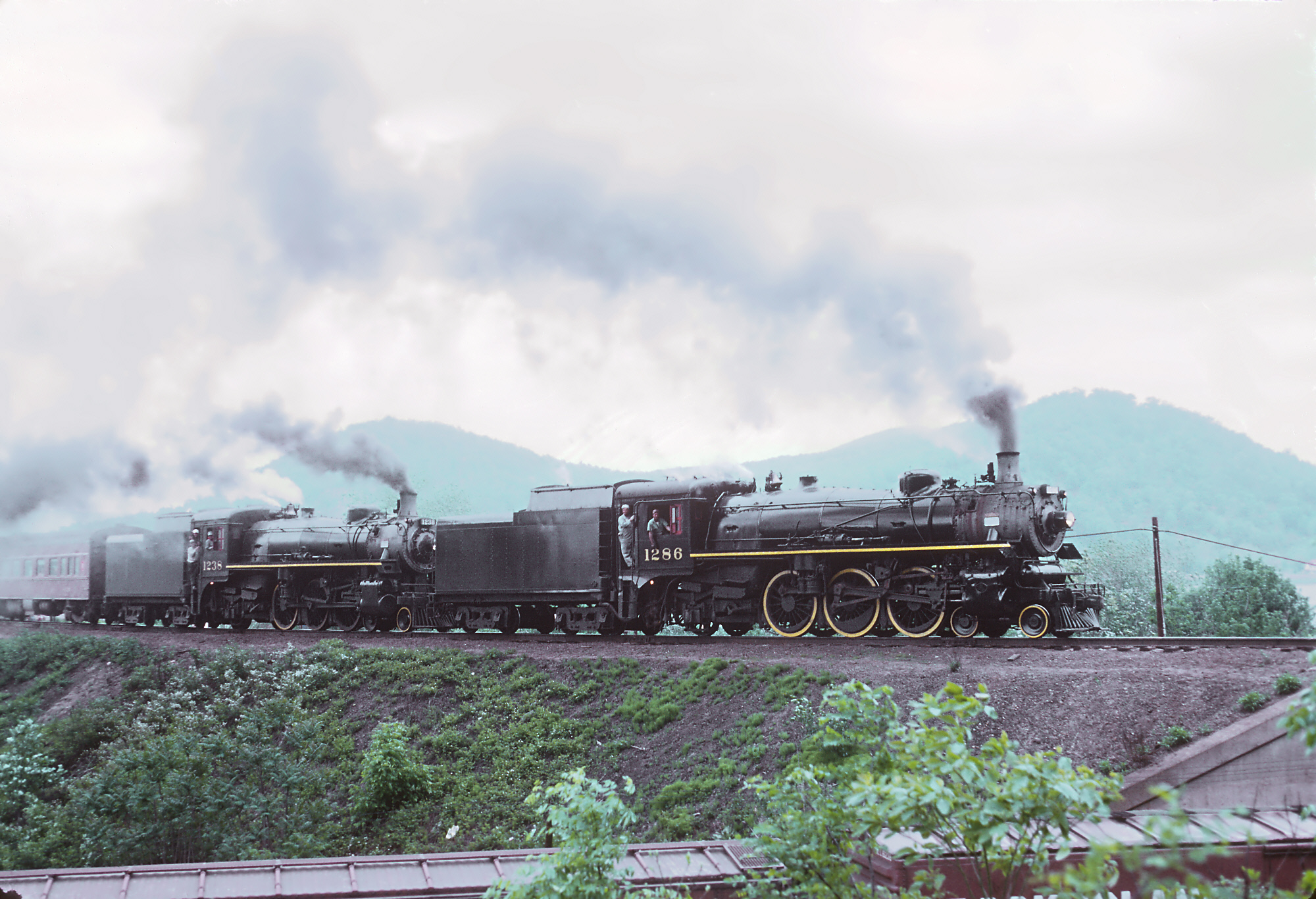
- CP No. 1238 (left) doubleheading with No. 1286 (right) over Rockville Bridge in Harrisburg, Pennsylvania, May 18, 1969
Type and origin
- Power type: Steam
- Builder: Montreal Locomotive Works
- Serial number: 74898
- Build date: June 1946
Specifications
- Configuration
  - Whyte: 4-6-2
  - UIC: 2′C1′ h2
- Gauge: 4 ft 8 1/2 in (1,435 mm)
- Leading dia.: 33 in (840 mm)
- Driver dia.: 70 in (1,780 mm)
- Trailing dia.: 45 in (1,140 mm)
- Wheelbase
  - Drivers: 15 ft (4.6 m)
- Length: 76 ft 4 1/8 in (23.270 m)
- Height: 14 ft 10 in (4.52 m)
- Axle load: 50,300 lb (22.8 t)
- Adhesive weight: 151,000 lb (68.5 t)
- Loco weight: 229,500 lb (104.1 t)
- Tender weight: 191,000 lb (86.6 t)
- Total weight: 420,500 lb (190.7 t)
- Fuel type: Coal
- Fuel capacity: 28,000 lb (13 t)
- Water cap.: 9,600 imp gal (44,000 L; 11,500 US gal)
- Firebox
  - Grate area: 45.6 sq ft (4.24 m^{2})
- Boiler pressure: 250 psi (1.7 MPa)
- Heating surface
  - Firebox: 199 sq ft (18.5 m^{2})
  - Total surface: 3,320 sq ft (308 m^{2})
- Superheater
  - Heating area: 744 sq ft (69.1 m^{2})
- Cylinders: Two, outside
- Cylinder size: 20 in × 28 in (510 mm × 710 mm)
- Valve gear: Walschaerts
- Loco brake: Air
- Train brakes: Air
- Couplers: Knuckle
Performance figures
- Tractive effort: 34,000 lbf (150 kN)
- Factor of adh.: 4.44
Career
- Operators: Canadian Pacific Railway; Rail Tours Inc.; High Iron Company; Allegany Central Railroad; Southern Railway
- Class: G5c
- Number in class: 6th of 40
- Numbers: CP 1238; ACRR 1238; VCRR 1238
- Retired: 1959 (revenue service); 1973 (1st excursion service); October 31, 1993 (2nd excursion service)
- Preserved: December 1964
- Restored: 1966 (1st excursion service); 1975 (2nd excursion service)
- Current owner: Waterloo Central Railway
- Disposition: Stored, awaiting to be moved

Canadian Pacific 1238 is a preserved G5c class 4-6-2 "Pacific" type steam locomotive, built by the Montreal Locomotive Works (MLW) in June 1946. It was purchased by George Hart, who used it for excursion service in the 1960s. It was later sold to Jack Showalter, who operated it on his Allegany Central Railroad (ACRR) from the 1970s to the mid-1990s. In late December 2023, No. 1238 was purchased by the Waterloo Central Railway (WCR), and they have plans to restore the locomotive to operating condition.

== History ==
=== Revenue service ===
No. 1238 was constructed in June 1946 at the Montreal Locomotive Works (MLW) in Montreal, Quebec, as the sixth member of the Canadian Pacific Railway's (CP) G5c class. It was initially assigned to pull passenger trains throughout Quebec and Ontario, and as the CP dieselized their locomotive fleet, No. 1238 was reassigned to pull freight trains. It was retired from revenue service by 1959, and it sat idle for the next five years.

=== Early preservation ===
In December 1964, No. 1238 was purchased by steam locomotive historian George M. Hart, who founded Rail Tours Incorporated to host several steam-powered excursion trains throughout the Northeastern United States. No. 1238 was moved to York, Pennsylvania, where Hart and his crews restored the locomotive back to service in 1966. From there, it began pulling excursion trains on the Maryland and Pennsylvania Railroad (MPA) between York and Baltimore, Maryland, alongside Hart's other steam locomotives, including CP G5d No. 1286, CP 4-6-0 No. 972, and Reading 0-6-0ST No. 1251. The locomotive would also pull trains on mainlines owned by nearby class 1 railroads, such as the Reading, the Western Maryland (WM), the Central Railroad of New Jersey (CNJ), and the Lehigh and Hudson River (L&HR).

In 1967, another steam locomotive preservationist, Ross E. Rowland, began leasing both Nos. 1238 and 1286 from Hart to pull his own excursion trains over the CNJ mainline between Jersey City, New Jersey, and Wilkes-Barre, Pennsylvania. In early February 1968, a furnace broke down at a power plant in Reading, Pennsylvania, and Hart had Nos. 1238 and 1286 sent to the plant to provide emergency heated steam. Both locomotives consequently had to be replaced on a February 18 Newark-Wilkes-Barre excursion with CP G5d No. 1278 and Great Western 2-10-0 No. 90.

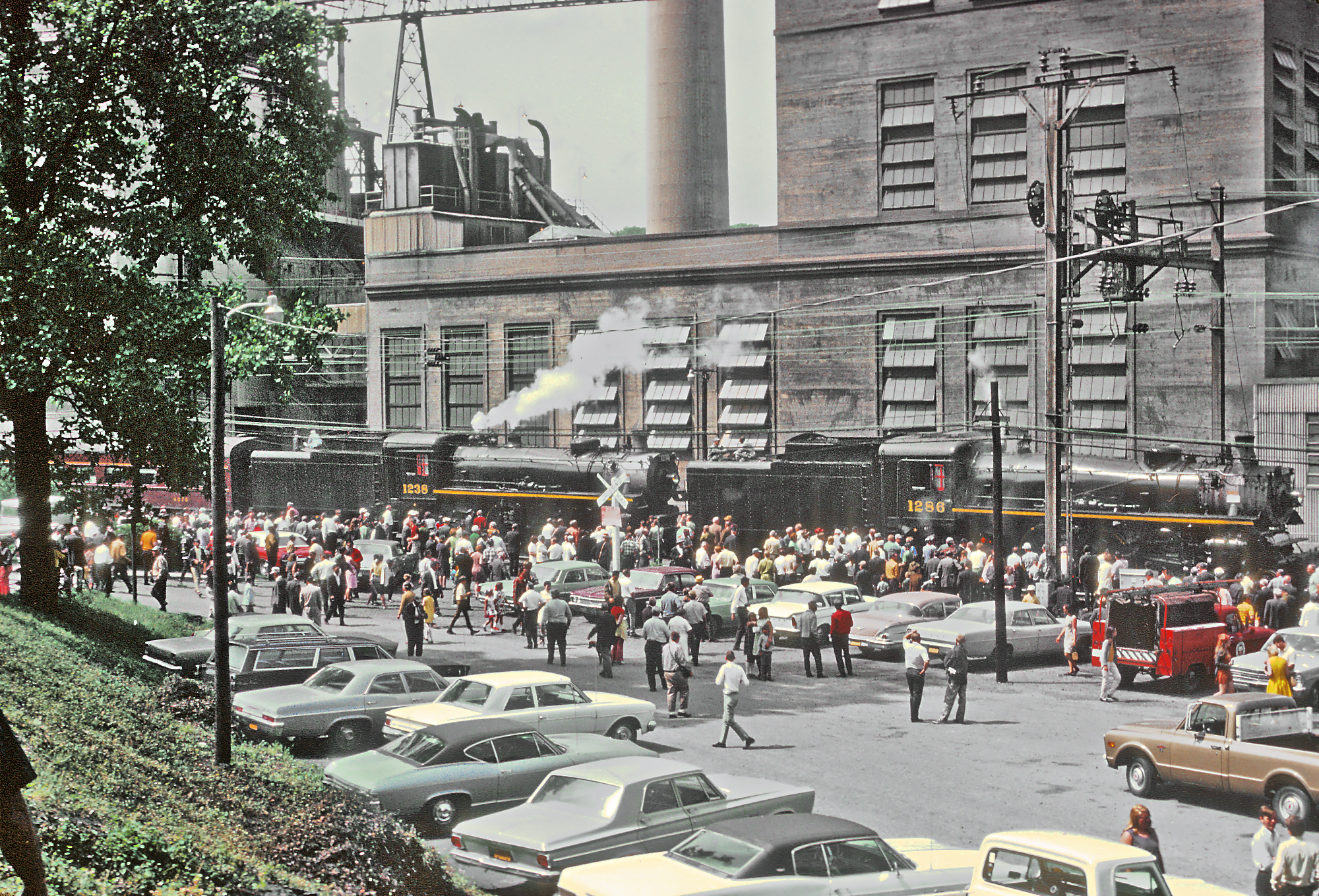
CP No. 1238 stopping at Holtwood, Pennsylvania, with No. 1286, on May 18, 1969

Nos. 1238 and 1286 vacated Reading after the plant's furnace was repaired. In August 1968, without much sentiment to keep his G5 locomotives any longer, George Hart sold Nos. 1238 and 1286 to John F. Rowe of the Red Clay Valley Railway Equipment and Leasing Company. Rowe subsequently made plans to use both locomotives for his own excursion trains.

On May 18, 1969, No. 1238 pulled a double-headed twenty-car excursion train with No. 1286 over Penn Central trackage from Union Station in Baltimore over the Port Deposit Branch and the Columbia Branch to the Transportation Center in Harrisburg, Pennsylvania, on behalf of the Baltimore Chapter of the National Railway Historical Society (NRHS). However, that trip was plagued with various mechanical issues, and both locomotives were in control of Penn Central employees. Along the Port Deposit branch, No. 1238 threw out one of its piston packings, causing its running gear to be disabled, while No. 1286 began losing steam due to firebox issues, and these factors caused the excursion to arrive in Harrisburg later than anticipated. After a photo session took place at the Harrisburg station, Nos. 1238 and 1286 were returned to Baltimore over the former Northern Central line after dawn with a Penn Central diesel locomotive coupled in front as a precaution. Both G5s were subsequently repaired in Baltimore. By 1973, John Rowe was no longer using No. 1238 for excursion service.

=== Jack Showalter ownership ===
In 1973, No. 1238 was sold along with No. 1286 to Jack Showalter, who moved it to Covington, Virginia, for an extensive overhaul. Showalter founded the Alleghany Central tourist railroad (ACRR) along with his family, and it originally lay over the Chesapeake and Ohio Railway's (C&O) 15-mile (24 km) Hot Springs branch between Covington and Intervale. No. 1238 was returned to service in 1975, and it began pulling tourist trains between Covington and Hot Springs at 15 mph (24 km/h) along a tributary of the James River. Throughout June 1981, No. 1238 was loaned to the Southern Railway to fill in for their own steam locomotives, which were all out of service at the time. The locomotive pulled four excursion trains for the Southern in and out of Alexandria, Virginia, for three weekends during that month. In October 1983, the USF&G Insurance company hired the ACRR to provide an excursion train for their patrons. No. 1238 pulled the train on the Chessie System's mainline from Covington to Clifton Forge, Virginia, and then through the Allegheny Mountains to the Greenbrier Resort in White Sulphur Springs, West Virginia. After the 1984 operating season, however, rising insurance costs and ownership disputes forced the ACRR to vacate Covington, and the Hot Springs branch was ripped up with the rails being sold for scrap.

In 1988 Showalter made a deal with the Scenic Railroad Development Corporation (SRDC) to run his trains on their newly restored trackage, which was formerly used by the WM and the Cumberland and Pennsylvania Railroad between Cumberland and Frostburg, Maryland. The ACRR subsequently changed their name to the Allegany Central Railroad, and after their equipment was moved to Ridgeley, West Virginia, No. 1238 began service for the line in the spring of 1989, with No. 1286 being brought back the following year. This operation did not last long, however, since in February 1991, the contract that allowed Showalter to operate on the SRDC's trackage was close to expiring, and disputes prevented him from renewing it. The ACRR operated their last train between Cumberland and Frostburg on December 8, 1990, before the SRDC changed their name to the Western Maryland Scenic Railroad to operate their own trains with their own locomotives, such as Lake Superior and Ishpeming 2-8-0 No. 34, and eventually, C&O 2-6-6-2 No. 1309.

By the beginning of 1992 Showalter moved his equipment to Gordonsville, Virginia, for storage while he was searching for another tourist line to operate his trains on. During this time, the ACRR's name was changed again to the Virginia Central Railroad (VCRR). On October 23, 1993, No. 1238 performed a tripleheader with No. 1286 and EMD GP9 No. 40 to pull the VCRR's rolling stock over the CSX mainline to Staunton. On October 30, Showalter used both G5s to pull one double-headed excursion train on the mainline between Charlottesville and Clifton Forge, as well as a train on October 31 between Charlottesville and Gordonsville. In the beginning of November, CSX raised the insurance costs for Showalter to run his trains on their mainline, and without the ability to afford such a high price, Showalter ceased mainline operations for the VCRR. No. 1238 was subsequently stored on the Shenandoah Valley Railroad (SVRR) while Showalter began searching for another railroad to run his trains on. Beginning in 2004, No. 1238 was being stored in Verona with tarps covering it for protection from the weather. Showalter died in November 2014.

=== Disposition ===
In 2015, No. 1238 was sold off to a private owner from Alberta as part of a liquidation sale. In July of that year, No. 1238 was lifted onto a flatcar with its tender being placed on another along with No. 1286's tender, and the locomotive began its journey to Manitoba in early August. On September 13, No. 1238 arrived on the Prairie Dog Central Railway in Winnipeg.

On July 28, 2023, the Waterloo Central Railway (WCR) of St. Jacobs, Ontario, announced their plans to purchase No. 1238, after raising $150,000. By New Year’s Eve, the WCR raised the required amount of money and purchased the G5c, and they continued to raise funds to move No. 1238 to their property for an operational restoration.

== Appearances in media ==
- During June 1981, while it was still on loan to the Southern Railway, No. 1238 was also used in Montpelier Station (depicting Greenwood), Virginia, during filming of the BBC miniseries Nancy Astor, which starred Lisa Harrow, Lise Hilboldt, and Pierce Brosnan. During this time, No. 1238 was relettered to Chesapeake and Ohio, and it was fitted with a vintage wooden cowcatcher.
- In the fall of 1991, Nos. 1238 and 1286 were two of five mainline steam locomotives scheduled to be filmed in the Chicago area in Illinois for an action historical movie titled Night Ride Down. The other locomotives planned to be filmed were Nickel Plate Road 765, 587, and Reading 2100, and many other locomotives were considered. One of the two CPR G5s was reportedly considered to be cosmetically altered to represent Pennsylvania Railroad streamlined K4 No. 3768. Paramount Pictures executives decided to cancel the movie, due to the early 1990s recession, and when lead actor Harrison Ford left the project over script changes.

== Surviving sister engines ==
- No. 1201 is on static display inside the Canada Science and Technology Museum in Ottawa, Ontario in Canada.
- No. 1246 is in storage at the Railroad Museum of New England in Thomaston, Connecticut in the United States.
- No. 1278 is on static display at the Age of Steam Roundhouse in Sugarcreek, Ohio, in the United States.
- No. 1286 is in storage under private ownership at the Prairie Dog Central Railway in Winnipeg, Manitoba in Canada.
- No. 1293 is on static display at the Age of Steam Roundhouse in Sugarcreek, Ohio in the United States, awaiting for a rebuild.

== Bibliography ==
- Paulus, Brian (2017). The Western Maryland Railway: Baltimore to Cumberland & the New Line. AuthorHouse. ISBN 978-1-5246-5118-3.
