= Allegany Central Railroad =

The Allegany Central Railroad (reporting mark ACRR) was a tourist railroad that took place in three locations from the 1970s to the 1990s. It originally operated in Covington, Virginia, before ownership disputes moved it to Cumberland, Maryland. From there, ownership disputes moved it again to Staunton, Virginia. Rising insurance costs shut down the railroad altogether by the end of the 1990s.

== History ==
=== Original location in Covington, Virginia ===
The Allegany Central Railroad was founded by Jack Showalter in Alleghany County, Virginia, and he acquired Canadian Pacific 4-6-2 steam locomotives Nos 1238 and 1286 to be used for their operations. The Allegany Central originally ran over the Chesapeake and Ohio's former Hot Springs branch between Intervale and Covington from 1975 to 1984. Although, it originally reached Hot Springs, the Hot Springs resort no longer wanted the railroad near them when the C&O abandoned the line, so the line at Hot Springs was ripped up, and the branch was shortened to stop at Intervale. During this time, No. 1238 was featured in the BBC mini series Nancy Astor chronicling the life of Nancy Astor. However, when operations stopped after 1984, the branch was ripped up.

=== Move to Cumberland, Maryland ===
The Allegany Central Railroad's equipment was moved in 1988 to Cumberland, Maryland, where Showalter approached an agreement with the newly-formed Scenic Railroad Development Corporation (SRDC) to operate his trains over their ex-Western Maryland trackage between Cumberland and Frostburg, Maryland. It became the first operator to boast excursion trains on the line, using diesel locomotive No. 40, and it continued to host trains there until 1991, when disputes with the SRDC became insurmountable.

=== Move to Staunton, Virginia ===
The Allegany Central's equipment was moved again to Staunton, Virginia. There, a new excursion company was formed under the name Virginia Central Railroad, operating out of Staunton on the CSX mainline. Increased insurance requirements led to the termination of service, and most of the equipment was stored out of service in Staunton. Jack Showalter died in December 2014.

=== Sale of locomotives ===
The ex-Chesapeake and Ohio EMD GP9 diesel locomotive No. 5940 (received by the City as a donation from CSXT for use on the Western Maryland Scenic Railroad) was in storage on the Shenandoah Valley Railroad as Virginia Central No. 40. It was sold to the new Durbin and Greenbrier Valley Railroad in 2007, for use in freight service. It was reverted to its original identity as C&O No. 5940 in 2018.

Nos 1238 and 1286 were stored in Staunton under tarps for several years, until they were sold to a private owner from Alberta in 2015 after Showalter's death. Both steam locomotives arrived on the Prairie Dog Central Railway in Winnipeg, Manitoba in September of that year.

== Western Maryland Scenic Railroad ==
The line in Maryland is still in operation as the Western Maryland Scenic, using Ex-Lake Superior and Ishpeming 2-8-0 "consolidation" steamer No. 34, albeit renumbered 734 and permanently masqueraded as a Western Maryland locomotive. In 2016, 734 was taken out of operation as it was due for the FRA required boiler inspection. The railroad is now using former Chesapeake and Ohio 2-6-6-2 "Mallet" No. 1309. After considerable project delays, 1309 is in operation. In the interim, excursion trains were operated using period diesel power.
