= Western Maryland Scenic Railroad 734 =

Preserved American 2-8-0 locomotive (LS&I class SC-1)

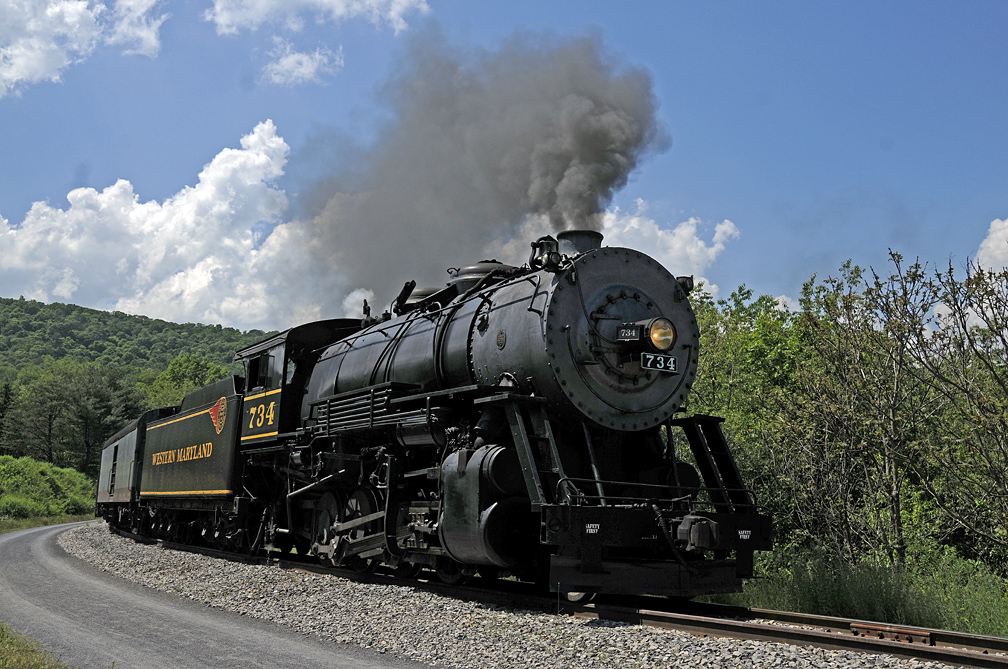
- WMSR No. 734 pulling an excursion on Helmstetter's Curve, on May 31, 2013
Type and origin
- Power type: Steam
- Builder: Baldwin Locomotive Works
- Serial number: 43105
- Build date: April 1916
Specifications
- Configuration
  - Whyte: 2-8-0
  - UIC: 1'D'l
- Gauge: 4 ft 8 1/2 in (1,435 mm)
- Driver dia.: 50 in (1,270 mm)
- Loco weight: 270,000 lb (120,000 kg)
- Fuel type: Coal
- Fuel capacity: New: 12 t (12 long tons; 13 short tons); Now: 18 t (18 long tons; 20 short tons)
- Water cap.: New: 9,500 US gal (36,000 L; 7,900 imp gal); Now: 18,000 US gal (68,000 L; 15,000 imp gal)
- Boiler
  - Diameter: 88 in (2,200 mm)
- Boiler pressure: 200 psi (1,380 kPa)
- Cylinders: Two, outside
- Cylinder size: 26 in × 30 in (660 mm × 760 mm)
- Valve gear: Baker
- Valve type: Piston valves
- Loco brake: Air
- Train brakes: Air
- Couplers: Knuckle
Performance figures
- Tractive effort: New: 55,900 lbf (249 kN); Now: 60,484 lbf (269.05 kN)
Career
- Operators: Lake Superior and Ishpeming Railroad; Western Maryland Scenic Railroad
- Class: SC-1
- Numbers: LS&I 18; LS&I 30; LS&I 34; WMSR 734
- Nicknames: Hog (By LS&I crews); Mountain Thunder (By WMSR)
- Retired: 1961 (revenue service); February 2016 (1st excursion service)
- Restored: July 1993 (1st excursion service)
- Current owner: Western Maryland Scenic Railroad
- Disposition: Undergoing restoration to operating condition

Western Maryland Scenic Railroad 734, also known as Mountain Thunder, is an SC-1 class 2-8-0 "Consolidation" type steam locomotive, built in April 1916 by the Baldwin Locomotive Works (BLW) for the Lake Superior and Ishpeming Railroad (LS&I) as No. 18. It was renumbered to 34 in 1925. No. 34 was used to pull heavy iron ore trains for the LS&I until the late 1950s, and then it was retired from the roster in 1961. The locomotive was subsequently sold to the Marquette and Huron Mountain Railroad, where it was stored in a sideline alongside other LS&I steam locomotives. In 1971, No. 34 was sold to the Illinois Railway Museum (IRM) for static display.

In 1992, No. 34 was acquired by the Western Maryland Scenic Railroad (WMSR), who renumbered it to 734 and cosmetically altered it to resemble a Western Maryland (WM) 2-8-0, and they restored it to operating condition in 1993. For the next twenty-three years, No. 734 pulled the WMSR’s tourist excursion trains and photo charter trains between Cumberland and Frostburg, Maryland. Since 2016, No. 734 has remained out of service for a Federal Railroad Administration (FRA)-mandated 1472 service day inspection, and the WMSR set the restoration of former Chesapeake and Ohio (C&O) 2-6-6-2 No. 1309 as a higher priority. As of 2026, the WMSR is currently restoring No. 734 to operating condition.

== History ==
=== Design and revenue service ===
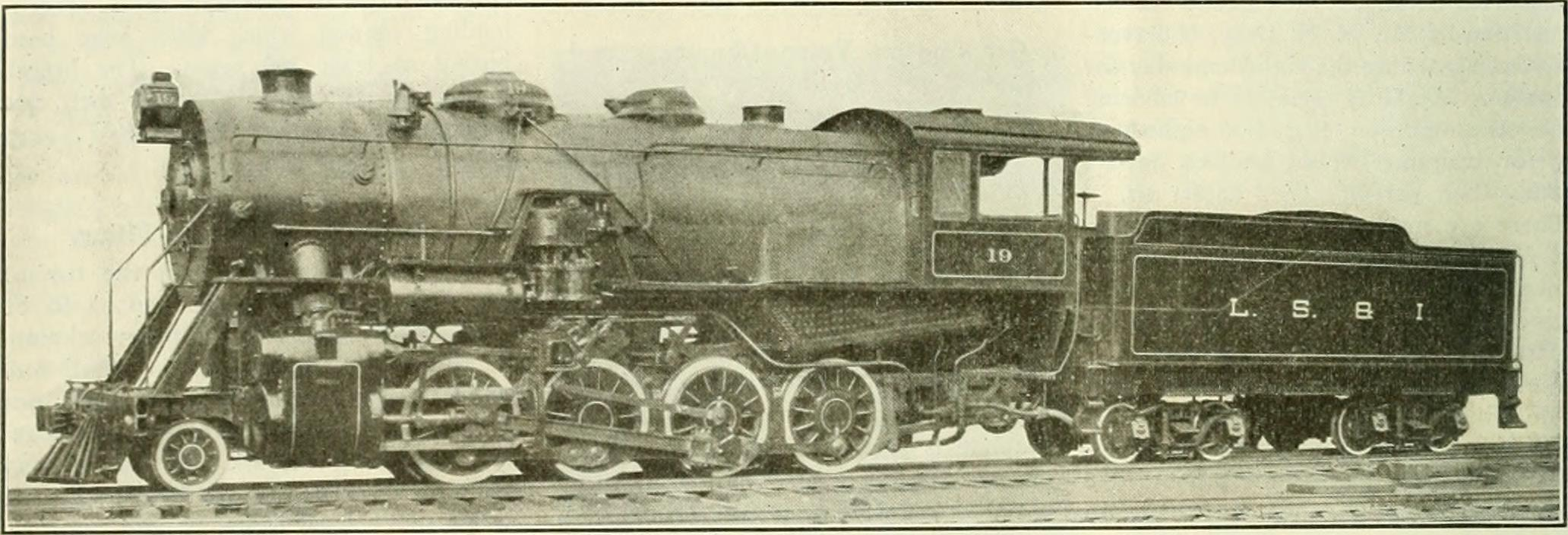
1916 Baldwin builder's photograph of sister SC-1 No. 35, originally numbered 19

No. 734—initially numbered 18—was one of three heavy 2-8-0 "Consolidation" types (Nos. 18–20) constructed in 1916 by the Baldwin Locomotive Works for the Upper Michigan-based Lake Superior and Ishpeming Railway (LS&I), and they were ordered in response to a surge in iron ore train traffic before and during World War I. Nos. 18–20 were classified as SC-1s, and they were designed with 26-by-30-inch (660 mm × 762 mm) cylinders and a working boiler pressure of 200 psi (1,379 kPa), and they were rated at a tractive effort of 55,900 pounds-force (249 kilonewtons), allowing them a maximum hauling capacity of 60 hopper cars. The SC-1s were among the largest and most powerful locomotives ever built with a 2-8-0 wheel arrangement, but more powerful 2-8-0s would be rostered by some Eastern-based coal-hauling railroads, such as the Reading Company, the Delaware and Hudson (D&H), and the Western Maryland (WM).

The SC-1s were also built with 88-inch (2,235 mm) diameter boilers, resulting in their domes being squat and bells being mounted aside from the top; it led to LS&I crews nicknaming them Hogs. The LS&I assigned the SC-1s to replace three slightly smaller B-4 class 2-8-0s—which had a maximum hauling capacity of 45 cars—in pulling strings of empty hopper cars up a 1.63%-grade to iron ore mines in Ishpeming and Negaunee. After being loaded with ore, the hoppers would be hauled down the grade and switched onto a large ore dock at Presque Isle, where the ore would be loaded into vessels for shipping across Lake Superior. No. 18 would also operate sparingly for other services in between ore-shipping seasons.

In 1924, the LS&I was reorganized after merging with the Munising, Marquette and Southeastern Railway (MM&SE), and all locomotives the railroad retained were renumbered. A fourth SC-1, No. 44, was obtained from the MM&SE, and all the SC-1s were renumbered as 30–33, with No. 18 being renumbered to 30. (Note: The No. 18 became assigned to a smaller SC-4 class 2-8-0.) The following year, in 1925, Nos. 30 and 31 were renumbered again as Nos. 34 and 35, when the LS&I purchased two additional 2-8-0s second-hand from the Chicago River and Indiana Railroad. Later in the 1920s, almost all the SC-1s were equipped with tender boosters to increase their tractive effort, but for unknown reasons, No. 34 never received one. Sometime during the 1930s, all the SC-1s were rebuilt to have their regular tractive effort boosted to 60,484 pounds-force (269 kilonewtons). By the end of the 1950s, with the LS&I gradually dieselizing their operations, the railroad diminished their usage of the SC-1s and left them in storage in Marquette, but No. 34, along with No. 32, remained on the railroad's roster as back-up power for diesels, until their retirement in 1961.

=== First retirement ===
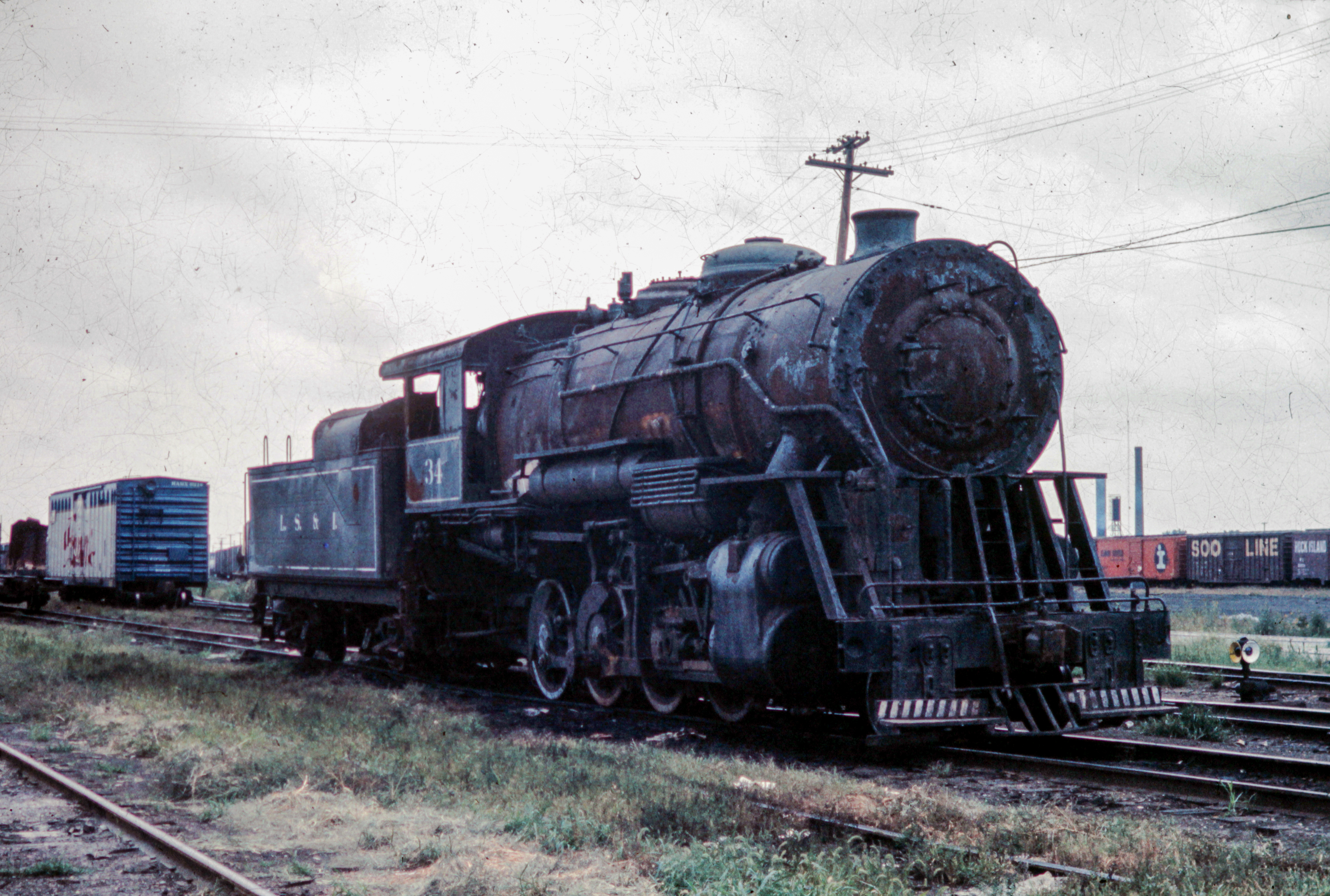
No. 34 stored in Melrose Park, Illinois, before its move to the Illinois Railway Museum in 1971

In July 1963, No. 34 was purchased by the then-new Marquette and Huron Mountain Railroad (M&HM). The M&HM had also purchased ten other 2-8-0s from the LS&I, including the rest of the SC-1s, but only three of them (SC-4s Nos. 19, 22, and 23) were used for their tourist and freight operations. The SC-1s were revealed to be too heavy to operate on the railroad's light-weight trackage, so they were left in storage near Marquette, and then they were gradually sold off while the M&HM reorganized their finances: No. 32 was sold in 1966 to the United States Air Force for use as a test target in Florida, and No. 33 was sold in 1968 to the original founders of the Hocking Valley Scenic Railway (HVSR).

In 1971, No. 34 was sold to the Illinois Railway Museum (IRM) of Union, Illinois, where it was subsequently put on display. In 1985, the IRM acquired booster-powered SC-1 No. 35, resulting in No. 34 being deemed surplus to the museum's collection. Sometime in 1990, the Pennsylvania-based Strasburg Rail Road considered acquiring No. 34 for use in pulling their tourist trains, but no negotiations were made. In 1991, No. 34 was traded to a private IRM member alongside a combine car, in exchange for Chesapeake and Ohio (C&O) No. 2707.

=== Western Maryland Scenic Railroad ===
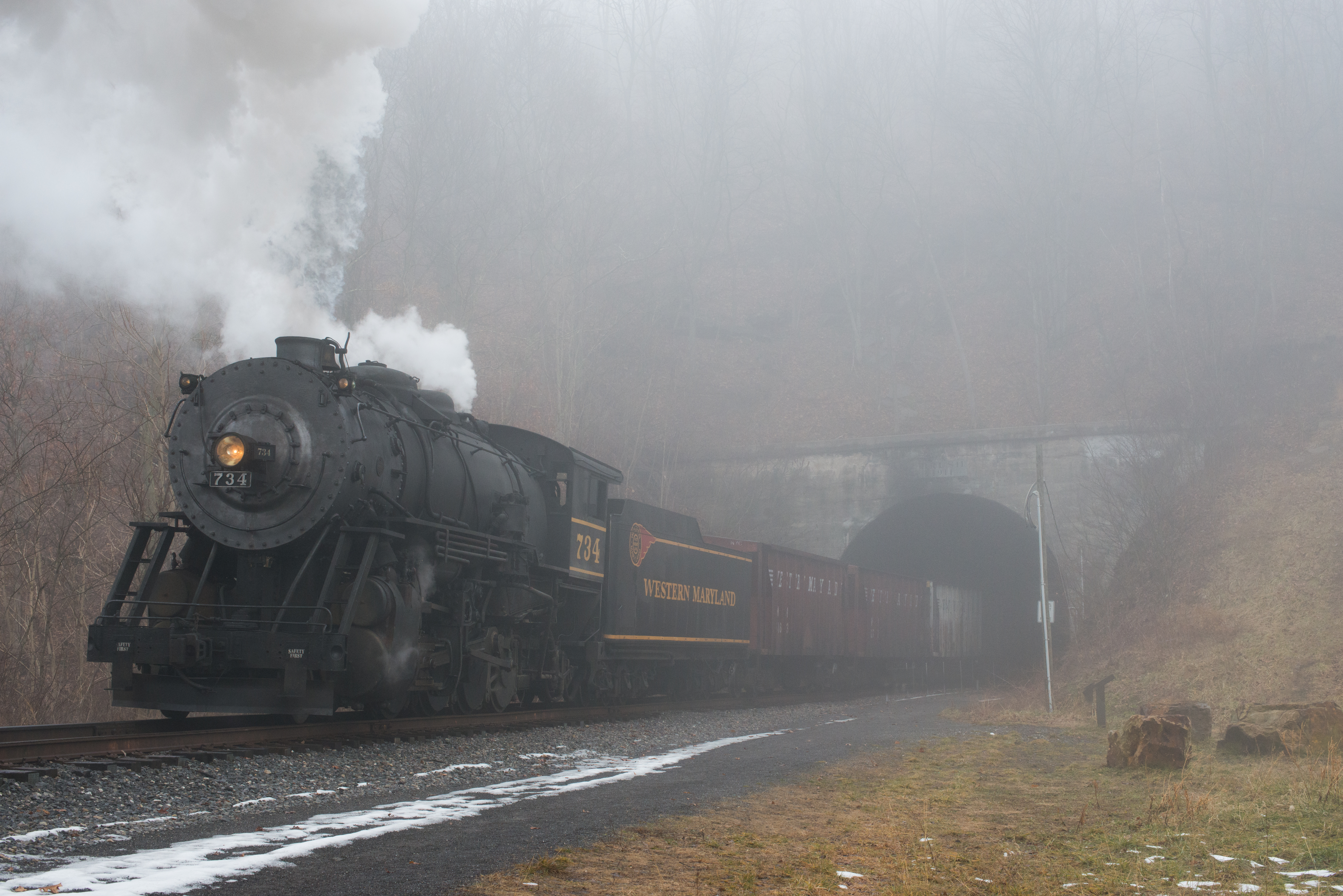
No. 734 hauling a photo freight train out of the WMSR's Brush Tunnel, on January 13, 2013

In 1988, the Scenic Railroad Development Corporation (SRDC) reopened the former Western Maryland mainline between Cumberland and Frostburg, Maryland, as a tourist excursion line called the Allegany Central Railroad, and entrepreneur Jack Showalter was contracted to operate the line for them, using steam locomotives Nos. 1238 and 1286. In 1991, following a falling out with Showalter, the SRDC was reorganized as the Western Maryland Scenic Railroad (WMSR) to operate the line with their own equipment and to control their own maintenance costs, and one of their main goals was to operate their own steam locomotive. Initially, the WMSR placed an open order to import a newly-built China Railways SY for cost-effective maintenance, and it was to be shipped alongside another SY for the New York, Susquehanna and Western Railway (NYS&W), with the latter covering the shipping costs.

In late 1991, the NYS&W cancelled their order as they purchased a domestic-based SY instead, and Allegany County commissioners persuaded the WMSR into following suit, believing an American-built locomotive would better suit them. The WMSR subsequently reached an agreement to purchase LS&I No. 34 in January 1992, and a preliminary inspection revealed most of the boiler to be in good condition, but with the firebox sheets requiring replacement. In honor of WM's original fleet of 2-8-0s, the SC-1 was repainted in a WM Fireball freight livery and renumbered as No. 734, and the locomotive was shipped with the livery from the IRM to Cumberland in July. (Note: The original WM No. 734 was an H-7A class, and it was built by ALCO with different specifications from that on LS&I No. 34.) The following month, No. 734 was moved inside the WMSR's former WM workshop in Ridgeley, West Virginia, where restoration work began under the leadership of their chief mechanical officer, Dan Pluta.

The railroad was unable to obtain any blueprints of the locomotive, and Pluta resorted to guiding the restoration based on his own knowledge. As the locomotive was disassembled, numerous mechanical problems were discovered and had to be addressed, and multiple parts had to be replaced with shop-fabricated duplicates, including a new Western Maryland style cab. Opting to make the SC-1 loosely resemble the WM's H series, crews also made multiple cosmetic alterations to No. 734, with the replacement cab sheets incorporating WM-style windows and removing the Worthington BL feedwater heater for a Westinghouse cross compound air pump. The railroad also acquired a CSX maintenance-of-way tender, which was formerly paired with a New York Central (NYC) L-1 4-8-2 "Mohawk", to replace the locomotive's original LS&I tender for increased coal and water capacity, and as a homage to the WM H-9s. The combined cost of acquiring and restoring No. 734 was reportedly $500,000. In July 1993, restoration work was completed, and No. 734 hauled its inaugural train on July 29.

During its time on the WMSR, No. 734 would become favored by tourists, railfans, retired WM steam crewmen, and historians favorably compared it to original WM H series locomotives. On July 20, 1997, No. 734 pulled ten CSX hopper cars for a WMSR photographer charter, which was organized by Carl Franz. The locomotive was subsequently used to pull freight trains for additional photo charters in the following years. In 1998, the locomotive was modified with a Chinese HT style coal stoker, allowing for easier labor for the firemen. Also in 1998, No. 734 was filmed for a television commercial that promoted the Pontiac Montana minivan. In the early 2000s, No. 734 would be taken out of service to undergo some major boiler tube replacements and other repairs then returning to service. In July 2003, during that year's National Railway Historical Society (NRHS) Convention, an Amtrak excursion ran from Baltimore to Cumberland, and passengers were transferred to the WMSR for a trip between Cumberland and Frostburg behind No. 734. In May 2011, Alex Trebek, the host of the quiz show Jeopardy!, visited the WMSR and served as No. 734's engineer, fulfilling his long-time wish of driving a locomotive, and his accompanying television crews filmed No. 734 for subsequent appearances in the show. In September 2013, No. 734 participated in an event that celebrated the 25th anniversary of the WMSR's operations, and tank locomotives Viscose Company No. 6 and Flagg Coal Company No. 75 were shipped to Cumberland for the occasion.

By that time, WMSR was pushed No. 734 beyond its current mechanical limits, as many critical components were mechanically worn out, including the running gear. As the locomotive continued to operate, its hauling capacity on the WMSR's steep grades was an estimated seven to eight loaded passenger cars. It was commonly accompanied by one of the railroad's GP30s for the heavier consists. With longer and heavier trains being required with minimal operating costs, the WMSR decided to acquire a larger steam locomotive to restore and operate, and it led to the acquisition of C&O mallet No. 1309 in May 2014. In February 2016, No. 734 took part in a final photo charter for Lerro Productions, before it had to be removed from service to undergo a federally mandated 1,472 service day inspection. The inspection was postponed while the WMSR focused on No. 1309's restoration, along with repairs to the railroad's line into Frostburg, which had been damaged by a landslide and would not reopen until 2017.

In April 2021, after No. 1309's restoration was completed, the WMSR announced that they would evaluate some options for No. 734. The railroad stated that No. 734 would require a lengthy and expensive mechanical work, due to its poor condition, and that it would be used for lighter off-season service and as back-up power for No. 1309. Crews simultaneously began to cosmetically stabilize the locomotive. In March 2022, the WMSR launched a fundraising campaign to perform a complete evaluation on No. 734 for the 1472 service day inspection work to eventually begin. In early 2025, the WMSR announced their partnership with PBS program Great Scenic Railway Journeys, which launched a matching grant campaign to raise $10,000 for No. 734's 1472 service day inspection. The railroad also began to prepare the locomotive for running gear evaluation and ultrasound mapping. Work officially began in February 2025, with the boiler flues, tubes, air pump, air reservoirs, check valve and sand dome being removed.

== See also ==
- Duluth and Northeastern 28
- Great Smoky Mountains Railroad 1702
- Southern Railway 630
- Southern Railway 722

== Bibliography ==
- Durocher, Aurele (April 1958). "The Lake Superior and Ishpeming Railroad Company". The Railway and Locomotive Historical Society Bulletin (98): 7–31. JSTOR 43520202.
- Schauer, David (2015). Lake Superior & Ishpeming Railroad In Color. Vol. 1. Scotch Plains, New Jersey: Morning Sun Books, Inc. ISBN 978-1-58248-494-5.
- Kraemer, Thomas (2011). Western Maryland Scenic Railroad (3rd ed.). Cumberland, Maryland: RR Trax Studios. ISBN 978-0-9743060-0-1.
