= Canadian Pacific 972 =

Preserved CP D-10j class 4-6-0 locomotive

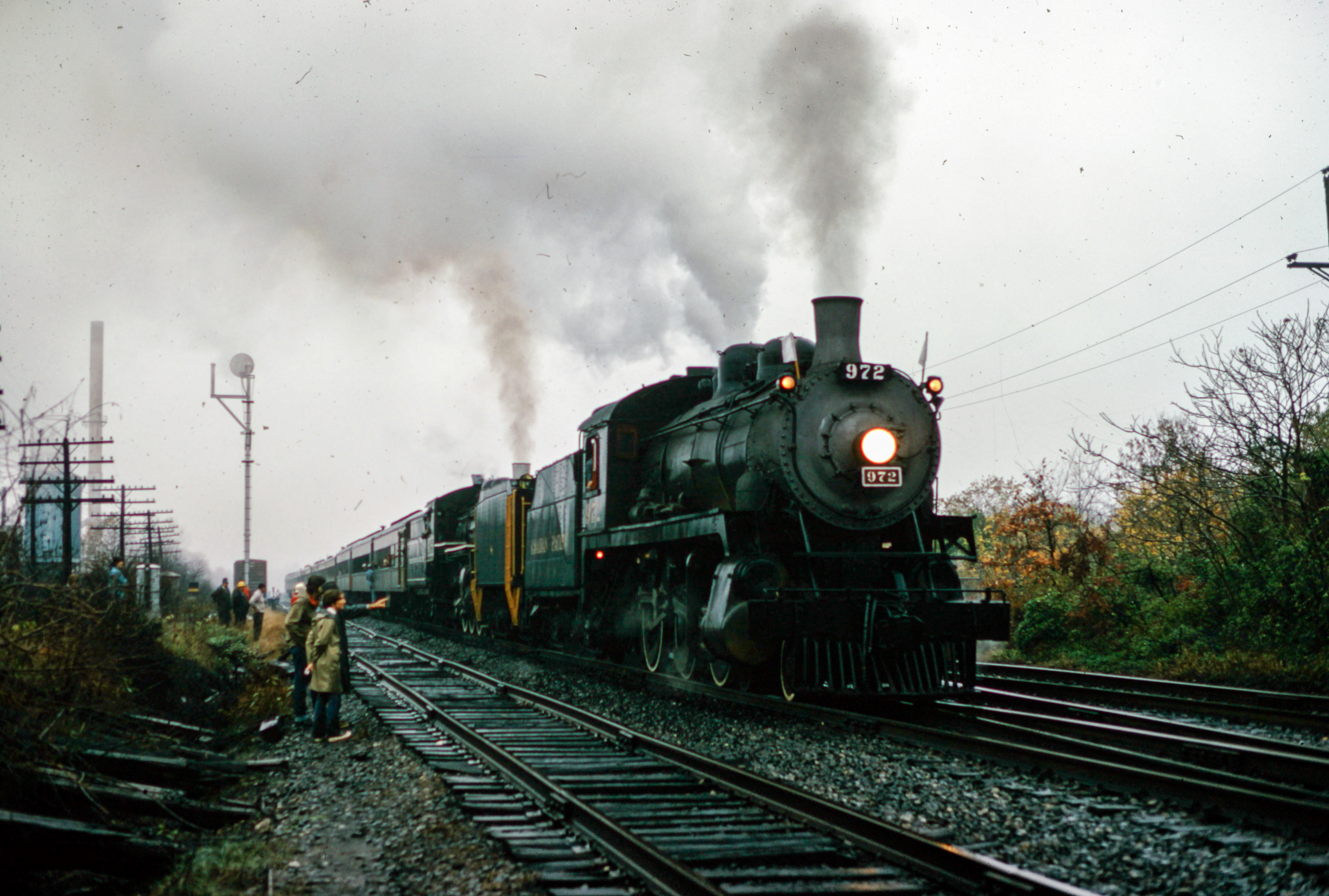
- No. 972 leading a doubleheader excursion with Florida East Coast (FEC) No. 148 on the Lehigh Valley (LV) mainline, October 25, 1975
Type and origin
- Power type: Steam
- Builder: Montreal Locomotive Works
- Serial number: 51106
- Build date: September 1912
Specifications
- Configuration
  - Whyte: 4-6-0
  - UIC: 2'C h2
- Gauge: 4 ft 8 1/2 in (1,435 mm)
- Driver dia.: 63 in (1,600 mm)
- Wheelbase: 56.37 ft (17.18 m)
  - Engine: 26.08 ft (7.95 m)
  - Drivers: 14.83 ft (4.52 m)
- Adhesive weight: 156,000 lb (71,000 kg)
- Loco weight: 205,000 lb (93,000 kg)
- Tender weight: 149,000 lb (68,000 kg)
- Total weight: 354,000 lb (161,000 kg)
- Fuel type: Coal
- Fuel capacity: 12 t (12 long tons; 13 short tons)
- Water cap.: 6,000 US gal (23,000 L; 5,000 imp gal)
- Firebox
  - Grate area: 49 sq ft (4.6 m^{2})
- Boiler pressure: 200 psi (1,400 kPa)
- Heating surface
  - Firebox: 209 sq ft (19.4 m^{2})
- Cylinders: Two, outside
- Cylinder size: 21 in × 28 in (530 mm × 710 mm)
- Valve gear: Walschaerts
- Valve type: Piston valves
- Loco brake: Air
- Train brakes: Air
- Couplers: Knuckle
Performance figures
- Tractive effort: 33,320 lb (15,110 kg)
- Factor of adh.: 4.68
Career
- Operators: Canadian Pacific Railway; Rail Tours Inc.
- Class: D-10j
- Number in class: 11 of 25
- Numbers: CPR 972; P&R 972; CV 972
- Retired: 1959 (revenue service); 1985 (excursion service)
- Restored: 1966
- Current owner: Strasburg Rail Road
- Disposition: Stored, awaiting possible restoration

Canadian Pacific 972 is a preserved D-10j class 4-6-0 "Ten-Wheeler" type steam locomotive built in September 1912 by the Montreal Locomotive Works (MLW). It was used for pulling branchline and mainline freight trains for the Canadian Pacific Railway (CP), until it was removed from service in 1959. It eventually became famous for pulling multiple mainline excursion trains throughout the state of Pennsylvania under the ownership of George Hart. It was sold to the Strasburg Rail Road (SRC) in 1995, who had an initial plan to rebuild it to pull their own tourist trains. As of 2026, No. 972 is stored outdoors and disassembled in the Strasburg Rail Road's yard.

== History ==
=== Revenue service ===
In the early 20th Century, the Canadian Pacific Railway (CPR) purchased several classes of 4-6-0 "Ten-wheelers" for their locomotive fleet. No. 972 was the eleventh member of the D-10j class, which consisted of twenty-five locomotives constructed in 1912 by the Montreal Locomotive Works in Montreal, Quebec, and they were numbered 962–986. The CPR assigned No. 972 to pull short-distance freight trains over their light-weight branchlines. During selective years, the locomotive would also pull short freight trains on the CPR's mainline throughout Saskatchewan. By the late 1950s, few of the aging 4-6-0s were still in service for the CPR. No. 972 was retired from revenue service by the end of 1959, and it was subsequently stored in front of the Weston shops with several other steam locomotives in the form of a scrap line.

=== Rail Tours ===
In early 1966, No. 972 became the last steam locomotive to be sold by the CPR. Steam locomotive historian and former Reading Company employee George M. Hart purchased it with the hopes of using it to pull his own mainline excursion trains under his private company Rail Tours Incorporated. The locomotive was moved to York, Pennsylvania to be refurbished, and later that same year, it was brought back under steam, and it began pulling excursion trains over the Maryland and Pennsylvania Railroad (MPA) between York and Delta. On some occasions in 1966 and 1967, the locomotive assisted CPR 4-6-2 No. 1286, another locomotive formerly operated by Hart, on a series of roundtrip excursion runs on the Western Maryland (WM) mainline between York, Williamsport, Hagerstown, and Cumberland.

In 1967, Hart moved most of his equipment, including No. 972, to Jim Thorpe, and he reached an agreement with the city of Jim Thorpe to operate excursion trains there. No. 972 subsequently began pulling trains over the Central Railroad of New Jersey's (CNJ) Nesquehoning Valley branch, as well as on the Lehigh Valley's (LV) mainline from Jim Thorpe to White Haven and return, and several other trains that took place in the state of Pennsylvania. In 1971, No. 972 visited the Strasburg Rail Road in Strasburg to promote the future opening of the Railroad Museum of Pennsylvania. On October 25, 1975, No. 972 led a double-headed excursion train in front of Ex-Florida East Coast 4-6-2 No. 148 from Bethlehem to South Plainfield, New Jersey. That trip was a "Farewell to the Lehigh Valley" trip, since the LV was to be merged into Conrail the following year. However, that trip was also plagued by the poor condition of the trackage they rode on, and rain was downpouring across the states of Pennsylvania and New Jersey that day.

No. 972 subsequently returned to Jim Thorpe to continue pulling excursion trains throughout Carbon County. The locomotive returned to the Strasburg Rail Road to pull a tourist train for the National Railway Historical Society (NRHS) in March 1979. In October 1983, during the 150th anniversary of the founding of the Reading Company, No. 972 was relettered to 'Philadelphia and Reading', and it was selected to pull an excursion train in commemoration of the occasion, since none of the preserved Reading steam locomotives were available at the time. In 1985, No. 972 was relettered again to 'Cumberland Valley' to pull commemorative trains for the 150th anniversary of the founding of the Cumberland Valley Railroad (CV). By the end of that year, however, the locomotive was removed from excursion service, since Hart's contract with the city of Jim Thorpe expired. While making negotiations with the city to renew his contract, Hart moved No. 972 back to Strasburg for a heavy rebuild.

=== Disposition ===
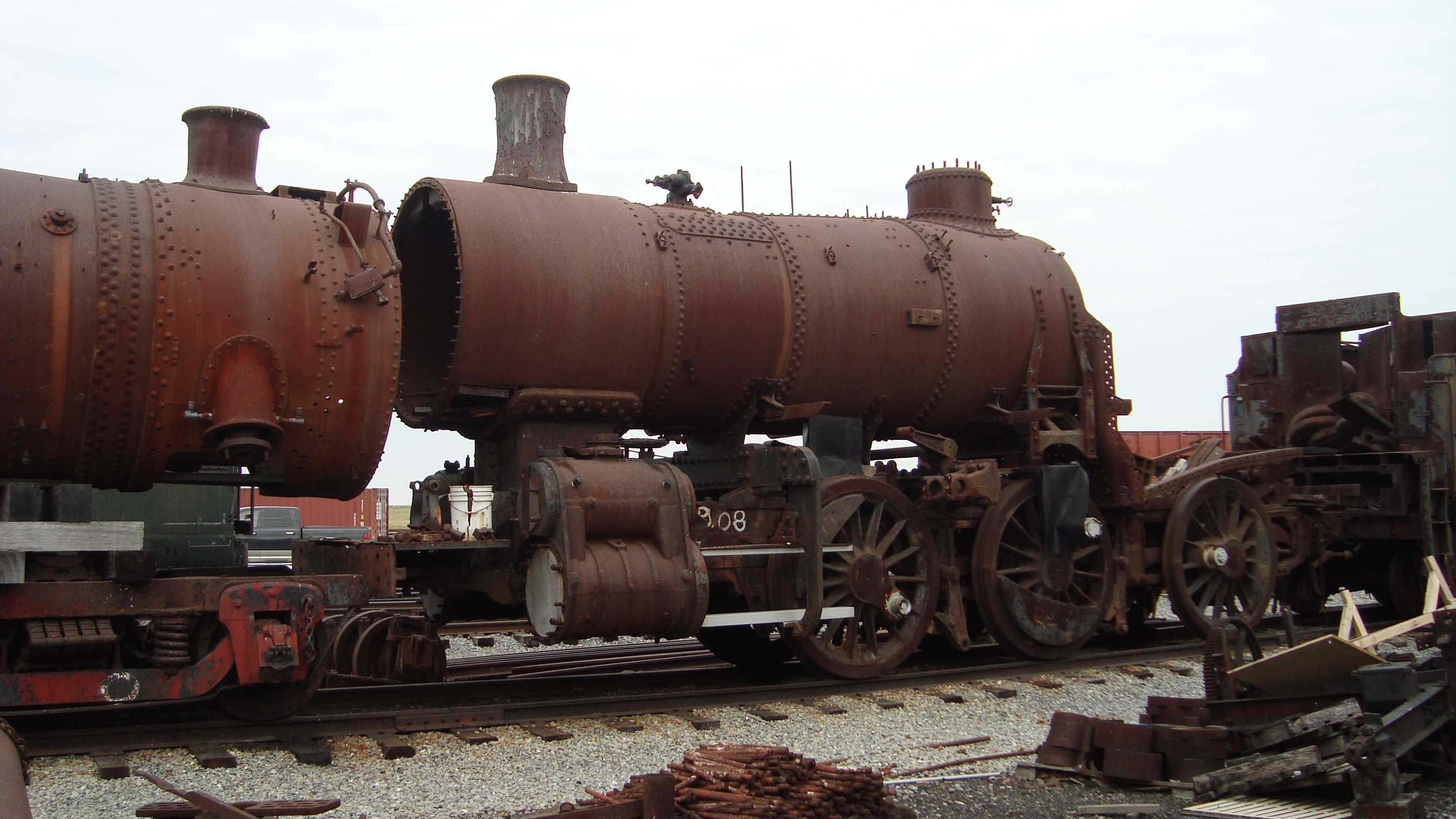
No. 972 sitting disassembled at the Strasburg Rail Road yard, on December 1, 2013

By the mid-1990s, Hart had run out of funds for the rebuild, and the locomotive was sold to the Strasburg Rail Road in 1995, in lieu of payment for the work already completed. With the locomotive now under their possession, the Strasburg Rail Road made plans to finish the overhaul, which included replacing its firebox. As time progressed, the Strasburg Rail Road to shelved the overhaul, as they concentrated their resources and efforts on operating their other steam locomotives. As of 2026, No. 972 is stored outdoors in the Strasburg Rail Road's yard with its cab, firebox, pilot truck, cowcatcher, smokebox door, and several other critical components detached. There are no plans in the foreseeable future to restore the locomotive to service. However, the railroad has stated that they haven't considered selling or donating the engine and that they still intended to possibly restore it someday.

== See also ==
- Canadian Pacific 1238
- Canadian Pacific 1286
- Canadian Pacific 1293
- Reading 1251
- Reading Blue Mountain and Northern Railroad 425

== Bibliography ==
- Paulus, Brian (2017). The Western Maryland Railway: Baltimore to Cumberland & the New Line. AuthorHouse. ISBN 978-1-5246-5118-3.
