= Western Maryland Scenic Railroad =

Heritage railroad based in Cumberland, Maryland, United States

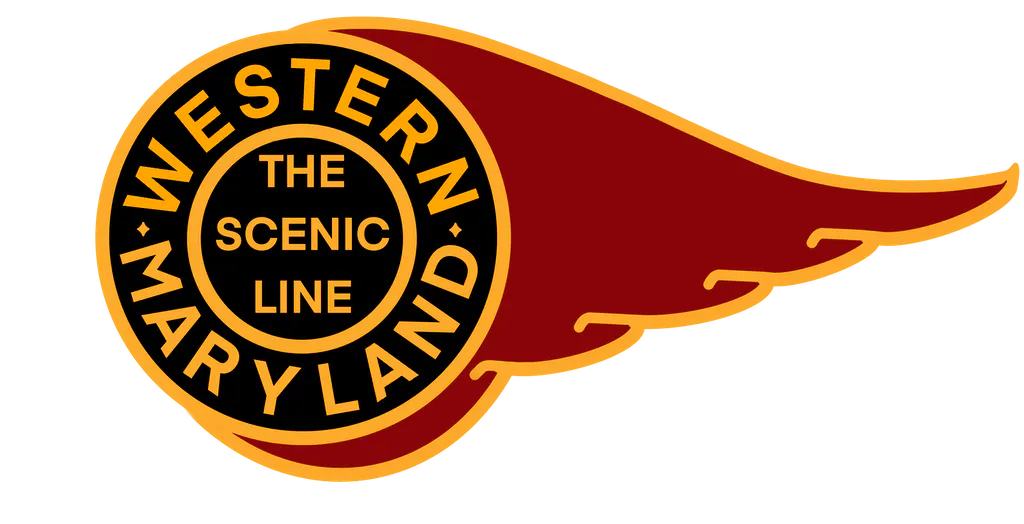

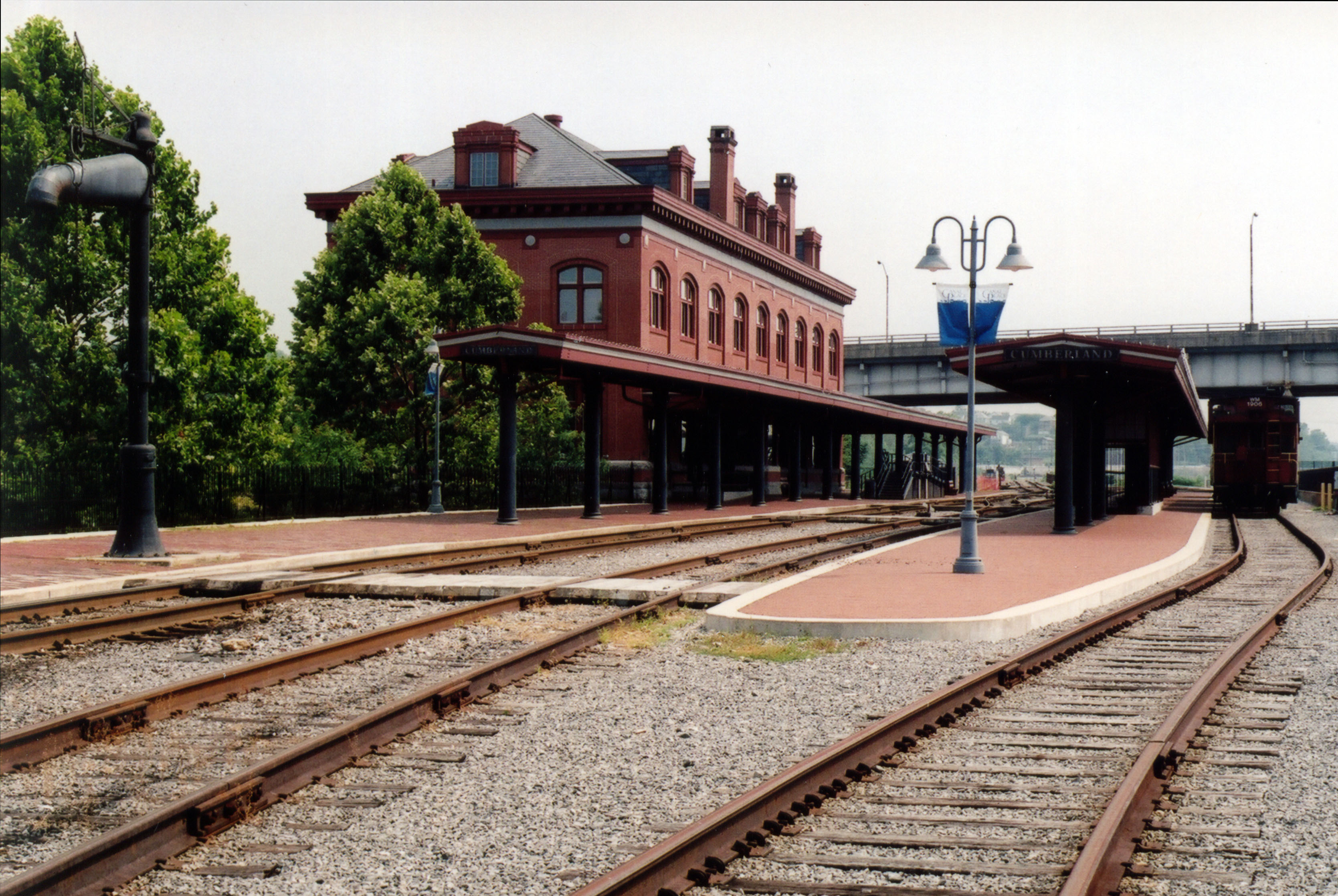
- The WMSR Cumberland station in 2003

Overview
- Headquarters: Cumberland, Maryland
- Reporting mark: WMSR
- Locale: Allegany County, Maryland
- Dates of operation: 1988–present
- Predecessor: Western Maryland Railway, Allegany Central Railroad

Technical
- Track gauge: 4 ft 8 1/2 in (1,435 mm) standard gauge
- Length: 16 mi (26 km)

Other
- Website: wmsr.com

The Western Maryland Scenic Railroad (reporting mark WMSR) is a heritage railroad based in Cumberland, Maryland, that operates passenger excursion trains and occasional freight trains using both steam and diesel locomotives over ex-Western Maryland Railway (WM) tracks between Cumberland and Frostburg. The railroad offers coach and first class service, murder mystery excursions, and special seasonal trips.

== Rail line history and description ==
The Western Maryland (WM) was a small Class 1 railroad that served Cumberland, Maryland, along with a branch line that ran between there and Frostburg, as well as stretching to other small towns, like Hancock and Connellsville. In 1973, the WM joined the Baltimore and Ohio and Chesapeake and Ohio railroads to group into the Chessie System, which would eventually be completely merged into the new CSX transportation system. The Cumberland-Frostburg branch was subsequently abandoned. In the late 1980s, the city of Cumberland started seeing the old branch line as a possible tourist attraction, so a joint effort was formed; Allegany County contributed $585,000, the city $2,470,560, and the city of Frostburg $338,427 to purchase the corridor. As part of the deal, the newly formed Scenic Railroad Development Corporation (SRDC) was given the old WM shops in Ridgeley, West Virginia, a 1913 station in Cumberland, and an 1891 Cumberland & Pennsylvania wooden depot in Frostburg. From 1988 to 1991, the Allegany Central Railroad was contracted to operate excursions on the line with contracted to operate the line for them, using steam locomotives Nos. 1238 and 1286, before the SRDC began operations themselves as the WMSR.

In 1991, following a falling out with Showalter, the SRDC was reorganized as the Western Maryland Scenic Railroad (WMSR) to operate the line with their own equipment and to control their own maintenance costs, and one of their main goals was to operate their own steam locomotive.

The railroad originally placed an open order to import a newly-built China Railways SY for cost-effective maintenance, and it was to be shipped alongside another SY for the New York, Susquehanna and Western Railway (NYS&W), with the latter covering the shipping costs, however, the Allegany County commissioners persuaded the WMSR that an American-built locomotive would be a better suit for them.

In January 1992, the WMSR purchased LS&I No. 34 from the Illinois Railway Museum (IRM) and returned it to operating condition in July 1993.

WMSR's excursion trains start in Cumberland at the Western Maryland Railway Station. Built in 1913, the station also houses one of the six Chesapeake and Ohio Canal National Historical Park visitor centers as well as other attractions and offices. From there, the trains follow the former Western Maryland Railway line northwest through the Cumberland Narrows, a deep water gap formed by the passage of Wills Creek between Haystack Mountain and Wills Mountain, parts of the Wills Mountain Anticline geological structure. They then proceed up the Allegheny Front through a water gap formed by Jennings Run, pass Mt. Savage, and terminate at the former Cumberland and Pennsylvania Railroad depot in Frostburg, where they lay over for about 90 minutes to allow passengers to visit the town while the locomotive is reversed on a turntable that originally served the Western Maryland in Elkins, West Virginia. The train then returns to Cumberland by the same route.

Intermediate sights on the line include:

- Helmstetter's Curve in Cash Valley 39°40′43″N 78°48′25″W
- Brush Tunnel 39°41′24″N 78°48′50″W
- Woodcock Hollow, site of a hairpin curve 39°41′00″N 78°51′26″W

The Allegheny Highlands Trail of Maryland, part of the Great Allegheny Passage bicycle trail between Cumberland and Pittsburgh, Pennsylvania, parallels the WMSR. Cyclists can make reservations with the railroad to put their bikes on board for the climb up the mountain to Frostburg, then cycle back down to Cumberland.

On August 24, 2021, the railroad appointed a new executive director, Wesley Heinz. Heinz came into the position with a mission to rebuild and reimagine the entire organization. The new administration implemented a plan that resulted in the completion of locomotive No. 1309's restoration, and experienced an increase of ridership and revenue.

In January 2024, the WMSR announced their long-term lease of the Georges Creek Railway—a 14-mile (23 km) short line that lies between Carlos and Westernport, Maryland—from the Eighteen Thirty Group. The WMSR’s initial goal for the railway is to thoroughly revitalize the trackage and to eventually operate the short line as a separate business entity called the Georges Creek Division, and the line would provide tourist excursions matching the WMSR’s main operations while providing occasional revenue freight trains that would interchange with CSX. The railroad also acquired former WM EMD GP9 locomotives Nos. 25 and 39 for the eventual operation.

== Shops ==
The WMSR operates out of the former WM's Ridgeley, West Virginia, car shops located just across the Potomac River from Cumberland. The shops include offices, a Federal Railroad Administration building, and the former paint shop which is now used to house the steam engine and perform repairs on the railroad's equipment. The WMSR shops also serve as a business offering restoration services for locomotives and coaches from both commercial and private owners. South, past the Ridgely shops and yard, the WMSR maintains a wye (original part of Maryland Jct) that is used to turn the railroad's locomotives and coaches.

== Passenger and freight equipment ==
Since its creation, the WMSR has gained an extensive collection of lightweight style passenger coaches, many of which it either has restored to service in its green and gold livery, or has used for parts to restore other coaches. Many of the restored coaches are painted with the names of local area towns, as well as benefactors of the scenic railroad. The WMSR also has a collection of freight equipment it has collected from CSX and other sources that it uses for storage at the shops, rail line maintenance, and photo freight excursions. The WMSR currently also has three cabooses. They are two ex-C&O cabooses and one ex-WM caboose. Other un-restored equipment includes an ex-Chessie System crane, ex-Amtrak material handling cars, heavyweight coaches and pieces for a turntable.

== Equipment ==
=== Locomotives ===
Locomotive details
Number	Image	Type	Model	Built	Builder	Status
734		Steam	2-8-0	1916	Baldwin Locomotive Works	Under restoration
1309		Steam	2-6-6-2	1949	Baldwin Locomotive Works	Operational
111		Diesel	SW7	1949	Electro-Motive Diesel	Operational
25		Diesel	GP9	1954	Electro-Motive Diesel	Stored, awaiting restoration
39		Diesel	GP9	1957	Electro-Motive Diesel	Stored, awaiting restoration
501		Diesel	GP30	1963	Electro-Motive Diesel	Operational
502		Diesel	GP30	1962	Electro-Motive Diesel	Stored, used for parts
539	A GE B32-8 in the Western Maryland "Fireball" livery and the number 539 sits idle on the woods-lined tracks leading into Frostburg, MD.	Diesel	B32-8	1989	General Electric	Operational
558		Diesel	B32-8	1990	General Electric	Operational
561		Diesel	B32-8	1990	General Electric	Operational
7496		Diesel	SD40	1968	Electro-Motive Division	Awaiting restoration

=== Former/Leased units ===
Locomotive details
Number	Image	Type	Model	Built	Builder	Current owner
450		Diesel	F40M-2F	1981	Electro-Motive Diesel	LTEX
1238		Steam	4-6-2	1946	Montreal Locomotive Works	Waterloo Central Railway
1286		Steam	4-6-2	1948	Canadian Locomotive Company	Private owner in Manitoba
40		Diesel	GP9	1955	Electro-Motive Diesel	Durbin and Greenbrier Valley Railroad
199		Diesel	RS3	1954	American Locomotive Company	Railroad Museum of New England
1689		Diesel	RSD5	1955	American Locomotive Company	Illinois Railway Museum
305		Diesel	FPA-4	1959	Montreal Locomotive Works	Cuyahoga Valley Scenic Railroad
306/800		Diesel	FPS-4	1959	Montreal Locomotive Works	Cuyahoga Valley Scenic Railroad
7471		Diesel	SD40	1966	Electro-Motive Diesel	Precision Locomotive Leasing
7436		Diesel	SD35	1964	Electro-Motive Diesel	Precision Locomotive Leasing
7		Diesel	CR4 60-ton switcher	1960	Plymouth Locomotive Works	Walkersville Southern Railroad

=== Rolling stock ===
Rolling stock details
Number / Name	Type	Built	Builder
456	Dining car	1948	New York Central
851	Lounge car	1949	Pullman Company
501	Dome car	1951	Pullman Company
905 (Silver Springs)	Business car	1925	Pullman Company
Good Vibrations	Passenger car	1955	Pullman Company
Lover's Leap	Observation car	1949	Unknown
7000	Astra Dome	1955	American Car and Foundry Company

== Gallery ==
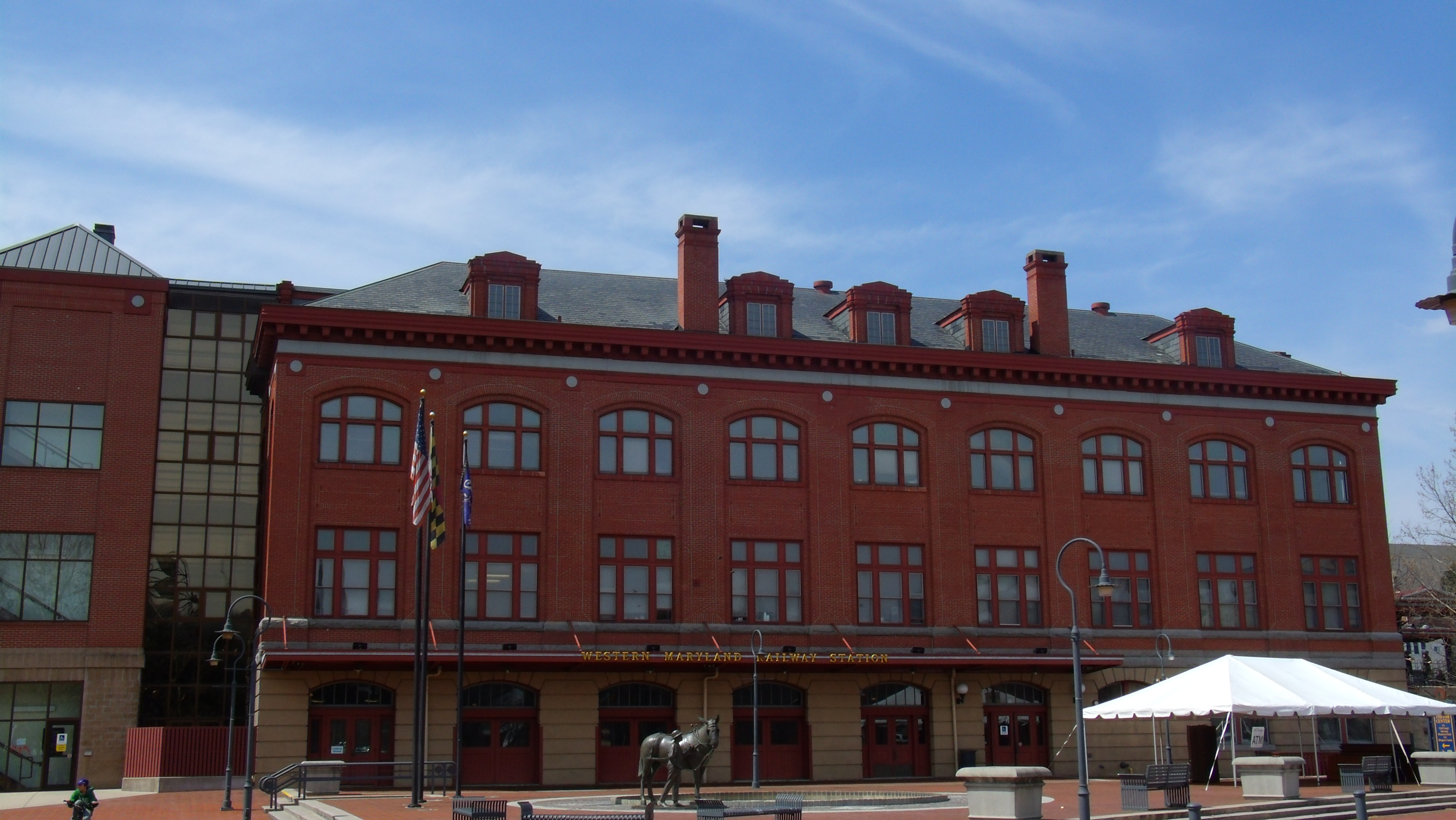
The first WMSR Station is located at 13 Canal Street in Cumberland, Maryland

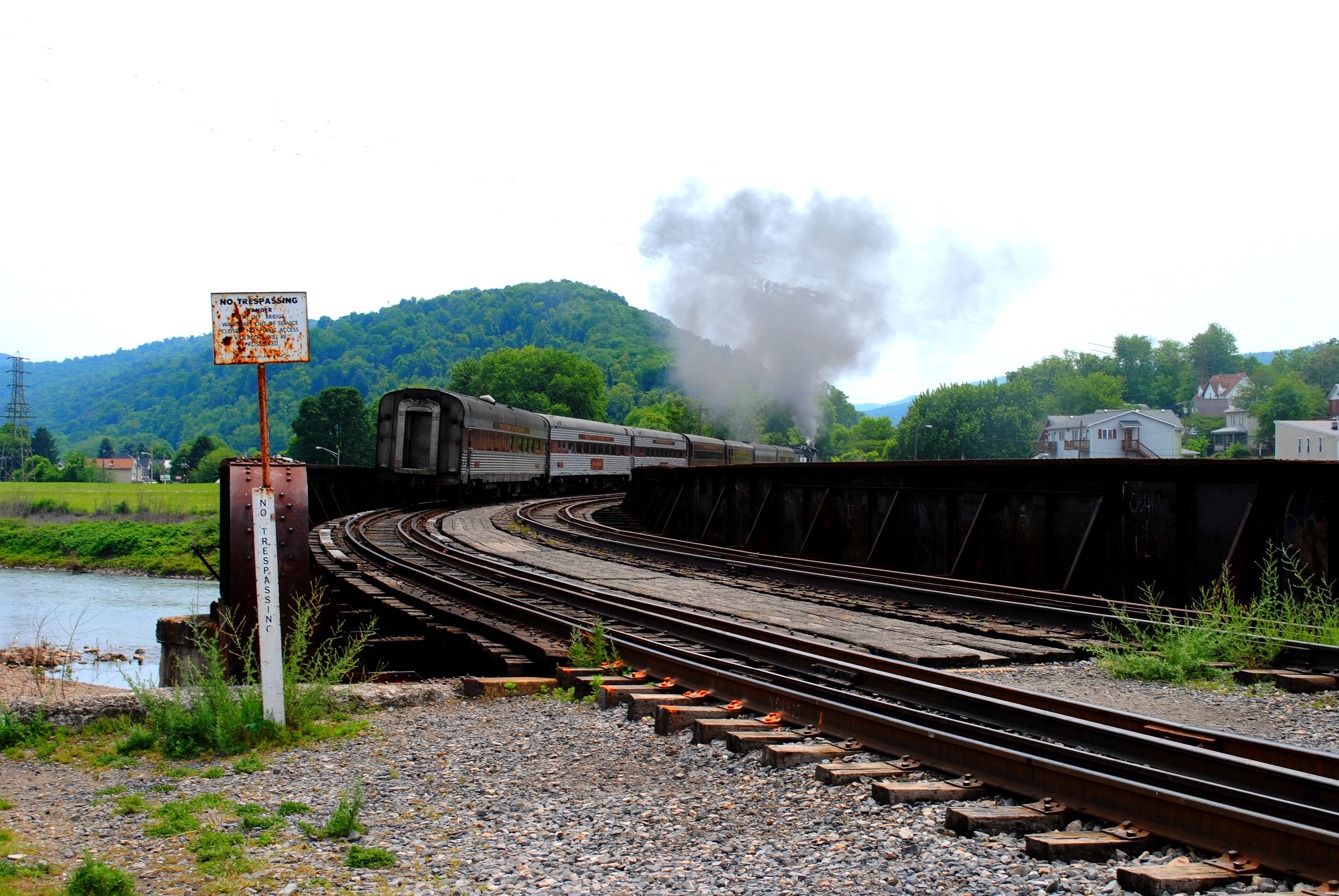
WMSR Nos. 501 and 734 crossing the Potomac River from Cumberland to Ridgeley

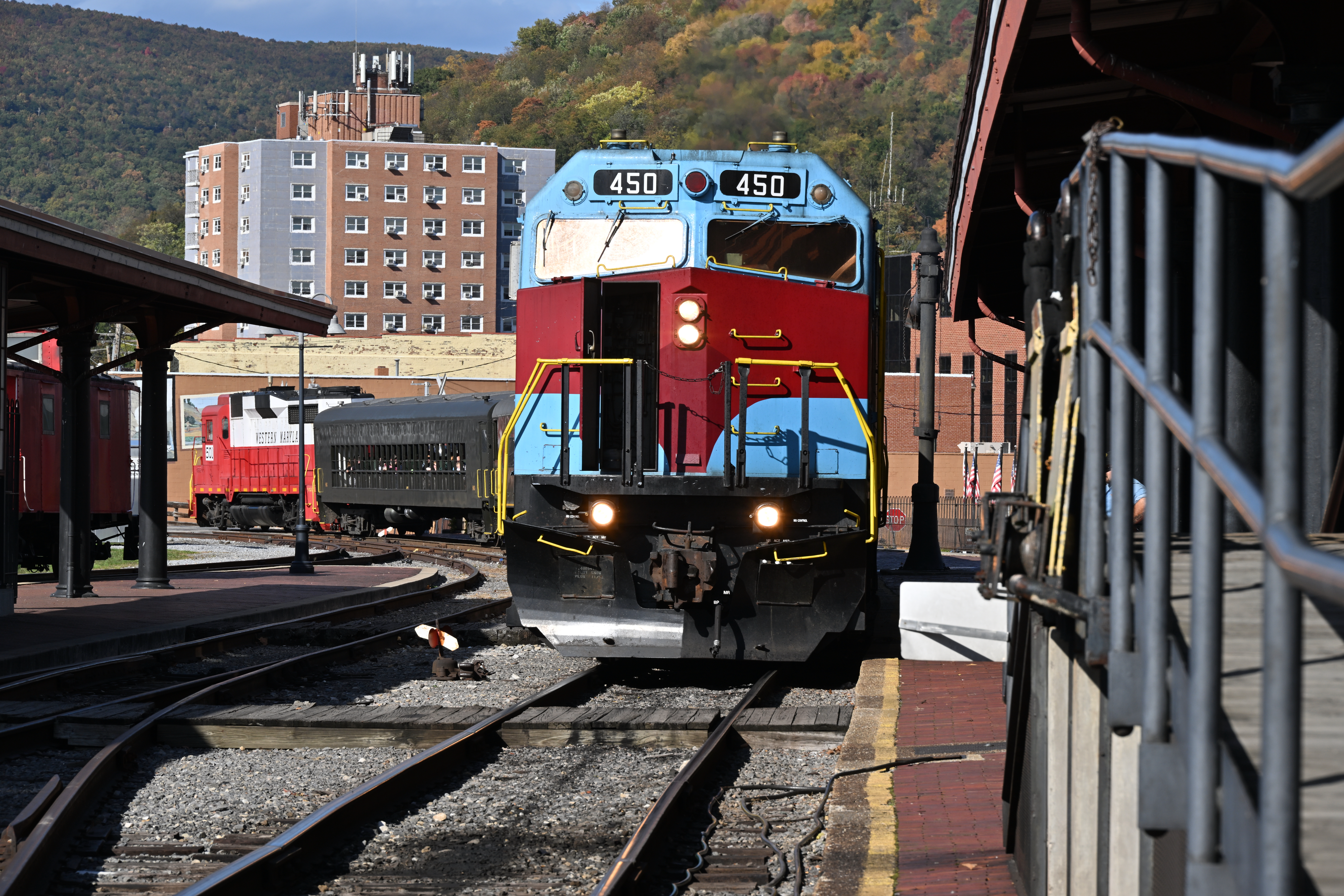
WMSR No. 450 at the WMSR station in Cumberland

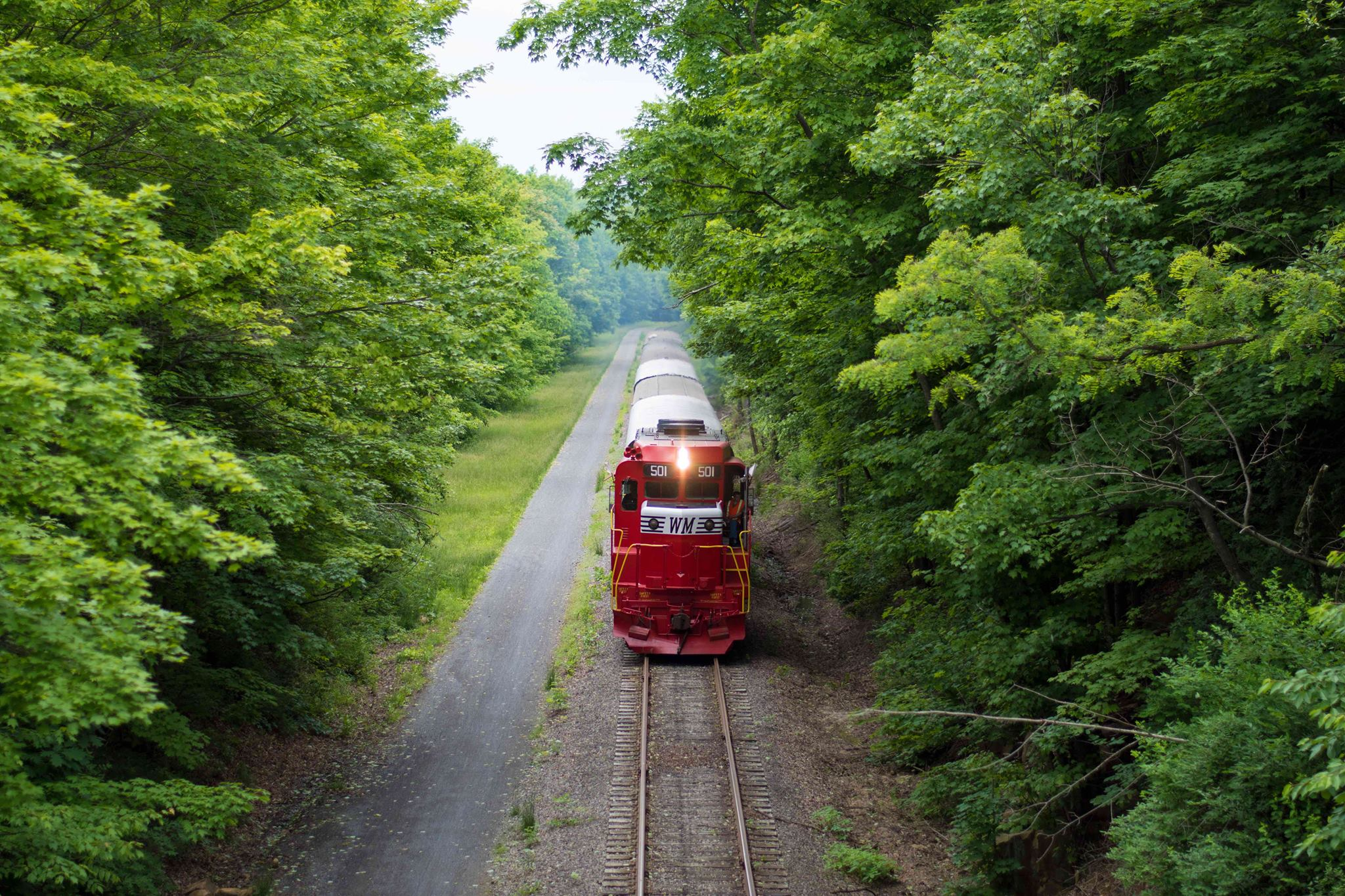
A WMSR excursion traveling below Parkersburg Bridge

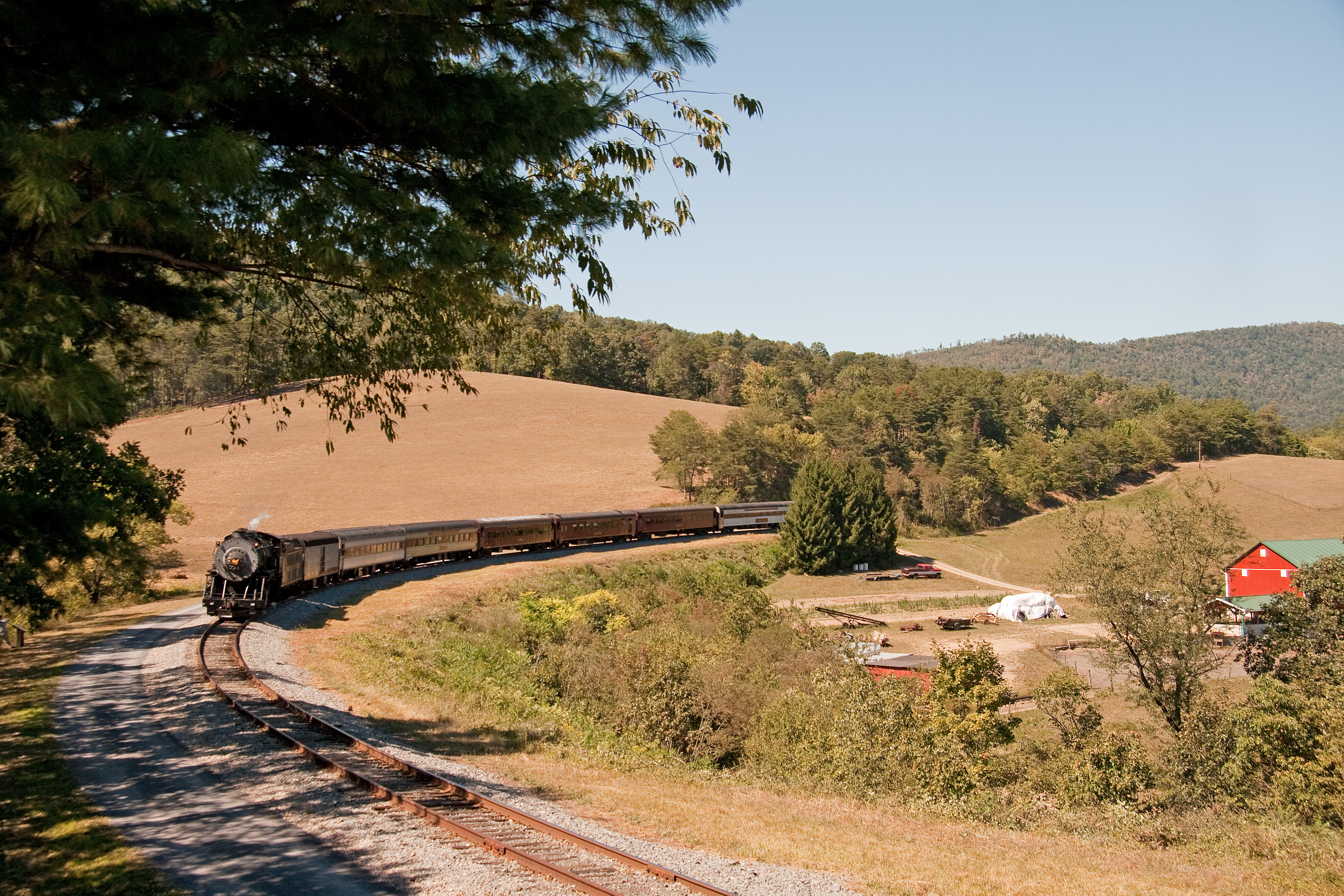
2-8-0 No. 734 crossing Helmerstetter's Curve

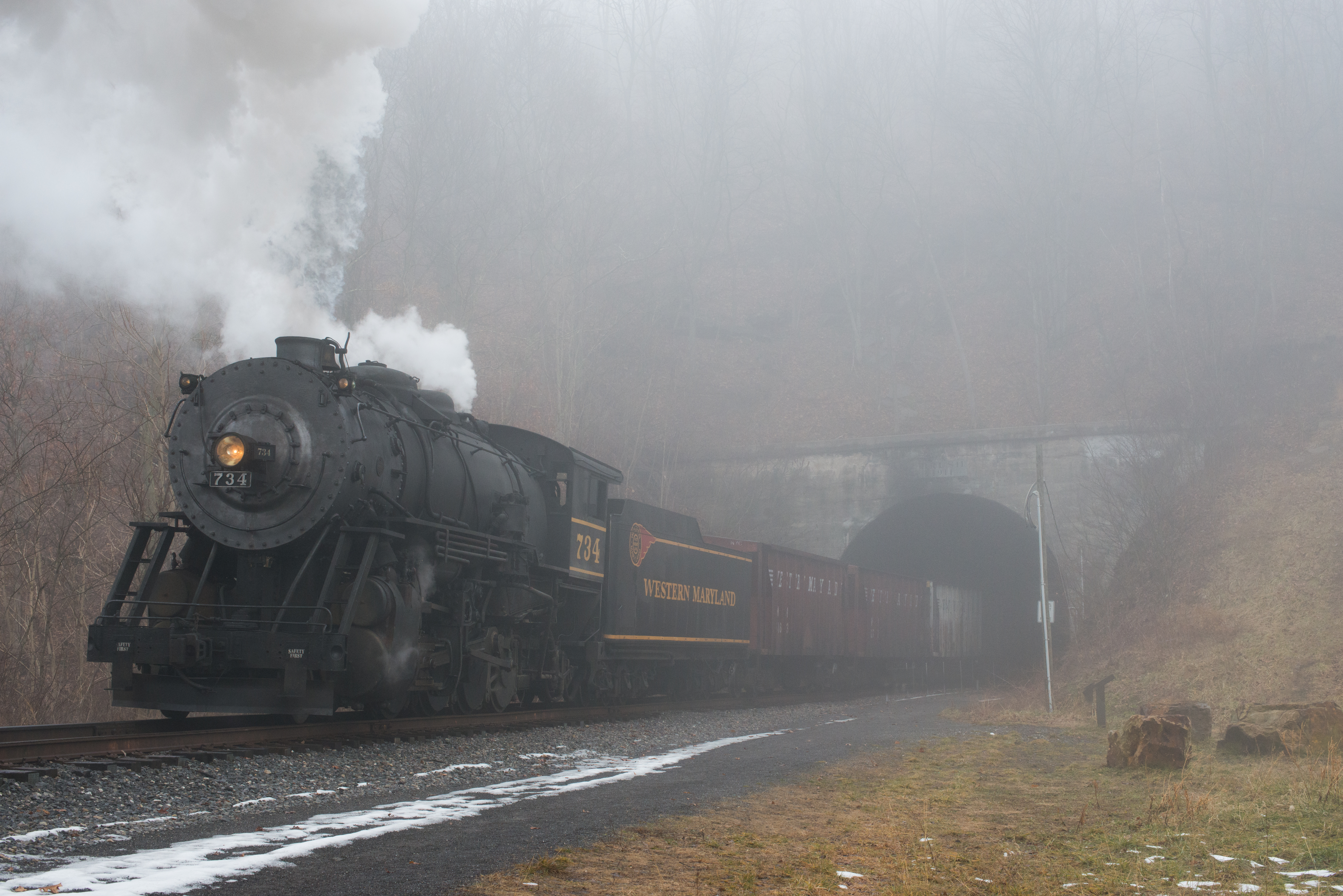
2-8-0 No. 734 with a photographer freight train at Brush Tunnel

No. 501 going through Brush Tunnel

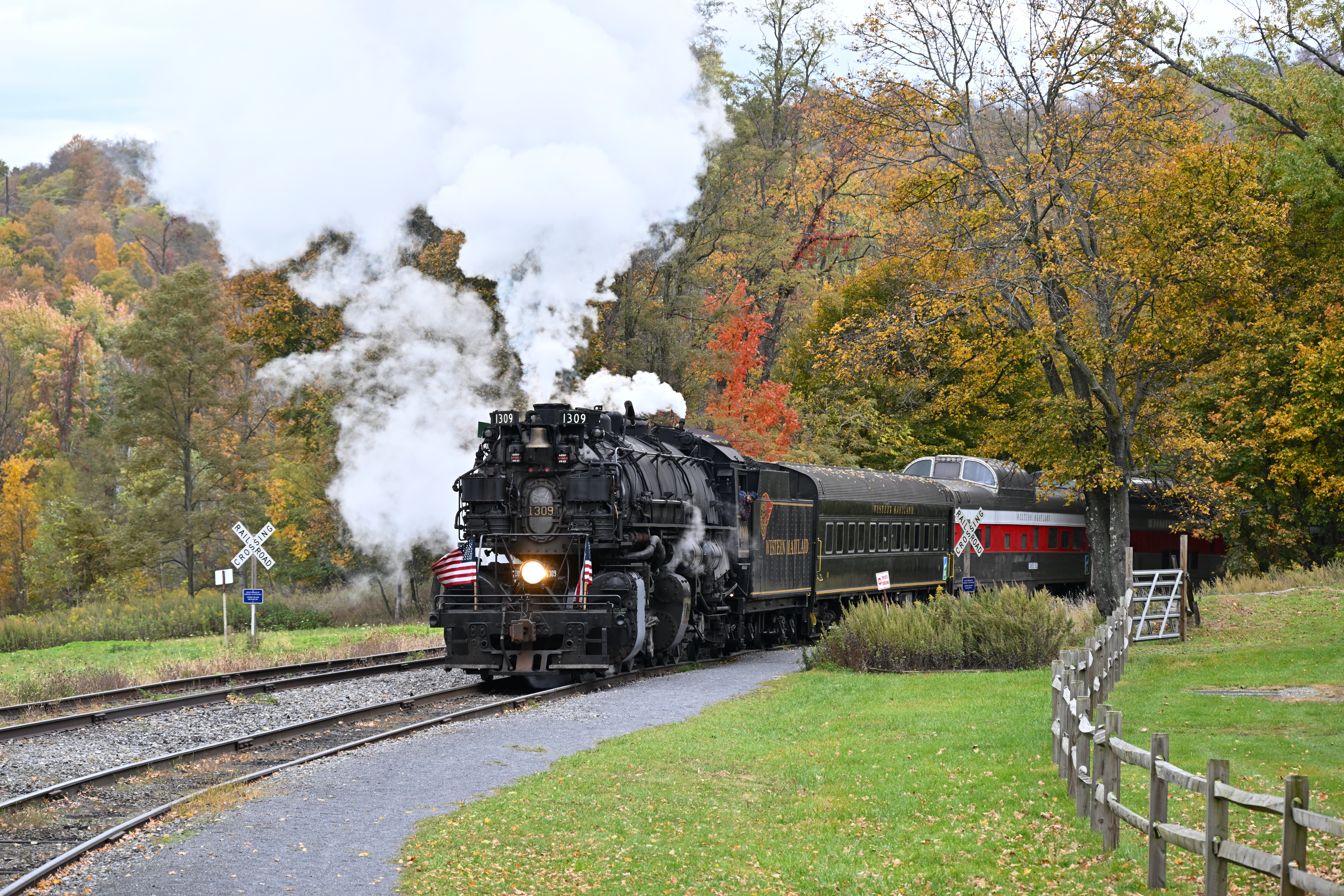
2-6-6-2 No. 1309 pulling an excursion into Frostburg

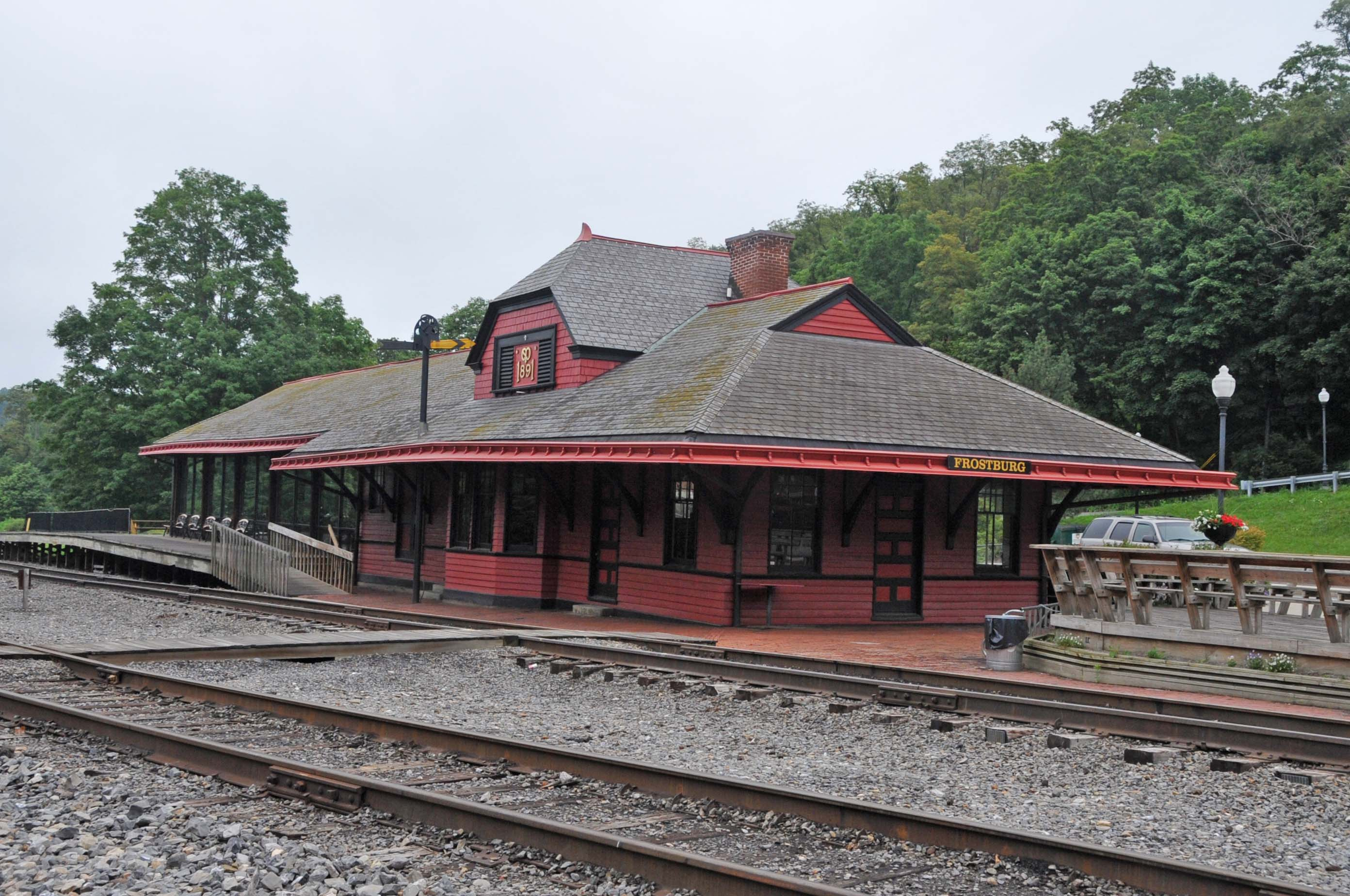
The second WMSR Station is at 18 Depot Road in Frostburg, Maryland

== See also ==
- Canal Place (park complex which includes the railway station)
- List of heritage railroads in the United States
