= Brush Tunnel =

Railroad tunnel near Corriganville, Maryland, US

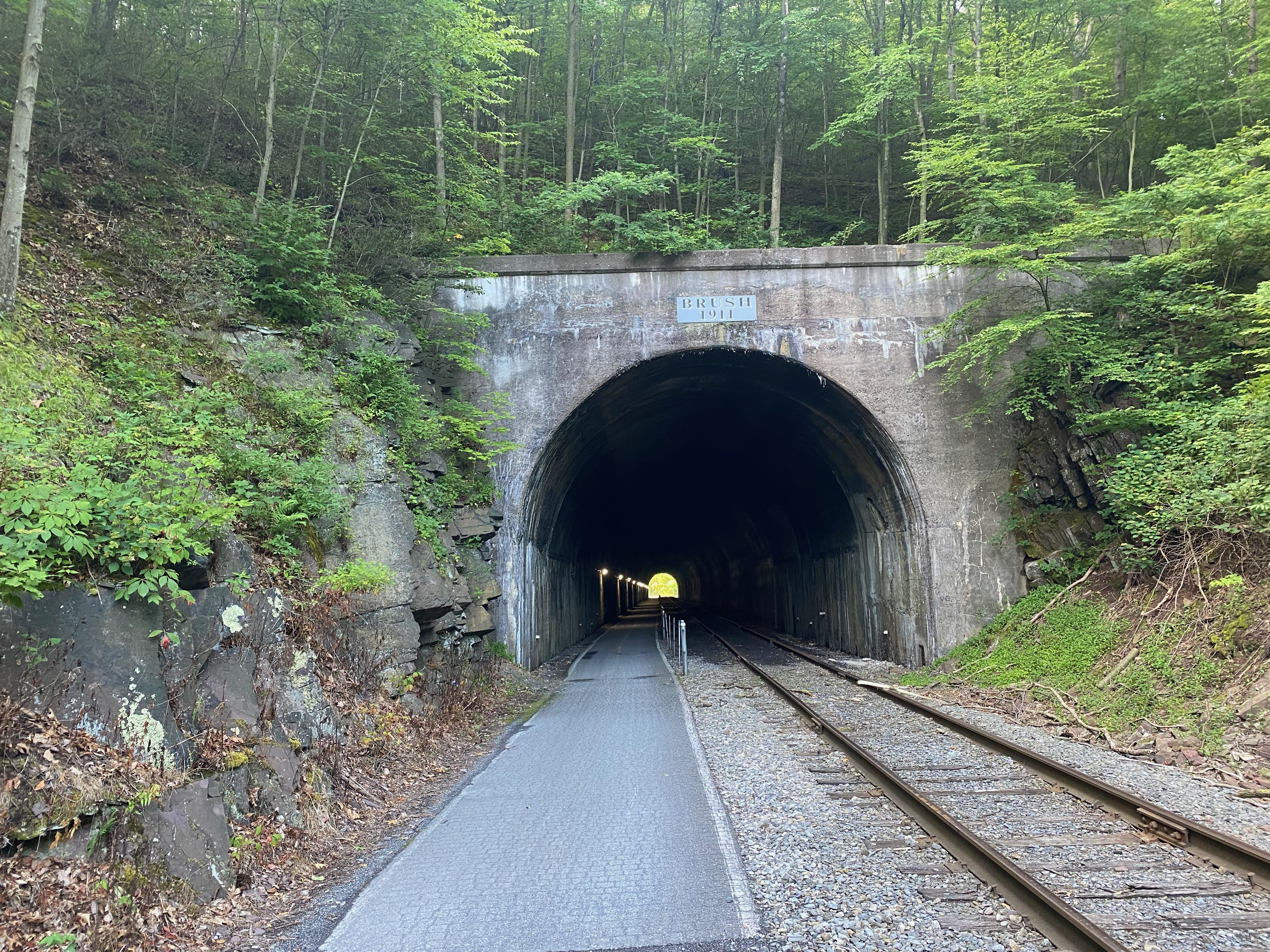
- Interactive map of Brush Tunnel

Overview
- Location: Corriganville, Maryland
- Coordinates: 39°41′24″N 78°48′50″W
- Status: Shared use by rail trail and scenic railroad
- System: Western Maryland Scenic Railroad

Operation
- Opened: 1911

Technical
- Length: 914 ft (279 m)
- No. of tracks: Single (originally Double)
- Track gauge: 4 ft 8 1/2 in (1,435 mm) standard gauge
- Max elevation: 1,062 ft (324 m)
- Grade: 1.75%

The Brush Tunnel is a 914-foot (279 m) railroad tunnel located about 1 mile (1.6 km) west of Corriganville, Maryland.

It was built in 1911 by the Western Maryland Railway, and is currently used by the Western Maryland Scenic Railroad, a tourist railroad running between Frostburg and Cumberland, Maryland, as well as the Great Allegheny Passage formerly known as the Allegheny Highlands Trail of Maryland rail trail).

The Allegheny Highlands Trail of Maryland is currently complete from Cumberland to near Pittsburgh, Pennsylvania, using mostly abandoned rail right-of-way. The portion of the trail from Cumberland to near Frostburg trail is adjacent to the active tourist line, including the tunnel.

As the tunnel was bored for two tracks, and the scenic railroad uses only one, there is sufficient room for the bicycle trail alongside in the tunnel, which is now lighted. (However, trail users are cautioned not to be in the tunnel when a train is in or approaching the tunnel.)
