= Allegheny Highlands Trail of Maryland =

Walking trail in Maryland, United States

Coordinates: 39°41′44″N 78°50′47.5″W

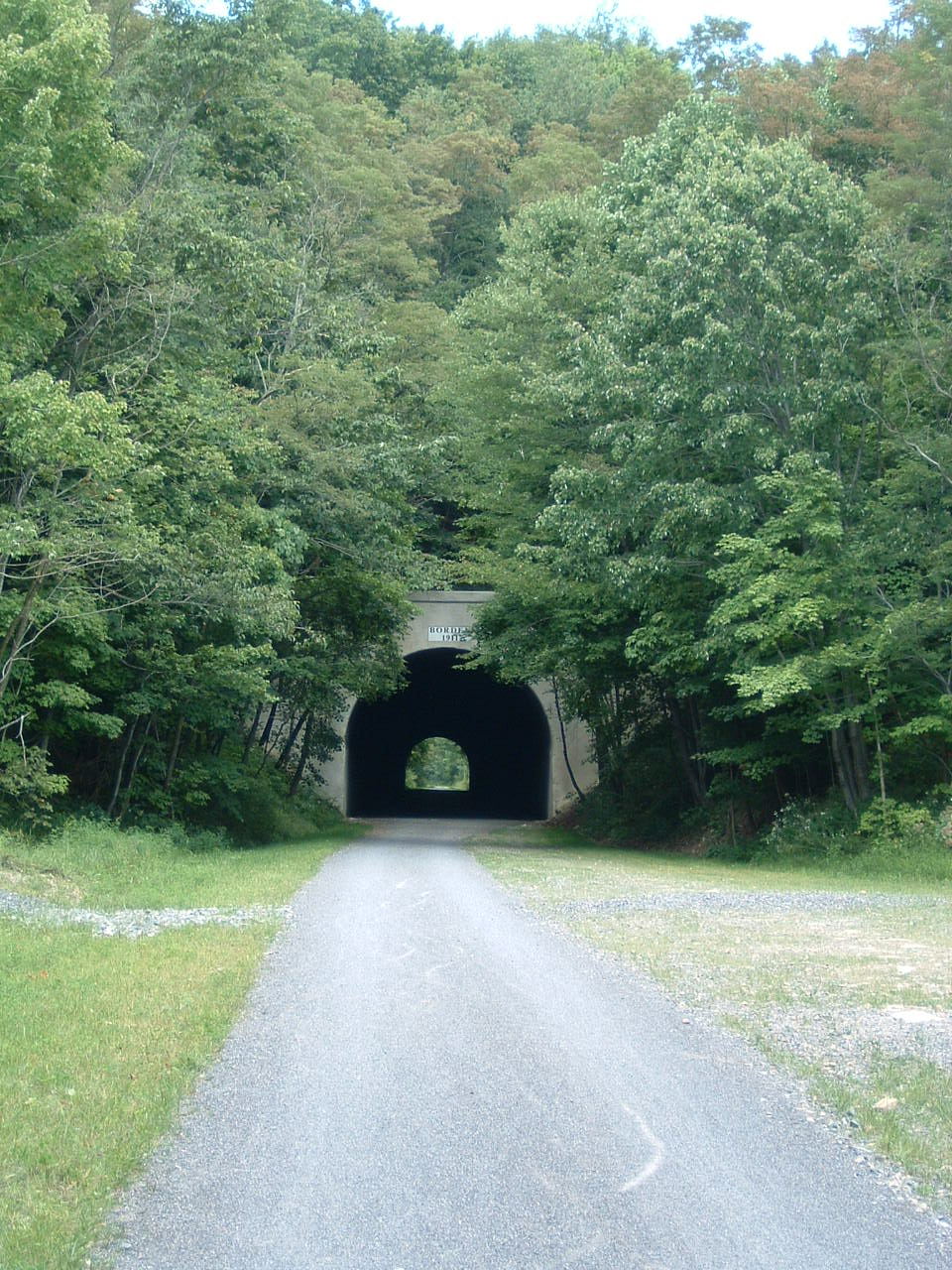
The Borden Tunnel on the AHTM

The Allegheny Highlands Trail of Maryland (AHTM) is a 20.47-mile (32.94 km) long rail trail between the C&O Canal in Cumberland and the Mason–Dixon line, where it meets the Allegheny Highlands Trail of Pennsylvania. It forms part of the Pittsburgh–Washington, DC Great Allegheny Passage.

The trail follows the route of the Connellsville extension of the Western Maryland Railway. Track still parallels the trail between Cumberland and Frostburg; it is used by the Western Maryland Scenic Railroad.

== See also ==
- Allegheny Trail, West Virginia
