= Reading 1251 =

Preserved RDG B-4a class 0-6-0ST locomotive

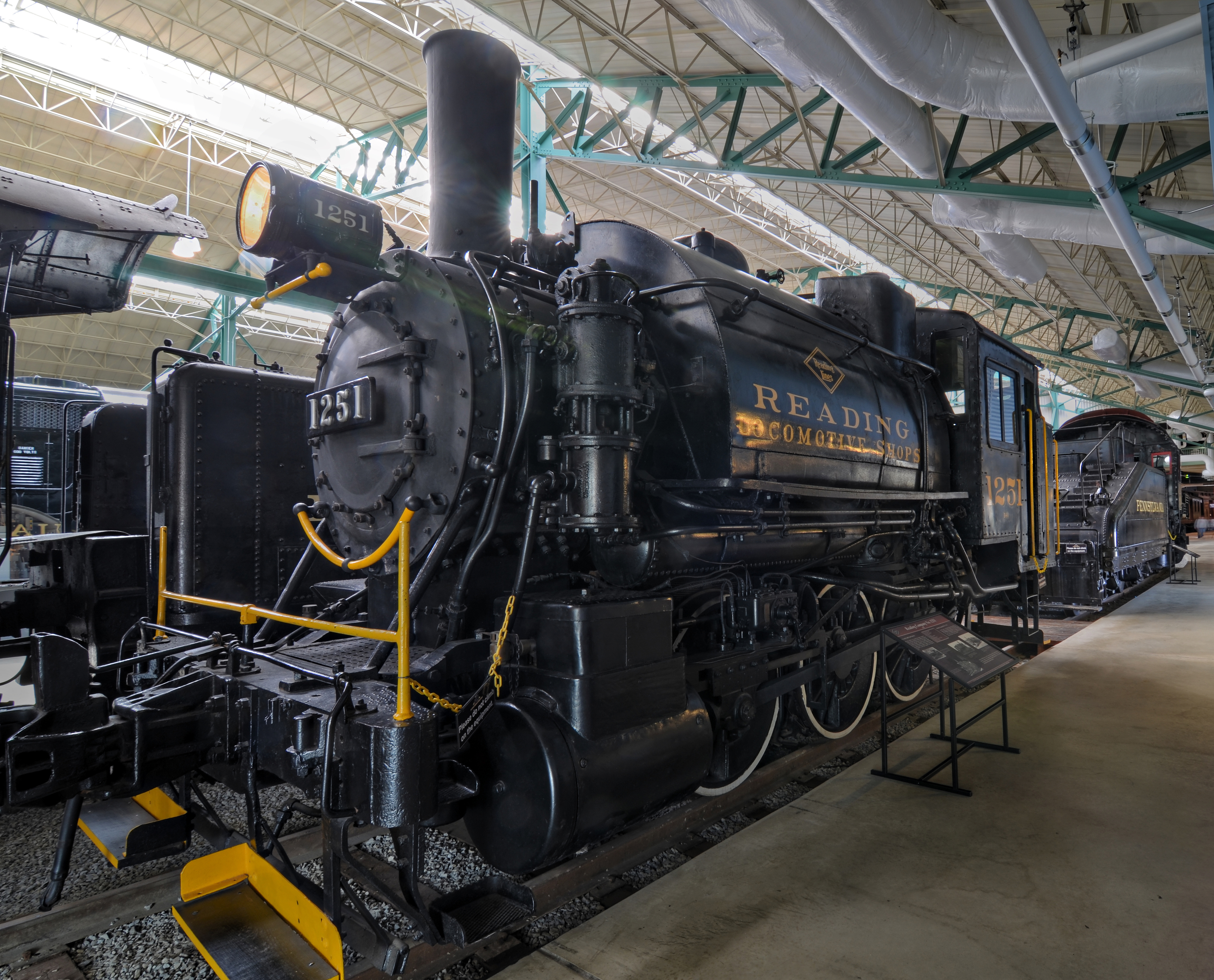
- No. 1251 on static display at the Railroad Museum of Pennsylvania in 2016
Type and origin
- Power type: Steam
- Builder: Reading Company
- Serial number: 2306
- Build date: September 1918
Specifications
- Configuration
  - Whyte: 0-6-0ST
  - UIC: C
- Gauge: 4 ft 8 1/2 in (1,435 mm)
- Driver dia.: 50 in (1,300 mm)
- Length: 28 ft (8.5 m)
- Adhesive weight: 120,000 lb (54,000 kg)
- Loco weight: 120,000 lb (54,000 kg)
- Fuel type: anthracite coal
- Fuel capacity: 2 t (2.0 long tons; 2.2 short tons)
- Water cap.: 1,100 US gal (4,200 L; 920 imp gal)
- Firebox
  - Grate area: 40.1 sq ft (3.73 m^{2})
- Boiler pressure: 150 psi (1,000 kPa)
- Cylinders: Two, outside
- Cylinder size: 20 in × 24 in (510 mm × 610 mm)
- Valve gear: Stephenson valve gear
Performance figures
- Tractive effort: 24,500 lb (11,100 kg)
- Factor of adh.: 4.9
Career
- Operators: Reading Company; Rail Tours Inc.
- Class: B-4a
- Retired: February 8, 1963 (revenue service); October 1966 (excursion service)
- Restored: April 1964 (1st excursion service); 1982 (cosmetically)
- Current owner: Railroad Museum of Pennsylvania
- Disposition: On static display

Reading 1251 is a preserved B-4a class 0-6-0ST "Switcher" type Steam locomotive built by the Reading Company's own locomotive shops in Reading in 1918 as the only tank locomotive to be rostered by the Reading after World War I. It served as a shop switcher to pull and push locomotives in and out of the Reading's shops, until it was taken off of the Reading's active list in early 1963. It subsequently spent the next eight years being sold to various owners until becoming fully owned by the Railroad Museum of Pennsylvania in Strasburg for static display. As of 2026, the locomotive remains on indoor display inside the museum.

== History ==
=== Original service ===
During World War I, the Reading Company constructed various designs of switcher locomotives from their own shops in Reading, Pennsylvania to serve their various rail yards and roundhouses across their system. In September 1918, a unique saddle tank locomotive rolled out of the Reading shops after being constructed from parts of an I-2a class 2-8-0. The locomotive was B-4a No. 1251, which ended up being the only tank locomotive to be rostered by the Reading after the end of the war. The locomotive was never meant to haul trains as it was a shop switcher, or 'goat' as they were often nicknamed, to tow locomotives in and out of the Reading's locomotive facility.

Multiple brand new locomotives were still being manufactured at Reading and others were continuously in need of repairs, so No. 1251 was kept busy shunting them throughout the shop. It was consistently cleaned and well-maintained, and its ease of operation made it well liked by crews. As the 1950s progressed the Reading was in the process of dieselizing their locomotive fleet, although No. 1251 remained on the active list the longest, the only thing forcing it into retirement was age. Its last revenue switching assignment occurred on February 8, 1963.

=== Preservation ===
George M. Hart was a steam locomotive historian who formerly worked with Reading Company for years. As the famed Iron Horse Rambles excursion trains were coming to an end, Hart decided to operate his own steam excursions in various parts of the Northeastern United States, and he founded his own private company Rail Tours Incorporated. In early 1964, Hart purchased No. 1251 from the Reading and after some repair work was completed, No. 1251 was put into excursion service over the Maryland and Pennsylvania Railroad in York County. Owing to its low fuel capacity, No. 1251 was also fitted with an ex-Reading tender to decrease the amount of stops it would require.

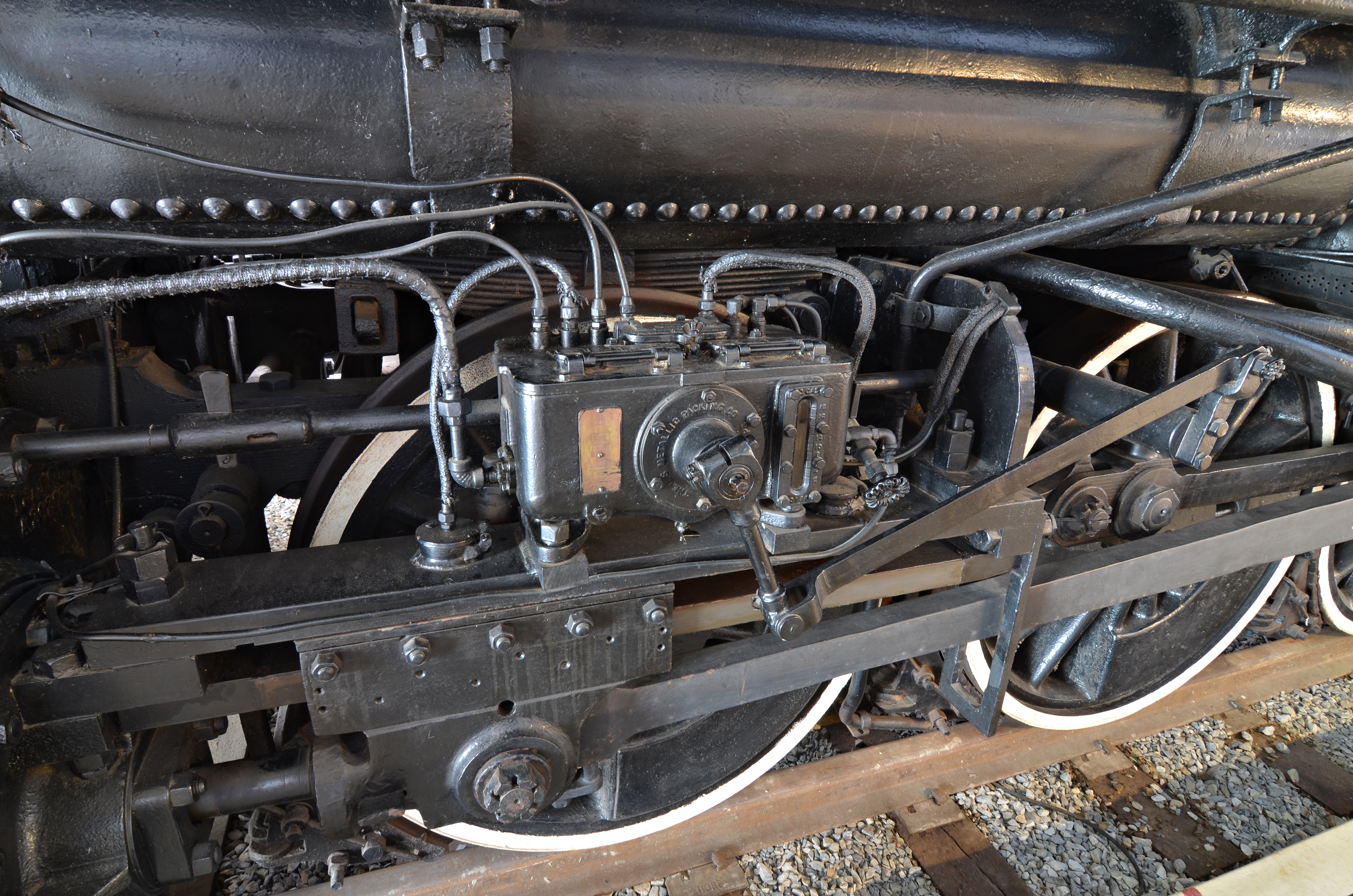
No. 1251's running gear and lubricator.

In October 1966, No. 1251 was formerly retired from excursion service after its flue time expired, and it was subsequently replaced by larger locomotives from the Canadian Pacific Railway, including 4-6-0 No. 972. Two years later, No. 1251 was sold to the Pennsylvania Historical and Museum Commission with the hopes of putting it on static display at Hart's future museum ground at Strasburg. No. 1251 was moved across the Strasburg Rail Road and was put in the yard of the new Railroad Museum of Pennsylvania for storage. As construction of the museum's building was almost completed in 1972, No. 1251 was outright donated to it as a permanent addition to their locomotive collection.

In 1982, museum volunteers worked to cosmetically restore No. 1251 to make it more presentable for public view, and when it was completed No. 1251 was moved inside the museum's main building, surrounded by a few Pennsylvania Railroad locomotives. As of 2025, the locomotive remains inside the museum.

== Historical significance ==
No. 1251 is a unique locomotive design, as no identical copies of the B-4as were ever made. It is also the only one of the 830 locomotives built new by the Reading to be preserved.

The locomotive also holds the distinction of being the last standard gauge steam locomotive in daily operation on a class I railroad in the United States.

== See also ==
- Reading 2102
- Reading 2124
- Canadian National 7312
- Pennsylvania Railroad 1223
