= Intervale, Virginia =

Unincorporated community in Virginia, United States

Coordinates: 37°17′53.4″N 79°58′39.1″W

Intervale is an unincorporated community in Alleghany County, Virginia, United States.
