= Canadian Pacific 1278 =

Preserved CP G5d class 4-6-2 locomotive

Type and origin
- Power type: Steam
- Builder: Canadian Locomotive Company
- Serial number: 2435
- Build date: April 1948
Specifications
- Configuration
  - Whyte: 4-6-2
  - UIC: 2'C1'
- Gauge: 4 ft 8 1/2 in (1,435 mm)
- Driver dia.: 70 in (1,778 mm)
- Trailing dia.: 45 in (1,143 mm)
- Wheelbase
  - Drivers: 15 ft (4.6 m)
- Length: 76 ft 4 1/8 in (23.3 m)
- Height: 14 ft 10 in (4.5 m)
- Axle load: 50,333 lb (22,830.7 kg; 22.8 t)
- Adhesive weight: 151,000 lb (68 t)
- Loco weight: 229,500 lb (104,099.4 kg; 104.1 t)
- Tender weight: 191,000 lb (86,636.1 kg; 86.6 t)
- Total weight: 420,500 lb (190,735.6 kg; 190.7 t)
- Fuel type: Coal
- Fuel capacity: 28,000 lb (13,000 kg; 13 t)
- Water cap.: 11,529 US gal (43,642 L; 9,600 imp gal)
- Firebox
  - Grate area: 45.6 sq ft (4.24 m^{2})
- Boiler pressure: 250 psi (1.72 MPa)
- Heating surface
  - Firebox: 199 sq ft (18.5 m^{2})
  - Total surface: 3,320 sq ft (308.4 m^{2})
- Superheater
  - Heating area: 744 sq ft (69.1 m^{2})
- Cylinders: Two, outside
- Cylinder size: 20 in × 28 in (508 mm × 711 mm)
- Valve gear: Walschaerts
- Valve type: Piston valves
- Loco brake: Air
- Train brakes: Air
- Couplers: Knuckle
Performance figures
- Tractive effort: 34,000 lbf (151.2 kN)
- Factor of adh.: 4.44
Career
- Operators: Canadian Pacific Railway; Steamtown, U.S.A.; High Iron Company; Cadillac and Lake City Railway; Gettysburg Railroad
- Class: G5d
- Number in class: 7th of 30
- Numbers: CP 1278; Steamtown 127; D&H 653; GETY 1278
- Retired: 1960 (revenue service); 1980 (1st excursion service); June 16, 1995 (2nd excursion service)
- Preserved: May 1965
- Restored: October 13, 1966 (1st excursion service); July 3, 1988 (2nd excursion service); 2017 (cosmetically)
- Current owner: Age of Steam Roundhouse
- Disposition: On static display

Canadian Pacific 1278 is a preserved G5d class 4-6-2 "Pacific" type steam locomotive built by the Canadian Locomotive Company (CLC) for the Canadian Pacific Railway (CP). After being retired from revenue service, the locomotive was purchased in 1965 by F. Nelson Blount for excursion trains at his Steamtown, U.S.A. collection. The locomotive was sold to Gettysburg Railroad (GETY) in 1987, and it pulled excursion trains between Gettysburg and Biglerville, but it was subject to very poor maintenance by inexperienced crews. The locomotive was retired from excursion service in 1995, after suffering a firebox explosion in June. As of 2026, the locomotive is on static display at the Age of Steam Roundhouse in Sugarcreek, Ohio.

== History ==
=== Canadian Pacific ===
No. 1278 was built by Canadian Locomotive Company (CLC) in April 1948 and is a type 4-6-2 class G5d light weight "Pacific" locomotive. The No. 1278 was one of thirty such G5d locomotives to be built. The No. 1278’s relatively lightweight construction and very sound design made the locomotives the perfect engines for light-rail, branch line duty on both CP’s passenger and freight trains. The development of this class of locomotive enabled the CP to retire many smaller, older and less powerful locomotives. The engine worked most of its career hauling freight and passenger trains throughout the Canadian Pacific Railway until it was retired from revenue service in 1960.

=== Steamtown U.S.A ===
After sitting idle for five years, No. 1278 was purchased in mid-1965 by F. Nelson Blount, and it was moved to his Steamtown, U.S.A. collection in Bellows Falls, Vermont. During the summer of 1966, No. 1278 underwent a restoration to operating condition, and in the process, it was renumbered to 127. Blount had planned to renumber all three of his CP G5 locomotives in his collection from Nos. 1246, 1278 and 1293 to Nos. 124, 127 and 129, respectively, but only No. 1278 received the road number change.

The locomotive was also modified with an Elesco bundle-type feedwater heater mounted across the top of its smokebox. In October 1966, No. 127's restoration was completed. That same month, Nelson Blount collaborated with fellow steam enthusiast Ross Rowland to host a series of mainline excursion trains on the Central Railroad of New Jersey's (CNJ) mainline between Jersey City, New Jersey and Jim Thorpe, Pennsylvania, and No. 127 was used to pull the trains. In the spring of 1967, No. 127 pulled some more excursion trains on the New Haven mainline between Boston, Worcester, Massachusetts, and Providence, Rhode Island.

In February 1968, Ross Rowland sponsored two more excursions, and CP G5 locomotives Nos. 1238 and 1286 were originally planned to pull the trains, but their owner, George Hart, had put them on an emergency lease to the city of Reading, Pennsylvania to provide warmth to one of their power plants. Rowland arranged to lease No. 127 and the Strasburg Rail Road's 2-10-0 No. 90 as pinch-hitters for the excursions. No. 127 hauled the first excursion solo on the CNJ, Lehigh Valley (LV), and Penn Central (PC) mainlines from Newark, New Jersey to Jim Thorpe, Pennsylvania, and then No. 90 doubleheaded with the G5 for assistance over the CNJ grades from Jim Thorpe to Ashley. The first excursion was plagued with problems; No. 127 stalled from a poor-burning fire, while in New Jersey; one of No. 90’s tender trucks fell apart and derailed, while traveling down the CNJ grades; and No. 127 struggled to negotiate a wye and was blocked by a derailed diesel, while in Ashley. The second excursion occurred on the same route, unblemished.

In 1970, the Cadillac and Lake City Railroad (C&LC) leased No. 127 to pull their tourist trains in Michigan, since one of their own locomotives, Ex-Saginaw Timber Co. No. 2, had developed a crack in its boiler shell. The C&LC's lease for No. 127 ended the following year, when the railroad discontinued their Michigan operations, and the G5d was returned to Steamtown.

In the winter of 1972-1973, No. 127 was moved to the Delaware and Hudson Railway's (D&H) Colonie, New York shops for an overhaul. During 1973, No. 127 was masqueraded as D&H No. 653, as part of the 150th anniversary celebrations of the D&H company. On April 28, No. 653 performed a doubleheader with Reading 2102—which masqueraded as D&H No. 302—while pulling the D&H's celebration train. No. 653 also doubleheaded with CP No. 1246—which masqueraded as Rutland Railroad No. 82—on an excursion to Rutland, Vermont. Following the end of the D&H celebrations, the G5d was reverted to its original livery as CP No. 1278. No. 1278 pulled its last excursion train for Steamtown in 1980, before it was removed from service when its flue time expired, and it was subsequently put on static display.

=== Gettysburg Railroad ===
After Steamtown moved to Scranton, Pennsylvania, Steamtown decided that their G5 locomotives were inadequate for service as they were deemed too light for the heavy grades and sharp curves of their Ex-Lackawanna mainline, hence why No. 1278 never operated in Scranton. In June 1987, in an effort to have a second operable steam locomotive by their grand reopening of that year, Steamtown struck a deal with the Gettysburg Railroad (GETY) to trade No. 1278 and $100,000 in exchange for Canadian National 3254. After extensive repairs were made to the G5d, No. 1278 pulled its first train for the Gettysburg Railroad on July 3, 1988, when it carried passengers to the rededication ceremony of a Civil War veterans memorial. The locomotive was subsequently used to pull the railroad's tourist trains between Gettysburg, Biglerville, and Mount Holly Springs alongside Mississippian Railway 2-8-0 No. 76, until 1995.

==== 1995 boiler explosion ====
On June 16, 1995, No. 1278 was pulling a six-car dinner excursion for the Gettysburg Railroad with 310 passengers, but at 7:20 pm near Gardners, the locomotive suffered a crown sheet failure, creating an explosion inside the firebox. At the moment of detonation, one of the two fireman on the locomotive was sticking a shovel through the firebox door, and it consequently released fire and steam into the cab. The two firemen jumped out of the cab, while the engineer, 48-year-old Jim Cornell, remained inside to bring No. 1278 to a safe stop, before following suit.

All three crew members were burned and were injured from jumping out of the cab, and the two firemen were taken to area hospitals, while Cornell was taken to a burn center in Philadelphia. While the railroad continued to run their excursions using only diesel locomotives, the National Transportation Safety Board (NTSB) and the Federal Railroad Administration (FRA) investigated the cause of the explosion. The chief mechanical officer of the Valley Railroad (VALE), J. David Conrad, was brought in to help aid the NTSB’s evaluation of the Gettysburg's operations.

The cause of the failure was the crown sheet overheating, due to a lack of a sufficient water level being obtained, and the crown sheet softened and ruptured away from the crown staybolts. Due to Canadian Pacific's policy of alternating the row design of the crown stays in their locomotives to intentionally control such a catastrophe, the firebox was the only part of No. 1278 that received major damage from the explosion. The NTSB also discovered that many of No. 1278's components were shoddily maintained: the water injector was leaking from an incorrect part installation, and the water glass, which was designed to display the accurate water level inside the boiler, was displaying an inaccurate level, since its spindles were plugged with hard scale from not being cleaned out monthly.

The investigation also revealed that the workforces of the Gettysburg Railroad, including the two firemen on No. 1278, had insufficient training and knowledge of how to correctly maintain steam locomotives, and the railroad’s training program was found to be incomprehensible for the workforces. Upon releasing its final report in 1996, the NTSB recommended the FRA to reinforce regulations for steam locomotive operations and maintenance in the United States. To that end, the FRA introduced the 1,472-day inspection process, which became law in 2000.

=== Disposition ===
After the incident, the Gettysburg Railroad gave up on steam operations and only used diesel locomotives for their trains, and the railroad was sold to RailAmerica subsidiary Delaware Valley Railway. No. 1278 was indefinitely retired from excursion service after its boiler incident, and the railroad did not attempt any repairs to its damaged firebox. The locomotive was later purchased by Jerry Joe Jacobson at an auction in 1998. In 1999, it was moved to an Ohio Central Railroad (OHCR) storage facility in Morgan Run, Ohio. While No. 1278 was cannibalized for spare parts to keep the OHCR's No. 1293 operational, Jacobson hoped to eventually rebuild No. 1278 for excursion usage, but progress never began. In 2016, No. 1278 was moved inside the Age of Steam Roundhouse (AOSR) in Sugarcreek, Ohio, for protection from the outdoor elements. The damage from the firebox incident is repairable, and the locomotive could be restored to operation if desired, but as of 2026, No. 1278 remains on static display within the roundhouse.

== Surviving sister engines ==
- No. 1201 is currently on static display inside the Canada Science and Technology Museum in Ottawa, Ontario in Canada.
- No. 1238 is currently in storage at the Prairie Dog Central Railway in Winnipeg, Manitoba in Canada.
- No. 1246 is currently in storage at the Railroad Museum of New England in Thomaston, Connecticut in the United States.
- No. 1286 is currently in storage under private ownership at the Prairie Dog Central Railway in Winnipeg, Manitoba in Canada.
- No. 1293 is currently on display at the Age of Steam Roundhouse in Sugarcreek, Ohio in the United States, waiting for a rebuild.
