= Meadow River Lumber Company 1 =

Preserved American 2-truck Shay locomotive

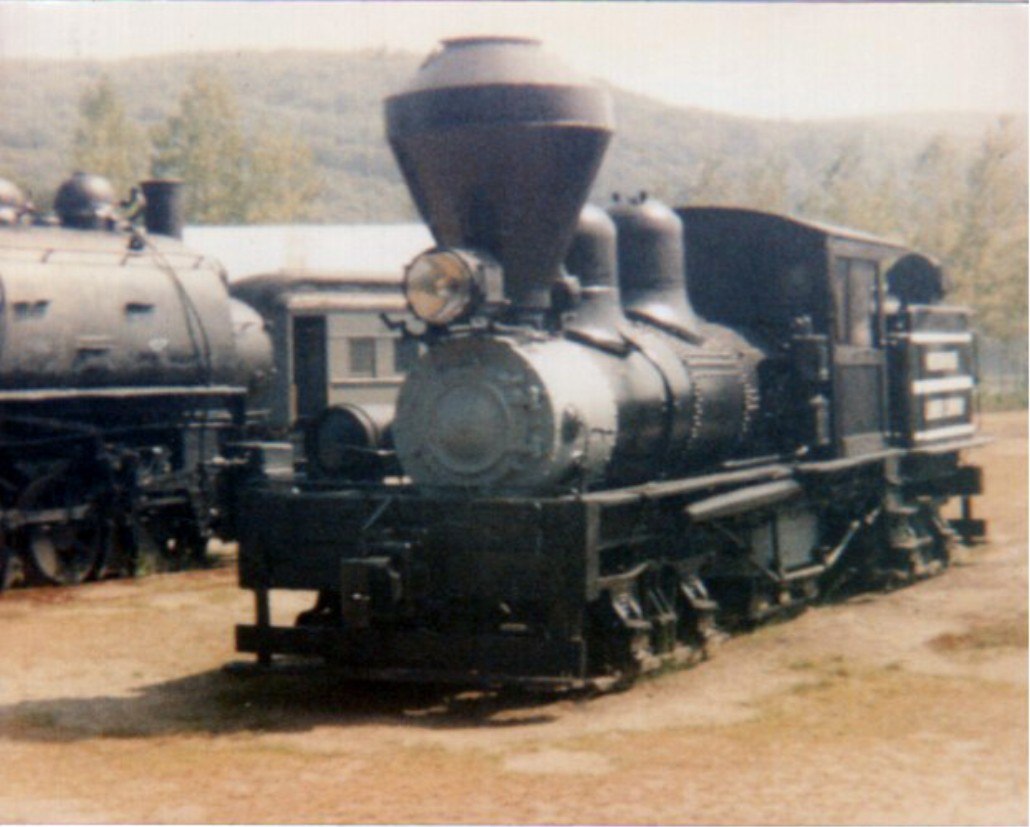
- Meadow River Lumber Company No. 1 on display at Steamtown USA in Bellow Falls, Vermont in 1974
Type and origin
- Power type: Steam
- Builder: Lima Locomotive Works
- Serial number: 2317
- Model: Class B 42-2 Shay locomotive
- Build date: May 1910
Specifications
- Configuration
  - Whyte: 2-truck Shay
  - AAR: B-B
  - UIC: B′B′ n3t
- Gauge: 4 ft 8 1/2 in (1,435 mm)
- Driver dia.: 29.5 in (749 mm)
- Loco weight: 86,000 lb (39.0 tonnes)
- Fuel type: Wood or Coal
- Boiler pressure: 180 lbf/in^{2} (1.24 MPa)
- Cylinders: Three, outside, vertical
- Cylinder size: 10 in × 12 in (254 mm × 305 mm)
Performance figures
- Tractive effort: 16,900 lbf (75.2 kN)
Career
- Operators: Sewell Valley Railroad; Meadow River Lumber Company
- Numbers: SVR 1; MRLC 1
- Locale: West Virginia
- Retired: 1960s
- Current owner: Steamtown National Historic Site
- Disposition: Undergoing restoration to operating condition

External image
- nps.gov

Meadow River Lumber Company 1 is a Shay locomotive at Steamtown National Historic Site, in Scranton, Pennsylvania. This 2-truck Shay was built by Lima Locomotive Works (LLW) in May 1910. This type of locomotive was used primarily by lumber and mining companies. Some were used by other industries and on short lines. This is one of 77 Shay locomotives preserved in the United States.

== History ==
In 1907, John and T.W. Raines began construction on a lumber mill in Greenbrier County, West Virginia, under the name of the Meadow River Lumber Company. The location had no access to a railway so the Sewell Valley Railroad was incorporated. Twenty miles of track was laid between the Chesapeake and Ohio Railway (C&O) at Meadow Creek to the site of the mill. No. 1 was constructed in May 1910 by the Baldwin Locomotive Works (BLW), the mill opened in September 1910 and the locomotive was purchased by the new railroad. It was called Sewell Valley Railroad No. 1.

With a capacity of cutting 110,000 board feet (300 m^{3}) of lumber per day, the Meadow River Lumber Company became the world's largest hardwood manufacturer. At first the railroad was operated separately from its parent company. However, changes in the tax code lead the two to merge therefore, "Meadow River Lumber Company No. 1, spent her entire career as the property of this single lumber enterprise [sic] even though she operated there under two different names."

While at Steamtown, U.S.A. in Bellows Falls, Vermont, the locomotive endured extensive damage when the building it was stored in collapsed under heavy snow in February 1982. The Shay's wooden cab was destroyed. By then it was already missing "its sand dome, its headlight, its front number plate, its bell and bell hanger, whistle, and other components". Canadian Pacific Railway No. 1293 was also damaged in the roof collapse.

It was determined that it would remain at the National Historic Site as it was the only geared locomotive in the collection. As of 2025, No. 1 is being fully restored to operating condition, and is hoped to be done before the 2027 operating season.
