= Canadian Pacific 1246 =

Preserved CP G5c class 4-6-2 locomotive

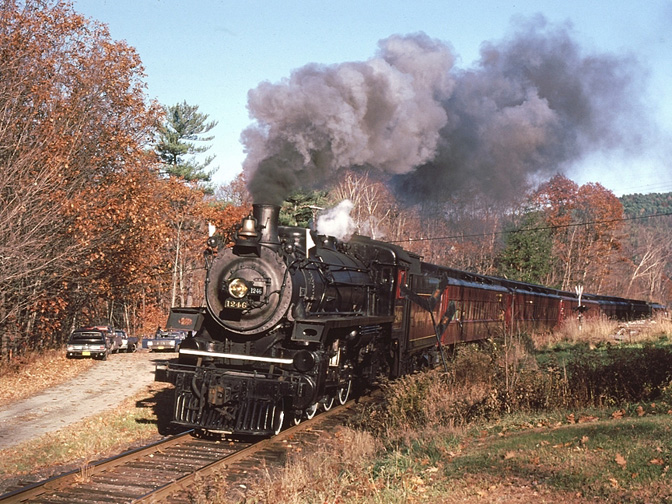
- CP No. 1246 at Brockway Mills in Rockingham, Vermont on October 24, 1981
Type and origin
- Power type: Steam
- Builder: Montreal Locomotive Works
- Serial number: 74906
- Build date: June 1946
Specifications
- Configuration
  - Whyte: 4-6-2
  - UIC: 2'C1'
- Gauge: 4 ft 8 1/2 in (1,435 mm)
- Leading dia.: 33 in (838 mm)
- Driver dia.: 70 in (1,778 mm)
- Trailing dia.: 45 in (1,143 mm)
- Wheelbase
  - Drivers: 15 ft (4.6 m)
- Length: 76 ft 4 1/8 in (23.3 m)
- Height: 14 ft 10 in (4.5 m)
- Axle load: 50,333 lb (22,830.7 kg; 22.8 t)
- Adhesive weight: 151,000 lb (68,492.4 kg; 68.5 t)
- Loco weight: 229,500 lb (104,099.4 kg; 104.1 t)
- Tender weight: 191,000 lb (86,636.1 kg; 86.6 t)
- Total weight: 420,500 lb (190,735.6 kg; 190.7 t)
- Fuel type: Coal
- Fuel capacity: 28,000 lb (13,000 kg; 13 t)
- Water cap.: 11,529 US gal (43,642 L; 9,600 imp gal)
- Firebox
  - Grate area: 45.6 sq ft (4.24 m^{2})
- Boiler pressure: 250 psi (1.72 MPa)
- Heating surface
  - Firebox: 199 sq ft (18.5 m^{2})
  - Total surface: 3,320 sq ft (308.4 m^{2})
- Superheater
  - Heating area: 744 sq ft (69.1 m^{2})
- Cylinders: Two, outside
- Cylinder size: 20 in × 28 in (508 mm × 711 mm)
- Valve gear: Walschaerts
- Valve type: Piston valves
- Loco brake: Air
- Train brakes: Air
- Couplers: Knuckle
Performance figures
- Tractive effort: 34,000 lbf (151.2 kN)
- Factor of adh.: 4.44
Career
- Operators: Canadian Pacific Railway; Steamtown, U.S.A.; Green Mountain Railroad; Steamtown National Historic Site; Naugatuck Railroad
- Class: G5c
- Number in class: 14 of 40
- Numbers: CP 1246; Rutland 82
- First run: July 1946
- Last run: March 1958
- Retired: June 15, 1958 (revenue service); March 1986 (excursion service)
- Preserved: October 29, 1988
- Restored: June 1967 (1st excursion service); 1996 (cosmetically)
- Current owner: Railroad Museum of New England
- Disposition: Stored outdoors

Canadian Pacific 1246 is a preserved G5c class 4-6-2 "Pacific" type steam locomotive, built in 1946 by the Montreal Locomotive Works (MLW). In 1965, it became one of three G5 locomotives to be purchased by Steamtown, U.S.A. for excursion service. After operating in Scranton for a few years in the 1980s, No. 1246 was sold at an October 1988 auction to the Railroad Museum of New England (RMNE) with plans to restore and operate it, and it was initially put on static display. As of 2026, No. 1246 is stored at the Railroad Museum of New England.

== History ==
=== Revenue service ===
No. 1246 was built by the Montreal Locomotive Works (MLW) in Montreal, Quebec. It rolled out of the Shops in June 1946 as the fourteenth member of the Canadian Pacific Railway's (CP) G5c class. It was initially assigned by the CP to operate in Alberta and Saskatchewan in Western Canada, and it travelled for 655,773 miles during its revenue career between July 1946 and March 1958. Despite having a 4-6-2 wheel arrangement, No. 1246 was primarily used for freight service, and records only show the locomotive hauling passengers for a combined total of thirteen months. The G5c was overhauled for the sixth and final time by the CP at Winnipeg, coming out of Weston Shops on June 15, 1958. However, the locomotive never operated for the CP again after the overhaul.

=== Steamtown ownership ===
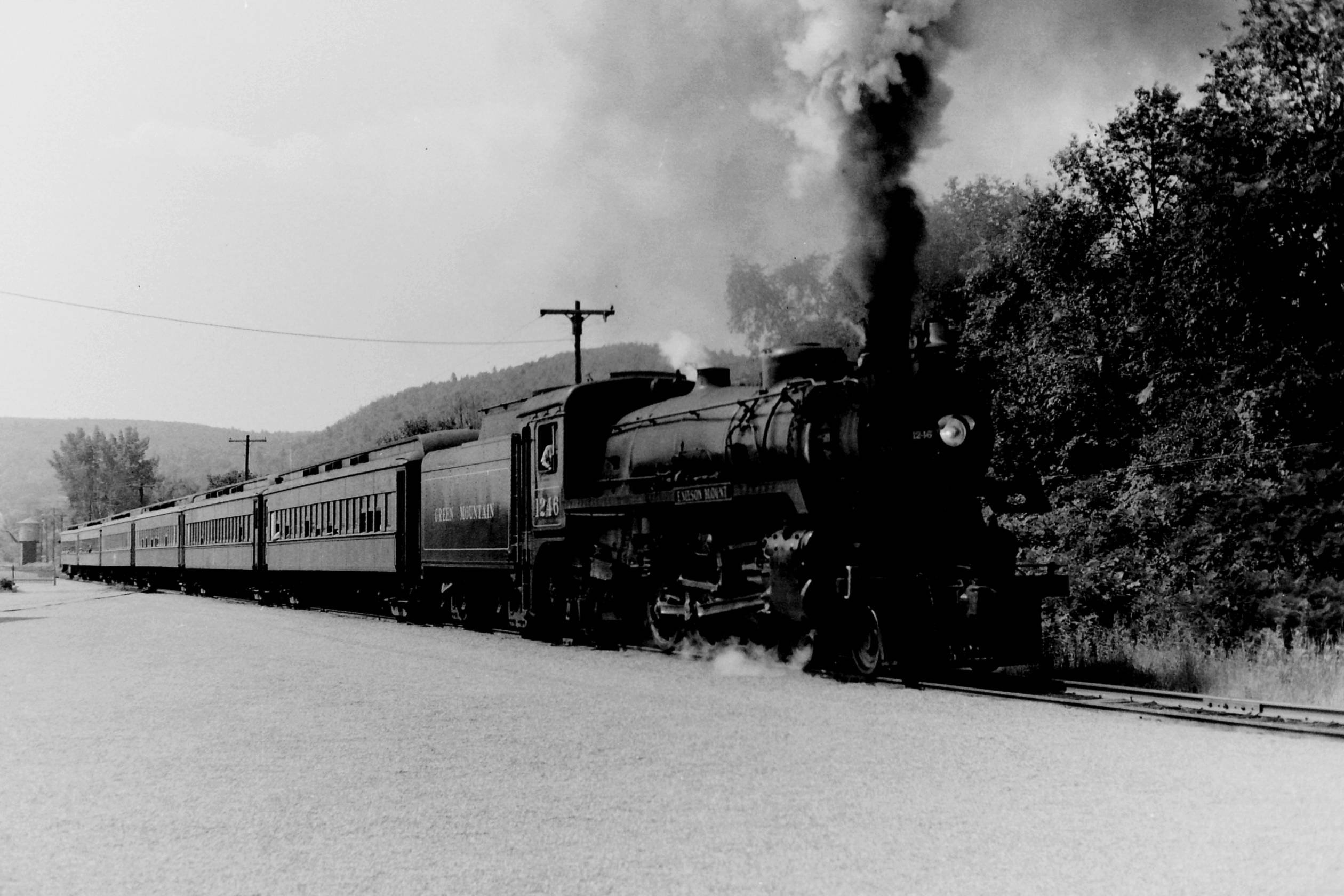
CP 1246 pulling a passenger train at Steamtown USA in Bellows Falls, Vermont, August 1970

After sitting idle for seven years, No. 1246 became one of three G5 class locomotives to be purchased in May 1965 for $8,200 by F. Nelson Blount for his Steamtown, U.S.A. collection. The other two G5s in the Steamtown collection were G5ds No. 1278 and No. 1293. No. 1246 was towed from one of the CP's scrap lines to North Walpole, New Hampshire for static display in Steamtown. In 1966, the locomotive was moved along with the rest of the collection to Bellows Falls, Vermont in order for the locomotives to be more spread out while on display. In June 1967, Canadian Pacific 1246 was transferred to the Green Mountain Railroad (GMRR) with the intention of restoring it to operate on their trackage. The locomotive was restored in 1969, and it was modified with a visor headlight and a mounted bell above the smokebox, and it was given a nameplate with the lettering “F. Nelson Blount” to pay tribute to Blount's passing two years prior. No. 1246 was used by the GMRR to pull multiple excursion trains between Bellows Falls and Chester alongside No. 1293, as well as Canadian National 2-6-0 No. 89 and Rahway Valley 2-8-0 No. 15.

When Steamtown and the GMRR went their separate ways, ownership of the locomotive was transferred back to Steamtown in August 1973, and its nameplate was removed. It subsequently accompanied No. 1278 to pull trains over the Vermont Railway between Bennington and Burlington. In December 1973, No. 1246 was temporarily relettered as Rutland No. 82, and it performed a doubleheader excursion to Rutland, Vermont with No. 1278, which masqueraded as Delaware and Hudson No. 653. In the late 1970s, No. 1246 was painted in CP gray-blue and Tuscan red, a livery it never wore in revenue service. However, after falling victim to a roundhouse collapse in 1982, the locomotive was repaired with new flues, and it was painted black again with its visor headlight and mounted bell removed. In the fall of 1983, No. 1246 led the "farewell to Vermont" excursions alongside No. 1293 and G3c No. 2317. There were two 100-mile (160 km) excursions "through a landscape of covered bridges, rushing streams and scenic countryside". The final train held a capacity of 800–1,000 passengers.

Upon arrival in Scranton, Pennsylvania, No. 1246 began pulling excursion trains over the ex-Delaware, Lackawanna and Western (DLW) line between Scranton and Moscow. In March 1986, however, it was decided that No. 1246 was inadequate for service as it was deemed too light for the heavy grades and sharp curves of Steamtown's new trackage, and the locomotive's flue time was close to expiring. When the National Park Service (NPS) purchased Steamtown, they reopened it as Steamtown National Historic Site, and No. 1246 was among five steam locomotives the NPS deemed inadequate for the collection. The locomotive was sold at Steamtown's final auction on October 29, 1988.

=== Disposition ===
The new owner of No, 1246 was the Railroad Museum of New England (RMNE), who moved it to their leased location in Essex, Connecticut in April 1989. The RMNE purchased No. 1246 with the hopes of bringing it back to steam to operate at a new site. Although No. 1246 never operated on Valley Railroad's (VALE) trackage, RMNE cosmetically restored it in 1996 for static display in Old Saybrook. In 2008, the museum moved No. 1246 along with other rolling stock in their collection to Thomaston, Connecticut, a town where the Naugatuck Railroad operates. As of 2025, No. 1246 remains in outdoor storage in Thomaston. Long-term plans are for an operational restoration.

== Surviving sister engines ==
- No. 1201 is on static display inside the Canada Science and Technology Museum in Ottawa, Ontario in Canada.
- No. 1238 is in storage at the Prairie Dog Central Railway in Winnipeg, Manitoba in Canada, awaiting to be moved to the Waterloo Central Railway.
- No. 1278 is on static display at the Age of Steam Roundhouse in Sugarcreek, Ohio in the United States.
- No. 1286 is in storage under private ownership at the Prairie Dog Central Railway in Winnipeg, Manitoba in Canada.
- No. 1293 is on static display at the Age of Steam Roundhouse in Sugarcreek, Ohio in the United States, awaiting for a rebuild.
