= Canadian Pacific 1293 =

Preserved CP G5d class 4-6-2 locomotive

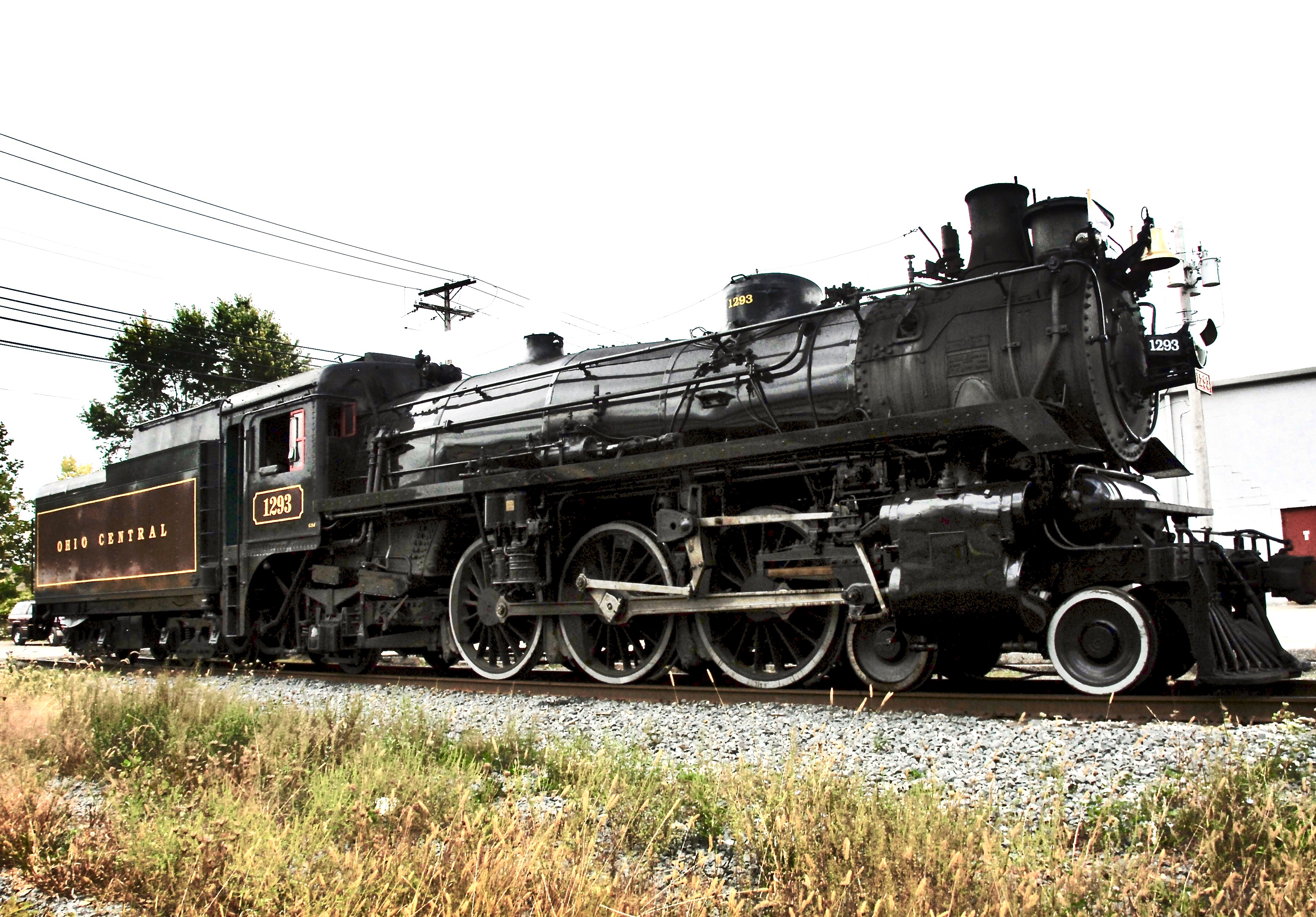
- CP No. 1293 idling on the Ohio Central Railroad, on September 28, 2008
Type and origin
- Power type: Steam
- Builder: Canadian Locomotive Company
- Serial number: 2450
- Build date: June 1948
Specifications
- Configuration
  - Whyte: 4-6-2
  - UIC: 2'C1'
- Gauge: 4 ft 8 1/2 in (1,435 mm)
- Driver dia.: 70 in (1,778 mm)
- Trailing dia.: 45 in (1,143 mm)
- Wheelbase
  - Drivers: 15 ft (4.6 m)
- Length: 76 ft 4 1/8 in (23.3 m)
- Height: 14 ft 10 in (4.5 m)
- Axle load: 50,333 lb (22,830.7 kg; 22.8 t)
- Adhesive weight: 151,000 lb (68.5 tonnes)
- Loco weight: 229,500 lb (104,099.4 kg; 104.1 t)
- Tender weight: 191,000 lb (86,636.1 kg; 86.6 t)
- Total weight: 420,500 lb (190,735.6 kg; 190.7 t)
- Fuel type: Coal
- Fuel capacity: 28,000 lb (13,000 kg; 13 t)
- Water cap.: 11,529 US gal (43,642 L; 9,600 imp gal)
- Firebox
  - Grate area: 45.6 sq ft (4.24 m^{2})
- Boiler pressure: 250 psi (1.72 MPa)
- Heating surface
  - Firebox: 199 sq ft (18.5 m^{2})
  - Total surface: 3,320 sq ft (308.4 m^{2})
- Superheater
  - Heating area: 744 sq ft (69.1 m^{2})
- Cylinders: Two, outside
- Cylinder size: 20 in × 28 in (508 mm × 711 mm)
- Valve gear: Walschaerts
- Valve type: Piston valves
- Loco brake: Air
- Train brakes: Air
- Couplers: Knuckle
Performance figures
- Maximum speed: 85 mph (137 km/h)
- Tractive effort: 34,000 lbf (151.2 kN)
- Factor of adh.: 4.44
Career
- Operators: Canadian Pacific Railway; Steamtown, U.S.A.; Ohio Central Railroad System; Cuyahoga Valley Scenic Railroad; Age of Steam Roundhouse
- Class: G5d
- Number in class: 22nd of 30
- Numbers: CP 1293; GMRR 1293; OHCR 1293
- Retired: 1959 (revenue service); 1984 (1st excursion service)
- Restored: September 1964 (1st excursion service); September 18, 1997 (2nd excursion service)
- Current owner: Age of Steam Roundhouse
- Disposition: Undergoing 1,472-day inspection and overhaul

Canadian Pacific 1293 is a preserved G5d class 4-6-2 "Pacific" type steam locomotive, built in June 1948 by the Canadian Locomotive Company (CLC) for the Canadian Pacific Railway (CP). Built for passenger service, No. 1293 served an eight-year career until being replaced by diesel locomotives where it was then retired in 1959. Purchased in 1964 by F. Nelson Blount for use at his Steamtown site in Bellows Falls, Vermont, No. 1293 was easily restored to operation for hauling fan trips for the general public. No. 1293 was later sold to the Ohio Central Railroad in 1996 for tourist train service. As of 2026, the locomotive is at the Age of Steam Roundhouse in Sugarcreek, Ohio, Undergoing its 1,472-day inspection and overhaul.

== History ==
=== Revenue service ===
No. 1293 was built in June 1948 by the Canadian Locomotive Company (CLC) and is the twenty-second of the G5d class locomotives built. The locomotive was used by the Canadian Pacific Railway (CP) to work passenger and freight trains across branch lines and secondary lines. It was retired in 1959 after only eight years of service when diesel power made it obsolete.

=== Steamtown ownership ===
In January 1964, No. 1293 was purchased by F. Nelson Blount, and it was moved to his Steamtown, U.S.A. collection in Bellows Falls, Vermont. Blount would also acquire fellow CP G5 Nos. 1246 and 1278. In the fall of that year, No. 1293 was test ran on Steamtown’s trackage with some assistance from Rahway Valley 15. The Steamtown Foundation subsequently leased the locomotive to the Green Mountain Railroad, until July 1973.

In August 1976, No. 1293 was rebuilt and pulled the Vermont Bicentennial Steam Expedition train on the Central Vermont mainline between Bellows Falls and Burlington, Vermont. Leased by the state of Vermont for 80-mile (100 km) excursions that were scheduled for the entire year, the G5d was proclaimed as "The Spirit of Ethan Allen".

In 1980, No. 1293 was temporarily renumbered as No. 1881 and painted black with silver stripes, and it was leased to a Hollywood company for use in the filming of Terror Train (1980), a horror film starring Jamie Lee Curtis. After filming was completed, No. 1293 was repainted in black, gold, and tuscan red; a color scheme used by CP passenger locomotives in the 1930s. In February 1982, the headlights, handrails and cab roof of No. 1293 were damaged when the roof of a Steamtown storage building gave way to heavy snow. After some repairs were made to the locomotive, it operated multiple excursion trains throughout the 1983 season alongside Nos. 1246 and 2317 to bid farewell to Steamtown's former home of Bellows Falls, before the entire collection would be moved to Scranton, Pennsylvania the following year.

Although the Steamtown Special History Study reasoned that, since this type of locomotive had historically operated in New England, perhaps as far south as Boston, it qualified to be part of the federal government's collection, the Canadian native sat unused for 12 years following the move to Scranton.

=== Ohio Central Railroad ===
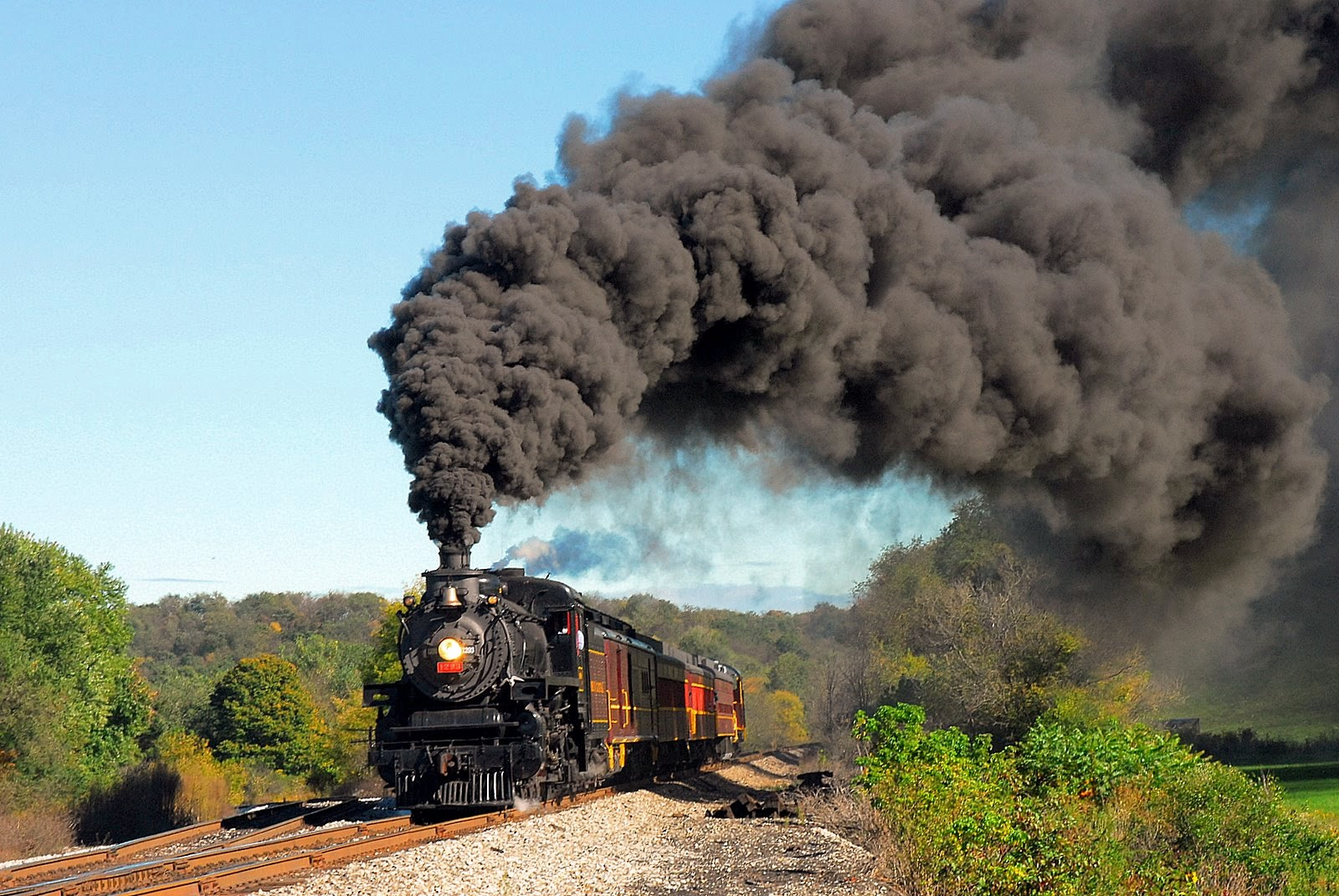
No. 1293 pulling an excursion on the Ohio Central, on October 7, 2006

The Ohio Central Railroad System (OHCR) purchased it in 1996 and it underwent a 13-month rebuild. On September 18, 1997, the locomotive returned to service and found itself on a new lease on life by pulling excursion trains out of Sugarcreek, Ohio alongside other locomotives, including Canadian National 4-6-0 No. 1551 (which is also a former relic of Steamtown, USA), Buffalo Creek and Gauley 2-8-0 No. 13, Grand Trunk Western 4-8-4 No. 6325, and Lake Superior and Ishpeming 2-8-0 No. 33.

The year 2004 saw a huge event in Ohio Central's steam operations when "Train Festival 2004" took place from July 30 to August 1, 2004, in Dennison, Ohio. It was a major event featuring all of the OC's steam locomotives, some historic diesel locomotives as well as rolling stock, and many more rail-related activities, and No. 1293 took part in the event.

No. 1293 was loaned to the Cuyahoga Valley Scenic Railroad (CVSR) to operate between Independence and Akron between 2005 and 2008 and in 2012.

=== Age of Steam Roundhouse ===
The Ohio Central Railroad had been purchased by Gennessee and Wyoming, but owner Jerry Joe Jacobson still maintained a small collection of vintage equipment, including No. 1293 and sister engine No. 1278, at his Age of Steam Roundhouse, near Sugarcreek.

No. 1293 is currently undergoing its 1,472-day inspection and rebuild.

== Surviving sister engines ==
- No. 1201 is currently on static display inside the Canada Science and Technology Museum in Ottawa, Ontario in Canada.
- No. 1238 is currently in storage at the Prairie Dog Central Railway in Winnipeg, Manitoba in Canada, awaiting to be moved to the Waterloo Central Railway.
- No. 1246 is in storage at the Railroad Museum of New England in Thomaston, Connecticut in the United States.
- No. 1278 is on static display at the Age of Steam Roundhouse in Sugarcreek, Ohio in the United States.
- No. 1286 is with No. 1238 in storage at the Prairie Dog Central Railway in Winnipeg, Manitoba in Canada.
