= Steamtown, U.S.A. =

Museum in Vermont, United States

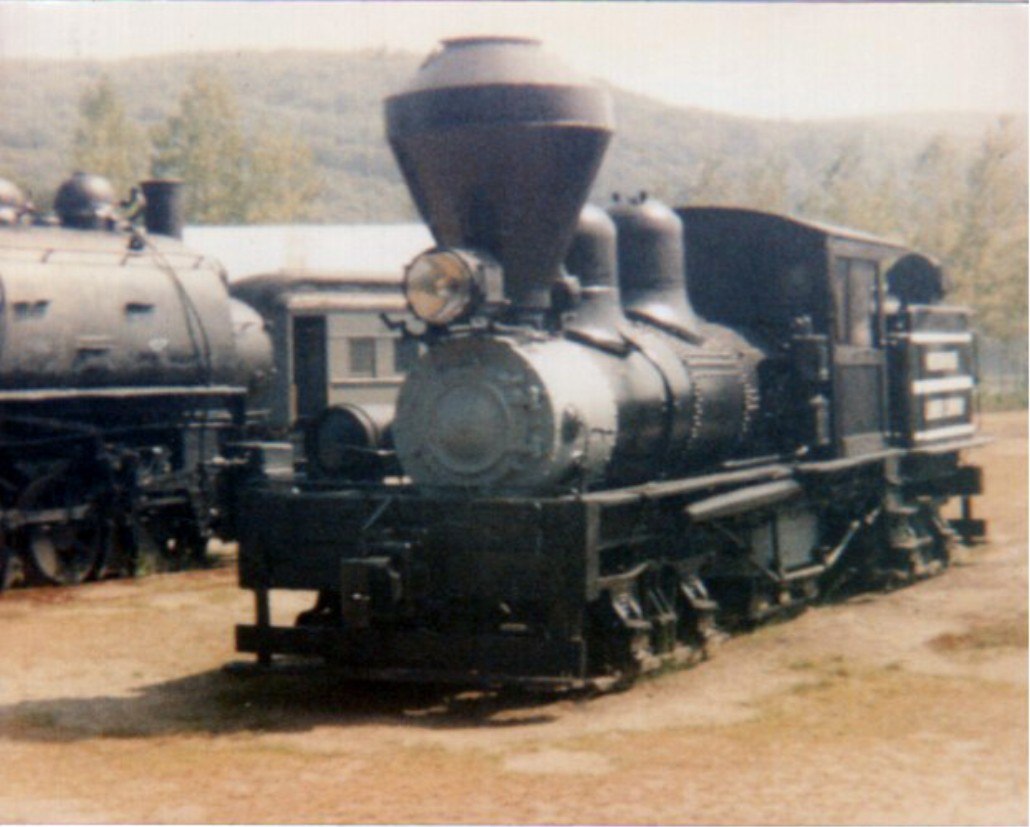
- Meadow River Lumber Company Shay #1 on static display at Steamtown, Bellows Falls, Vermont, ca. 1974
- Established: 1963
- Dissolved: 1983
- Location: Bellows Falls, Vermont
- Coordinates: 43°9′42″N 72°27′13″W
- Type: Steam locomotive and other rail equipment
- Collection size: 40
- Visitors: 41,000
- Director: Don Ball Jr.
- Presidents: F. Nelson Blount (1963–1967); Robert W. Adams (1967–1978)
- Curator: Ann Roos

Steamtown, U.S.A., was a steam locomotive museum that ran steam excursions out of North Walpole, New Hampshire, and Bellows Falls, Vermont, from 1963 to 1983.

The museum was founded by millionaire seafood industrialist F. Nelson Blount, then operated after his 1967 death by the non-profit Steamtown Foundation. Vermont's air-quality regulations limited steam excursions, visitor attendance declined, and disputes arose over the use of track. In the mid-1980s, some pieces of the collection were auctioned off and the rest moved to Scranton, Pennsylvania, where Steamtown continued to operate but failed to attract the expected 200,000–400,000 visitors. Within two years, the tourist attraction was facing bankruptcy, and more pieces of the collection were sold to pay off debt.

In 1986, the United States House of Representatives, at the urging of Pennsylvania Representative Joseph M. McDade, approved $8 million to study the collection and to begin to make it a National Historic Site. The National Park Service (NPS) conducted historical research on the foundation’s equipment, producing a Scope of Collections Statement for the Steamtown National Historic Site, published in 1991 under the title Steamtown Special History Study. The report contained concise histories of each piece of equipment and made recommendations as to whether each piece belonged in the soon-to-be government-funded collection.

By 1995, Steamtown had been acquired and developed by the NPS with a $66 million allocation. Several more pieces have since been removed from the collection.

== History ==
=== Formation of the collection ===
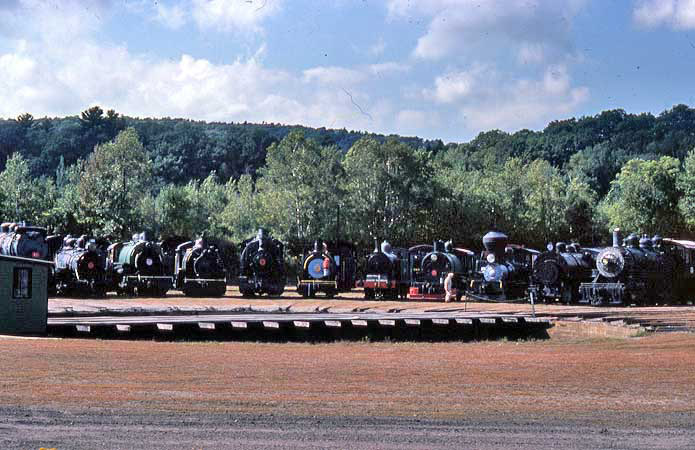
Locomotives at the turntable at Steamtown, U.S.A., Bellows Falls, Vermont

F. Nelson Blount, the heir to the largest seafood processor in the United States, was an avid railroad enthusiast. When he was just seventeen years old he wrote a book on steam power. After he acquired the narrow-gauge Edaville Railroad in Carver, Massachusetts, in 1955, and began amassing one of the largest collections of antique steam locomotives in the United States. In addition to the Edaville Railroad, Blount also ran excursions at Pleasure Island in Wakefield, Massachusetts, and Freedomland U.S.A. in New York City. By 1964, another part of his collection housed at an engine facility purchased from the Boston & Maine at North Walpole, New Hampshire consisted of 25 steam locomotives from the United States and Canada, 10 other locomotives, and 25 pieces of rolling stock.

On April 26, 1961, Blount and his associates founded the Monadnock, Steamtown & Northern Railroad Amusement Corporation to be the separate tourist railroad operator for his planned museum, Steamtown U.S.A. Blount hoped to open Steamtown at his facility in North Walpole and run excursions with the MS&N over the Boston & Maine's Cheshire Branch to Keene. When B&M labor issues intervened, Blount negotiated with shortline railroad owner Sam Pinsly to operate on 18 miles of the Claremont & Concord Railway between Bradford, New Hampshire and Sunapee, New Hampshire. Starting on July 22, 1961, the MS&N operation at Lake Sunapee utilized a former Canadian National Railway 4-6-4T steam locomotive, #47, and several former Boston & Maine wooden coaches. The steam operation came to an early end on August 25 when the locomotive was removed from service on account of missing maintenance paperwork, which had been disposed of by the Canadian National when they retired #47 in 1958. Copies were ultimately found in Canada, but revealed that the locomotive was due for re-tubing (the paperwork is commonly misinterpreted as having been lost in a fire). A diesel replacement was used for an additional seven days until September 17, but was not popular. Despite common belief, the 1961 season was not the first operation of Steamtown U.S.A., but rather the separate excursion operator, Monadnock, Steamtown & Northern.

In 1962 the MS&N ran excursions between Keene and Gilboa on the Boston & Maine's Cheshire Branch. Blount came close to entering into an agreement with the state of New Hampshire in which he would donate 20 locomotives in return for a state-funded Steamtown USA, to be located in Keene. This plan was well-received locally in Keene, where support was fostered by Mayor Robert L. Mallat Jr. The plan was initially approved by New Hampshire governor Wesley Powell. It was determined that ownership of the Cheshire Branch by either Blount or the state of New Hampshire was essential, yet the B&M delayed a sale agreement while statewide pressure mounted. The Keene plans were later rejected in early 1963 by the new governor, John W. King. An advisory committee had said of the proposed plan, that it "does not take advantage of anything that is singularly and peculiarly New Hampshire."

In 1963, incorporation papers were filed for the "Steamtown Foundation for the Preservation of Steam and Railroad Americana". The non-profit charitable, educational organization was to have nine non-salaried directors, including Blount and the four other incorporators: Lane Dwinell, a former New Hampshire governor; Emile Bussiere; Robert L. Mallat Jr., mayor of Keene; and Bellows Falls Municipal Judge Thomas P. Salmon, who would later become governor of Vermont. Other directors included Blount Seafood vice president Fredrick Richardson and William B. Murphy, who was president of the Campbell Soup Company and had also served as national chairman of Radio Free Europe. Steamtown U.S.A. opened for the first time as a museum, and the MS&N ran excursions again over the Cheshire Branch, this time from North Walpole to Westmoreland. Blount entered into talks with the state of Vermont to operate on the former Rutland Railroad, which had just been approved for total abandonment. The Steamtown Foundation's first order of business was to acquire the Blount collection at North Walpole, and move it to a new property, "Riverside", once owned by the Rutland Railroad across the Connecticut River near Bellows Falls, Vermont.

In 1964, Blount founded the Green Mountain Railroad to assume freight duties on the former Rutland line between Bellows Falls and Rutland. The MS&N began operating excursions over that trackage in 1964, and Green Mountain freight service began on April 3, 1965. Meanwhile, pieces of the Steamtown collection began to make their way from North Walpole to Riverside.

=== Steamtown in Vermont ===
By 1967, a good deal of Blount's collection was controlled by the Steamtown Foundation and had been moved to Riverside. The Green Mountain Railroad controlled the tracks that Steamtown was to use for its excursions between Walpole, Bellows Falls, and Chester, Vermont.

Blount was killed on August 31, 1967, when his private airplane collided with a tree during an emergency landing in Marlboro, New Hampshire. Most of the controlling stock of the GMRC was transferred to Robert W. Adams, president of the Green Mountain, which temporarily assumed passenger excursion operations. Now redundant, the Monadnock, Steamtown & Amusement Corporation ceased operations in December 1967; it would be dissolved in August 1971.

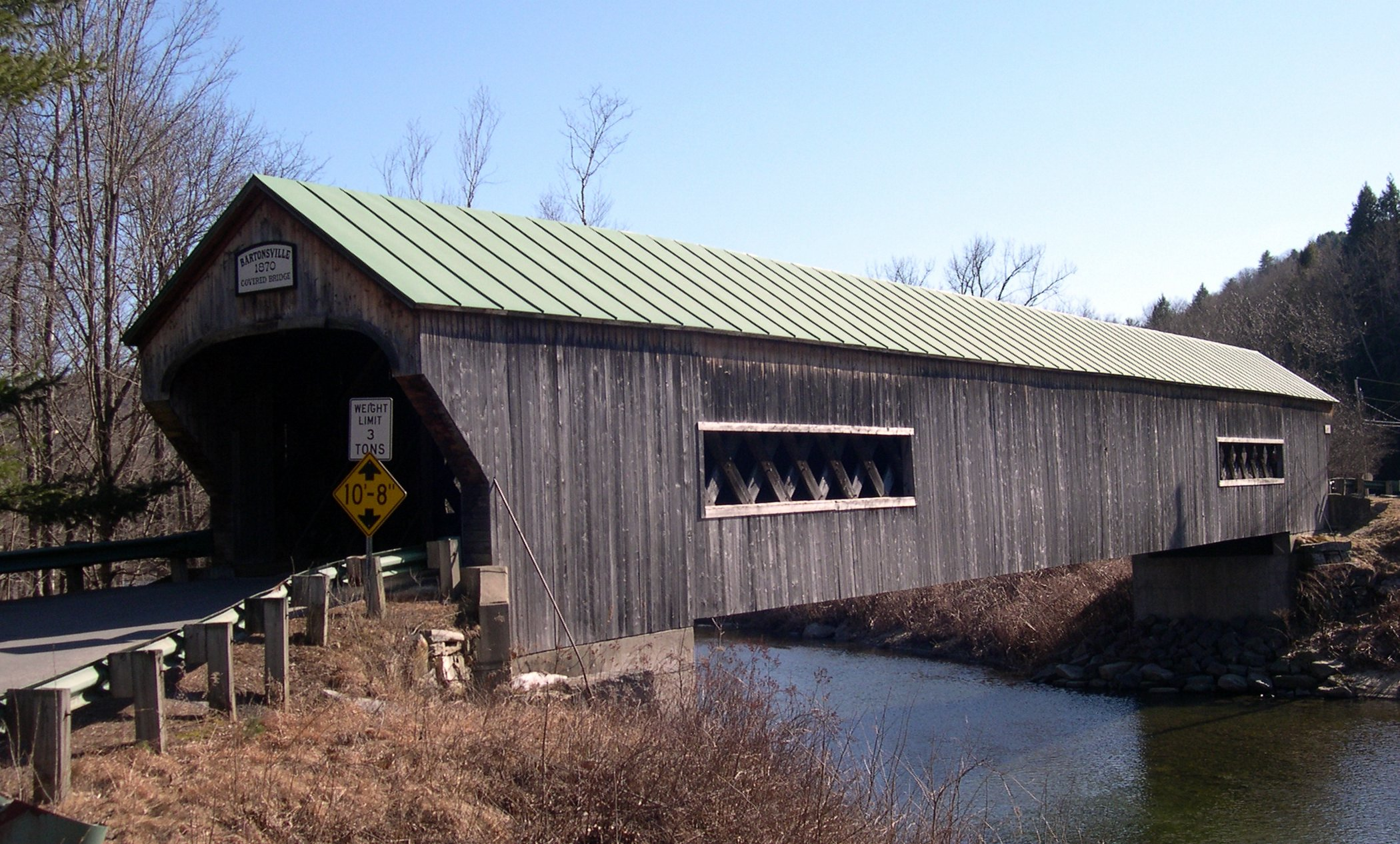
Bartonsville Covered Bridge could be seen on excursion trains from Riverside to Chester.

Throughout its tenure in Vermont, Steamtown provided several types of excursions, primarily in the summer and during the peak foliage season of the autumn. Occasionally, these trips would be lengthy, like one that ran from Boston to Montreal, or those that ran between Bellows Falls and Rutland, Vermont. Daily excursions ran from Riverside station in Bellows Falls to Chester depot. The cost of the trip, which in 1977 was $5.75 for an adult and $2.95 for a child, was combined with entrance into the museum, which was the grounds of Riverside station. The station was located about 2 miles (3 km) outside of town and on the bank of the Connecticut River. Newspaper travel writer Bill Rice described the 13-mile (21 km) trip from Riverside to Chester: "The trip to Chester affords a beautiful view of unspoiled Vermont countryside-covered bridges, vintage farms with grazing livestock and cornfield and a winding river with a deep gorge and picturesque waterfall." That was the Williams River, crossed by the railroad seven times. The waterfall was at Brockway Mills Gorge and was seen from a bridge 100 feet (30 m) above the gorge. Rice's article described Steamtown as the world's largest collection of steam locomotives.

In 1971, the Board of Health of Vermont issued an air-pollution waiver to the GMRC, enabling steam locomotives to pull excursions between Steamtown's Riverside station at Bellows Falls, and Chester depot. By 1976, Steamtown and GMRC were fighting over maintenance of the tracks, which were owned by the state of Vermont.

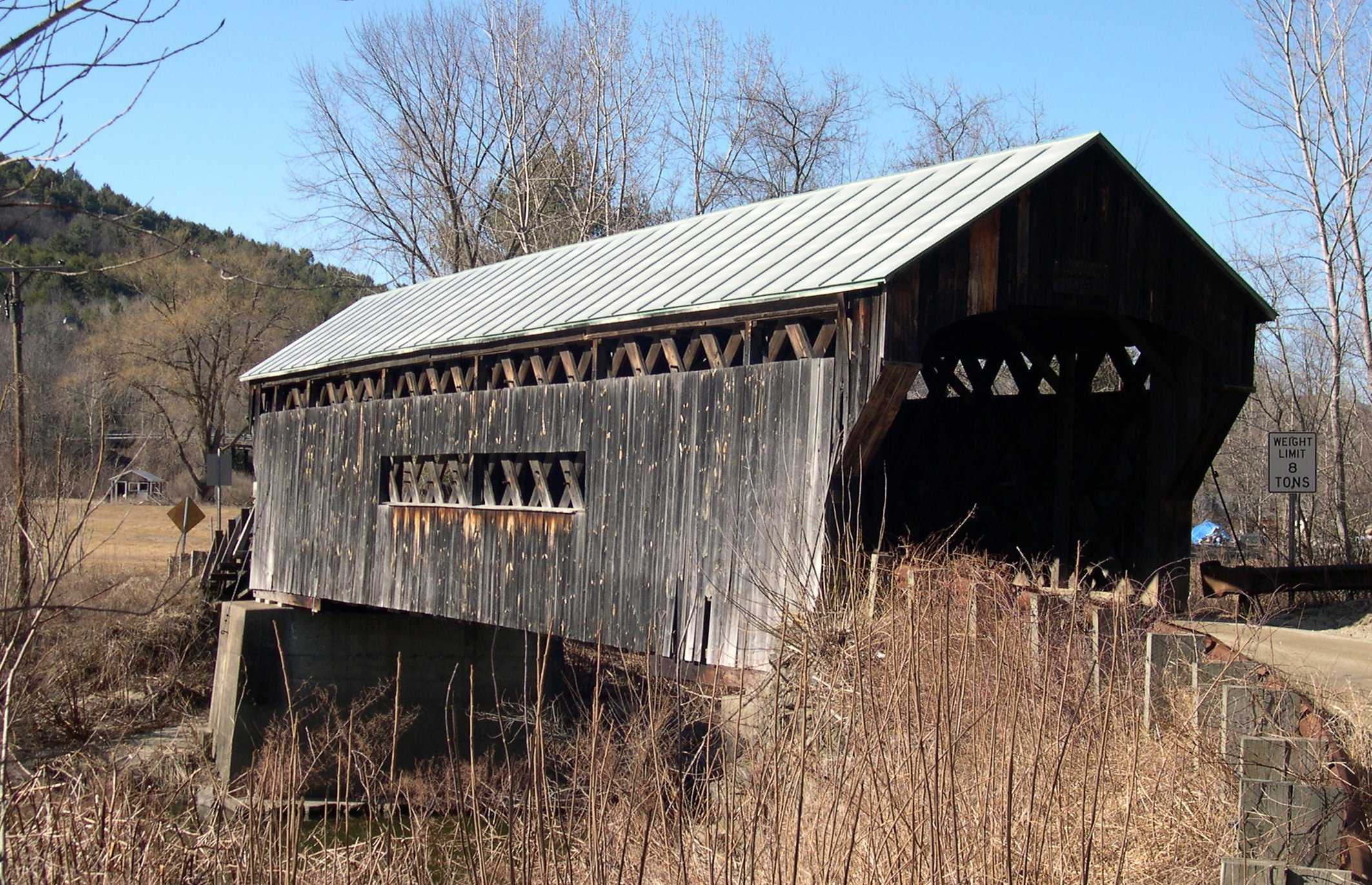
Worrall Covered Bridge could be seen on excursion trains from Riverside to Chester.

By 1978, the Steamtown Foundation had begun scouting for a new location for Steamtown, U.S.A. Orlando and perhaps other locations in Florida were under consideration. In 1980, Ray Holland, the chairman of the Board of Steamtown Foundation, resigned after accusing the board of incompetence. His resignation was followed by that of Robert Barbera, a long-time director of the board. In the year that followed, Steamtown did not run excursions. Don Ball Jr., had taken over direction of Steamtown by this time and discovered that the excursion train did not meet federal safety guidelines. In 1981, despite its vast holdings of vintage railroad stock, Steamtown, U.S.A. had only 17,000 visitors, while Connecticut's Essex Valley Railroad, which ran two small engines, had 139,000 visitors. Even in its best year, 1973, the Vermont location had attracted only 65,000 visitors.

Self-syndicated newspaper columnist Michael McManus once said that his goal in writing his weekly column was "to suggest answers to problems of the old industrial states." In March 1982 a substantial article by McManus appeared in the Bangor Daily News. In the article, McManus proposed several reasons why a city, like Chicago, Pittsburgh, or Scranton might find the addition of a tourist attraction like Steamtown beneficial. McManus went on to explain why the business was failing in Vermont. Among the reasons the article gave for poor attendance at the Vermont site were: past failed management, an isolated location and the lack of signs, owing to opposition by the state, on Interstate 91. In addition to these problems, the roof of the largest storage shed on the site collapsed under heavy snow the previous winter, damaging several pieces of equipment. Among the injured were the Canadian Pacific Railway No. 1293 and the Meadow River Lumber Company No. 1 Shay (shown in the infobox).

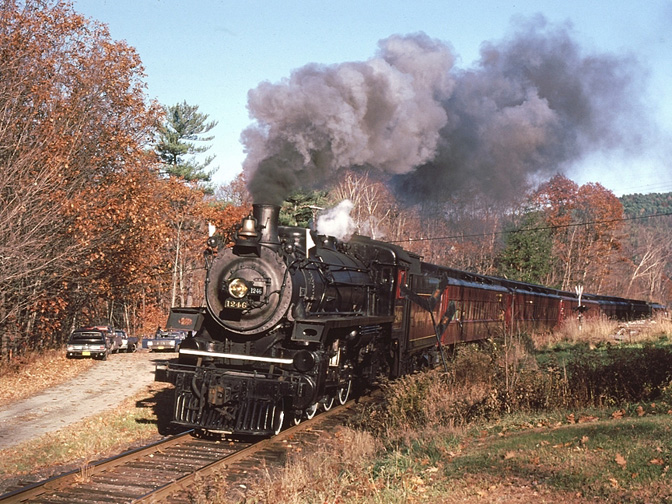
CPR 1246 at Brockway Mills, Vermont, October 24, 1981

When asked by McManus to describe the value of the Steamtown collection, Jim Boyd, editor of Railfan magazine said, "Everything there is no longer obtainable anywhere, whether it is the "Big Boy" Union Pacific No. 4012 or the Rahway Valley No. 15, a nice-sized locomotive any museum would give a right arm for. Most of the other large collections do not have any serviceable equipment." McManus closed his argument for moving Steamtown: "What is at stake is more than tourism and jobs. It is a significant part of America's past before the welder's torch is turned on the likes of the 1877 'Prince of Liege', the rare Union Pacific diamond stack, etc. The steel alone is worth $3 million."

In June 1983, McManus wrote about Steamtown again, this time announcing that Scranton had taken his suggestion. He said that other cities in contention were Springfield, Massachusetts, and Willimantic, Connecticut. "But on May 24, Scranton signed a contract to get it, pledging to raise $2 million to cover the cost of moving 40 ancient steam engines and 60 cars, few of which are operable, and to create a museum." Steamtown sponsored its last Vermont excursion on October 23, 1983, using Canadian Pacific 1246 to pull a "dozen or so cars" on a 100-mile (160 km) round trip from Riverside station to Ludlow, Vermont.

=== Steamtown in Scranton and nationalization ===
When Scranton agreed to take on Steamtown, U.S.A., it was estimated that the museum and excursion business would attract 200,000 to 400,000 visitors to the city every year. In anticipation of this economic boon, the city and a private developer spent $13 million to renovate the Delaware, Lackawanna and Western Railroad (DL&W) station and transform it into a Hilton hotel, at a time when the unemployment rate in the city was 13 percent.

Only 60,000 visitors showed up at Steamtown in 1987, and the 1988 excursions were canceled. After only three years, it was $2.2 million in debt and facing bankruptcy. Part of the problem was the cost of restoration of the new property and the deteriorating equipment. In addition, while the tourists in Vermont had enjoyed the sights of cornfields, farms, covered bridges, a waterfall and a gorge on a Steamtown excursion, the Scranton trip to Moscow, Pennsylvania, cut through one of the nation's largest junkyards, an eyesore described by Ralph Nader as "the eighth wonder of the world".

In 1986, the U.S. House of Representatives, under the urging of Scranton native Representative Joseph M. McDade, voted to approve the spending of $8 million to study the collection and to begin the process of making it a National Historic Site. By 1995, Steamtown was acquired and developed by the National Park Service (NPS) at a total cost of $66 million, and opened as Steamtown National Historic Site the same year.

In preparation for its acquisition of the collection, the NPS had conducted historical research during 1987 and 1988 on the equipment that still remained in the foundation's possession. This research was used for a Scope of Collections Statement for Steamtown National Historic Site and was published in 1991 under the title Steamtown Special History Study. Aside from providing concise histories of the equipment, the report also made recommendations as to whether or not each piece belonged in the now government-funded collection. Historical significance to the United States was a criterion of the recommendations. Many of the pieces of equipment that did not meet the report's recommendations were sold or traded for pieces that had historical significance to the DL&W grounds on which the site is located.

In 1989, six bridges along Steamtown's line to Moscow began to undergo restructuring, and to avoid cancelling their steam excursions, Steamtown, along with the Lackawanna County Rail Authority, contracted the New York, Susquehanna and Western Railway (NYS&W) to operate them over the Delaware and Hudson's (D&H) former DL&W main line between Scranton and Kingsley.

== The collection ==
Before its move to Scranton, Steamtown sold several pieces of the collection. After the facility was nationalized, several other pieces were sold or traded for pieces that were significant to the Scranton area. Some examples of the original collection are profiled below. In some cases, the pieces of equipment discussed here are still in the collection in Scranton, but several others are not. When possible the most recent information on the location of the equipment is provided.

=== In operation at Bellows Falls ===
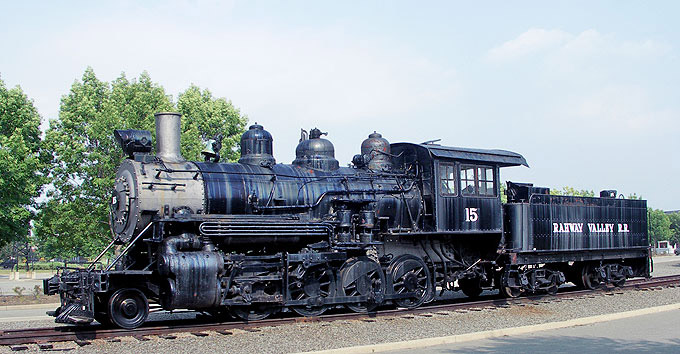
Baldwin Rahway Valley 15

Rahway Valley No. 15 was built by Baldwin Locomotive Works, June 1916. It is a 2-8-0 Consolidation type locomotive. It was built for the Oneida & Western Railroad and wore the number 20 for that company. The railroad's initial purpose was to develop Tennessee's coal and lumber industry, but it became a short line that connected the Cincinnati, New Orleans and the Texas Pacific Railways between Oneida and Jamestown, Tennessee.

In the mid-1930s the engine was purchased by Rahway Valley Railroad in New Jersey. Renumbered 15, the locomotive served primarily while the company's other locomotives were being serviced. The locomotive was the favorite of master mechanic Charles Nees. "Perhaps not the most efficient engine, Rahway Valley No. 15 qualified as the line's most attractive." When it was retired in 1953, having been replaced with diesel power, No. 15 was put into well-protected storage until it was purchased by F. Nelson Blount in 1959.

Blount used No. 15 first for a static display at Pleasure Island, and then for excursions in New Hampshire and Vermont from 1962 to 1967. It was used again at Steamtown, in 1973, when it blew a flue while heading a triple header excursion from Riverside. The incident left veteran engineer Andy Barbera scalded and No. 15 in need of repair. Since the services of the locomotive were not needed at the time, the repairs were not done and remained undone by the time the Steamtown Special History was written. While in Blount's possession, the locomotive appeared in the movie The Cardinal (1963). The Steamtown Special History Study recommended that the engine be cosmetically and operationally restored, as it had served in the northeastern quarter of the United States and had been serviced, at least once, at the Lackawanna's Scranton shop. As of today, the locomotive is still displayed at Steamtown National Historic Site.

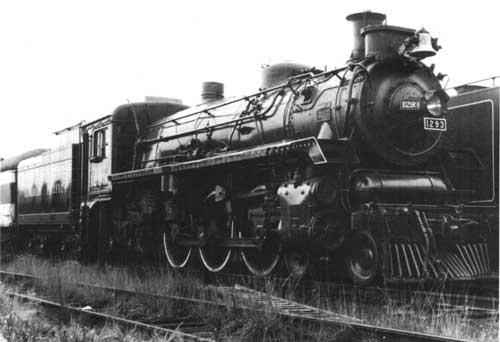
Canadian Pacific 1293

Canadian Pacific Railway No. 1293 was built in 1948 by Canadian Locomotive Company. It was retired after only eight years of service when diesel power made it obsolete. This was one of three type 4-6-2, class G5d light-weight "Pacific" model locomotives that were operational at the time that Steamtown was in Bellows Falls. The Steamtown Special History Study gave no details of the operational career of 1293, but said that Blount purchased it under the name of Green Mountain Railroad, in January 1964. The Steamtown Foundation purchased the locomotive from Green Mountain Railroad in 1973 and rebuilt it in 1976. Making its debut as an excursion train in June of that year and sporting a green and black color scheme, 1293 served the state of Vermont as its "Bicentennial Train", logging 13,000 miles (21,000 km). Leased by the state of Vermont for 80-mile (100 km) excursions that were scheduled for the entire year, the engine was dubbed "The Spirit of Ethan Allen". In 1979, the locomotive was renumbered "1881", painted black with silver stripes, and leased to a Hollywood company for use in the filming of the horror movie Terror Train (1979), starring Jamie Lee Curtis. In 1980, the locomotive was repainted with a color scheme used by Canadian Pacific in the 1930s. The black, gold, and Tuscan red paint job was popular with railroad enthusiasts and photographers. The number 1293 was also restored to the engine. In February 1982, the headlights, handrails, and cab roof of 1293 were damaged when the roof of a Steamtown storage building gave way to heavy snow.

Although the Steamtown Special History Study reasoned that, since this type of locomotive had historically operated in New England, perhaps as far south as Boston, it qualified to be part of the federal government's collection, the Canadian native sat unused for 12 years following the move to Scranton. Ohio Central Railroad System purchased it in 1996, and it underwent a 13-month restoration. By July of 2010, Ohio Central Railroad has lost control of most of its holdings, but former owner, Jerry Joe Jacobson, maintained a collection of vintage equipment including CPR 1293 and her sister, CPR 1278, which is also a veteran of Steamtown, U.S.A. operational locomotives. No. 1293 is still operational as of today.

Canadian Pacific Railway No. 1278, like her sister, CPR 1293, was also built by Canadian Locomotive Company in 1948, and is a type 4-6-2, class G5d light-weight "Pacific" locomotive. It was purchased by Blount in May 1965, and renumbered 127. Blount had planned to renumber all three of the series 1200 CRP locomotives in his collection from 1246, 1278, and 1293 to 124, 127 and 129 respectively, but 1278 was the only one of the three that underwent the change. The new number remained on the locomotive from 1966 until 1973, when its former number was restored. The locomotive was leased to the Cadillac and Lake City Railroad in Michigan from 1970 to 1971. After some repair work, the locomotive was returned to Bellows Falls where it served on excursion runs. After moving to Scranton, CPR 1278 was traded to the Gettysburg Steam Railroad in Pennsylvania. Shortly after 7 p.m. Friday, June 16, 1995, an explosion in the firebox of CPR 1278 burned three members of its crew. One man, James Cornell, the son of the owner of the engine, was critically injured. The train that the locomotive was pulling had 310 passengers on board. None of the passengers, who were taking the "Summer Eve Dinner Excursion" to Mount Holly Springs, were hurt. An investigation done by the National Transportation Safety Board determined that the accident was caused by poor maintenance and operator training. The board also pointed out that the Canadian design of the firebox may have prevented further injuries and perhaps deaths. Jerry Jacobson, the owner of the Ohio Central Railroad (OCR), bought the engine at an auction in 1998. After Jacobson sold the OCR, in 2008, he maintained ownership of the locomotive. Nowadays, 1278 is stored at Jacobson's facility, the Age of Steam Roundhouse, in Sugarcreek, Ohio.

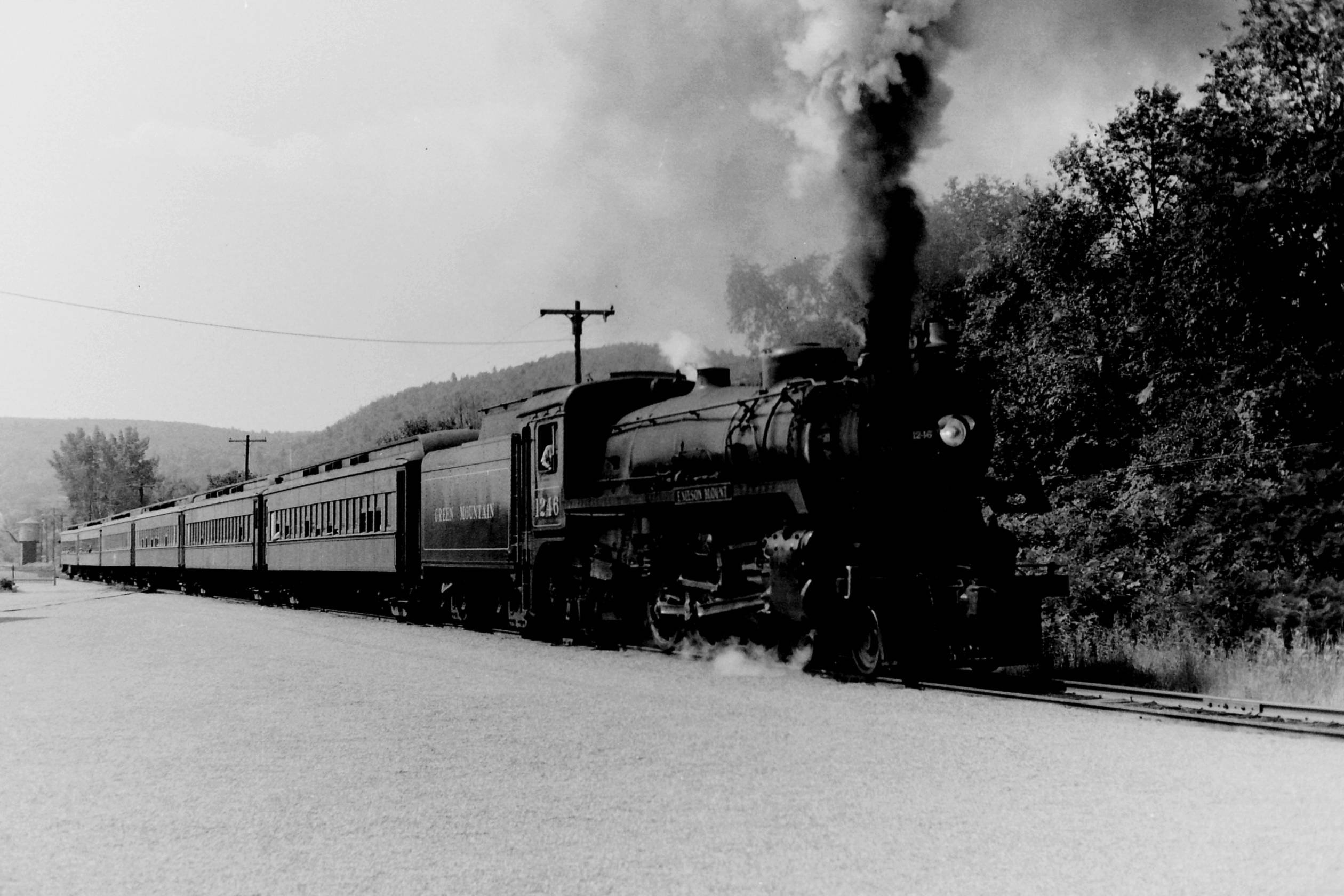
Canadian Pacific 1246 in August 1970

Canadian Pacific Railway No. 1246 was the third of the 1200 series Canadian Pacific locomotives in the collection. In the fall of 1983, Steamtown said "farewell to Vermont" by offering two 100-mile (160 km) excursions "through a landscape of covered bridges, rushing streams and scenic countryside". The train, which had the capacity of 800–1000 passengers, was to be pulled by CPR 1246. Built in 1946, CPR 1246 is a 4-6-2 type locomotive. After operating in Steamtown in Scranton between 1984 and 1986, it was determined that 1246 was inadequate for service as it was "too light for the heavy grades and sharp curves of the Steamtown line". The National Park Service sold it to the Connecticut Valley Railroad Museum, in 1988. This locomotive was on static display from 1996 to 2008, at the Valley Railroad in Essex, Connecticut. In 2008, it was moved to the Naugatuck Railroad which is operated by the Railroad Museum of New England, Thomaston, Connecticut.

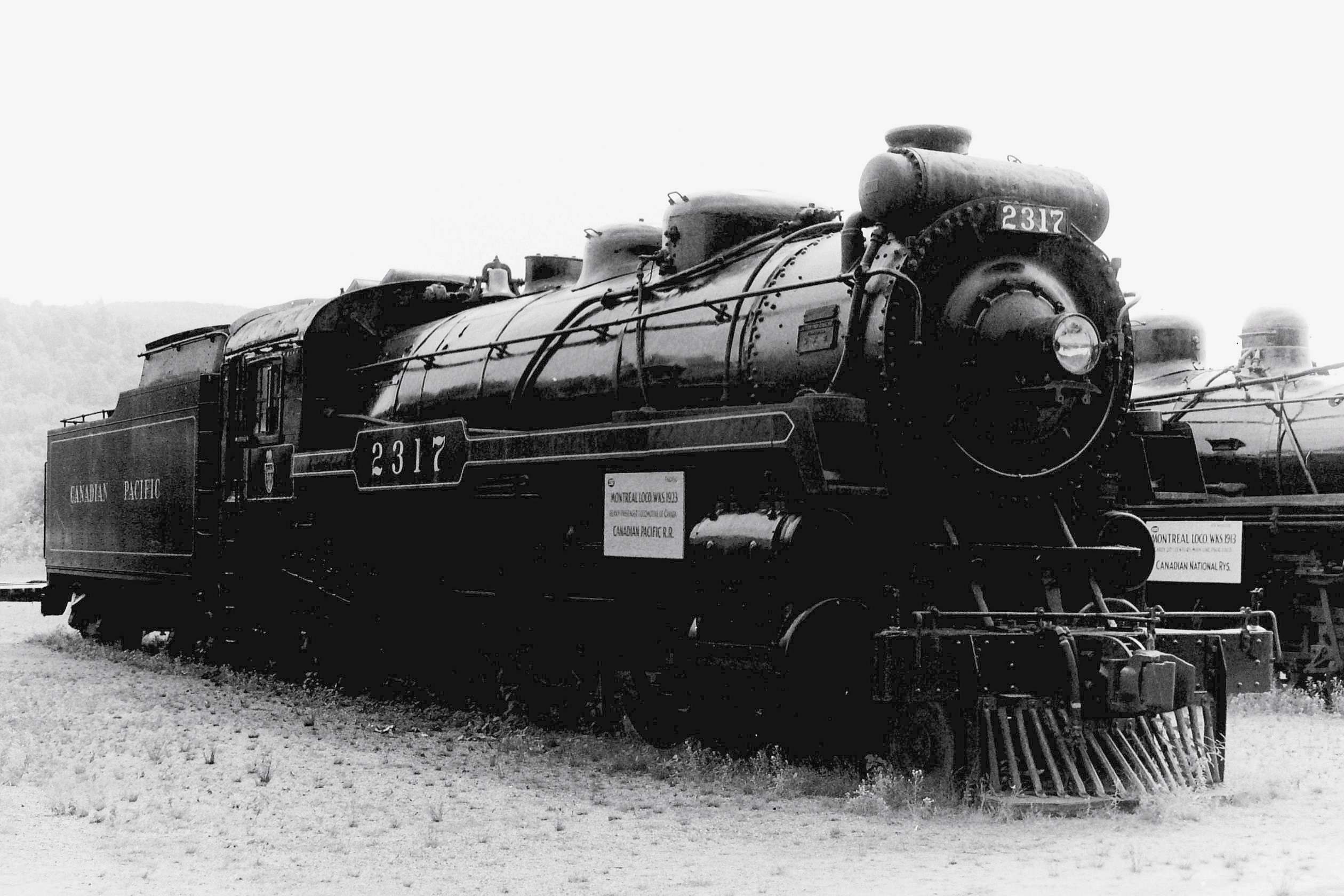
No. 2317 on static display at Steamtown U.S.A. in Bellows Falls, Vermont, August 1970

Canadian Pacific Railway No. 2317 is G-3c class 4-6-2 "Pacific" type steam locomotive, built in June 1923 by the Montreal Locomotive Works for the Canadian Pacific Railway. It was acquired by F. Nelson Blount in November 1965 and moved it to Bellows Falls, Vermont, where the locomotive was added to Blount's collection. In March 1976, Steamtown crews began restoration on No. 2317 with the hopes of bringing it back to service as quickly as possible, since a locomotive was needed to pull a bicentennial train known as the Vermont Bicentennial Steam Expedition, sponsored by the State of Vermont. Due to weight restrictions on some wooden bridges the train meant to run on, restoration work on No. 2317 was halted, and CP No. 1293 was selected to pull the train, instead. On October 1, 1978, the locomotive was fired up for the first time in nineteen years, and it joined CP Nos. 1293 and 1246 in Steamtown's operating fleet. As of 2026, the locomotive is on static display at Steamtown National Historic Site.

== Other pieces of the Blount collection ==
=== Union Pacific 4012 ===
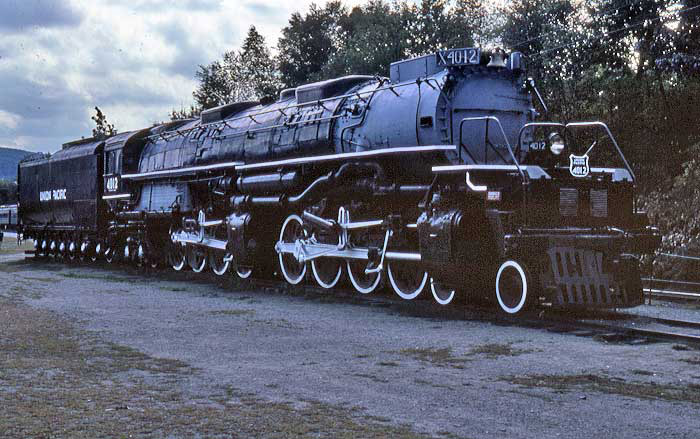
Union Pacific "Big Boy" No. 4012, on display at Steamtown U.S.A., Bellows Falls, Vermont

"Big Boy", a 4-8-8-4 type locomotive built by American Locomotive Company in November 1941, is among the world's largest steam locomotives and weighs 1,250,000 pounds (570,000 kg). The Steamtown Special History Study recommended that 4012 would remain at Steamtown as it is the only articulated type in the collection. It also recommended that it remain on static display, as it was doubtful that the "track, switches, culverts, trestles, bridges, wyes, turntables, and other facilities that would have to carry her [could] bear her great weight". In fact, since the Steamtown turntable and roundhouse were inadequate for its size, Big Boy 4012 has remained out-of-doors since its arrival at Scranton, where it was still on display as of today. From 2019 to 2021, the locomotive went under cosmetic restoration. Aside from 4012, 7 more Union Pacific Big Boys Survive: 4004 is at Holiday Park in Cheyenne Wyoming, 4005 is at the James Donovan Forney Transportation Museum in Denver Colorado, 4006 is at the National Museum of Transportation in Kirkwood Missouri, 4017 is at the National Railroad Museum in Green Bay Wisconsin, 4018 is at the Museum of the American Railroads in Frisco Texas, & 4023 is at Kennefick Park in Omaha Nebraska, while another Big Boy: number 4014, used to be on display at the Railgiants Train Museum at Fairplex in Pomona California, & since 2019 the 4014 was restored to operating condition making it the new largest active steam engine in the world, that overtook 4-6-6-4 "Challenger" 3985 from 1981 to 2010.

=== Meadow River Lumber Company No. 1 ===
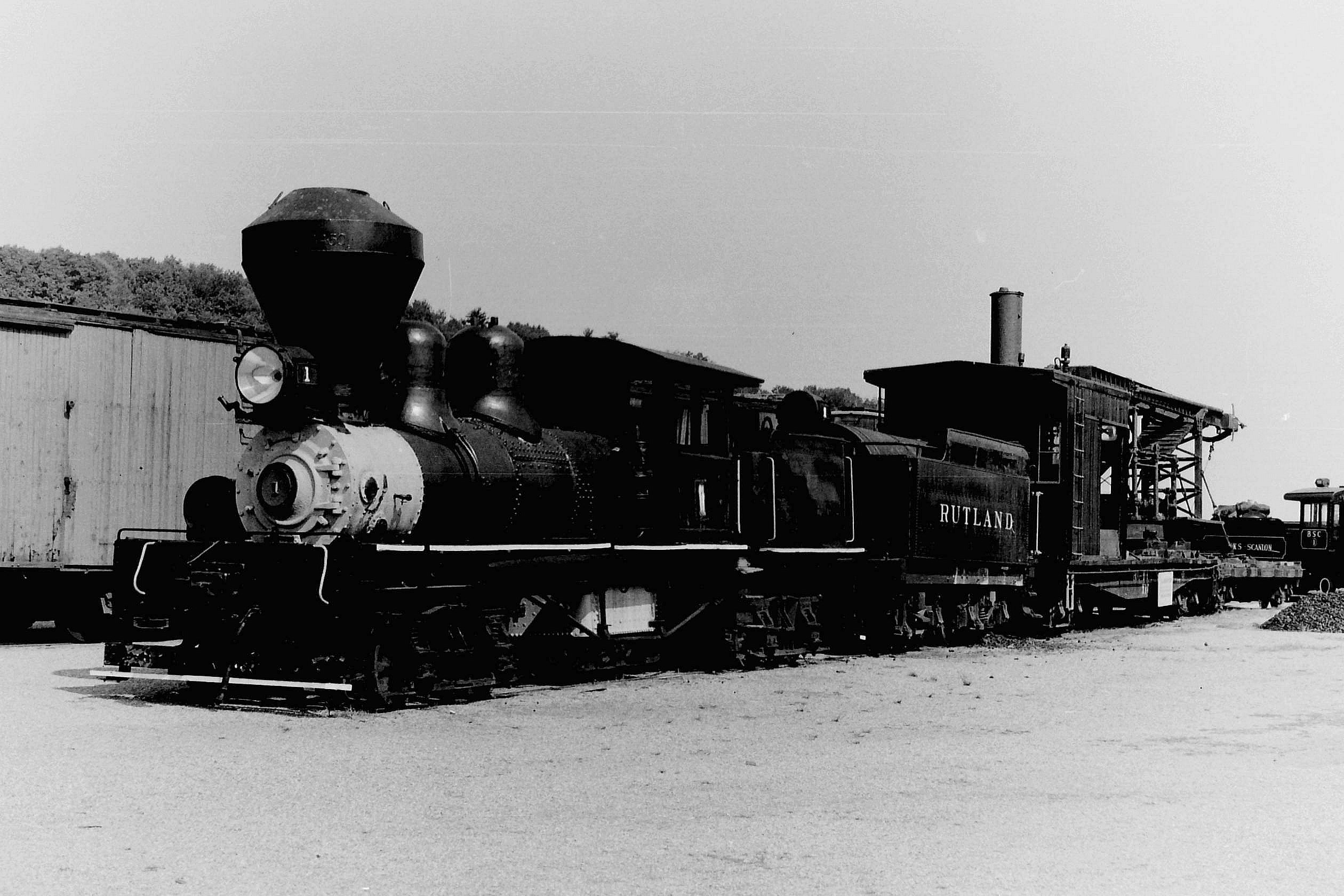
Meadow River Lumber Co. No. 1 in August 1970

While at Steamtown, the Shay locomotive endured extensive damage when the building it was stored in collapsed under heavy snow in February 1982. The Shay's wooden cab was destroyed, but "its sand dome, its headlight, its front number plate, its bell and bell hanger, whistle, and other components" were missing before this incident. It was determined that it would remain at the National Historic Site as it was the only Shay and the only geared locomotive in the collection.

=== Bevier & Southern Railroad No. 109 ===
Bevier & Southern Railroad No. 109 was built by Brooks in 1900. This 2-6-0 type locomotive served the Illinois Central Railroad under several numbers: 560, 3706 and 3719. As of July 2010 it is located at the Illinois Railway Museum in Union and referred to as Illinois Central 3719.

=== Illinois Central No. 790 ===
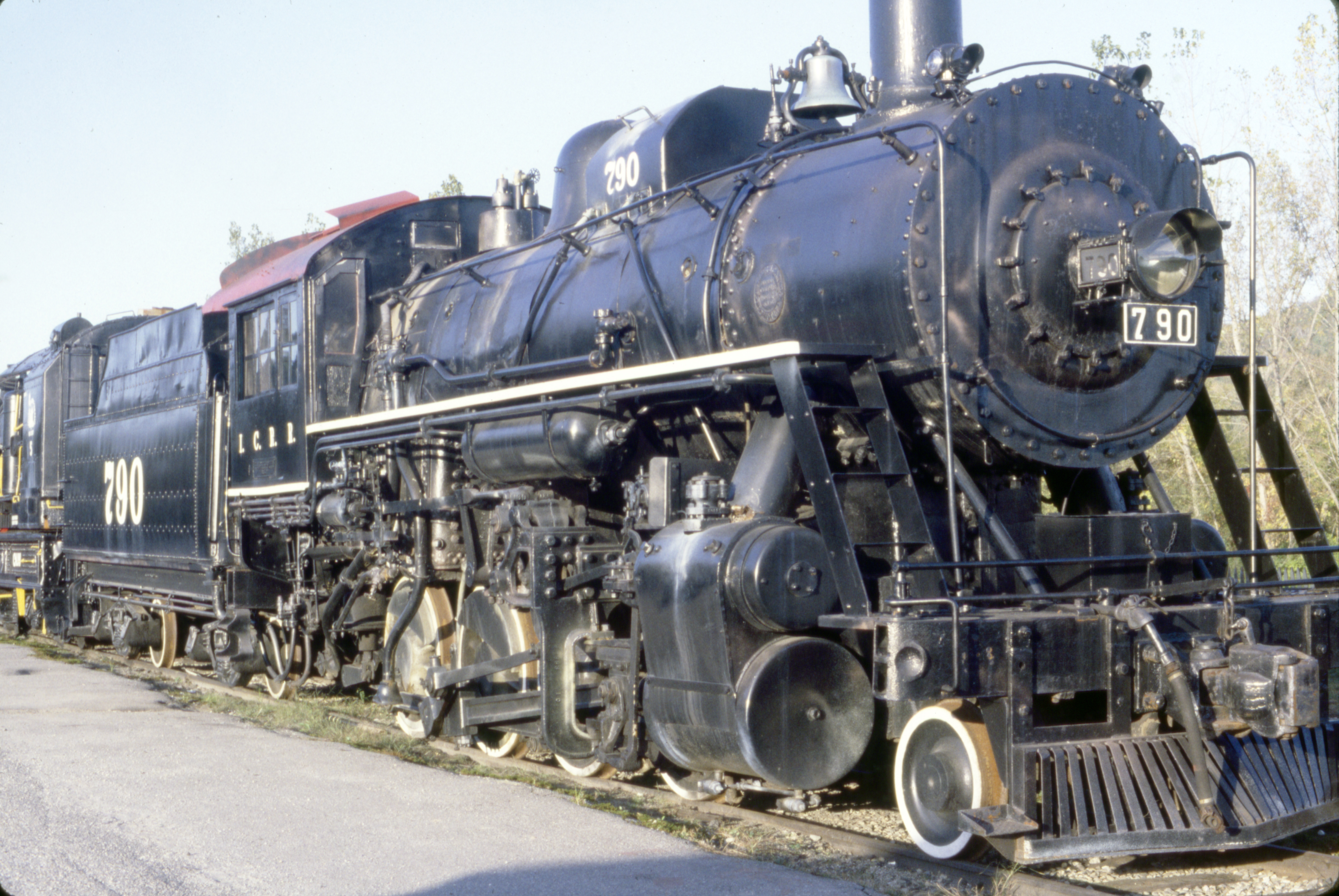
Illinois Central No. 790 At Steamtown, Bellows Falls, Vermont, October 1983

This locomotive was built in 1903 by American Locomotive Company as a 2-8-0 Consolidation type. It was originally owned by Chicago Union Transfer Railway and numbered 100. It was sold to Illinois Central Railroad Company in 1904 and renumbered 641. The railroad, which dated back to 1851, operated 4,265 miles (6,864 km) of track between Chicago, Illinois and New Orleans, Louisiana. This locomotive pulled heavy freight in Tennessee and "must have seen hard service, for reportedly the Illinois Central rebuilt it in 1918, modernizing it with a superheater, and possibly replacing the boiler and firebox".

In 1943 it was renumber 790 and remained in service until it was replaced by diesel-electric locomotives and put into storage, "the railroad nevertheless had to fire No. 790 up in the spring to assist Illinois Central trains through track inundated by flood waters near Cedar Rapids, because diesel-electric locomotives with their electric motors shorted out in any water, whereas even the bottom of the firebox in a steam locomotive was much higher above the rail, hence above flood waters." It was sold to Louis S. Keller of Cedar Rapids, Iowa, in 1959 who had hoped to use it for excursions. It was used for "flood duty" in April 1965 at the Clinton Corn Processing Company "where it plowed through overflow from the Mississippi River." Later that year it was sold to David de Camp who planned to use it in the area of Lake Placid, New York. The plans were not met and it was sold to F. Nelson Blount in January 1966.

The only surviving locomotive of the Chicago Union Transfer Railway, No. 790 is the only Illinois Central 2-8-0 Consolidation type of its class to survive. "About 146 standard gauge 2-8-0s survive in the United States, including Illinois Central No. 790". The Steamtown National Historic Site retained this locomotive on the suggestion of the Steamtown Special History Study.

=== Brooks-Scanlon Corporation No. 1 ===
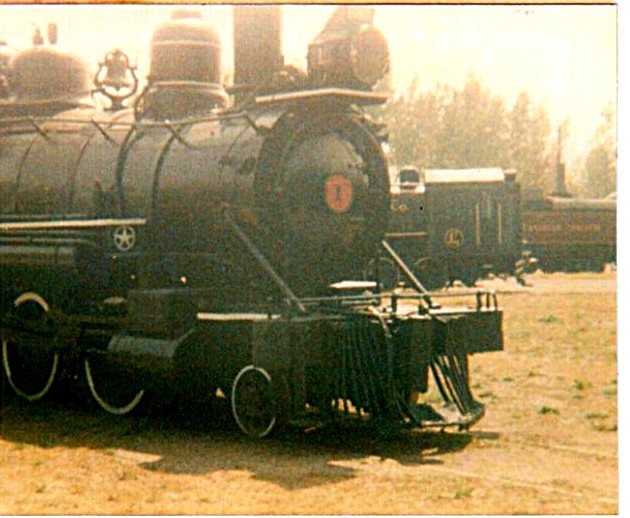
Brooks-Scanlon Corporation Locomotive No.1 on static display at Steamtown, U.S.A., Bellows Falls, Vermont, c. 1974

No. 1 was once part of the Steamtown, U.S.A. collection. This type of locomotive was originally developed for use on the flat terrain of the prairie, such as the Great Plains of Kansas and surrounding states, and thus it was referred to as a Prairie-type locomotive. The Prairie locomotives were later used by lumber companies which operated on flat forest terrain. This locomotive was built specifically for the lumber industry and served several lumber firms in Florida.

The Carpenter-O'Brien Lumber Company was incorporated in Delaware in 1913. The company, which operated in Florida, ordered this locomotive from Baldwin Locomotive Works, which completed it in 1914. Locomotive No. 1 was put into service at the company's Eastport sawmill in Florida. The locomotive, which could burn either coal or wood, was likely originally outfitted with a Rushton, or cabbage cinder catching stack. "If so, a later owner apparently replaced the Rushton stack with the 'shotgun' stack now on the locomotive."

After the United States entered World War I in 1917, the Carpenter-O'Brien Lumber Company was sold to Brooks-Scanlon Corporation. By 1928, Brooks-Scanlon was operating in four Florida counties and producing 100,000,000 board feet (200,000 m^{3}) of lumber. This locomotive was probably used to haul logs into the mill from the woods or to switch the yard around the Eastport plant, or both. In the following years the locomotive changed hands four of five times between several interconnected Florida lumber firms.

In 1959, locomotive No.1 was taken out of service by its then owner, Lee Tidewater Cypress, in Perry, Florida. It was sold to F. Nelson Blount in 1962 by the Lee Tidewater Cypress parent company, J.C. Turner Company. It was moved to Walpole, New Hampshire and then, across the Connecticut River, to Bellows Falls, Vermont where it stayed until the Blount collection was relocated to Scranton, Pennsylvania.

=== Simons Wrecking Company No. 2 ===
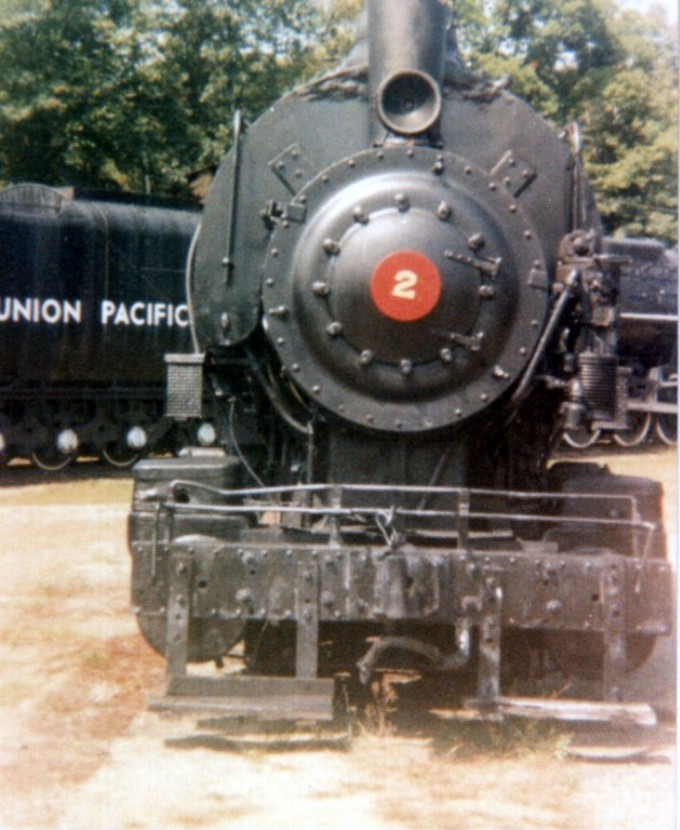
SWCL No. 2 on Static display at Steamtown, U.S.A., Bellows Falls, Vermont, c. 1974

Simons Wrecking Company No. 2 is an H.K. Porter, 0-6-0T steam engine built in 1941. The tank engine, which is oil fired, worked for the US Navy during World War II in Virginia as #14. Later the engine was put into service with Simons Wrecking Co. as No. 2.

Once part of Blount's Steamtown collection, Locomotive #2 was sold before Steamtown moved to Scranton, and languished for many years in an auto salvage yard in Newbury, Massachusetts. In 2006, the engine was removed from the junkyard by Peabody, Massachusetts Public Works Director Dick Carnevale, and restoration began in hopes for it to be displayed in a city park in Peabody. The restoration of the engine was done by Carnevale personally, along with some volunteers. After he resigned in October 2008, the city gave him 60 days to remove the engine from city property. Local residents contacted the Friends of Valley Railroad in Essex, Connecticut, who purchased the engine from Carnevale and transported it to Connecticut where, as of today, the locomotive is on display at Essex Steam Train and Riverboat.

=== Canadian National Railways No. 1551 ===
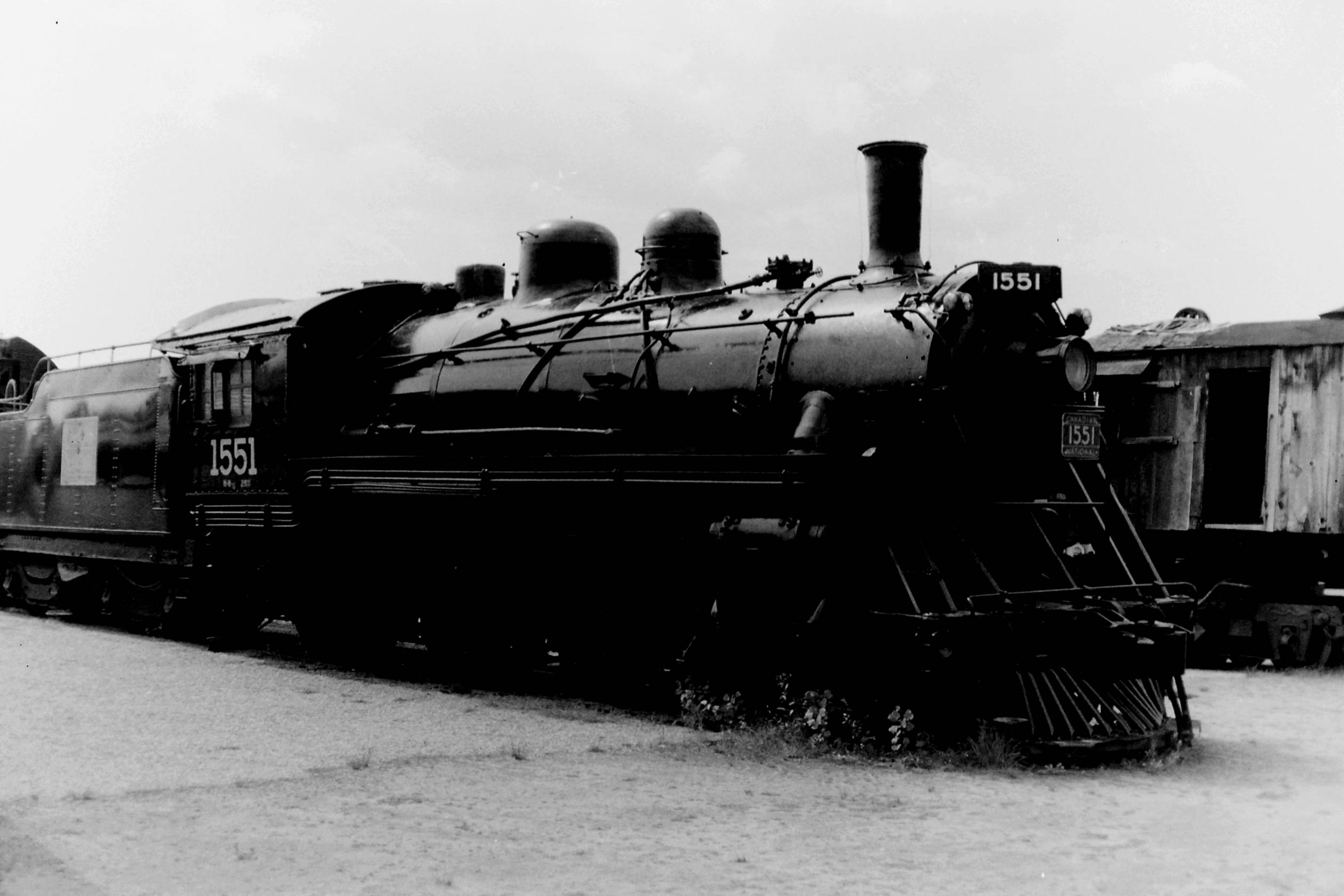
CN 1551 on display, August 1970

Canadian National No. 1551 is a 4-6-0 type locomotive, was built by Montreal Locomotive Works, March 1912, and originally was numbered 1354 for the Canadian Northern Railway. Used primarily on Canadian commuter lines, the locomotive was renumbered 1551 in October 1956 and retired in 1958. Blount bought the engine in 1961 and restoration was begun, but never completed. In 1986, Jerry Joe Jacobson traded a 1929 Baldwin Locomotive Works built shop switcher, Iron and Steel Company No. 3, 0-6-0, for No. 1551. It was restored and ran excursions for the Ohio Central Railroad until Jacobson lost control of the railroad in 2008. Jacobson still owns the locomotive. It is stored at Jacobson's "Age of Steam Roundhouse" in Sugar Creek Ohio.

=== Canadian National Railways No. 96 ===
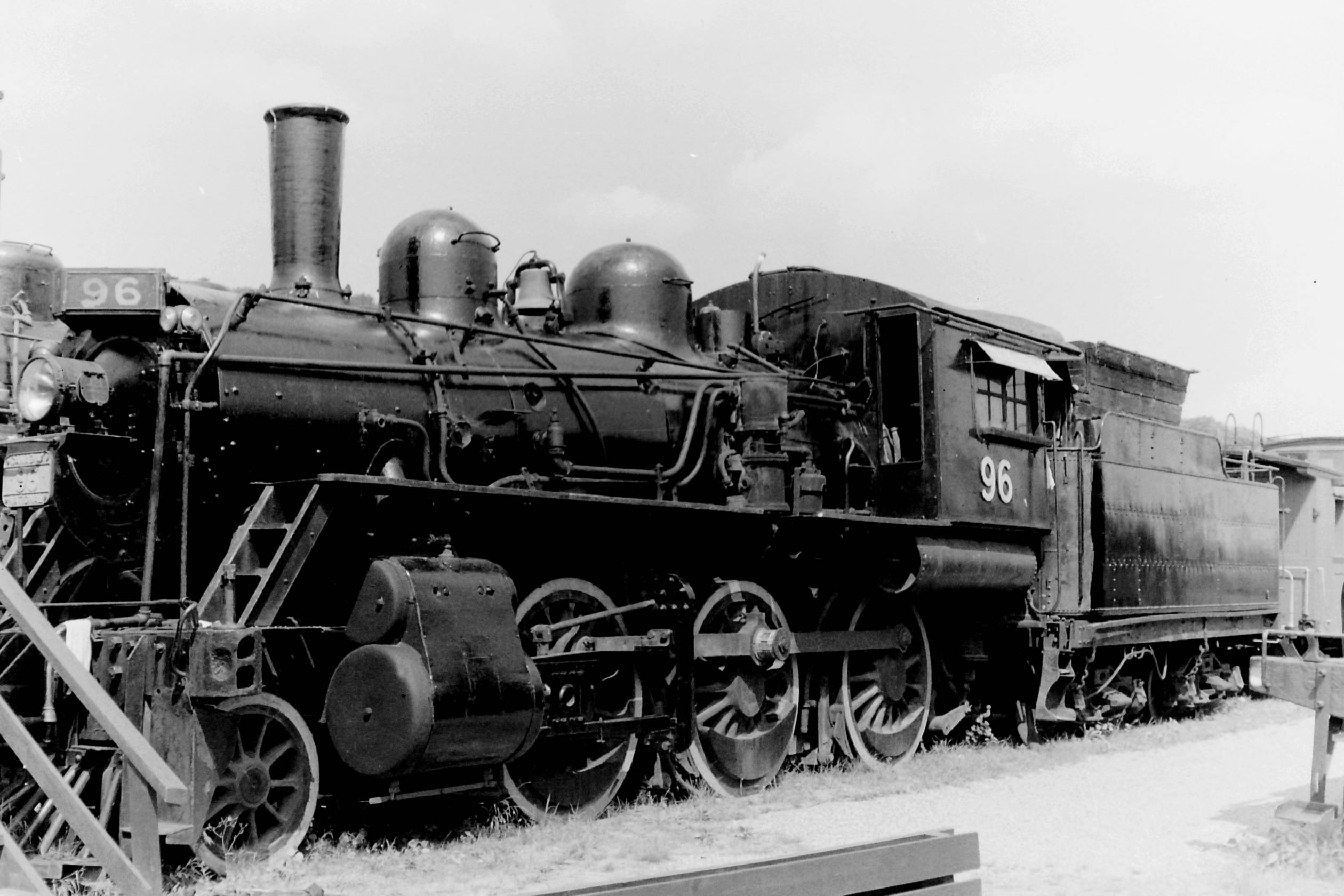
CN 96 in August 1970

Canadian National Railways No. 96, 2-6-0 Mogul type, is also owned by Jerry Joe Jacobson. It was built in 1910 by the Canadian Locomotive Company and originally numbered 1024 for the Grand Trunk Railway, then 926 when Canadian National obtained it in a merger in 1923, CN renumbered it 96 in 1951. It was sold to Blount in June 1959. While owned by Blount, the locomotive was used for its parts to keep sister Canadian National 89 (also part of Steamtown at the time) operational. It was sold in the 1980s and went to Ontario. It was purchased by Jacobson in 1994 and as of today, is stored out of service and number 96 remains on display at the Age of Steam Roundhouse in Sugar Creek Ohio.

=== Southern Railway No. 926; Repton ===
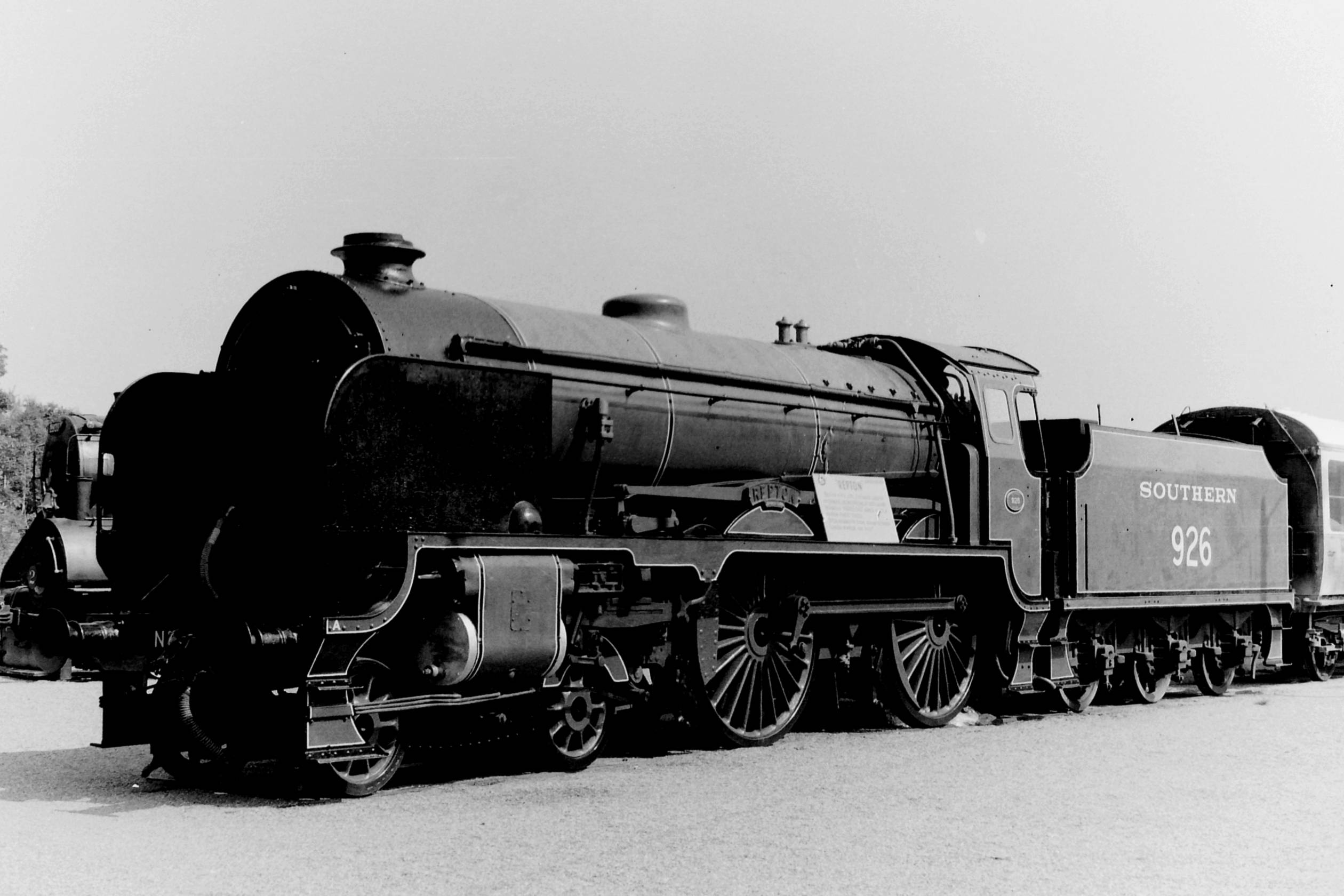
Repton on display in August 1970

Southern Railway No. 926 is a V Class "Schools class" 4-4-0 type locomotive, one of 40 named after British public schools. It is one of three Schools class locomotives to survive the onset of diesel power. It was completed in May 1934 and entered service on the Bournemouth route, with some time operating between Waterloo and Portsmouth before that line was electrified. It was one of the last of the class to be overhauled by British Railways in 1960, so was considered a good choice for preservation. In December 1962 the engine was withdrawn from service. In 1963, it was optioned for purchase by New York City businessman Edgar Mead, on behalf of the Empire State Railway Museum in Middletown, New York, and stored at Fratton.

Repton was ultimately acquired by Steamtown, along with LSWR M7 Class No. 53. It was cosmetically overhauled at Eastleigh Works in 1966, before moving to America the following year. It was then formally handed over to Steamtown, who in the 1970s loaned the engine to the Cape Breton Steam Railway in Canada, where it operated a regular passenger service. It also operated at Scranton following Steamtown's relocation there. In 1989, it was sold again, and returned to the United Kingdom to the North Yorkshire Moors Railway (NYMR), where it was again overhauled and found to be in good condition. As of 2019 it remains in service on the NYMR.

=== Canadian Pacific Railway No. 2816 ===
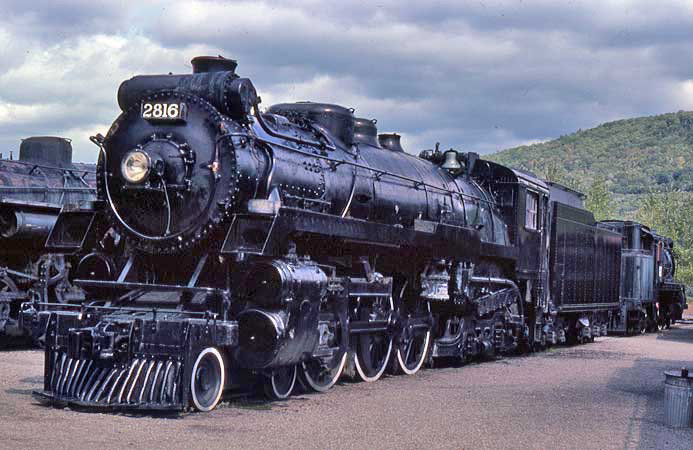
Canadian Pacific 2816 on static display at Steamtown, U.S.A., Bellows Falls, Vermont

Canadian Pacific Railway No. 2816 was acquired by Blount in January 1964. It was built by Montreal Locomotive Works in 1930. The 4-6-4 Hudson, H1b class locomotive had logged over 2,000,000 miles (3,200,000 km) in 30 years of service pulling passenger trains between Winnipeg and Calgary, and Winnipeg and Fort William, Ontario. Later, 2816 served on the Windsor-to-Quebec City corridor. The locomotive's final run was on May 26, 1960, pulling a Montreal–Rigaud commuter train. The Steamtown Special History Study recommended that the locomotive be kept in the collection, as it was the only 4-6-4 in the group, but the National Park Service sold it back to Canadian Pacific Railway, who restored it and put it back into service.

In 1998, the Steamtown National Historic Site, which is funded by the federal government, began divesting itself of foreign equipment, including CPR 2816. Canadian Pacific Railway acquired it and undertook a 3-year, $1 million restoration which included converting it from coal-burning to oil. In 2001, renamed the "Empress", 2816 was used for pricy excursions between Calgary and Vancouver, British Columbia. After taking a year off in 2009, the Empress went on tour in 2010 offering rides to the general public across Canada. CPR donated the ticket proceeds to the Children's Wish Foundation. In 2024, the locomotive toured from Calgary to Mexico City for the Final Spike Steam Tour to mark one year since CP Rail purchased the Kansas City Southern to form the CPKC.

=== Bullard Company No. 2 ===
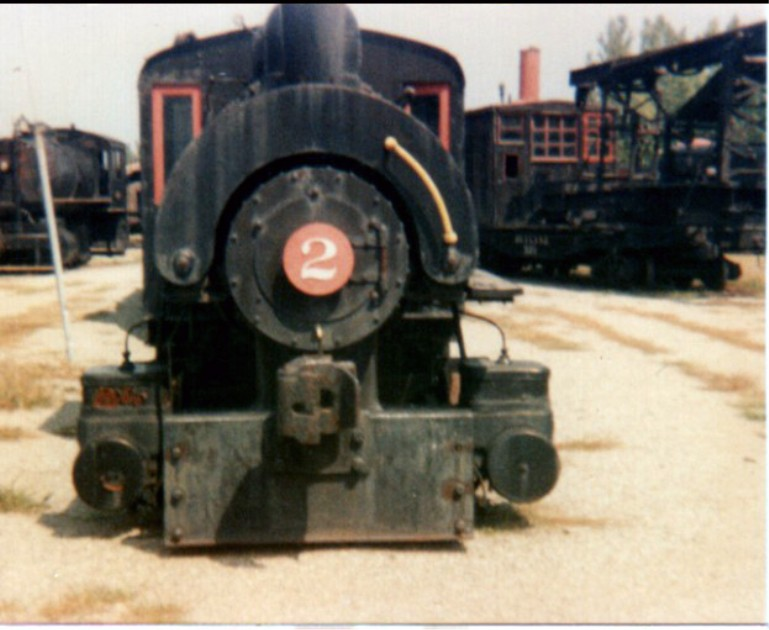
Bullard Co. No. 2, at Steamtown, U.S.A., Bellows Falls, Vermont, c. 1974

Bullard Company No. 2 is a small tank locomotive built by H.K. Porter Company for the Bullard Company, October 1937. It is on display at Steamtown National Historic Site, as of September 2010. According to the Steamtown Special History Study, this locomotive was used to switched cars around the Bullard tool plant in Bridgeport, Connecticut, for about 15 or 20 years before acquisition by Steamtown. The Bullard Company sold it to a used locomotive dealer, the American Machinery Corporation of Bridgeport, Connecticut, probably in the late 1950s or early 1960s. It was purchased by Blount in June 1963. The SSHS also said that a catalog, believed to be the one the Bullard Company used to order the locomotive, was in the possession of the SNHS at the time the report was written.

=== Union Pacific Railway No. 737 ===
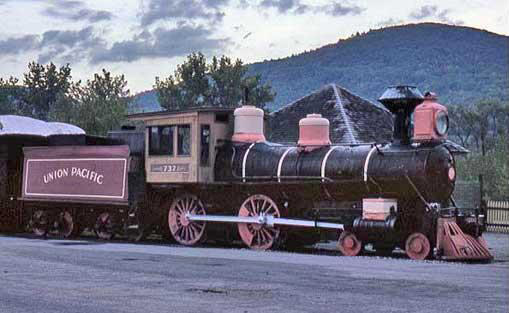
Union Pacific 737 on display at Steamtown, U.S.A., Bellows Falls, Vermont

Union Pacific No. 737, a 4-4-0 "American", was built by Baldwin Locomotive Works in 1887. The oldest locomotive in the collection to have operated in the United States, it is the "oldest genuine Union Pacific in existence and the only Union Pacific 4-4-0 in existence". At the time it was built it was the most common type of locomotive used for both passenger and freight trains in the United States and was therefore referred to as the "American Standard" or "American". In 1904 the locomotive was sold to the Southern Pacific Company where its number was changed to 246 and then to 216. It was retired from service on mainline railroads and put to use in industry in 1929. The locomotive operated as 216 for the Erath Sugar Company and the Vermillion Sugar Company. It was retired by the latter company in 1956 and acquired by Blount in 1957. Originally the locomotive had a "diamond" smoke stack. It is unknown when that was changed to a straight "shotgun" stack. Sometime during the early 20th century the locomotive was converted from coal burning to oil burning and its wooden "cowcatcher" pilot was replaced with a steel pipe pilot. The wooden cab was replaced with an all-steel cab, and its kerosene "box" headlamp was replaced with an electric one. When the engine was relocated from Louisiana to Vermont its steel cab roof was removed in preparation for the ride on a flat car. The roof was later mistaken for scrap metal as a worker at Steamtown cut out a piece for use as a stack cover for the locomotive. In 1970 the train underwent what the Steamtown Historical Study refers to as a "misguided" restoration, and given a diamond-shaped smoke stack and a kerosene "box" headlamp, both of which bearing very little resemblance to the stack and headlamp originally worn by the engine. The restoration thus gave the engine an appearance unlike any form it had assumed during its service life.

The Steamtown collection gave the engine to the Nevada Southern Railroad Museum at Boulder City, Nevada in 1996. The NSRM then loaned (and later transferred ownership to) the Western Pacific Railroad Museum in Portola, California.

In 2004, the Western Pacific Railroad Museum traded the 737 to the Double T Ranch in Stevinson, California. The Double T has cosmetically restored the engine to its 1914 (SP #216) appearance, and placed it on display along with some antique passenger cars. This exhibit was dubbed as the "History Train", and offers "excursion rides". During these excursions, the train does not actually move, but sounds and motions that simulate a train ride are produced to create an illusion that the train is in motion.

== Accidents and incidents ==
On February 4, 1982, the Steamtown shop and storage building collapsed under the weight of three feet of heavy, wet snow. This damaged No. 2317 but not seriously enough to remove it from excursion service.
