= Morgan Run, Ohio =

Unincorporated community in Ohio, U.S.

Coordinates: 40°16′53″N 81°47′39″W

Morgan Run is an unincorporated community in Coshocton County, in the U.S. state of Ohio.

== History ==
John Morgan built one of the first sawmills in the area on Morgan Run.
