= Railroad Museum of New England =

In Thomaston, Connecticut, US

Coordinates: 41.6738°N 73.0684°W

- Terminus: Thomaston, Connecticut

Commercial operations
- Built by: Naugatuck Railroad
- Original gauge: 4 ft 8 1/2 in (1,435 mm) standard gauge

Preserved operations
- Owned by: RMNE
- Operated by: Naugatuck Railroad
- Reporting mark: NAUG
- Length: 20 mi (32 km)
- Preserved gauge: 4 ft 8 1/2 in (1,435 mm) standard gauge

Commercial history
- Opened: 1849

Preservation history
- Headquarters: Thomaston, Connecticut

The Railroad Museum of New England (reporting mark RMNE) is a railroad museum based in Thomaston, Connecticut. Through its operating subsidiary known as the Naugatuck Railroad, the museum operates excursion and freight trains on the Torrington Secondary between Waterville and Torrington. The Railroad Museum of New England name and trademark was adopted in 1987, as a result of reassessing the Connecticut Valley Railroad Museum's goals and visions (CVRM had been founded in the mid-1960s). Home to one of the largest collections of preserved historic railroad equipment in New England, RMNE and its predecessor organizations have been active since the 1960s.

== History ==
=== Origins ===
The CVRM (and predecessor organization - the Connecticut Valley Railroad Association [CVRA]) was responsible for organizing steam train excursions within Connecticut during the late 1960s and was instrumental in opening the Valley Railroad in Essex, Connecticut in 1971. The volunteers of the non-profit CVRA established a relationship with the for-profit Valley Railroad allowing for a permanent home for the organization's growing collection. In exchange, volunteers contributed to the upkeep and operation of the Valley Railroad's trains.

Through the 1980s, more pieces were added to the collection, restored, and occasionally operated on the Valley Railroad. By the end of the decade, it was clear CVRA would need to find its own home if they were to continue their mission of preservation and grow their collection.

=== Search for a permanent home (1993-1996) ===
The volunteers wanted to remain in Connecticut, if possible, as it provided a central location for most of the active members. Once Conrail sold off its local freight operations to the Housatonic Railroad in 1993, they abandoned the former New Haven freight yard in Danbury, Connecticut. The complex included a turntable and former roundhouse site, active rail connections, and frequent passenger service provided by Metro-North Railroad's Danbury Branch. The site was turned down as there was no guarantee the museum would be able to operate regular excursions, which they saw as critical to their survival. Instead, the Danbury Railway Museum was established there in 1994.

Another location considered was the site of the former New Haven Columbia Junction roundhouse and freight yard in Willimantic, Connecticut. While the site offered plenty of room, almost nothing of the original facility remained other than a few derelict foundations. The active rail of the New England Central Railroad ran along the site, but there was no way the museum would be able to secure permission to operate excursions. Instead, the Connecticut Eastern Railroad Museum was established there in 1995.

=== The Naugatuck Railroad reborn (1996-present) ===
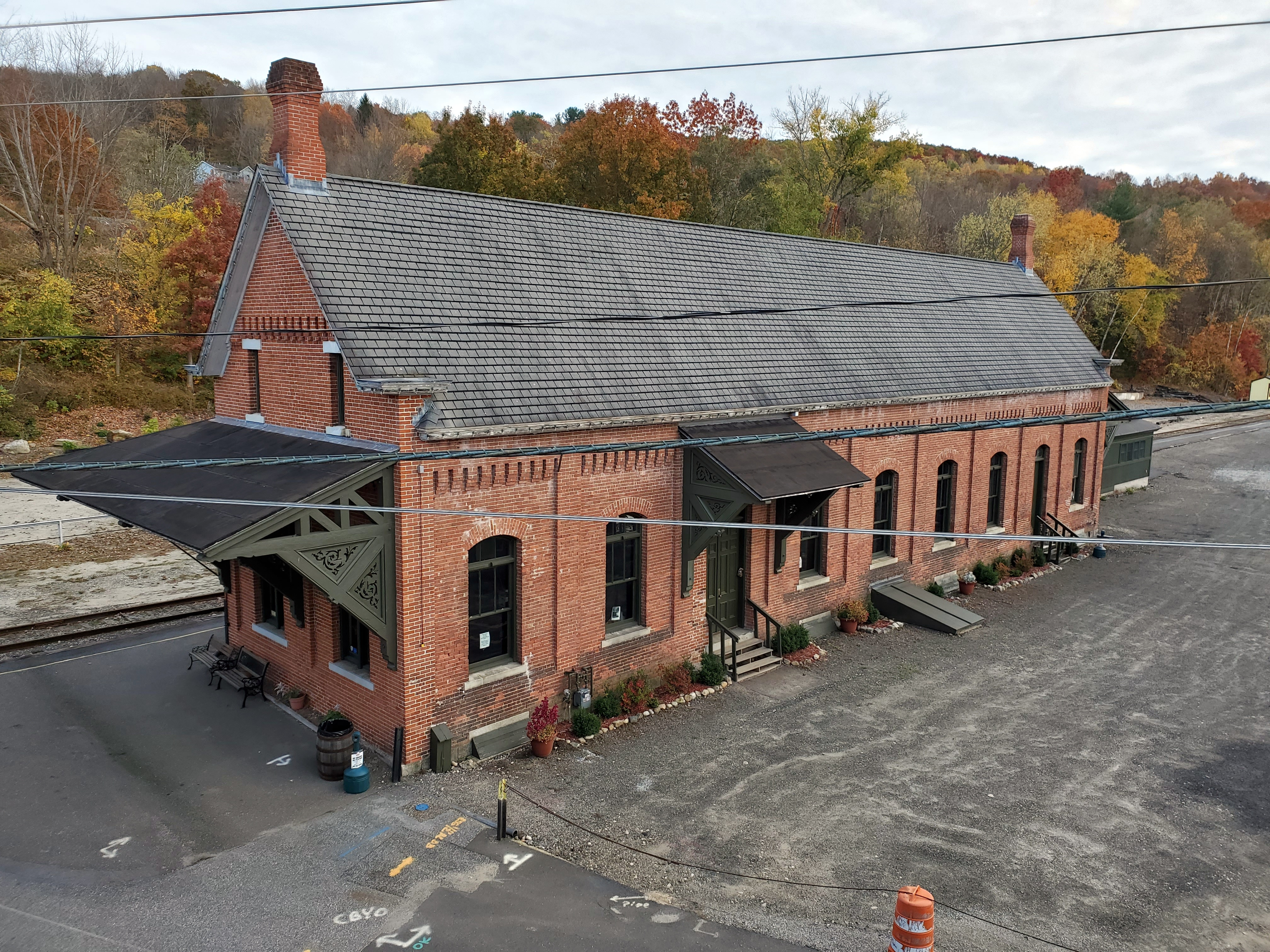
Thomaston station in 2020

In early 1995, the RMNE was offered the opportunity to develop the ex-New Haven line from Waterbury to Torrington, owned by the Connecticut Department of Transportation (CDOT). RMNE chartered a "new" Naugatuck Railroad Company in June 1995 (150 years to the month after the original Naugatuck Railroad charter in 1845) and worked with CDOT Rail Operations to get the new railroad into operation during the 1996 season.

Efforts came to fruition in September 1996 when the current Naugatuck Railroad commenced a tourist scenic train over the 19.6 miles (31.5 km) of the Naugatuck Railroad's right-of-way that had opened for service in September 1849.

The railroad is headquartered at Thomaston station, built in 1881 and last used by passengers in 1958. Disused for many years, it was set on fire by vandals in 1993. Ownership was transferred to RMNE in 1996. With a grant from a local bank, the roof was replaced in 1997. Volunteers have been steadily repairing and restoring the building to its mid-century appearance. The station also houses historic railroad displays, and a display track that houses historic railroad equipment is also located at the Thomaston Station.

Tourist excursions are run several days a week between May and December from the historic Thomaston Station. The length of the railroad is about 20 miles (32 km) total. Excursions operate between Waterbury and Torrington.

The railroad's restoration shop and storage yard are located in Thomaston, Connecticut.

Special event trains are run during fall and winter months.

RMNE has an extensive collection of locomotives and rolling stock of New England heritage, with over 60 pieces of full-sized railroad equipment. The New Haven, Boston & Maine, Maine Central, Rutland, and Bangor & Aroostook railroads are represented. Numerous smaller items, from signals to railroad corporate records, are also part of RMNE's artifact holdings.

Museum volunteers and Naugatuck Railroad employees operate the trains and maintain the locomotives and other rolling stock.

== Rolling stock ==
=== Steam locomotives ===
NAUG #	Image	Wheel arrangement	Built	Builder	Status	Notes
103		2-6-2	1925	BLW	Restoration	Built for the Sumter and Choctaw Railway, located in Alabama, by the Baldwin Locomotive Works in 1925. In 1961, the Empire State Railway Museum acquired the locomotive and was eventually moved to their site in New York. In 1971, the #103 was moved to the Connecticut Valley Railroad for use on the newly formed Valley Railroad Company, and on July 29, 1971, hauled the company's first train. However, in 1975, the locomotive was removed from service, due to being too small for the railroad's growing operation. In 1987, the RMNE acquired the #103 from the Empire State Railway Museum and was moved to Thomaston from Essex in June 2009. In 2023, it was announced that the locomotive would return to operation.
1246		4-6-2	1946	MLW	Stored	Former Steamtown, U.S.A. locomotive. Used as a display during the railroad's holiday excursions.

=== Diesel locomotives ===
NAUG #	Image	Model	Built	Builder	Status	Notes
52		25-ton	1952	GE	Display	Former Hartford Electric Light Company and later Yankee Gas. Was acquired in 2002. Currently on display at Thomaston Station.
140		RS-3	1951	ALCO	Parts	Used as a parts source.
0401		FA-1	1947	ALCO	Out of Service	New Haven #0401 operated in regular service on the New Haven Railroad until the merger with Penn Central, when the locomotive was renumbered to #1330. In 1974, the locomotive began operation on the Long Island Rail Road as #618. In 1985, the Railroad Museum of New England acquired the #618 and was renumbered to #0401. The #0401 was the first ALCO cab-type diesel locomotive to be preserved in the United States. #0401 was moved to the Railroad Museum of New England's property on the Valley Railroad in 1986 and was later moved to the RMNE's new property in 2008.
529		RS-3	1950	ALCO	Restoration	New Haven #529 operated on the New Haven Railroad until the merger with Penn Central. The locomotive was renumbered to #5536 and was later sold to Amtrak and again renumbered to #1338, and again renumbered to #138. The locomotive was acquired in 1985 and was renumbered to #529, being the first former New Haven Railroad locomotive to ever be preserved. #529 returned to service in 1985 on the Valley Railroad and in 1986, the locomotive was returned to the classic 1959 New Haven Railroad paint scheme. The locomotive was moved to the RMNE's new property, when the RMNE collection was moved from Old Saybrook, and the #529 operated the first train on the new Naugatuck Railroad in 1996.
557		RS-3	1953	ALCO	Out of Service	Built for the Maine Central by ALCO in 1953, the locomotive was sold in 1976 to the Wolfeboro Railroad. In 1995, the locomotive was sold to the Railroad Museum of New England and was moved to the Naugatuck Railroad in 1996.
686		GP9	1959	EMD	Operational	Built for the Norfolk and Western Railway in 1959 by EMD and later became under the ownership of Norfolk Southern after the merger with the Southern Railway in 1982. The locomotives were later acquired by the Hampton and Branchville Railroad. In 2019, the locomotives arrived on Naugatuck Railroad property. #686 was restored to operational condition and entered service in late 2019 painted in a black N&W inspired paint scheme, while #859 was restored to operational condition and entered service in 2022 painted in a blue N&W inspired paint scheme.
859		GP9	1959	EMD	Operational	
1109		SW1	1939	EMD	Display	Former Boston and Maine #1109, the locomotive was used in service until being acquired by the M&B and being renumbered to #27. The locomotive was later purchased by the Pioneer Valley Railroad and later the RMNE. The locomotive was eventually moved to the RMNE's Saybrook Yard before being transferred to the Naugatuck Railroad. Currently on static display at Thomaston Station.
1508		RS-3	1954	ALCO	Out of Service	
1732		GP9	1957	EMD	Out of Service	Built for the Boston and Maine in 1957. The locomotive was used in freight service by both the B&M and the later Guilford Transportation, which later renumbered the locomotive to #68. In 1996, the locomotive was sold to a locomotive leasing company, and in the following year was purchased by the RMNE. In 1998, the locomotive was repainted and renumbered from #68 to 1732 and was painted into a B&M inspired Naugatuck Railroad scheme.
2019		FL9	1960	EMD	Out of Service	Built for the New Haven Railroad as #2049 by EMD. Would later be transferred to Penn Central as #5049 and then Conrail #5049, before being used on Metro North for commuter service along with being renumbered to #503. The locomotive arrived on Naugatuck Railroad property in 2002, being owned by the Connecticut Department of Transportation along with sister FL9 #2002, before being donated to the RMNE in 2009. The unit was damaged in a derailment on June 29, 2025, while pulling an excursion to help benefit the Mount Rainier Scenic Railroad.
2033		FL9	1960	EMD	Out of Service	Being the last FL9 to be built, #2033 operated with the New Haven as #2059 until the merger with Penn Central, when the locomotive became Penn Central #5059 and eventually Conrail #5059. When the Metro-North Commuter Railroad acquired the locomotive, it was again renumbered to #2033. In 2002, the locomotive was acquired by the Railroad Museum of New England and moved to the RMNE shops in 2003.
2201		B23-7	1978	GE	Out of Service	Built by GE for the Providence and Worcester Railroad. Purchased in November 2020 for spare parts.
2525		U25B	1965	GE	Out of Service	Being the final locomotive built for the New Haven Railroad, the #2525 ran in regular service on the New Haven until the merger with Penn Central and was renumbered to #2685, and eventually became Conrail #2685. The locomotive was retired from Conrail in 1982 and was acquired by the Railroad Museum of New England and was moved to the Valley Railroad in 1986. The locomotive was renumbered to #2525 and returned to service in 1986, eventually returning to an "as-built" look. The #2525 was moved to the RMNE's new property in Waterbury when the RMNE's collection was moved from Old Saybrook.
2798		U23B	1977	GE	Operational	Being the last U23B ever built, #2798 operated with Conrail until it was sold to Providence & Worcester in the early 1990s and renumbered to #2203. Shortly after being retired from P&W in 2002, #2203 was acquired by the Naugatuck Railroad, and was moved to their property in 2003. In May 2026, #2203 was unveiled in a special livery marking the United States' Semiquincentennial, and renumbered back to #2798. Will eventually be repainted back to Conrail colors. The locomotive is primarily used for freight service but sees occasional use on the railroad's passenger trains.

=== Passenger cars ===
NAUG #	Image	Type	Built	Builder	Notes
260		Combine/First Class	1893	Wagner	Built by the Wagner Car Company for the Rutland Railroad as a coach, it was later converted into a combine car by the Rutland shops in 1920. In 1963, the car was sold to the Green Mountain Railroad and was used on passenger excursions until 2009. The car was used on Naugatuck Railroad excursions as a First Class accommodation.
575		Lounge	1956	Budd	Built by Budd for the Atchison, Topeka and Santa Fe Railway, #575, #580, and #736 first saw use on the El Capitan between Chicago and Los Angeles. In 1971, all three cars were acquired by Amtrak, and were at some point renumbered to #39970, #39975, and #39936 respectively. In the 1990s, #39936 was retired from Amtrak, while #39970 and #39975, along with three other ex-ATSF Hi-Level lounge cars, were refurbished for use on the Coast Starlight between Seattle and Los Angeles, branded as the "Pacific Parlour Car". The refurbished lounges would be used on the Coast Starlight until their retirement from Amtrak in 2018. In 2019, #39970, #39975, and #39936 were acquired by the Steam Railroading Institute for use on excursions out of Owosso, Michigan, with the cars being renumbered back to their original ATSF road numbers. In January 2025, the RMNE acquired the three Hi-Level cars, and they arrived on their property on May 29.
580		Lounge	1956	Budd	
736		Transition Coach	1964	Budd	
1001		Premium Coach/Lounge	1980	Budd	Built for the Connecticut Department of Transportation as a SPV-2000 commuter coach. The car was later depowered and converted into a conference car for the governor of Connecticut. The coach was acquired by a private individual and is currently leased to the NAUG and entered service at the end of the 2023 holiday season. The coach is used split into two sections with one being a Premium Coach and the other being a Lounge. The car is also equipped with a cab, equipped with a horn and bell for crews to watch the shoving move. 1001 was repainted into its as-delivered Amtrak Phase III livery in early 2026 to mark the United States' Semiquincentennial.
3659		Open Air/Crew Car	1945	Pullman	Built as a troop sleeper car and later converted to a baggage/mail express car. The car was donated to the RMNE 1976, and was restored in 1984, and a second restoration in 2019, which included renumbering from 3040 to previous New Haven number 3659.
4952			1920	CC&F	Built for the Canadian National Railway for mainline service and was later used for commuter service in the 1969-1970s. Was donated to the RMNE in the 1990s. #4952 arrived at RMNE property in 1996. Out of service.
4980		Coach	1924	CC&F	Built for the Canadian National Railway for mainline service and was later used for commuter service in the 1969-1970s. Was donated the RMNE in the 1990s. #4980 arrived at RMNE property in 1997. Used on the Naugatuck Railroad's passenger excursions.
5046		Coach	1923	CC&F	Built for the Canadian National Railway for mainline service and was later used for commuter service in the 1969-1970s. Was donated to the RMNE in the 1990s. #5046 arrived at RMNE property in 1996. In 2023, the coach was repainted to a Canadian National Railway inspired Naugatuck Railroad Paint scheme and is used on the Naugatuck Railroad's passenger excursions.
5084		Coach/Counter	1924	CC&F	Acquired from the Bytown Railway Society after being donated in 2024. The coach was renumbered from #4977 to original CN number #5084. Entered service on 2024 holiday excursions. The coach is equipped with a counter for bar service.
5089		Lounge	1927	NSC	Built for the Canadian National Railway for mainline service and was later used for commuter service in the 1969-1970s. Was donated to the RMNE in the 1990s. #5089 arrived at RMNE property in 1998. The coach was rebuilt to a lounge car in 2021 and in 2022 was repainted to a Canadian National Railway inspired Naugatuck Railroad paint scheme along with being renumbered from #4992 to its original CN number of #5089. The coach is used as a first-class lounge car on the Naugatuck Railroad's passenger excursions.
5114		Coach	1927	NSC	Built for the Canadian National Railway for mainline service and was later used for commuter service in the 1969-1970s. Was donated to the RMNE in the 1990s. #5114 arrived at RMNE property in 1997. The coach was restored in 2013, and is used on the Naugatuck Railroad's passenger excursions.
5805		Lounge	1923	CC&F	Built for the Canadian National Railway for mainline service and was later used for commuter service in the 1969-1970s. Was donated to the RMNE in 1990s. #5805 arrived at RMNE property in 1997. Currently out of service and receiving restoration work.
6606			1923	CC&F	Built for the Canadian National Railway for mainline service and was later used for commuter service in the 1969-1970s. Was acquired by the RMNE. #6606 arrived at RMNE property in 1996. Currently out of service.

== Recent restorations ==
- In 2024, the RMNE cosmetically restored former 1936 MEC Snowplow #70. The plow was used by the Maine Central, before being sold to the Green Mountain Railroad in 1981, and later being sold to the RMNE in 1996. The plow was vandalized in 2023, which included graffiti along with a breaking of a window.
- In 2024, ex-Bangor and Aroostook "State of Maine" potato car #2569 was restored.

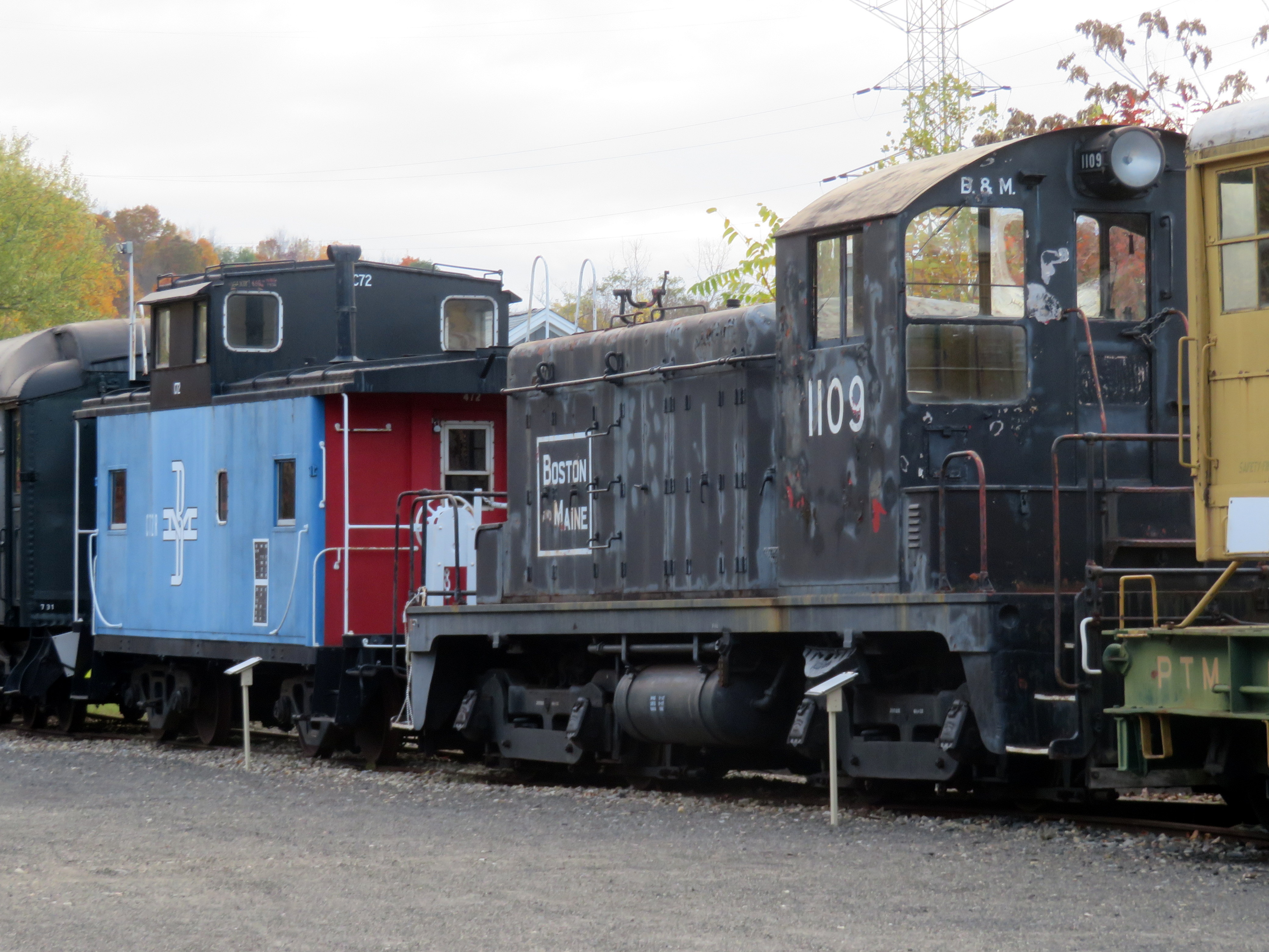
Two pieces of former Boston and Maine Railroad equipment – caboose C-472 and locomotive 1109 – at Thomaston in 2020
