= Steamtown National Historic Site =

Railroad museum in Scranton, Pennsylvania

- IUCN category III (natural monument or feature)
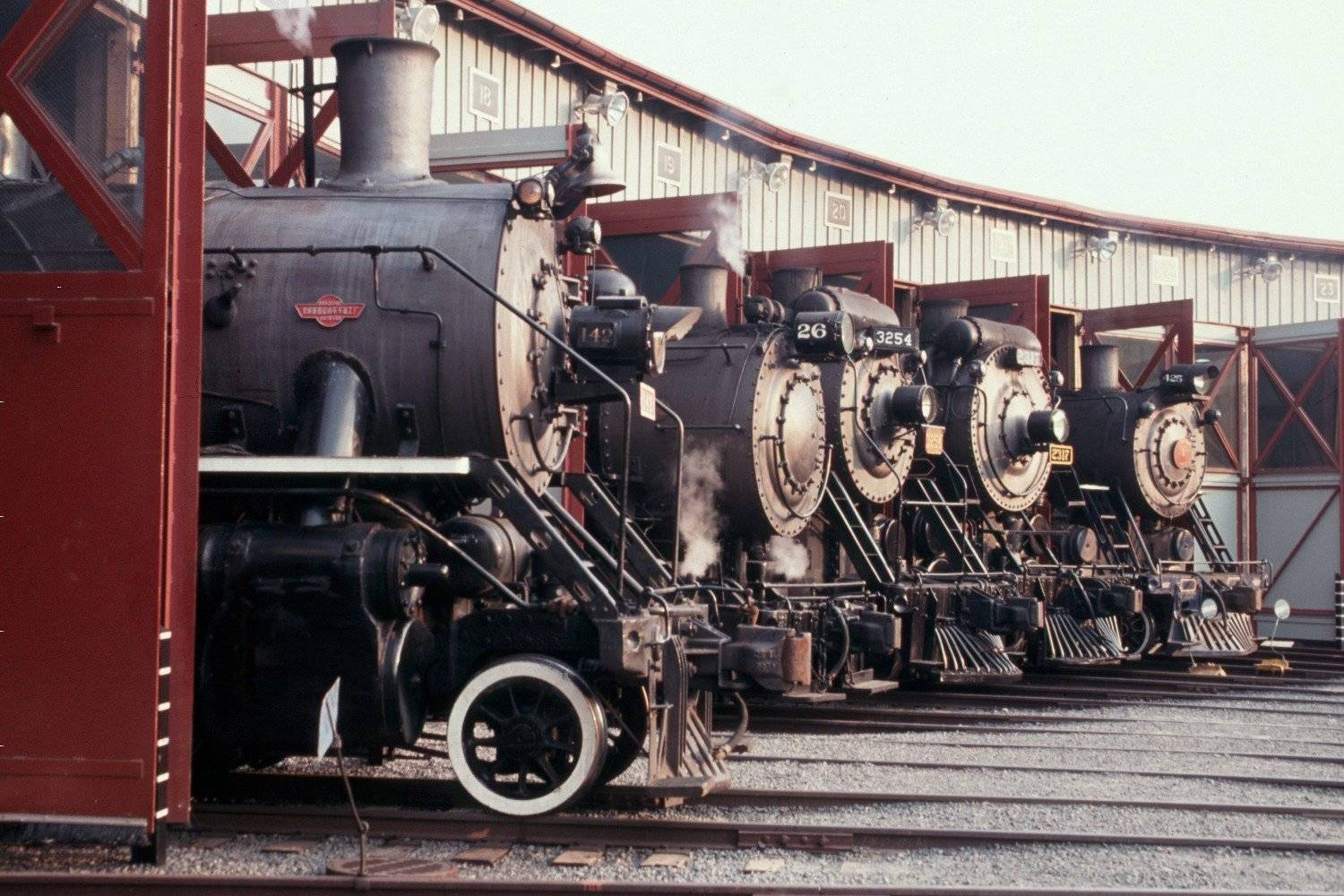
- Five locomotives in the roundhouse

- Location within Pennsylvania Location within the United States
- Location: Scranton, Pennsylvania, U.S.
- Coordinates: 41°24′26″N 75°40′17″W
- Area: 62.48 acres (25.28 ha)
- Established: October 30, 1986
- Visitors: 60,844 (in 2025)
- Governing body: National Park Service
- Website: Steamtown National Historic Site

Steamtown National Historic Site (NHS) is a railroad museum and heritage railroad located on 62.48 acres (25.3 ha) in downtown Scranton, Pennsylvania, at the site of the former Scranton yards of the Delaware, Lackawanna and Western Railroad (DL&W). The museum is built around a working turntable and a roundhouse that are largely replications of the original DL&W facilities; the roundhouse, for example, was reconstructed from remnants of a 1932 structure. The site also features several original outbuildings dated between 1899 and 1902. All the buildings on the site are listed with the National Register of Historic Places as part of the Delaware, Lackawanna and Western Railroad Yard-Dickson Manufacturing Co. Site.

Most of the steam locomotives and other railroad equipment at Steamtown NHS were originally collected by F. Nelson Blount, a millionaire seafood processor from New England. In 1964, Blount established a non-profit organization, the Steamtown Foundation, to operate Steamtown, U.S.A., a steam railroad museum and excursion business in Bellows Falls, Vermont. In 1984, the foundation moved Steamtown to Scranton, conceived of as urban redevelopment and funded in part by the city. But the museum failed to attract the expected 200,000 to 400,000 annual visitors, and within two years was facing bankruptcy.

In 1986, the U.S. House of Representatives, at the urging of Scranton native Representative Joseph M. McDade, approved $8 million to begin turning the museum into a National Historic Site. The idea was derided by those who called the collection second-rate, the site's historical significance questionable, and the public funding no more than pork-barrel politics. But proponents said the site and the collection were ideal representations of American industrial history. By 1995, the National Park Service (NPS) had acquired Steamtown, USA, and improved its facilities at a total cost of $66 million.

Steamtown National Historic Site has since sold a few pieces from the Blount collection, and added a few others deemed of greater historical significance to the region.

== Museum and collection ==
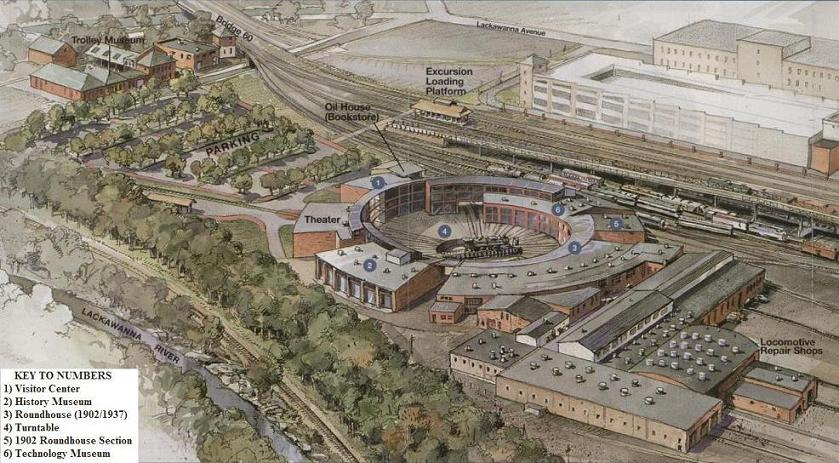
Overview of Steamtown National Historic Site

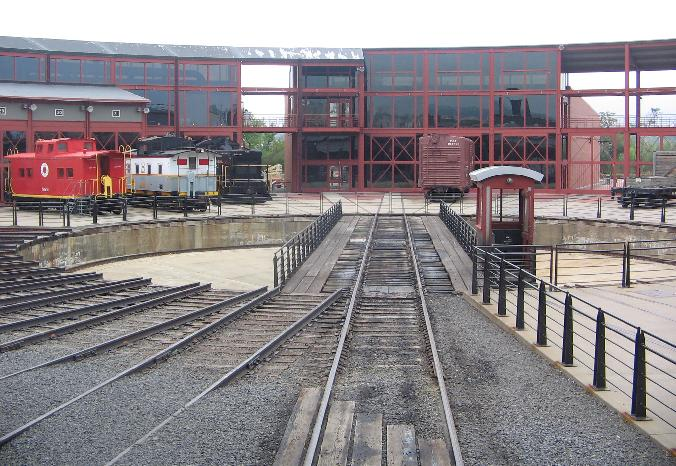
View of the turntable and museum

Steamtown NHS is located within a working railroad yard and incorporates the surviving elements of the 1902 DL&W Scranton roundhouse and locomotive repair shops. The visitor center, theater, technology and history museums are built in the style of and on the site of the missing portions of the original roundhouse, giving an impression of what the original circular structure was like.

The museum has exhibits about the history and technology of steam railroads in the United States and specifically in Pennsylvania, particularly the DL&W; life on the railroad; and the business, labor, and governmental relationships between railroads. The theater shows a short film throughout the day.

Many locomotives and freight and passenger cars are on display. Some have open cabs and compartments that visitors can climb in and walk through, including a mail car, railroad executives' passenger car (with dining room and sleeping / lounge areas), a boxcar, two cabooses, and a recreated DL&W station with ticket window. A steam locomotive with cutaway sections helps visitors understand steam power. Part of one of the 1865 roundhouse inspection pits uncovered in archaeological excavations is also preserved in situ, under glass.

Some of the rolling stock is historically connected to the site, including a DL&W steam engine and diesel, caboose, boxcar, a former World War II troop sleeper that the DL&W converted to maintenance of way service, and numerous passenger cars. Former Oneida & Western/Rahway Valley Railroad 2-8-0 engine #15 was overhauled by the DL&W. Other noteworthy pieces are the popular Union Pacific Big Boy #4012, Canadian Pacific Railway (CP Rail) #2929 (a rare Jubilee 4-4-4), Nickel Plate Road (NKP) S-2 #759, and Reading Company (RDG) T-1 #2124.

Engines NKP #759, CN #47, New Haven Trap Rock Co. #43, and Rahway Valley #15 have operated at Steamtown, but not since the move to Pennsylvania.

== Equipment ==
=== Locomotives ===
Locomotive details (Note: Attributed to multiple sources:)
Number	Image	Type	Built	Builder	Status	Notes
1		2-6-2	1914	Baldwin Locomotive Works	Display	
1		Class B Shay	1910	Lima Locomotive Works	Under restoration	Damaged by building collapse in 1983.
2		0-4-0T	1937	H.K. Porter, Inc.	Display, cosmetically restored	Smallest locomotive in the collection.
3		0-6-0T	1927	American Locomotive Company	Display	
7		2-4-2T	1911	Vulcan Iron Works	Display	
8		0-6-0	1923	Baldwin Locomotive Works	Display	Formerly operated on the Penn View Mountain Tourist Railroad from 1964 to 1966.
15		2-8-0	1916	Baldwin Locomotive Works	Display	Originally built for the Oneida and Western Railroad as 20, operated in Vermont.
26		0-6-0	1929	Baldwin Locomotive Works	Operational	Operated in excursion service from 1990 to 1999, returned to steam in December 2015, runs excursion trains on the Scranton Limited.
43		0-4-0T	1919	Vulcan Iron Works	Display	
44		4-6-0	1905	Brooks Locomotive Works	Display, awaiting possible cosmetic restoration	Oldest surviving Nickel Plate Road locomotive.
47		4-6-4T	1914	Montreal Locomotive Works	Display, awaiting possible cosmetic restoration	The first steam locomotive to pull excursion runs at Steamtown, prior to the move from Vermont.
132		SW-8	1953	Wabash Railroad	Display	Painted as Lackawanna No. 500.
504/506		F3	1948	Electro-Motive Division	Operational	Repainted as Lackawanna 663 and 664. Operates excursion trains from Scranton.
514		GP9	1958	Electro-Motive Division	Operational	Operates excursion trains from Scranton.
519		2-8-0	1913	American Locomotive Company	Display, awaiting possible cosmetic restoration	
565		2-6-0	1908	American Locomotive Company	Display	Only DL&W locomotive in the collection.
759		2-8-4	1944	Lima Locomotive Works	Display	Operated in excursion service between 1968 and 1973.
790		2-8-0	1903	American Locomotive Company	Display	Oldest locomotive in the collection.
1901		SW1	1939	Electro-Motive Division	Undergoing overhaul	
1923		2-8-0	1920	American Locomotive Company	Display	Built for Compañía Azucarera Central Reforma of Cuba as No. 8 but never delivered.
2124		4-8-4	1947	Reading Shops	Display	Built from Reading I-10sa class 2-8-0 2044
2317		4-6-2	1923	Montreal Locomotive Works	Display	Sold to Nelson Blount for Steamtown U.S.A. in November 1965. Operated in excursion service from 1978 to 2010. Stored inside the shops on display.
2505		DL&W MU	1930	Pullman Company	Display	Only piece of electric equipment in the collection.
2929		4-4-4	1936	Canadian Locomotive Company	Display, awaiting possible cosmetic restoration	Only streamlined steam locomotive in the collection.
3254		2-8-2	1917	Canadian Locomotive Company	Display	Operated in excursion service from 1987 to 2012. On static display.
3377		2-8-2	1919	Canadian Locomotive Company	Display, awaiting possible restoration	Previously used as a spare parts provider for No. 3254. Currently on static display, awaiting for a possible restoration.
3713		4-6-2	1934	Lima Locomotive Works	Under slow restoration	Named the "Constitution".
4012		4-8-8-4	1941	American Locomotive Company	Display	Largest locomotive in the collection.
6039		4-8-2	1925	Baldwin Locomotive Works	Display	Only 4-8-2 "Mountain" type in the collection.
6816		0-6-0F	1923	H.K. Porter Inc.	Display	Only fireless locomotive in the collection.

=== Former units ===
Locomotive details
Number	Image	Heritage	Type	Builder	Notes
210		Northwood and St. Lawrence Railroad	2-6-0	American Locomotive Company	Acquired by the St. Lawrence Power and Equipment Museum in Madrid, New York in 2026.
926		Southern Railway (UK)	4-4-0	SR Eastleigh Works	Sold in 1989. Currently operational at North Yorkshire Moors Railway
2816		Canadian Pacific Railway	4-6-4	Canadian Locomotive Company	Sold to CP Rail where it operated in excursion service until 2012. Returned to operation under CPKC in 2023.
1293		Canadian Pacific Railway	4-6-2	Canadian Locomotive Company	Sold to Jerry Joe Jacobson to operate on the Ohio Central Railroad. Now on static display at the Age of Steam Roundhouse, awaiting its 1,472-day inspection and rebuild.
1278		Canadian Pacific Railway	4-6-2	Canadian Locomotive Company	Had been favorited by Blount. Traded to Gettysburg Railroad for Canadian National 3254, where it operated until a 1995 boiler explosion. Now on static display at the Age of Steam Roundhouse.
1246		Canadian Pacific Railway	4-6-2	Montreal Locomotive Works	The only G5 locomotive to operate in Scranton, it was sold at an auction in 1988 to the Valley Railroad in Connecticut. Now on display at the Railroad Museum of New England.
1098		Canadian Pacific Railway	4-6-0	Canadian Locomotive Company	It was sold in 1987 to George Hart to operate for his Rail Tours Inc.. It is on static display at the Reading Blue Mountain and Northern Railroad as 225.
1218		Norfolk and Western Railway	2-6-6-4	Norfolk and Western’s Roanoke Shops	Traded to the Norfolk Southern Railway in exchange for NKP 514 and Wabash 132 to operate in mainline excursion service from 1987 to 1991. Now on static display at the Virginia Museum of Transportation in Roanoke, Virginia.
1395		Canadian National Railway	4-6-0	Montreal Locomotive Works	It was sold at an auction in 1988 to the Coopersville and Marne Railway in Coopersville, Michigan. It is currently on display under a canopy, received a cosmetic restoration in August 2024.
1551		Canadian National Railway	4-6-0	Montreal Locomotive Works	It was traded to Jerry Joe Jacobson in exchange for Baldwin Locomotive Works 26, and it became the very first steam locomotive to pull trains on the Ohio Central Railroad System. It now resides at the Age of Steam Roundhouse.
5288		Canadian National Railway	4-6-2	Montreal Locomotive Works	It was purchased by the Tennessee Valley Railroad Museum in Chattanooga, Tennessee in 2001. In 2023, ownership of the engine was transferred to the Colebrookdale Railroad.
1361		Pennsylvania Railroad	4-6-2	PRR Juniata Shops	Moved to Scranton in 1996 for a complete restoration in partnership with University of Scranton, and the Railroaders Memorial Museum. However after several years of work, the plan was cancelled in April 2010 and the engine was moved back to Altoona in 2013. Currently undergoing third restoration attempt.

Several engines not part of the collection have visited the Scranton site: NYS&W #142, BM&R #425 (now Reading Blue Mountain and Northern 425), Lowville & Beaver River Shay #8, former RDG T-1 #2102 (restored and operable by Reading Blue Mountain and Northern), Milwaukee Road 261, PRR 1361, NKP 765, and Union Pacific Big Boy 4014. "Peppersass" No. 1 from Mount Washington Cog Railway visited the Steamtown Scranton site during Railfest 2016, and revisited again during March 11 to 13, 2019.

== Demonstrations, tours, and excursions ==
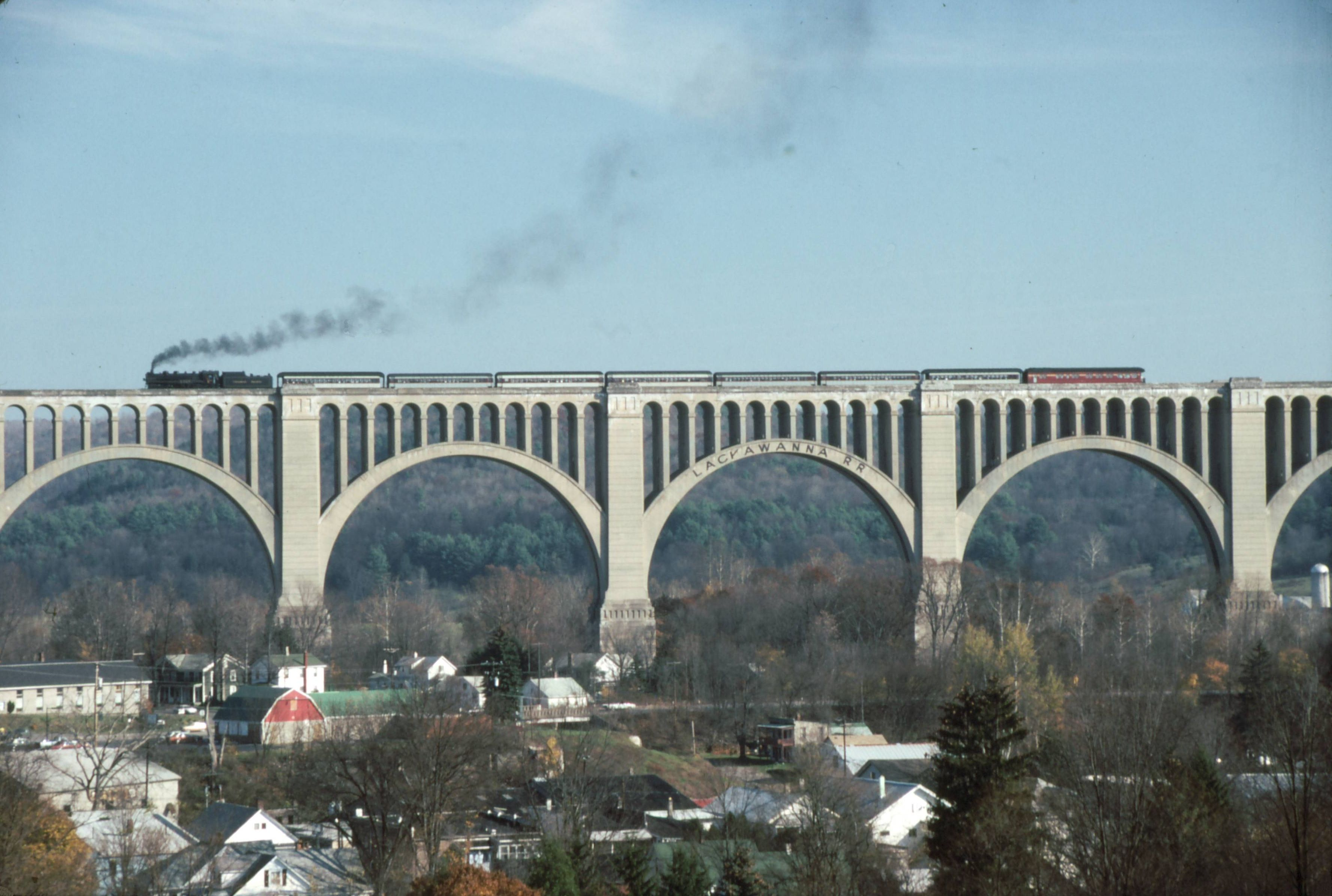
A Steamtown excursion crosses Tunkhannock Viaduct.

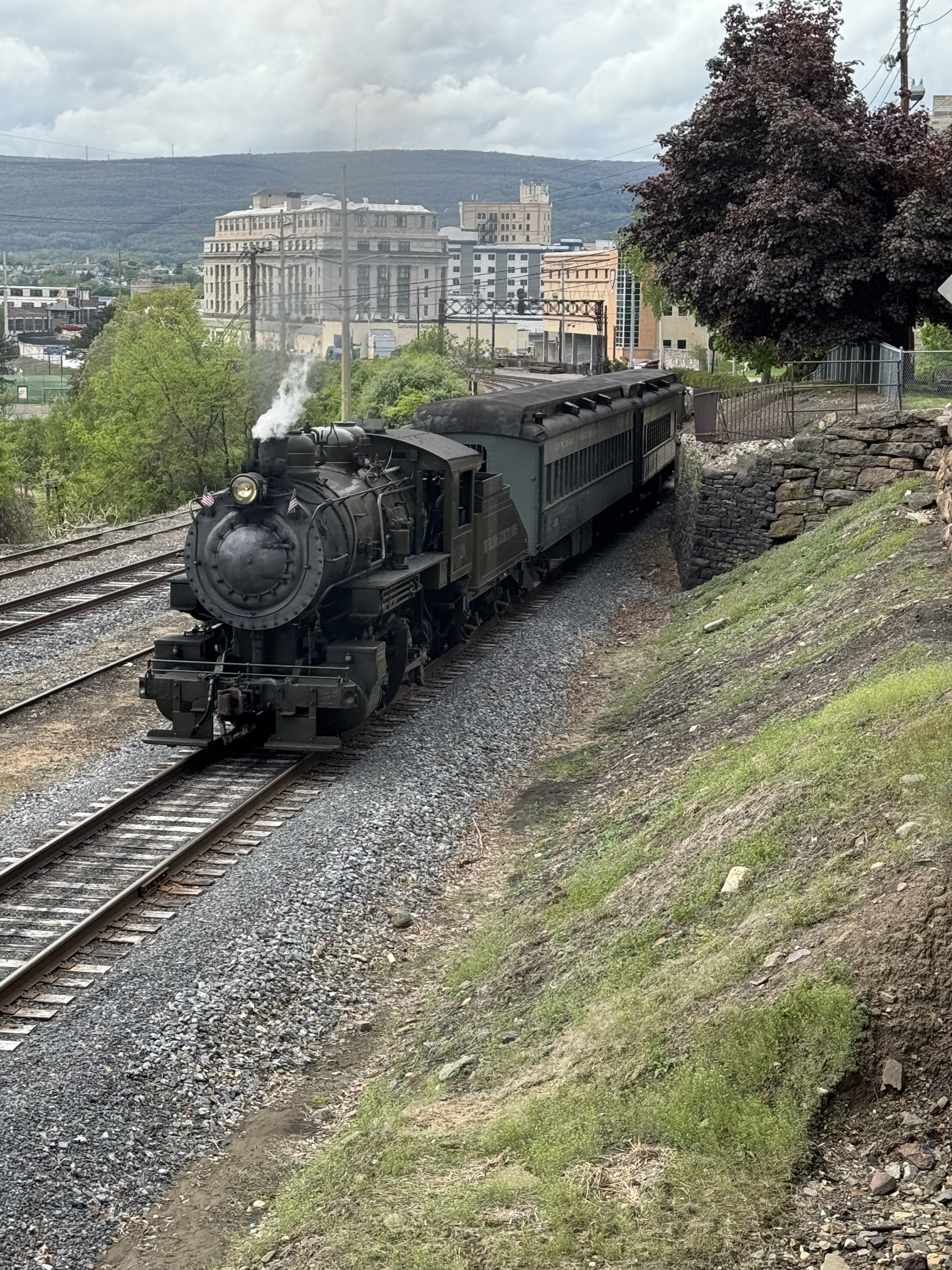
A Steamtown excursion crosses near the campus of the University of Scranton. The former Delaware, Lackawanna and Western Railroad Station is visible in the background.

Steamtown NHS offers a variety of demonstrations, tours, and excursions that demonstrate how railroads functioned in the age of steam. Park rangers give guided tours of the locomotive shop, where one can see work being done on the steam engines in the original roundhouse area; the Union Pacific Big Boy locomotive on display; and demonstrations of the turntable on a regular basis. They also give talks on the history of Steamtown. The Scranton yard occupies about 40 acres (16 ha).

Several working locomotives take visitors on short excursions through the Scranton yard in the spring, summer, and fall. Most rides are on passenger coaches, but there are also caboose and handcar rides offered. Longer excursions are scheduled with separate tickets. These include a ride on a Pullman coach and longer trips to various nearby towns, including Carbondale, Tobyhanna, Moscow, Delaware Water Gap, Cresco, East Stroudsburg and Gouldsboro, Pennsylvania. Until 2012, Steamtown hosted RailCamp, a program put on by the National Railway Historical Society to educate future railroad employees and fans of the industry about railroad operation and preservation.

== History ==
=== New England roots ===
F. Nelson Blount, the heir to the largest seafood processor in the United States, was an avid railroad enthusiast. When he was 17, he wrote a book on steam power; later, he amassed one of the largest collections of vintage steam locomotives in the United States. By 1964, part of his collection — 25 steam locomotives from the United States and Canada, 10 other locomotives, and 25 pieces of rolling stock — was housed at North Walpole, New Hampshire. The Monadnock, Steamtown & Northern Railroad, as the enterprise was then called, ran excursions between Keene and Westmoreland, New Hampshire.

After failing in 1962 to convince the State of New Hampshire to take over control of the bulk of the collection, Blount established the "Steamtown Foundation for the Preservation of Steam and Railroad Americana" to operate Steamtown, USA in 1964. The non-profit, charitable, educational organization was to have nine un-salaried directors, including the five incorporators: Blount, former New Hampshire governor Lane Dwinell; Emile Bussiere; Robert L. Mallat Jr., mayor of Keene; and Bellows Falls Municipal Judge Thomas P. Salmon, who later became governor of Vermont. The president of the Campbell Soup Company, William B. Murphy, who had also served as National Chairman of Radio Free Europe, and the vice president of Blount Seafood, Fredrick Richardson, were among the other directors. The first order of business for the Steamtown Foundation was to acquire the Blount collection at North Walpole, and move it to property once owned by the Rutland Railroad, in Bellows Falls, Vermont.

Blount was killed on August 31, 1967, when his private airplane hit a tree during an emergency landing, in Marlborough, New Hampshire. By that time, a good deal of Blount's collection was controlled by the Steamtown Foundation and had been moved to Bellows Falls. One of Blount's corporations, the Green Mountain Railroad (GMRC), controlled the tracks that lay between Walpole, Bellows Falls and Chester, Vermont, which Steamtown was to use for its excursions. When Blount died, most of the controlling stock of the GMRC was transferred to the president of the railroad, Robert Adams. By 1976, the relationship between Steamtown and GMRC was strained as the two organizations fought over maintenance of the tracks, which were owned by the state of Vermont. In addition, the steam excursions that Steamtown sponsored violated Vermont's pollution regulations, but the railroad was able to operate for several years under waivers issued by the state. By 1978, the Steamtown Foundation had begun scouting for a new location for Steamtown, USA.

In 1980, Ray Holland, the Chairman of the Board of Steamtown Foundation, resigned after accusing the board of incompetence. His resignation was followed by that of Robert Barbera, a long-time director of the board. In the year that followed, Steamtown did not run excursions. Don Ball Jr., had taken over direction of Steamtown by this time and discovered that the excursion train did not meet federal safety guidelines. In 1981, despite its vast holdings of vintage railroad stock, Steamtown had only 17,000 visitors, while Connecticut's Essex Valley Railroad, which ran two small engines, had 139,000 visitors. Even in its best year, 1973, the Vermont location had attracted only 65,000 visitors.

When questions about Steamtown, USA in New England are posed, the official response of the National Park Service is:

Steamtown National Historic Site was created in 1986 to preserve the history of steam railroading in America, concentrating on the era 1850 through 1950. This is the mission of the park. The park was not created to preserve the history of Steamtown USA. Our site does touch on the history of railroad preservation, specifically in our History Museum. The work of F. Nelson Blount, creator of the former Steamtown USA, and other pioneers of the steam preservation movement, is a part (albeit a small part) of the story Steamtown NHS has been charged with preserving.

=== Move to Scranton ===
Self-syndicated newspaper columnist Michael McManus once said that his goal in writing his weekly column was "to suggest answers to problems of the old industrial states." In March 1982 a substantial article by McManus appeared in the Bangor Daily News. In the article, McManus proposed several reasons why a city, like Chicago, Pittsburgh, or Scranton, might benefit from a tourist attraction like Steamtown. McManus went on to explain why the business was failing in Vermont: past failed management, an isolated location and the lack of signs on Interstate 91, which the state opposed. Moreover, the roof of the largest storage shed on the property had collapsed under heavy snow the previous winter, damaging several pieces of equipment. Among the injured were CP Rail No. 1293, which had served on Vermont's "Bicentennial Train" and on the movie Terror Train (1979), and the Meadow River Lumber Company No. 1 Shay.

Asked by McManus to describe the value of the Steamtown collection, Jim Boyd, editor of Railfan & Railroad magazine, said, "Everything there is no longer obtainable anywhere, whether it is the "Big Boy" [Union Pacific No. 4012] or the Rahway Valley No. 15, a nice-sized locomotive any museum would give a right arm for. Most of the other large collections do not have any serviceable equipment." McManus added "What is at stake is more than tourism and jobs. It is a significant part of America's past before the welder's torch is turned on the likes of the 1877 'Prince of Liege', the rare Union Pacific diamond stack, etc. The steel alone is worth $3 million."

In June 1983, McManus wrote about Steamtown again, this time announcing that Scranton had taken his suggestion. He said that Springfield, Massachusetts, and Willimantic, Connecticut, had also vied for the collection. "But on May 24, Scranton signed a contract to get it, pledging to raise $2 million to cover the cost of moving 40 ancient steam engines and 60 cars, few of which are operable, and to create a museum." On October 23, 1983, Steamtown sponsored its last Vermont excursion, using Canadian Pacific 1246 to pull a "dozen or so cars" on a 100-mile (160 km) round trip from Riverside station to Ludlow, Vermont, and Scranton began raising money for the move.

When Scranton agreed to take on Steamtown, it was estimated that the museum and excursion business would attract 200,000 to 400,000 visitors to the city every year. In anticipation of this economic boon, the city and a private developer spent $13 million to renovate the DL&W station and transform it into a Hilton hotel, at a time when the unemployment rate in the city was 13 percent. Only 60,000 visitors showed up at Steamtown in 1987, and the 1988 excursions were canceled. After only three years, it was $2.2 million in debt and facing bankruptcy. Part of the problem was the cost of restoration of the new property and the deteriorating equipment. In addition, while the tourists in Vermont had enjoyed the sights of cornfields, farms, covered bridges, a waterfall and a gorge on a Steamtown excursion, the Scranton trip to Moscow, Pennsylvania, cut through one of the nation's largest junkyards, an eyesore described by Ralph Nader as "the eighth wonder of the world".

=== Nationalization ===
In 1986, the U.S. House of Representatives, under the urging of Scranton native Representative Joseph M. McDade, voted to approve the spending of $8 million to study the collection and to establish the site as a National Historic Site (NHS). The National Park Service (NPS) consequently conducted historical research on the Steamtown Foundation's equipment in 1987 and 1988. This research was used for a Scope of Collections Statement for Steamtown NHS and was published in 1991 under the title Steamtown Special History Study. Aside from providing concise histories of the equipment, the report also made recommendations as to whether or not each piece belonged in the now government-funded collection. Historical significance to the United States was a criterion of the recommendations. Many of the pieces of equipment that did not meet the report's recommendations were sold or traded for pieces that had historical significance to the region.

The adoption of Steamtown as a federal endeavor caused controversy. On November 23, 1991, an article in The New York Times said, "The provision for the park was inserted into a huge appropriations bill at a late-night meeting near the end of the legislative session in October 1986. Congressional authorizing committees, which are charged with setting policy and reviewing such proposals, were bypassed, and the Park Service did not conduct its customary two-year review of proposed new parks." The article noted that "a number of historians and museum curators around the nation call Steamtown a second-rate collection of trains on a third-rate site. They say that while such historic recreations have a place, the Federal Government should not be financing them simply because influential members of Congress want them for their districts." It said that James M. Ridenour, director of the Park Service, said that Steamtown was among other projects that the agency neither needed nor wanted, adding that the same collection was rejected by them when it was still in Vermont because it "lacked historic importance". Aside from the $73 million that had at that point been proposed for the development of the project, there would also be a projected annual operation cost of $6.5 million. A December 17, 1991, editorial reported that the development appropriation had been capped at $53 million, and said the Steamtown project had siphoned resources "from the Park Service's worthier, maintenance-starved projects."

William W. Scranton, former governor of Pennsylvania and descendant of the founders of Scranton, along with J. A. Panuska, president of the University of Scranton, responded to the Times' coverage with a letter to the editor. Published on January 8, 1992, the letter argued that the statement, first made by a former Smithsonian curator, that "Steamtown was a second-rate collection on a third-rate site", was unfounded. Scranton and Panuska wrote, "The collection of 29 steam engines and 82 other railroad cars and equipment is the third largest in the country, the only one available for commemorating the industrialization of America in a historic setting." They said that the 19th-century American Industrial Revolution was under-represented in the National Park System and further said that

Scranton is the only city in the Eastern United States with the vestiges of the era of industrialization (1840–1920) in plain sight, 40 acres in the middle of downtown, with car shops, locomotive shops, roundhouse, turntable, grand passenger station, a working yard, iron furnaces, passenger excursions — the whole works and a restored coal mine nearby. There is no other site like it. This city [Scranton] was founded because of its iron ore and its ability to produce rails (previously imported from England), followed by its graduation to a coal and steel economy. It is a graphic demonstration of the industrial period of our country, an excellent site for Americans to learn about their history.

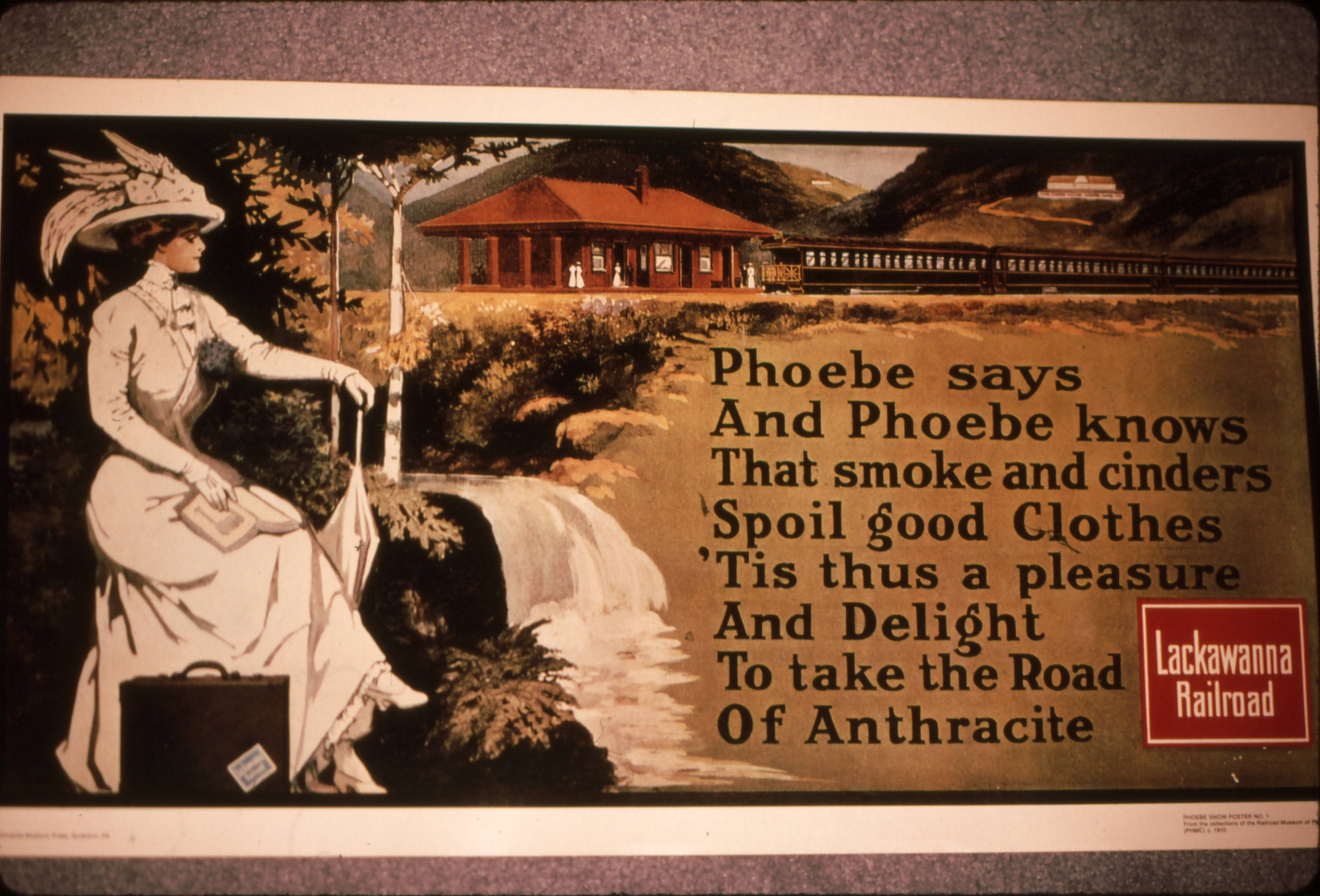
Phoebe Snow advertisement for the DL&W

The site they were referring to had mostly belonged to the DL&W, which joined the Erie Railroad in 1960 to form the Erie Lackawanna Railway. The site eventually passed to Conrail, and was purchased by the city of Scranton as the site for Steamtown, USA. The site included 13 buildings built between 1865 and 1937 that were listed on the National Register of Historic Places. Wrote Linda Greenhouse of The New York Times, "Scranton was once served by five railroads, an almost unthinkable luxury for a city of just over 80,000 people. The passenger trains stopped decades ago, but one memory remains: the Lackawanna's elegant station, just up the street from Steamtown, completed in 1908 and converted into a hotel through a public-private partnership in 1983."

In April 1992, Newsweek printed an excerpt from a soon-to-be-published book about pork-barrel politics called Adventures in Porkland. It said of Representative McDade's leadership in securing funds for Steamtown:

McDade has achieved the dream of most pork-barrel congressmen, a living memorial, indeed two: the University of Scranton's new Joseph M. McDade Center for Technology and Applied Research, and the county's McDade Park, with its Anthracite Coal Museum. But the congressman's crowning achievement is a historic theme park called Steamtown.

The article also repeated the charge that the collection was second-rate. It went on to say that at the site there was little evidence of the $40 million that had been spent to date; that several of the pieces were from the 1940s and 1950s, not the 19th century, which was the time period that was supposedly being preserved; that some of the better pieces of equipment were Canadian, not U.S.; that other museums, already in existence, were already fulfilling the historical mission of Steamtown; and that other NPS projects like Yosemite and Yellowstone were in desperate need of funding. Nevertheless, in February 1992, the House of Representatives voted against dropping the project from the NPS and instead voted to add an additional $14 million to its funding.

By 1994, one of the earlier skeptics of the Steamtown project, Railfan & Railroad magazine associate editor Mike DelVecchio, who had visited the site, had changed sides in the debate saying, "When it is finished, Steamtown will be the only place in America that can recreate the experience of mainline steam railroading." The director of Steamtown, Roger G. Kennedy, said, "those who concentrated on the pork-barrel politics of the development of the park were ignorant of the history." Len Barcousky, writing for the Pittsburgh Post-Gazette, described that history saying: "It was steam locomotives that unified the nation in the century between 1850 and 1950. Maintained in giant roundhouses in a hundred cities like Scranton, the smoke-belching engines carried the people and the goods that made possible the Industrial Revolution."

=== Operation as an NHS ===
By 1995, Steamtown had been acquired and developed by the NPS at a total cost of $66 million. In June 1995, the newest National Historic Site was ready for its grand opening. Michigan's only surviving steam locomotive, no. 1225, was to arrive on July 1 for the occasion. In November 1995, The New York Times printed a favorable review written by Supreme Court correspondent Linda Greenhouse, who had visited the site with her husband and daughter. Wrote Greenhouse, "The pleasure of the park is to see trains not only as one might see them in a museum but to see them in motion. Steamtown is a dynamic museum, with locomotives moving regularly from the yard into the park's architectural centerpiece, the roundhouse". Visitor attendance in its first year was 212,000.

By 2008, the federal government had spent a total of $176 million on Steamtown, which had an annual operating cost of $5.2 million. Visitor attendance had declined since its opening year to 61,178 in 2006. Many of the locomotives and passenger cars contained asbestos, a carcinogen. The federal government pledged $1.5 million for its removal, to be disbursed in 2011, and more money for restoration of the equipment, providing the money was matched by non-federal funds. Attendance rebounded in the 2010s, reaching 111,000 in 2011.

From October 1 through 16, 2013, Steamtown was closed, along with the rest of the National Park system, as part of the United States federal government shutdown of 2013.

In 2021, Steamtown completed a two-year, $1.6 million restoration of its largest engine, Union Pacific Big Boy #4012.

On January 19, 2025, Steamtown would select Jeremy M. Komasz as a new superintendent, replacing Cherie Shepherd who held the position since 2019.

== Accidents and incidents ==
- On July 10, 1995, less than two weeks after the museum opened, two teen-aged boys died upon being struck by Steamtown's Canadian Pacific 2317, which was pulling a train with 575 passengers on an excursion trip to Moscow, Pennsylvania. The boys were hit while trying to remove their all-terrain vehicle which had been stuck on the tracks. Two years later, the parents of these boys filed a lawsuit against the museum for $48 million.
- On October 27, 2003, No. 2317 was pulling a train through the Poconos when the tender and three of the nine passenger cars jumped the tracks. No one was injured because the train was only moving at around 10 mph. The accident occurred one mile outside Delaware Water Gap in an area known as Point of Gap.

== See also ==
- Edaville Railroad
- Lackawanna Cut-Off
- List of heritage railways
