= Canadian National 47 =

Preserved CN class X-10-a 4-6-4T steam locomotive

Canadian National 47 (ex-Grand Trunk Railway 1542)
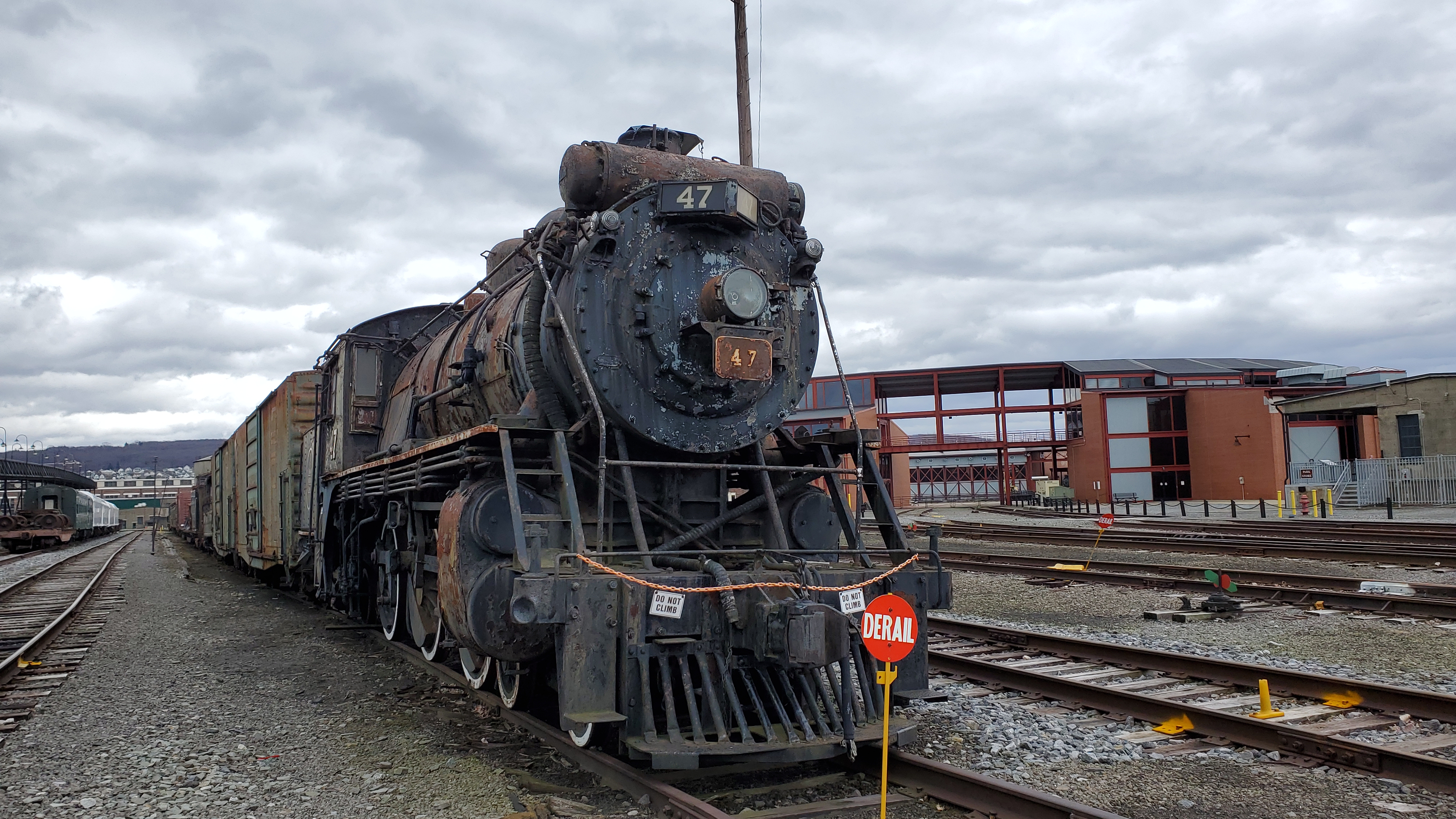
- CN 4-6-4T No. 47 on static display at Steamtown National Historic Site | April 2024
Type and origin
- Power type: Steam
- Builder: Montreal Locomotive Works
- Order number: Q-241
- Serial number: 54896
- Build date: September 1914
Specifications
- Configuration
  - Whyte: 4-6-4RT
  - UIC: 2′C2′ h2t
- Gauge: 4 ft 8 1/2 in (1,435 mm)
- Leading dia.: 31.25 in (0.794 m)
- Driver dia.: 63 in (1.600 m)
- Trailing dia.: 31.25 in (0.794 m)
- Minimum curve: 16°
- Wheelbase: 39 ft 4.5 in (12.00 m)
- Length: 50 ft 2.25 in (15.30 m)
- Adhesive weight: 146,000 lb (66.2 t)
- Loco weight: 275,000 lb (124.7 t)
- Fuel type: Coal
- Fuel capacity: 5 long tons (5.1 t)
- Water cap.: 2,900 imperial gallons (13,000 L; 3,500 US gal)
- Firebox
  - Grate area: 47 sq ft (4.4 m^{2})
- Boiler pressure: 210 lbf/in^{2} (1.45 MPa)
- Heating surface
  - Firebox: 160 sq ft (15 m^{2})
  - Tubes and flues: 1,628 sq ft (151.2 m^{2})
- Superheater
  - Type: Schmidt
  - Heating area: 342 sq ft (31.8 m^{2})
- Cylinders: Two, outside
- Cylinder size: 21 in × 26 in (533 mm × 660 mm)
- Valve gear: Walschaerts
- Valve type: 11-inch (279 mm) piston valves
- Train heating: Steam heat
- Loco brake: Air
- Train brakes: Air
- Couplers: Knuckle
Performance figures
- Tractive effort: 32,487 lbf (144.51 kN)
Career
- Operators: GTR » CN; Steamtown, U.S.A.
- Class: GTR: K2; CN: X-10-a
- Power class: CN: 32%
- Number in class: 2 of 6
- Numbers: GT 1542; CN 47
- Retired: June 1959 (revenue service); August 26, 1961 (excursion service)
- Restored: August 1961
- Current owner: Steamtown National Historic Site
- Disposition: On static display, awaiting cosmetic restoration

Canadian National 47 is a preserved X-10-a class 4-6-4RT type tank locomotive, located at Steamtown National Historic Site (NHS) in Scranton, Pennsylvania, United States. It is one of only three preserved CN 4-6-4Ts (No. 49 at the Canadian Railway Museum in Delson, Quebec, Canada, and CN No. 46 at Vallée-Jonction, Quebec) and is the only Baltic-type suburban tank locomotive remaining in the United States.

== History ==
No. 47 was originally built by the Montreal Locomotive Works in September 1914 for the Grand Trunk Railway as its No. 1542, class K2, but became a CN locomotive after the Canadian National Railway absorbed Grand Trunk in 1923. Its CN classification was X-10-a. Along with its sister locomotives, No. 47 was based in Montreal and was used exclusively in commuter service. Following retirement in June 1959, No. 47 was sold to F. Nelson Blount for $2,000, and it became a part of his collection of steam locomotives in North Walpole, New Hampshire, United States. No. 47 was the first locomotive to run excursions for Blount's Monadnock, Steamtown & Northern Railroad (MS&N), and it was intended to become the line's primary excursion locomotive. It had been given a fresh overhaul in 1958, and it was in good mechanical condition when acquired, as evidenced in tests performed by both the MS&N and the Hartford Steam Boiler Inspection and Insurance Company.

No. 47 entered service during the MS&N's first season in July 1961, operating on the tracks of the Claremont and Concord Railway (C&C) near New Hampshire's Lake Sunapee. No. 47 operated in tourist excursion service for barely five weeks when the Interstate Commerce Commission (ICC) ordered for it to be removed from service, on August 26. The locomotive's maintenance records had been disposed of upon retirement by CN, resulting in several dates of past maintenance being absent on the MS&N's own inspection form. While Blount was maintaining No. 47 for intrastate hobbyist and tourist usage, the locomotive was operating on the C&C—a regulated common carrier that participated in interstate operations.

Complete copies of No. 47's maintenance records were eventually obtained from Canada's Board of Transport Commissioners in September (contrary to popular belief they were not lost in a fire), but the newfound records revealed that the locomotive had been due for boiler retubing when retired—work that was never completed by CN. Facing a costly retubing, Blount took the locomotive out of service, replacing it with a leased Claremont and Concord GE 70-ton switcher for seven days until the 1961 season came to a premature end on September 17. As a result of a lack of an operable steam locomotive, ridership of the MS&N declined before Rahway Valley 15 entered service to pull the excursion trains the following year.

No. 47 was put on static display in North Walpole after its final run, and it was later moved across the Connecticut River with the rest of the Steamtown, U.S.A. collection to Bellows Falls, Vermont, United States. No. 47 was later moved with the rest of the collection in 1984 to Scranton, Pennsylvania, United States, where it currently remains on static display in the yard of Steamtown National Historic Site, awaiting a cosmetic restoration.

== See also ==
- List of preserved locomotives in the United States
