= E.J. Lavino and Company 3 =

E. J. Lavino and Company 3
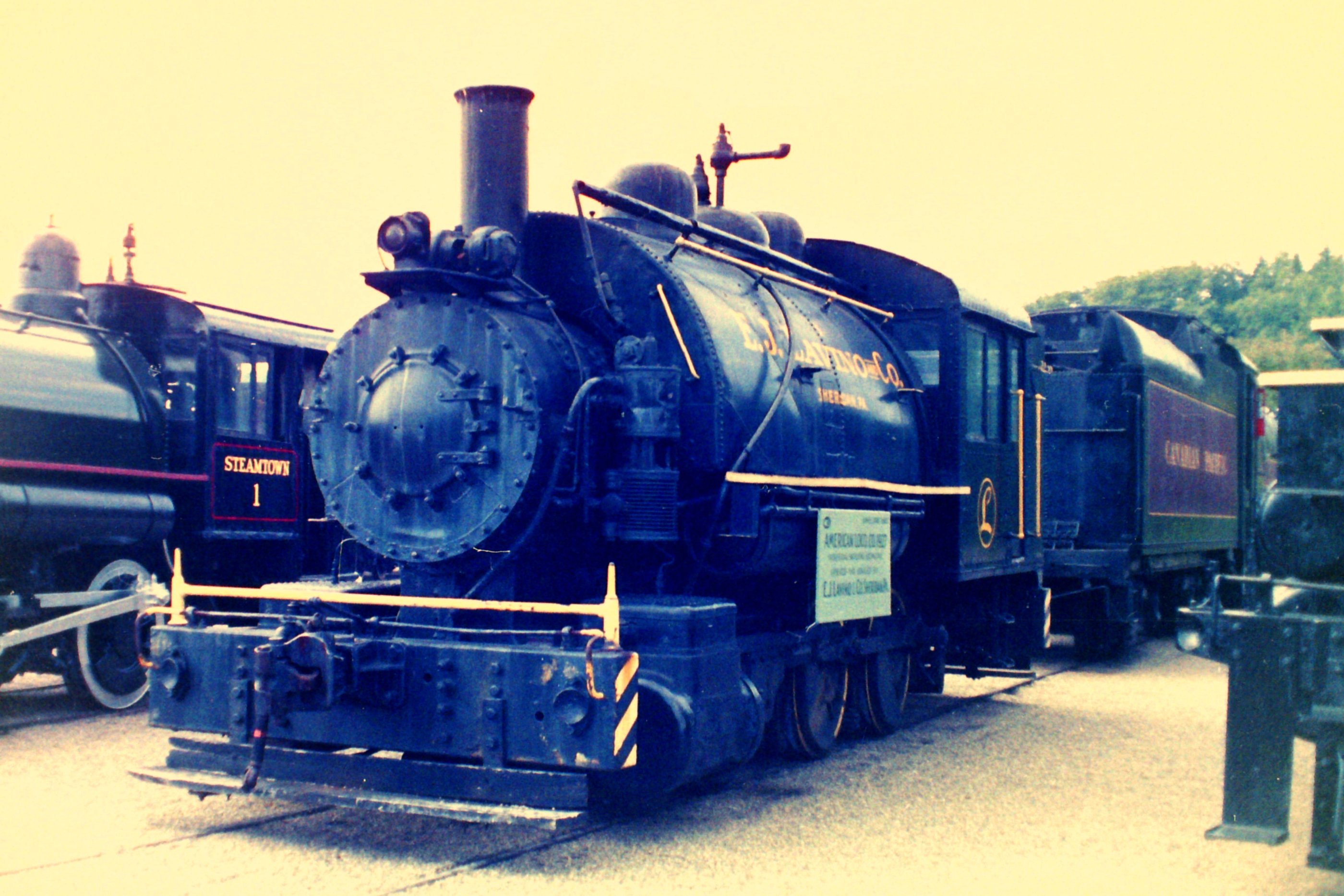
- E. J. Lavino and Co. No. 3 on display at Steamtown USA in Bellow Falls, Vermont in August 1970
Type and origin
- Power type: Steam
- Builder: American Locomotive Company
- Serial number: 67536
- Build date: August 1927
Specifications
- Configuration
  - Whyte: 0-6-0ST
  - UIC: C n2t
- Gauge: 4 ft 8 1/2 in (1,435 mm)
- Driver dia.: 44 in (1.118 m)
- Wheelbase: 10 ft 2 in (3.10 m)
- Loco weight: 107,000 lb (48.5 tonnes)
- Fuel type: Sub-bituminous coal
- Fuel capacity: 2,000 lb (907 kg)
- Water cap.: 1,500 US gal (5,700 L; 1,200 imp gal)
- Firebox
  - Grate area: 18.2 sq ft (1.69 m^{2})
- Boiler pressure: 180 lbf/in^{2} (1.24 MPa)
- Cylinders: Two, outside
- Cylinder size: 16 in × 24 in (406 mm × 610 mm)
- Valve gear: Stephenson
- Valve type: Slide valves
- Loco brake: Steam
- Train brakes: Steam
- Couplers: Knuckle
Performance figures
- Tractive effort: 21,400 lbf (95.2 kN)
Career
- Operators: E. J. Lavino and Company
- Numbers: 3
- Locale: Sheridan, Pennsylvania
- Retired: 1966
- Current owner: Steamtown National Historic Site
- Disposition: On static display

External image
- Photograph

E.J. Lavino and Company 3 is a 0-6-0ST type steam locomotive preserved at Steamtown National Historic Site. It was built by the American Locomotive Company in 1927 as Poland Springs Railroad No. 2. No record exists that the locomotive was ever delivered to Poland Springs. In any case, it is known to have been sold to the E.J. Lavino Steel Company of Sheridan, Pennsylvania sometime by 1949. In 1966, the locomotive was donated to F. Nelson Blount and Steamtown, U.S.A. in Bellows Falls, Vermont in 1966. A sister 0-6-0ST, E.J. Lavino and Company 10, is at the Pacific Southwest Railway Museum.
