= Brooks-Scanlon Corporation 1 =

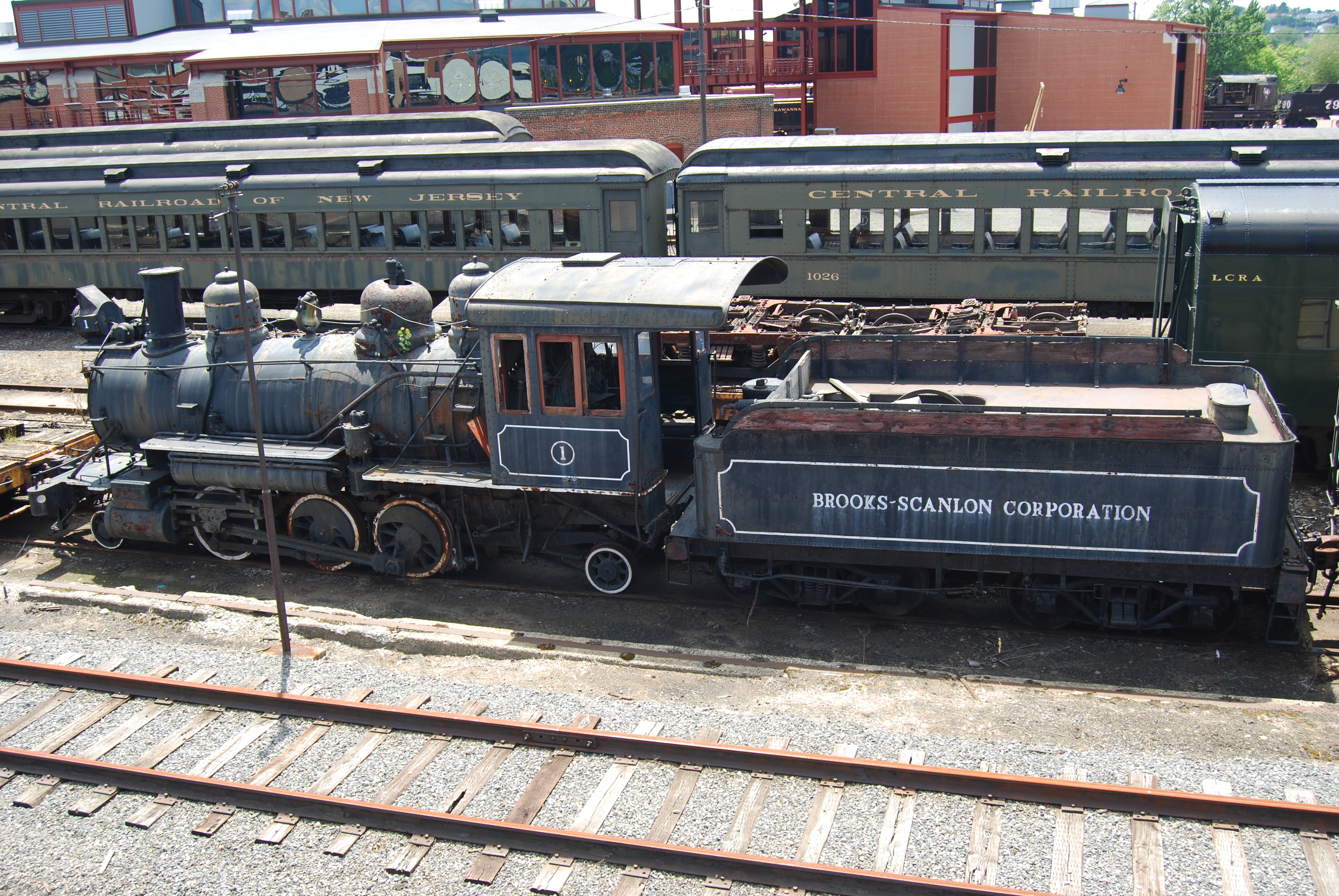
- No. 1 on display at Steamtown National Historic Site on August 4, 2008
Type and origin
- Power type: Steam
- Builder: Baldwin Locomotive Works
- Serial number: 41649
- Build date: 1914
Specifications
- Configuration
  - Whyte: 2-6-2
  - UIC: 1′C1′ n2
- Gauge: 4 ft 8 1/2 in (1,435 mm)
- Driver dia.: 42 in (1.067 m)
- Adhesive weight: 81,000 lb (36.7 tonnes)
- Fuel type: Wood or coal
- Boiler pressure: 175 lbf/in^{2} (1.21 MPa)
- Cylinders: Two, outside
- Cylinder size: 16 in × 24 in (406 mm × 610 mm)
- Valve gear: Walschaerts
- Valve type: Piston valves
- Loco brake: Air
- Train brakes: Air
- Couplers: Knuckle
Performance figures
- Tractive effort: 20,800 lbf (92.5 kN)
Career
- Operators: Carpenter-O'Brien Lumber Company; Brooks-Scanlon Lumber Company; Lee Tidewater Cypress Company
- Numbers: BSC 1
- Retired: 1959
- Preserved: 1962
- Current owner: Steamtown National Historic Site
- Disposition: On static display

Brooks-Scanlon Corporation 1 is a 2-6-2 "Prairie" type steam locomotive, built in 1914 by the Baldwin Locomotive Works (BLW). It is on display at the Steamtown National Historic Site (NHS) in Pennsylvania. This type of locomotive is referred to as a Prairie-type locomotive. This locomotive was built specifically for the lumber industry and served several lumber firms in Florida.

== History ==
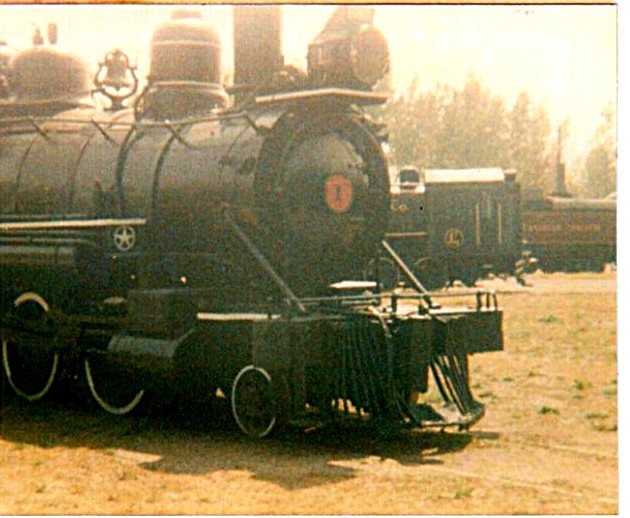
No. 1 on display at Steamtown USA in Bellow Falls, Vermont in 1974

The Carpenter-O'Brien Lumber Company was incorporated in Delaware in May 1913. The company, which operated in Florida, ordered this locomotive from Baldwin Locomotive Works (BLW), which completed it in 1914. No. 1 was put into service at the company's Eastport, Florida sawmill. The locomotive, which could burn either coal or wood, was likely originally outfitted with a Rushton, or cabbage cinder catching stack, "If so, a later owner apparently replaced the Rushton stack with the 'shotgun' stack now on the locomotive".

After the United States entered World War I in 1917, The Carpenter-o'Brien Lumber Company was sold to Brooks-Scanlon Corporation. By 1928, Brooks-Scanlon was operation in four Florida counties and producing 100,000,000 board feet (200,000 m^{3}) of lumber. This locomotive was probably used to haul logs into the mill from the woods or to switch the yard around the Eastport plant, or both.

Brooks-Scanlon closed its Eastport mill in 1929 and moved its headquarters to Foley, Florida, which was named after the company's general manager, J.S. Foley. No. 1 might have been moved to the new location. In the following years the locomotive changed hands four of five times between several interconnected Florida lumber firms.

In 1959, No. 1 was taken out of service by its then owner, Lee Tidewater Cypress, in Perry, Florida. It was sold to F. Nelson Blount in 1962 by the Lee Tidewater Cypress parent company, J.C. Turner Company. It was moved to Walpole, New Hampshire and then, across the Connecticut River, to Bellows Falls, Vermont and displayed at Steamtown, U.S.A., where it stayed until the Blount collection was relocated to Scranton, Pennsylvania.ref name="PDF" />

The Steamtown Historical Study, which was last updated in February, 2002, made the following recommendation for Brooks-Scanlon No.1:

While a Prairie-type 2-6-2 of a common-carrier railroad might be preferable to represent that type in the Steamtown collection, as this is the only locomotive of the type in the collection, the NPS should restore it "cosmetically" but not mechanically to operable condition, and should exhibit it in a roundhouse. As with each locomotive acquired, a report should be prepared prior to restoration, and that document should include the decision regarding which of three ownerships to restore the locomotive to represent: Carpenter-O'Brien, Brooks-Scanlon, or Lee Tidewater Cypress. That document should include intensive research in Florida and elsewhere as needed to obtain documents and photographs relating to the history of the locomotive and illustrating its appearance while working for its three owning firms. That report, furthermore, should specifically investigate whether the locomotive ever had a Rushton stack and determine whether it is desirable or possible to either obtain and install a genuine Rushton stack or replicate one if the locomotive did once have one. It should also locate for replication brass flag stanchions, visible in various photographs, now missing from the headlight platform of the locomotive.

== Bibliography ==
- Baldwin Locomotive Works. Logging Locomotives. Record No. 76, 1913. n.p. [Philadelphia]: Baldwin Locomotive Works, 1913. [See pp. 35–41 for builder's photographs and specifications for seven 2-6-2 locomotives similar to Brooks-Scanlon No. 1 built for various lumber companies.]
- __________. Catalog of Locomotives. n.p. [Philadelphia]: Baldwin Locomotive Works, n.d. (c. 1914). [See p. 82, devoted to photograph and specifications of Locomotive No. 101 lettered for the Industrial Lumber Company, and similar to Brooks-Scanlon No. 1.]
- Beebe, Lucius. "The Last of the Wood Burners." Trains, Vol. 7, No. 1 (Nov. 1946): 52–55.
- _________, and Charles Clegg. Mixed Train Daily: A Book of Short-Line Railroads. Berkeley: Howell-North Books, 1961: 8–13, 20, 300.
- Ferrell, Mallory. Letters to author. Apr. 16, June 23, Oct. 10, 1988.Guide to the Steamtown Collection. Bellows Falls, Vt.: Steamtown Foundation, n.d. (c. 1973), Item No. 9 and locomotive roster.
- Kean, Randolph. The Railfan's Guide to Museum & Park Displays. Forty Fort: Harold E. Cox, Publisher, 1973: 173.
- Kendrick, Baynard. "Florida's Perpetual Forests." Typescript, Florida Agricultural Museum, Tallahassee, Florida: 57–58, 72–75, 112, 125–161. [This is the principal source of information on the lumber companies that owned the locomotive.]
- Koch, Michael. Steam and Thunder in the Timber: Saga of the Forest Railroads. Denver: World Press, 1979: 225, 335, 338, 342, 349, 350, 357.
- Lawson, Thomas Jr. Letter to author, Nov. 9, 1988.
- Moody, John. Moody's Manual of Investments, Industrial Securities, 1928. New York: Moody's Investors' Service, Inc., 1928: 701, 702.
- Odegard, Gordon. "Baldwin 2-6-2 Logging Locomotive: An Early 20th Century Prairie-type for the Industrial Lumber Co." Model Railroader, Vol. 54, No. 10 (Oct. 1987): 114–115. [Article accompanied by measured drawings of a 2-6-2 similar to Brooks-Scanlon No. 1, drawn by Ed Gebhardt.]
- Pettengill, George W. Jr. "Florida Woodburners." Trains, Vol. 11, No. 5 (Mar. 1951): 12–15.
- Steamtown Engine Roster, September 1967." Bulletin of the National Railway Historical Society, Vol. 33, No. 1 (1968): 8.
- Steamtown News, Fall 1970: 1, 2.
