= Blount Fine Foods =

American food producer

- Company type: Private
- Headquarters: Fall River, Massachusetts, USA
- Key people: Todd Blount (CEO and President)
- Products: seafood products, artisan soups, prepared foods
- Website: www.blountfinefoods.com

Blount Fine Foods, formerly Blount Seafood, is a prepared foods and soup manufacturer that produces wholesale frozen and fresh soups under the Blount brand as well as Panera Bread and Legal Sea Foods. Blount Fine Foods is headquartered in Fall River, Massachusetts with a production facility in Warren, Rhode Island.

== History ==
Blount Seafood Corporation was founded by F. Nelson Blount, whose family was involved in the shellfish industry since the 1880s. After a 1938 hurricane devastated the oyster business in Narragansett Bay, Blount helped introduce the bay quahog, (a hard-shell clam), as a source of protein during the Second World War. In 1946, he entered the food-processing industry and consolidated several smaller shellfish firms to found the company, which provided chopped clams to soup manufacturers throughout the United States. The corporation changed its name to Blount Fine Foods, Inc. in 2008. Todd Blount has served as president and CEO since 2000, and is the third generation of the Blount family to lead the company. In 2004, Blount Fine Foods expanded from its Warren location to include a headquarters facility in Fall River, Massachusetts.

In October 2010, the company installed an energy efficient refrigeration system, eco-friendly water filtration system, and solar panels as part of the company’s project to keep the business green.

In 2011, Blount Fine Foods completed an expansion project that added 58,000 square feet to the pre-existing 65,000 square feet Fall River site. The company no longer processes seafood and has focused its business model to offer artisan prepared foods and introduced a line of prepared sides and sauces. In addition, Blount Fine Foods has opened its retail branch, such as Blount Clam Shack and Soup Bar. In December 2011, the company received the Refrigerated Foods Processor of the Year award by Refrigerated & Frozen Foods magazine.

In 2013, the company launched a line of single-serving soups and macaroni and cheese.

In 2016, the company acquired Food Source, LP in McKinney, Texas.
