= Bullard Company 2 =

Preserved American 0-4-0ST steam locomotive

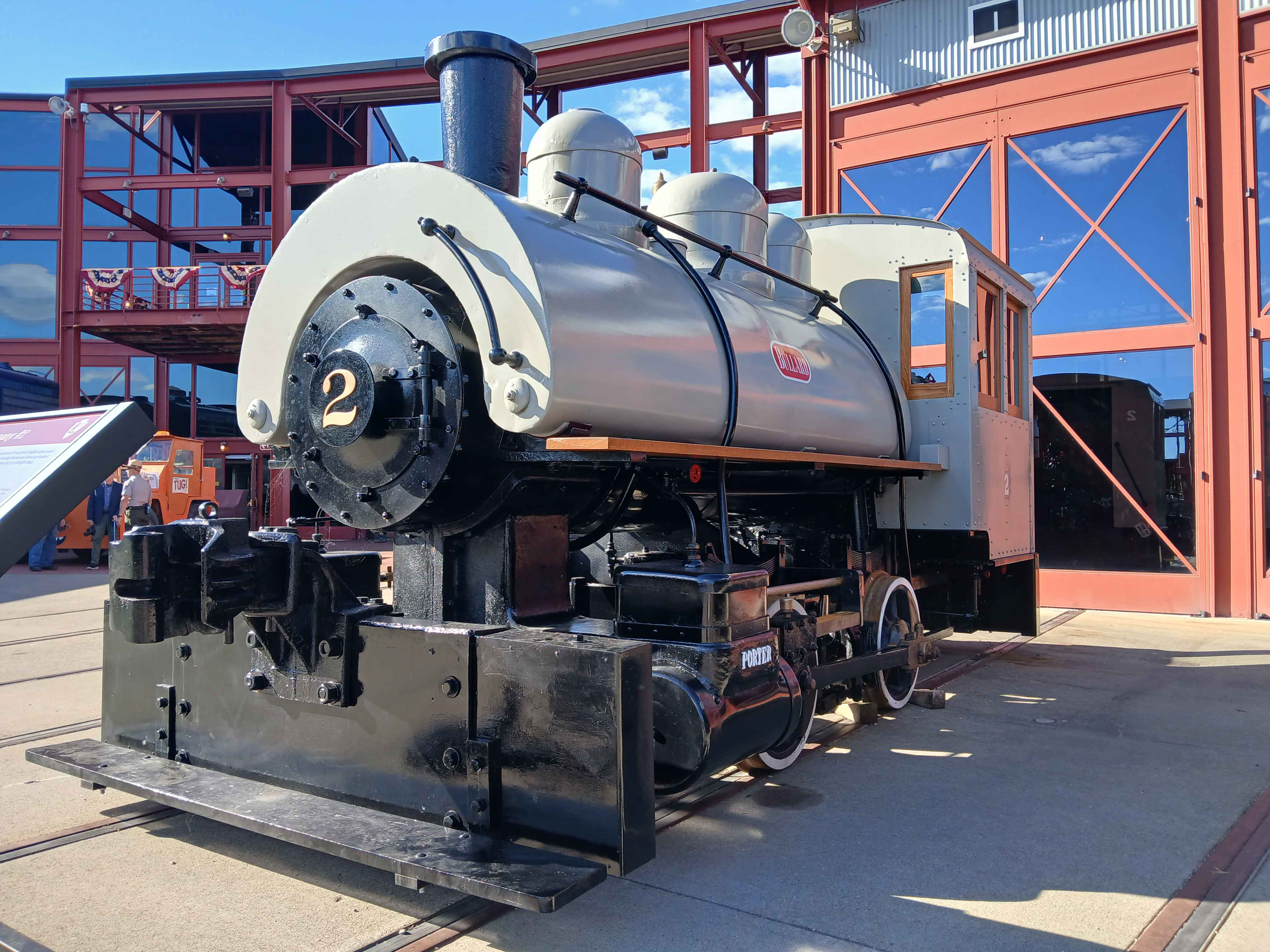
- Bullard Company No. 2 on display at the Steamtown National Historic Site in August 2025
Type and origin
- Power type: Steam
- Builder: H. K. Porter, Inc
- Serial number: 7250
- Build date: October 1937
Specifications
- Configuration
  - Whyte: 0-4-0ST
  - AAR: B
  - UIC: B n2t
- Gauge: 4 ft 8 1/2 in (1,435 mm)
- Driver dia.: 26 in (660 mm)
- Wheelbase: 4 ft 6 in (1.37 m)
- Loco weight: 30,000 lb (13,607.8 kg; 13.6 t)
- Fuel type: Oil
- Fuel capacity: 100 US gal (380 L; 83 imp gal)
- Water cap.: 450 US gal (1,700 L; 370 imp gal)
- Boiler pressure: 170 lbf/in^{2} (1.17 MPa)
- Cylinders: Two, outside
- Cylinder size: 9 in × 14 in (229 mm × 356 mm)
- Loco brake: Air
- Train brakes: Air
Performance figures
- Tractive effort: 6,180 lbf (27.5 kN)
Career
- Operators: Bullard Machine Tool Company
- Numbers: BMTC 2
- Retired: June 1963
- Restored: June 2025 (cosmetically)
- Current owner: Steamtown National Historic Site
- Disposition: On static display

Bullard Company No. 2 is an 0-4-0ST steam tank locomotive which is preserved at the Steamtown National Historic Site (NHS).

== History ==
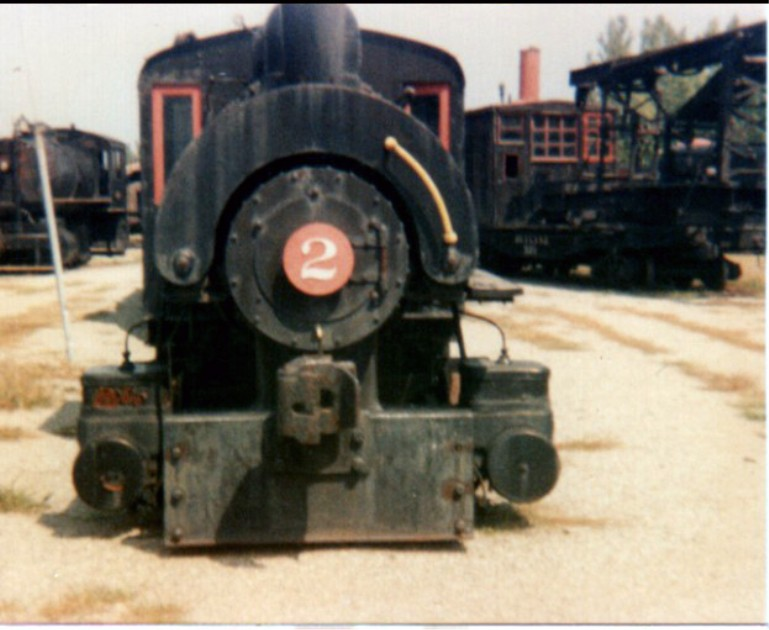
No. 2 on display at Steamtown USA in Bellow Falls, Vermont in 1974

No. 2 was built by H. K. Porter, Inc in October 1937 and spent its working career as an industrial switcher for the Bullard Machine Tool Company in Bridgeport, Connecticut. The locomotive joined the Steamtown, U.S.A. collection in Bellows Falls, Vermont in June 1963 after being purchased by Nelson Blount from the American Machinery Corp, a used locomotive dealer, who had purchased it from the Bullard Machine Tool Company sometime during the 1950s and 1960s. It is now housed in inoperable condition at the Steamtown National Historic Site (NHS) in Scranton, Pennsylvania. It is among the smallest standard gauge locomotives in the world, being no larger than an average car. It was designed for one-man operation and as such burns oil instead of coal while carrying its water in a saddle tank. In June 2025, the locomotive was cosmetically restored and made its public debut in July.
