= Scranton Iron Furnaces =

Historic site in Scranton, Pennsylvania

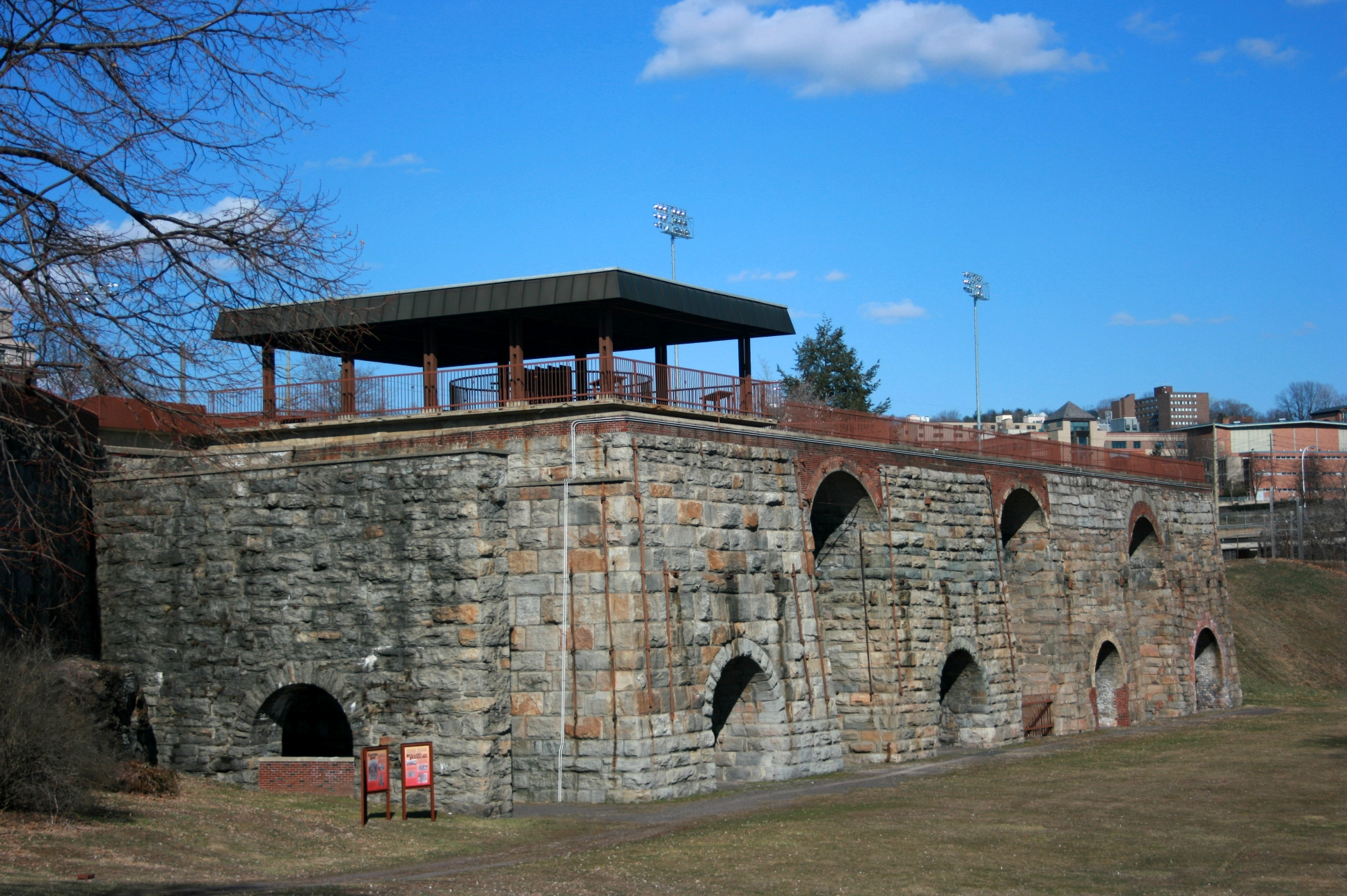
- Remains of the Scranton Iron Furnaces' stone blast furnaces
- Location: Scranton, Pennsylvania, U.S.
- Coordinates: 41°24′16″N 75°39′45″W
- Type: Industrial history
- Website: www.anthracitemuseum.org
- Lackawanna Iron and Coal Company Furnace
- U.S. National Register of Historic Places
- Location: 159 Cedar Ave., Scranton, Pennsylvania, U.S.
- Area: 3.8 acres (1.5 ha)
- Built: 1848
- Architectural style: Iron furnace
- MPS: Iron and Steel Resources of Pennsylvania MPS
- NRHP reference No.: 91001126
- Added to NRHP: September 6, 1991

The Scranton Iron Furnaces is an historic manufacturing site located in Scranton, Pennsylvania, United States. The site preserves Pennsylvania's rich iron making history. It is near the Steamtown National Historic Site in Scranton.

The site has been managed by the Pennsylvania Historical and Museum Commission since 1971 and is part of the Pennsylvania Anthracite Heritage Museum complex. It was added to the National Register of Historic Places in 1991, as the Lackawanna Iron and Coal Company Furnace.

== History ==
=== 19th century ===
This historic site preserves the remains of four stone blast furnaces that were built between 1848 and 1857. Iron production on the site was started by Scranton, Grant & Company in 1840. Later, the furnaces were operated by the Lackawanna Iron and Coal Company.

In 1847, iron rails for the Erie Railroad were made at the site. By 1865, Scranton, Grant & Company had the largest iron production capacity in the United States.

In 1875, steel production was initiated at the site. By 1880, the furnaces produced 125,000 tons of pig iron, one of the main uses of which was the manufacture of t-rails.

=== 20th century ===
In 1902, the plant was closed when production was shifted to Lackawanna, New York.

The site has been managed by the Pennsylvania Historical and Museum Commission since 1971 and is part of the Pennsylvania Anthracite Heritage Museum complex. It was added to the National Register of Historic Places in 1991, as the Lackawanna Iron and Coal Company Furnace.

=== 21st century ===
During the 2000 U.S. presidential election campaign, former U.S. vice president Al Gore held a campaign rally at the site.
