= Pennsylvania Anthracite Heritage Museum =

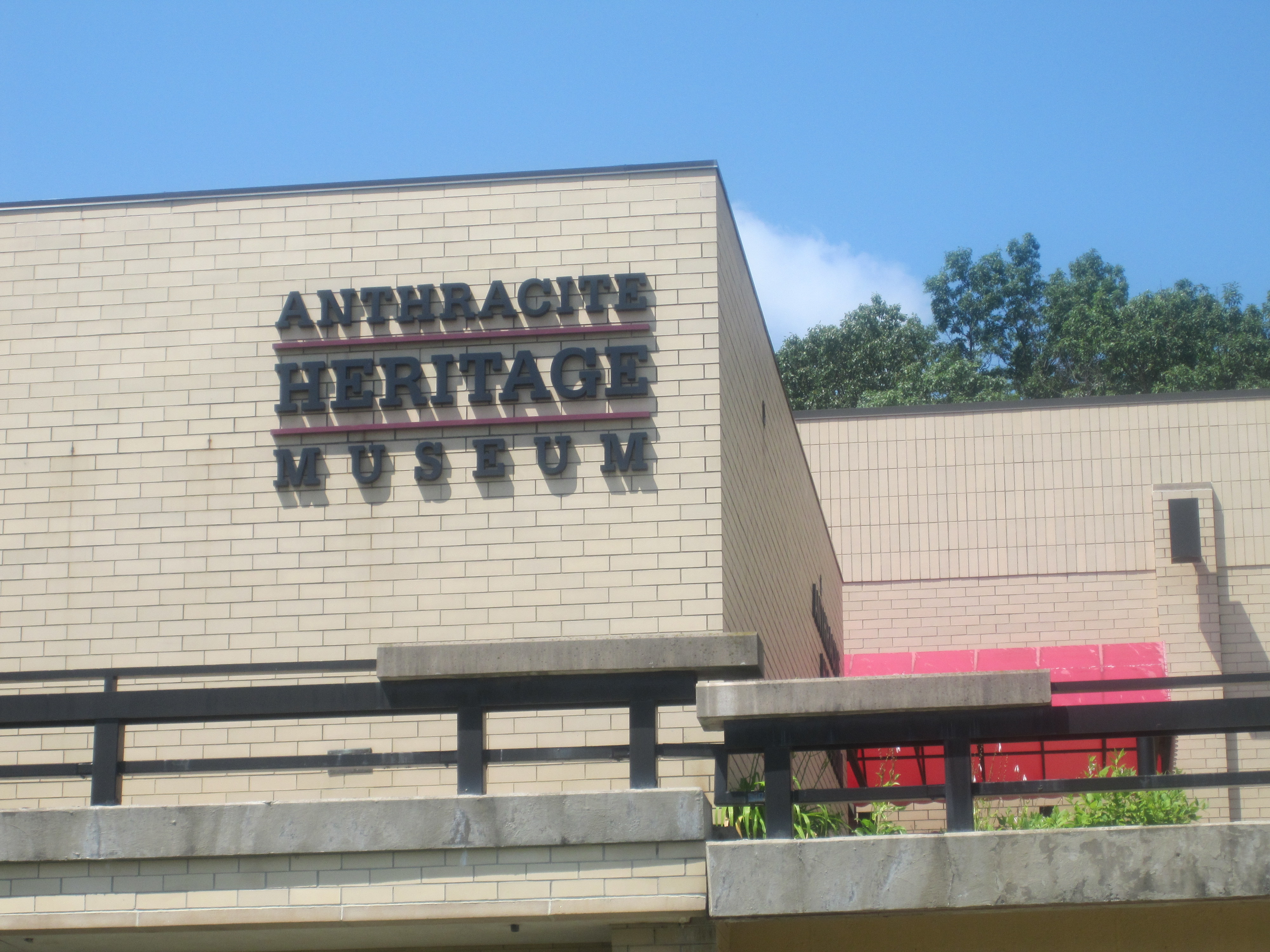
- Anthracite Heritage Museum in Scranton, Pennsylvania
- Established: 1971; 55 years ago
- Location: 22 Bald Mountain Road, Scranton, Pennsylvania 18504, United States
- Coordinates: 41.4153°N 75.7132°W
- Type: Coal industry museum
- Website: www.anthracitemuseum.org

The Pennsylvania Anthracite Heritage Museum preserves the heritage of anthracite coal mining in the U.S. State of Pennsylvania and is located in McDade Park in Scranton. It features exhibits detailing the industrial history of northeastern Pennsylvania.

== History and notable features ==
This museum is part of Anthracite Museum Complex and was created in 1971 by the Pennsylvania Historical and Museum Commission, which includes three museums and one historical site:

- The Pennsylvania Anthracite Heritage Museum and the Scranton Iron Furnaces, both in Scranton, Lackawanna County
- Eckley Miners' Village near Weatherly, Luzerne County
- The Museum of Anthracite Mining overlooking the community of Ashland in Schuylkill County

A few museum exhibits are also located at the companion Lackawana Coal Mine Tour.

== In popular culture ==
The Pennsylvania Anthracite Heritage Museum was featured on The Office episode "The Merger" in Michael and Dwight's parody of Lazy Sunday.
