= Lackawanna Coal Mine Tour =

Museum in Scranton, Pennsylvania

Lackawanna Coal Mine

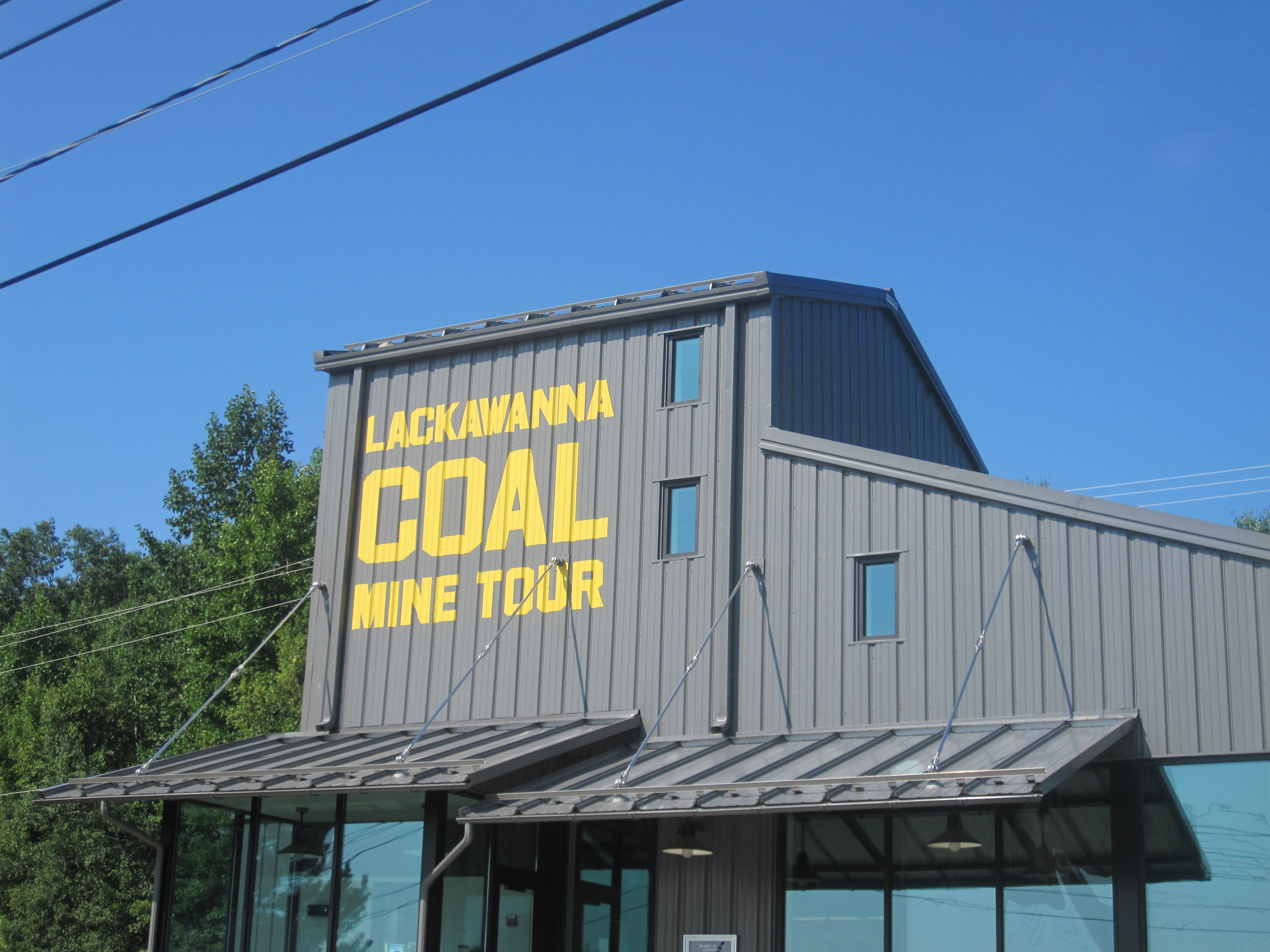
- Lackawanna Coal Mine museum in Scranton, Pennsylvania in June 2009
- Established: 1985
- Location: Bald Mountain Rd, McDade Park, Scranton, Pennsylvania, U.S.
- Coordinates: 41°25′00″N 75°42′55″W
- Type: Mining, industrial history
- Website: coalminetournepa.com

Lackawanna Coal Mine is a museum and retired coal mine that is located in McDade Park in Scranton, Pennsylvania. It opened in 1903.

== History ==
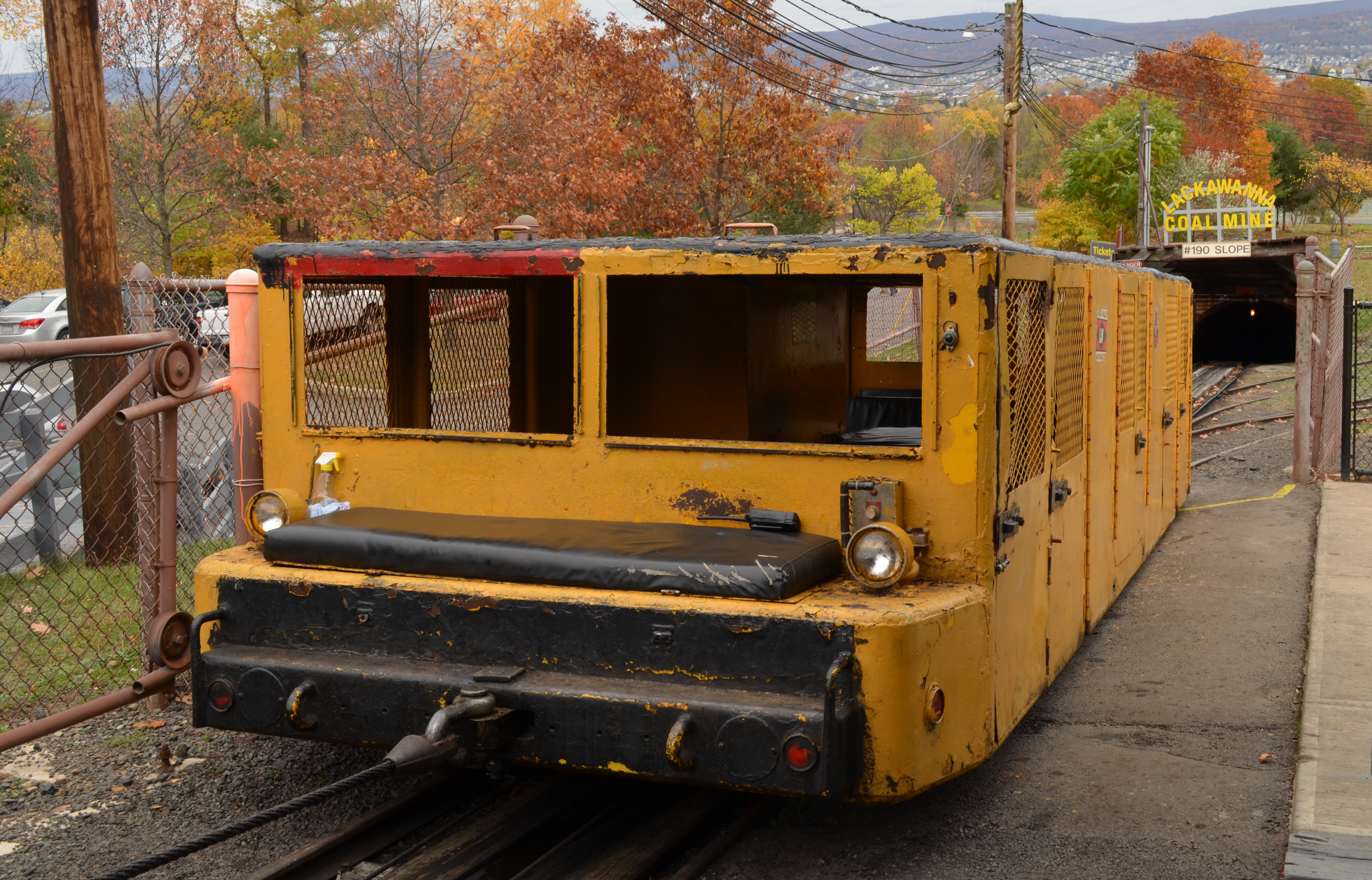
The Mantrip car, which carries visitors into the mine

Scranton, Pennsylvania and Lackawanna County is part of the northern field of the Coal Region of Pennsylvania. In the 19th and early 20th centuries, many Europeans immigrated to the area to work in the mines.

In 1903, the Continental Coal Company opened the Lackawanna Coal Mine.

After operating for more than half a century, this mine was closed in 1966 and lay abandoned until 1978. That year, the mine was converted to a museum, supported by $2.5 million in U.S. federal government funding. Restoration included the removal of debris, the laying of track to enable a mine car to carry visitors into the mine, the installation of electricity for lights, and the reinforcement of the mine's shafts with steel buttresses to improve safety prior to the museum's opening in 1985.

In 1987, Lackawanna County received a $300,000 state grant to build a 2,500-square-foot (230 m^{2}) museum building to house exhibits and artifacts. The addition is called the Shifting Shanty, a name used to describe the area where miners showered after a shift.

Adjacent to the mine tour is the Pennsylvania Anthracite Heritage Museum with exhibits on Northeastern Pennsylvania's mining and industrial history. The museum is run by Lackawanna County.

== Museum tour ==
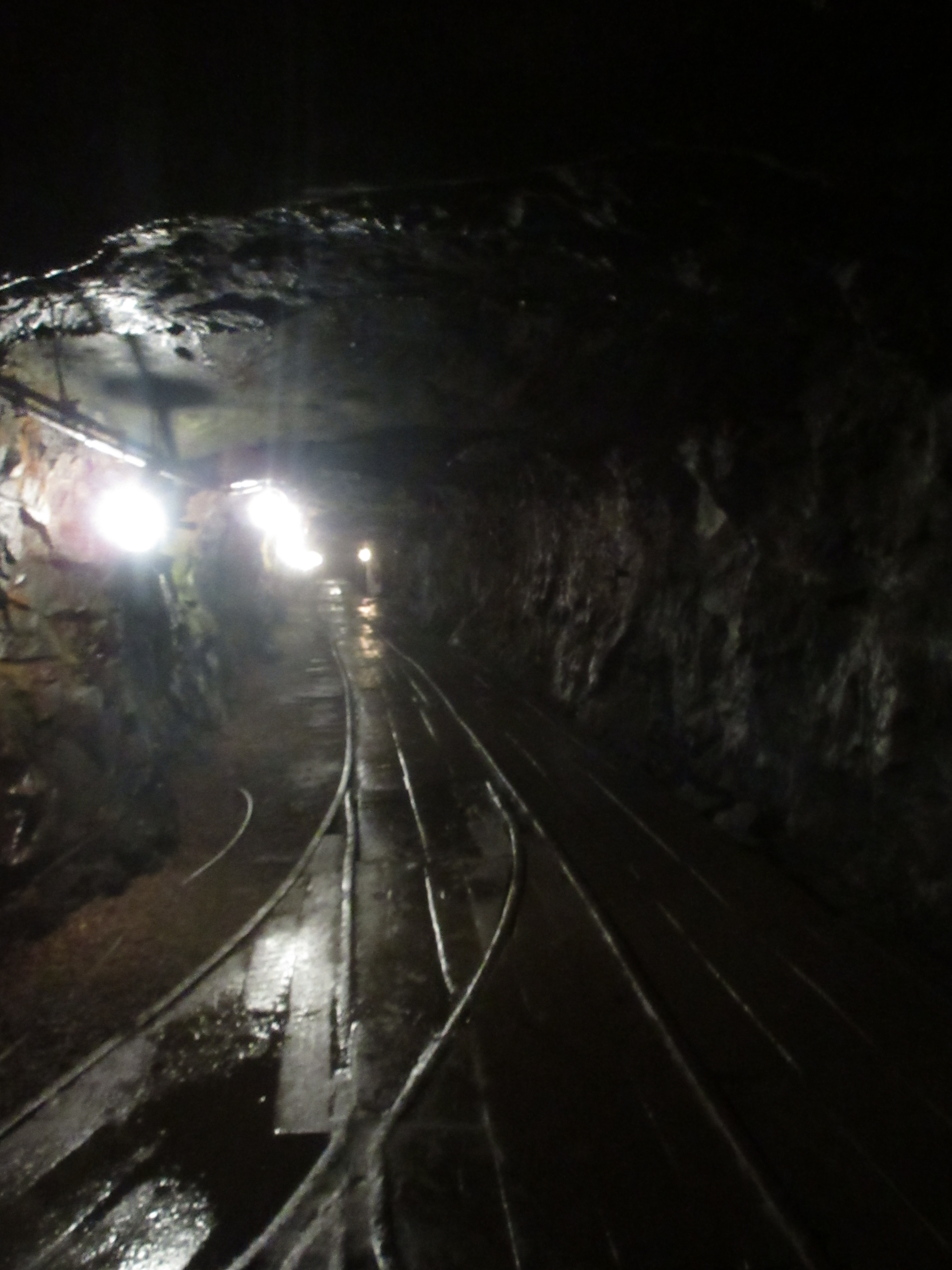
Inside the Lackawanna Coal Mine

The purpose of the mine is to give visitors a feeling for what it was like to work in an underground mine. The tours are led by former miners, or children of miners.

Visitors board a mine car and descend the #190 slope, about 250 ft (76 m) below ground, into the Clark Vein of coal. The tour proceeds, on foot, through several twisting veins of the abandoned mine.

During the tour, the tour guides describe various aspects of the anthracite mining industry in Pennsylvania including the file of the fire boss, air doors and their role in ventilation, door boys or nippers, second means of exit from the mine, and the company store. The temperatures within the mine are around a constant of 50–54 °F (10–12 °C).

== In popular culture ==
=== The Man in the High Castle (TV series) ===
In 2018 and 2019, Lackawanna Coal Mine is featured in seasons 3 and 4 of the television adaptation of The Man in the High Castle, where is it is depicted as having an artificial portal to parallel worlds.

=== The Office ===
In 2005, in season one of The Office, Michael Scott is seen attempting to organize a field trip for his office to the museum under the assumption that the elevator that takes visitors down into the mine is a ride analogous to a roller-coaster drop instead of the slow and prolonged descent into an industrial coal mining facility that it actually was.
