= McDade Park =

Park in Scranton, Pennsylvania, U.S.

- Interactive map of McDade Park
- Type: Park
- Location: Scranton, Pennsylvania
- Coordinates: 41.41677°N 75.71238°W
- Operator: City of Scranton
- Status: Open all year

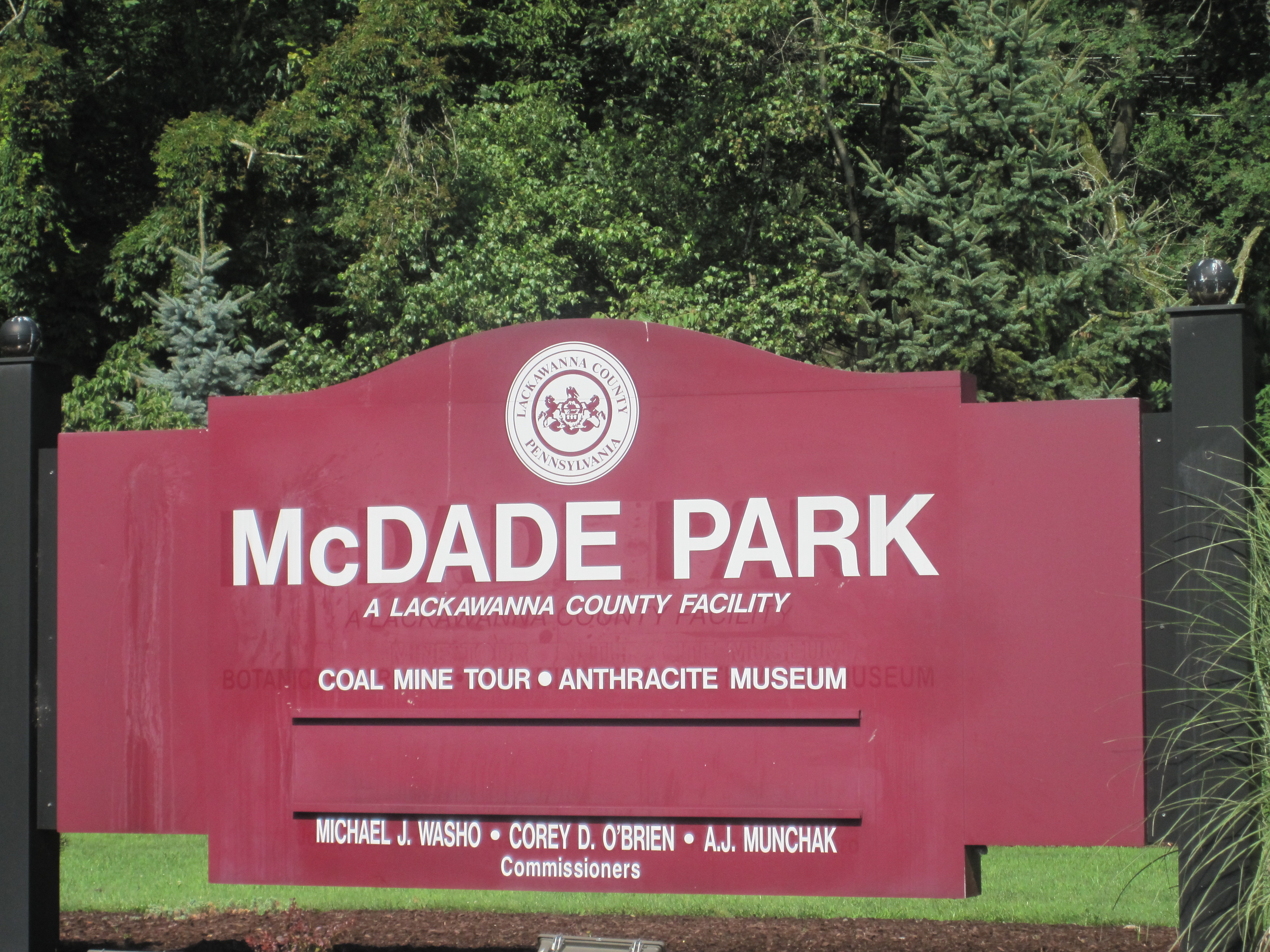
Entrance sign to McDade Park in Scranton, Pennsylvania

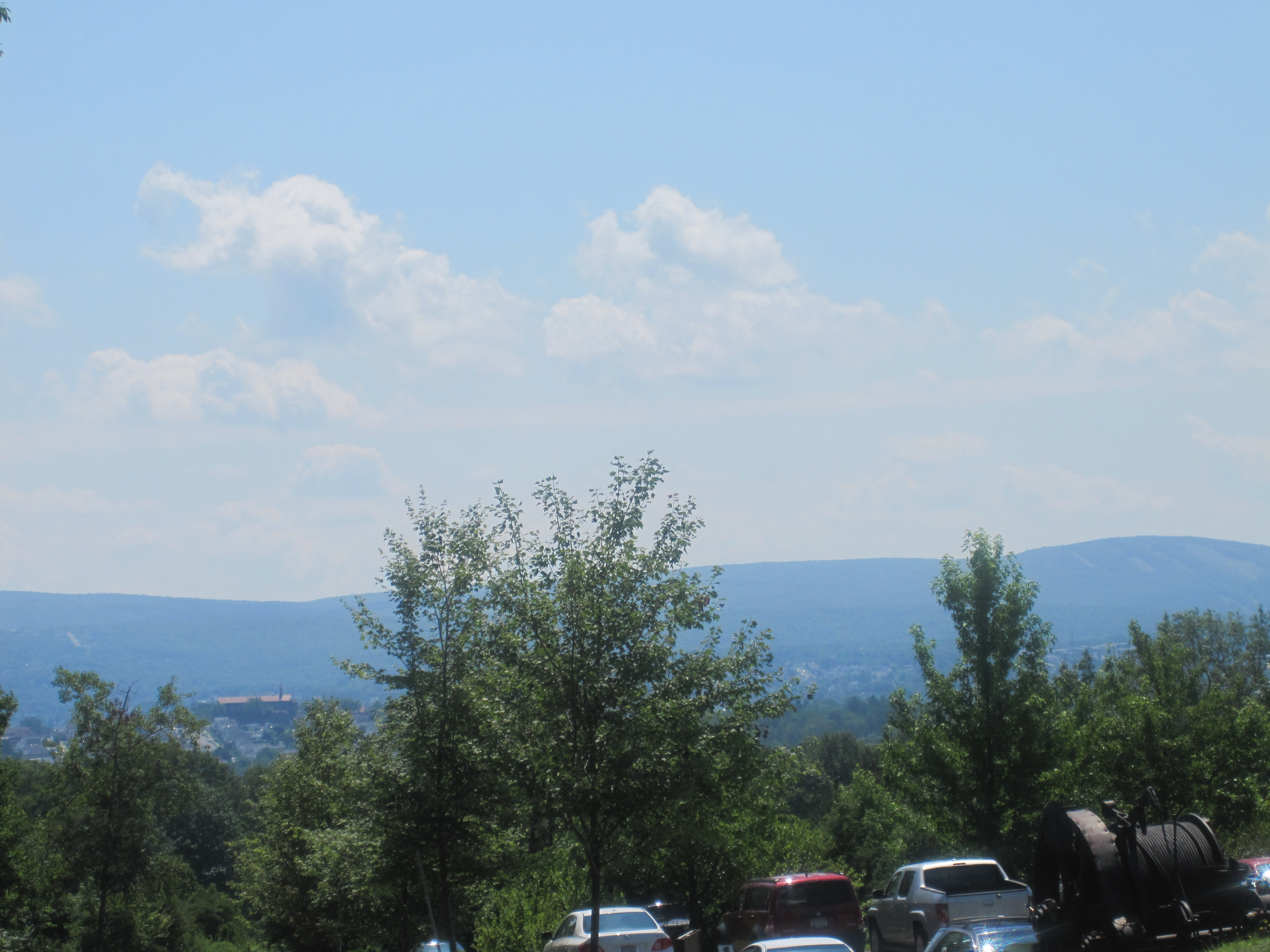
Appalachian scenery at McDade Park

McDade Park is a community park located in Scranton in Lackawanna County, in northeastern Pennsylvania. It is named after former U.S. Representative Joseph M. McDade. The park is located on 200 acres (0.81 km^{2}) of land, containing an outdoor pool, a fishing pond as well as a more isolated pond, basketball courts, hiking trails, tennis courts and two picnic pavilions. The park also contains an arboretum and numerous natural gardens. In addition, the park has a children's playground area, a creek, two baseball fields and numerous hills which are ideal for sledding during northeastern Pennsylvania's winter season. The park has free admission for all activities.

== Coal mine tour ==
The Lackawanna Coal Mine Tour is located in the heart of the park. The hour-long tour takes you to a mine that was originally part of the Continental Coal Mine which was once an active anthracite coal mine. Visitors take a mine car 300 feet (91 m) underground into the shaft and then walk the tour, totaling about a quarter of a mile. The mine temperature is often significant different than the outside temperature (approximately 50 °F (10 °C), year round). Tour dates are seven days a week from April 1 to November 30, closing only for Thanksgiving Day and Easter Sunday. Admission is charged for the tour.

== Anthracite museum ==
The Pennsylvania Anthracite Heritage Museum is also located in the park and tells the story of the people who came from Europe to work in the anthracite coal mines and the textile industry. Through exhibits and attractions the museum provides insight into the industrial history of the area. The museum is open year round Monday through Saturday 9:00 A.M. to 5:00 P.M. and Sundays 12:00 P.M. to 5:00 P.M., with the exception of New Year's Day, Dr. Martin Luther King Day, Presidents' Day, Columbus Day, Veterans' Day, Thanksgiving Day, the day following Thanksgiving, and Christmas Day. Admission is charged for the museum.
