= F. Nelson Blount =

American businessman

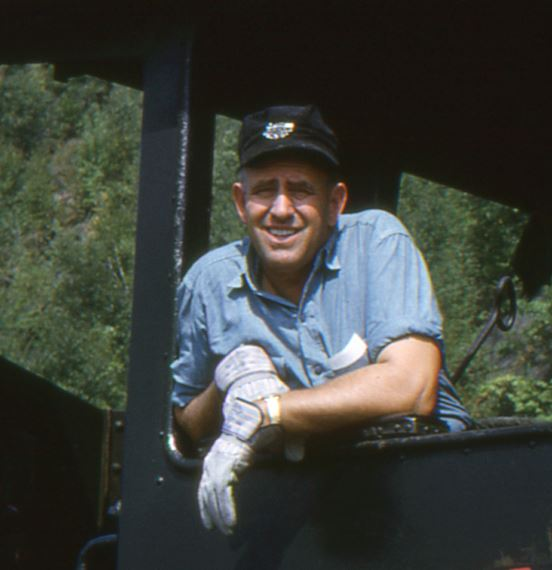
- F. Nelson Blount at North Walpole, NH, 1963.
- Born: Francis Nelson Blount; May 21, 1918; Warren, Rhode Island, U.S.
- Died: August 31, 1967 (aged 49); Marlborough, New Hampshire, U.S.
- Resting place: Dublin Cemetery
- Occupations: Businessman; railroad enthusiast; railroad collector
- Years active: 1946–1967
- Spouse: Ruth Palmer (m. 1942)
- Children: 5

Signature
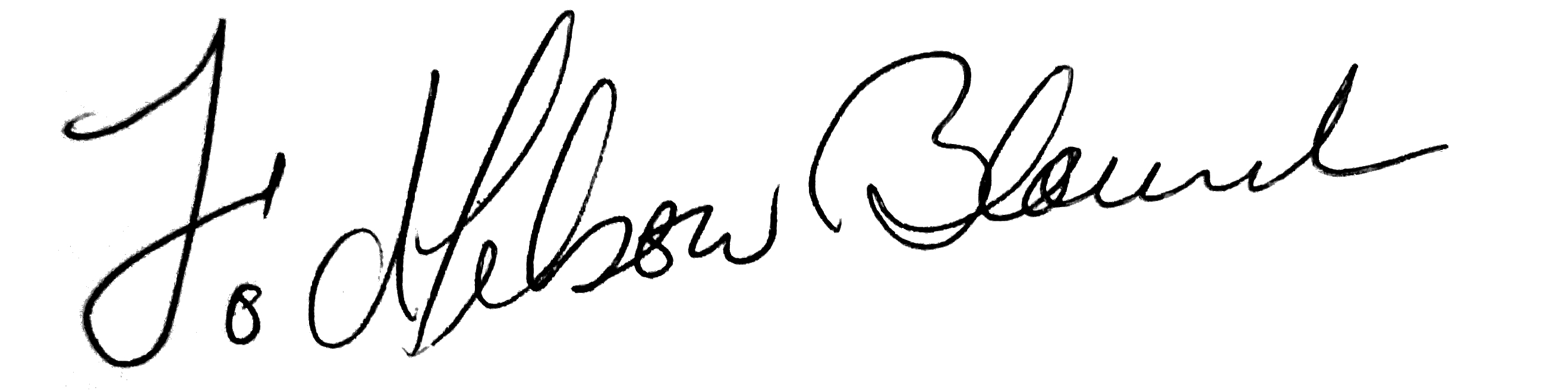

Francis Nelson Blount (May 21, 1918 – August 31, 1967) was an American businessman, railroad enthusiast, and president and founder of Blount Seafood Corporation and the founder of Steamtown, U.S.A.; the Monadnock, Steamtown & Northern Railroad; and the Green Mountain Railroad. Blount’s collection of vintage steam locomotives and rail cars—one of the largest ever assembled—today forms the core of Steamtown National Historic Site in Scranton, Pennsylvania.

== Biography ==
Francis Nelson Blount was born May 21, 1918, in Warren, Rhode Island, to Willis and Ruth Blount. Willis had established an ice company in neighboring Barrington in 1919. As a child, Nelson and his brother Luther helped their father at the family business. He also frequented the New York, New Haven and Hartford Railroad yard near his home, developing a fondness for steam locomotives and railroads.

On May 23, 1933, just after his fifteenth birthday, Blount skipped school to see the British steamer Royal Scot, which was on exhibition in Providence, Rhode Island. There he happened upon schoolmate Frederick H. Richardson, a fellow railroad enthusiast, and the two became lifelong friends. Richardson would later serve as an employee and business partner for Blount. In 1938, the two co-wrote one of the first popular railfan books, Along the Iron Trail. They frequently visited the two-foot narrow gauge railroads of Maine, particularly the Sandy River & Rangeley Lakes Railroad and the Bridgton & Harrison Railroad. The 1935 abandonment of the Sandy River & Rangeley Lakes, and their helplessness to stop it, had a deep emotional impact on them. They began to discuss ways to save the memory of steam railroading.

Richardson enlisted in the Coast Guard when the United States entered the World War II. Nelson had wanted to enlist in the Navy, yet a leg injury and a broken back suffered when falling off a wharf had triggered a return of his childhood undulant fever in 1939, and he was declared unfit for service. On October 10, 1942, Blount married Ruth Palmer, whose mother had been a high-school classmate of Nelson's parents. The two had five children and began a family, which Blount supported by supplying ice to the many military camps in the Rhode Island and Cape Cod areas.

Blount's family had been involved in the shellfish industry since the 1880s. After the 1938 hurricane devastated the oyster business in Rhode Island's Narragansett Bay, Nelson and his uncle Byron helped introduce the bay quahog (a hard-shell clam) as a source of protein. After trials, the quahog was approved for military consumption, and demand exploded. In 1943, Blount purchased the Narragansett Oyster Company for $9,856 and renamed it the Narragansett Bay Packing Company. After the war in 1946, he consolidated several smaller shellfish firms to found Blount Seafood Corporation, which provided chopped clams to soup manufacturers throughout the United States, including Campbell Soup. His family still owns and controls the company. Upon returning from the Coast Guard, Richardson joined Blount at the seafood company.

In the 1950s, Blount moved his family from Rhode Island to the Monadnock region of New Hampshire, settling in Dublin, New Hampshire, at what he called "Staghead Farm".

== Locomotive collection ==
In the mid-1950s, Blount used some of the money that he made in the seafood industry to purchase the narrow gauge Edaville Railroad in South Carver, Massachusetts. The Edaville Railroad had narrow-gauge engines from Maine, and Blount soon began acquiring standard-gauge steam locomotives and cars, in part to save a vanishing technological heritage. Some locomotives were initially displayed at Engine City, a part of Pleasure Island amusement park near Wakefield, Massachusetts. Space constraints soon forced Blount to look for a new home for his collection, and he purchased an engine house and railroad yard in 1960 from the Boston and Maine Railroad in North Walpole, New Hampshire, with equipment arriving there in late 1960. By 1964, he displayed in North Walpole 25 steam locomotives from the United States and Canada, 10 other locomotives, and 25 pieces of rolling stock; one of the largest collections of antique steam locomotives in the United States.

== Monadnock, Steamtown & Northern Railroad ==
On April 26, 1961, Blount and his associates founded a standard-gauge tourist excursion railroad, the Monadnock, Steamtown & Northern, to provide the steam train rides. Blount had hoped to operate on the Boston & Maine's Cheshire Branch between North Walpole and Keene, but B&M labor issues led to the first MS&N trains briefly operating on the Claremont and Concord Railway in the summer of 1961. In 1962, Blount's MS&N finally operated between Keene and Gilboa while he discussed a state-funded Steamtown, U.S.A. opening in Keene. The MS&N later operated out of North Walpole in 1963, and in Vermont between 1964 and 1967. The MS&N ceased operations just after Blount's untimely death, and was dissolved in August 1971.

== Steamtown, U.S.A. ==
Blount envisioned his collection as the cornerstone to a grand museum at North Walpole, to be called "Steamtown, U.S.A". He first planned to open this museum at his North Walpole facility, but soon diverted his attention to Keene to allow for a larger museum space. Blount hoped to commit the state of New Hampshire to fund the museum's construction and offered 20 of his steam locomotives as an incentive; meanwhile, he would control the Monadnock, Steamtown & Northern, which was to be the separate excursion operator on the B&M Cheshire Branch. Local and state support was initially strong, but delays on a sale of the Cheshire Branch and some negative press in the state led to the newly elected state government killing the Keene plans in early 1963. Promised support for Steamtown from the state of New Hampshire never materialized, leading to yet another move back to North Walpole in 1963. This was the first year that the collection was open to the public (as opposed to just MS&N train rides), and soon it was decided that the North Walpole site was too small for the many visitors who came.

With state interest waning, Blount established the "Steamtown Foundation for the Preservation of Steam and Railroad Americana", a non-profit charitable, educational organization to acquire his collection and operate the museum. This also allowed donations of locomotives and rolling stock to be accepted, such as Union Pacific 4012 in 1964. Steamtown U.S.A. opened for the first time as a museum at North Walpole in 1963, and the MS&N ran excursions again over the Cheshire Branch—this time from North Walpole to Westmoreland. Blount also entered into talks with the state of Vermont to assume control of abandoned former Rutland Railroad tracks and property between Bellows Falls and Rutland. This provided a safe home for the Monadnock, Steamtown & Northern excursions and ample room for the Steamtown, U.S.A. museum to develop. Between 1964 and 1966, Steamtown, U.S.A. began to move to Riverside. Blount envisioned a 40-stall roundhouse, a station, yard tracks, steamboat operations on the Connecticut River, and a model New England village complete with a country church and electric street railway. In 1964 and 1965, Blount established the Green Mountain Railroad to provide freight service to the beleaguered on-line customers and employ his excursion staff in the off season.

By 1967 Blount planned to distance himself from the business affairs of the Steamtown Foundation, hoping to find a replacement as chairman and focus mainly on being a steam locomotive engineer. His sudden death on August 31, 1967, was unexpected and, without his personal funds, Steamtown fell on hard times. Nearly all of his development plans for the site in Vermont went unfulfilled and the harsh winters helped speed deterioration of much of the collection. Steamtown moved to Scranton, Pennsylvania, in 1984 and soon after went bankrupt. In 1986, the federal government stepped in and established the Steamtown National Historic Site to save the collection; the park officially opened in 1995.

== Religion ==
In the 1960s, Blount became a devoted evangelical Christian. A biography entitled The Man from Steamtown was written by James R. Adair in 1967 which focuses heavily on his spiritual life. Blount sought to preserve an evangelical Christian legacy by donating his Dublin, New Hampshire, homestead and its surrounding farm buildings, pastures, and forest to a group of committed Christian educators in 1964, headed by Mel Moody, who worked together to develop Staghead Farm (as it was then called) into Dublin Christian Academy, a combined elementary school and secondary boarding school.

== Death ==
After operating a day of steam excursions on August 31, 1967, Blount was flying from Steamtown to his home in Dublin when his Maule Rocket, a new plane with only thirty hours of flying time, crashed near Marlborough, New Hampshire, during an emergency landing caused by fuel exhaustion. Nelson was an experienced flyer and had owned many aircraft; he had performed a pre-flight check and is believed to have planned to stop at Keene Airport for refueling. Around noon the next day, September 1, two local girls—Dawn Antilla, age 14, and Laurie St. John, age 13—came across the field and ran immediately to a nearby home to call the police. The crash had been found near the border of the village of Chesham, New Hampshire, and the town of Marlborough, about 5 miles (8.0 km) from Nelson's home in Dublin.

As the plane descended its rear landing gear had buckled. The plane had bounced up and continued flying for 88 feet (27 m) down the field and into a large pine tree at the crest of the clearing. Dr. James Ballou, Cheshire County medical referee, later found no evidence of a heart attack or other illness. The possibility of major mechanical issues on the brand-new plane was investigated and ruled out.

Blount's funeral was held September 4, 1967, at 1:30 p.m. in the National Guard Armory in Peterborough, New Hampshire, just next door to Dublin. Nearly 500 people turned out to pay their respects. Following the funeral, Nelson was interred in Dublin Cemetery.
