= Pennsylvania Railroad class N2sa =

PRR N2sa (Rebuilt : N2s)
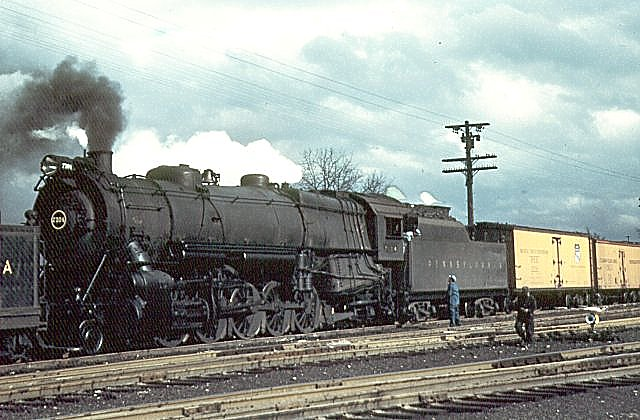
Type and origin
- Power type: Steam
- Builder: ALCO, Baldwin
- Build date: 1919 (rebuilt from 1923)
- Total produced: 130
Specifications
- Configuration
  - Whyte: 2-10-2
  - UIC: 1'E2'
- Gauge: 4 ft 8 1/2 in (1,435 mm) standard gauge
- Leading dia.: 33 in (0.84 m)
- Driver dia.: 63 in (1.60 m)
- Trailing dia.: 43 in (1.09 m)
- Wheelbase: 42 ft 2 in (12.85 m)
- Length: 55 ft 4 in (16.87 m) without tender
- Width: 10 ft 8 in (3.25 m)
- Height: 15 ft 9 in (4.80 m)
- Adhesive weight: 297,000 lb (135,000 kg)
- Loco weight: 380,700 lb (172,700 kg)
- Total weight: 458,100 lb (207,800 kg)
- Fuel type: Soft coal
- Fuel capacity: 17 short tons (15 t; 15 long tons)
- Water cap.: 12,000 US gal (45,000 L; 10,000 imp gal)
- Firebox
  - Grate area: 82.2 sq ft (7.64 m^{2})
- Boiler pressure: 190 psi (1.3 MPa)
- Heating surface
  - Firebox: 420 sq ft (39 m^{2})
  - Tubes and flues: 4,560 sq ft (424 m^{2})
  - Total surface: 4,980 sq ft (463 m^{2})
- Superheater
  - Heating area: 1,222 sq ft (113.5 m^{2})
- Cylinders: 2
- Cylinder size: 30 in × 32 in (762 mm × 813 mm)
- Valve gear: Walschaerts, Southern
Performance figures
- Maximum speed: 35 mph (56 km/h)
- Tractive effort: 74,000 lbf (329.17 kN)
- Factor of adh.: 4.01
Career
- Retired: 1947-1953
- Disposition: All scrapped

The Pennsylvania Railroad's class N2sa comprised rebuilds to PRR practice of the 130 USRA Heavy Santa Fe steam locomotives the railroad received under the auspices of the United States Railroad Administration, the nationalized central control of the nation's railroads during World War I. These locomotives, as received, were classified N2s. Rebuilds began from 1923 and all locomotives were rebuilt, classified N2sa after the rebuild. They received a Belpaire firebox, the PRR-standard smokebox front, a raised headlight following PRR practice, and the bell moved from smokebox front to boiler top. Brakemen's "doghouse" shacks were built on the rear tender decks.

Their assignments were primarily in PRR Lines West (of Pittsburgh), especially after the introduction of the I1s 2-10-0 “Decapods”. Both these and the PRR-designed N1s 2-10-2s were primarily used to haul iron ore from the ports on the Great Lakes and coal towards them, at a slow drag freight maximum speed of 35 miles per hour (56 km/h). The arrival of larger power such as the J1 shifted the N2sa locomotives to more secondary roles.
