= USRA Light Santa Fe =

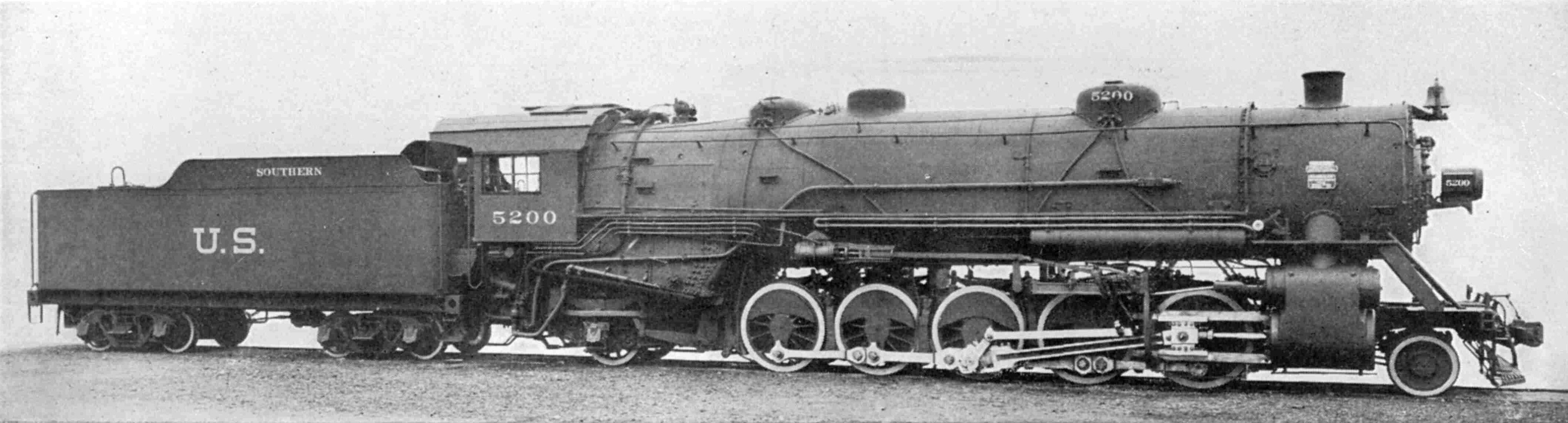
Type and origin
- Power type: Steam
- Builder: American Locomotive Company, Baldwin Locomotive Works
- Build date: 1918-1919
- Total produced: 94
Specifications
- Configuration
  - AAR: 2-10-2
  - UIC: 1′E1′ h2
- Gauge: 4 ft 8 1/2 in (1,435 mm) standard gauge
- Leading dia.: 33 in (838 mm)
- Driver dia.: 57 in (1,448 mm)
- Trailing dia.: 43 in (1,092 mm)
- Wheelbase: 40 ft 4 in (12.29 m)
- Length: 52 ft 10 in (16.10 m) without tender
- Width: 10 ft 8 in (3.25 m)
- Height: 15 ft 0 in (4.57 m)
- Adhesive weight: 276,000 lb (125,000 kilograms; 125 metric tons)
- Loco weight: 352,000 lb (160,000 kilograms; 160 metric tons)
- Tender weight: 188,300 lb (85,400 kilograms; 85.4 metric tons)
- Total weight: 540,300 lb (245,100 kilograms; 245.1 metric tons)
- Fuel type: Soft coal (bituminous)
- Firebox
  - Grate area: 76.3 sq ft (7.09 m^{2})
- Boiler pressure: 200 psi (1.38 MPa)
- Heating surface
  - Firebox: 373 sq ft (34.7 m^{2})
  - Tubes: 2,970 sq ft (275.9 m^{2})
  - Flues: 1,323 sq ft (122.9 m^{2})
  - Total surface: 4,666 sq ft (433.5 m^{2})
- Superheater
  - Heating area: 1,085 sq ft (100.8 m^{2})
- Cylinders: Two
- Cylinder size: 27 in × 32 in (686 mm × 813 mm)
- Valve gear: Southern (see drawing)
Performance figures
- Tractive effort: 69,575 lbf (309.5 kN)
- Factor of adh.: 3.94
Career
- Preserved: 1
- Scrapped: 1945-1961
- Disposition: One preserved, remainder scrapped

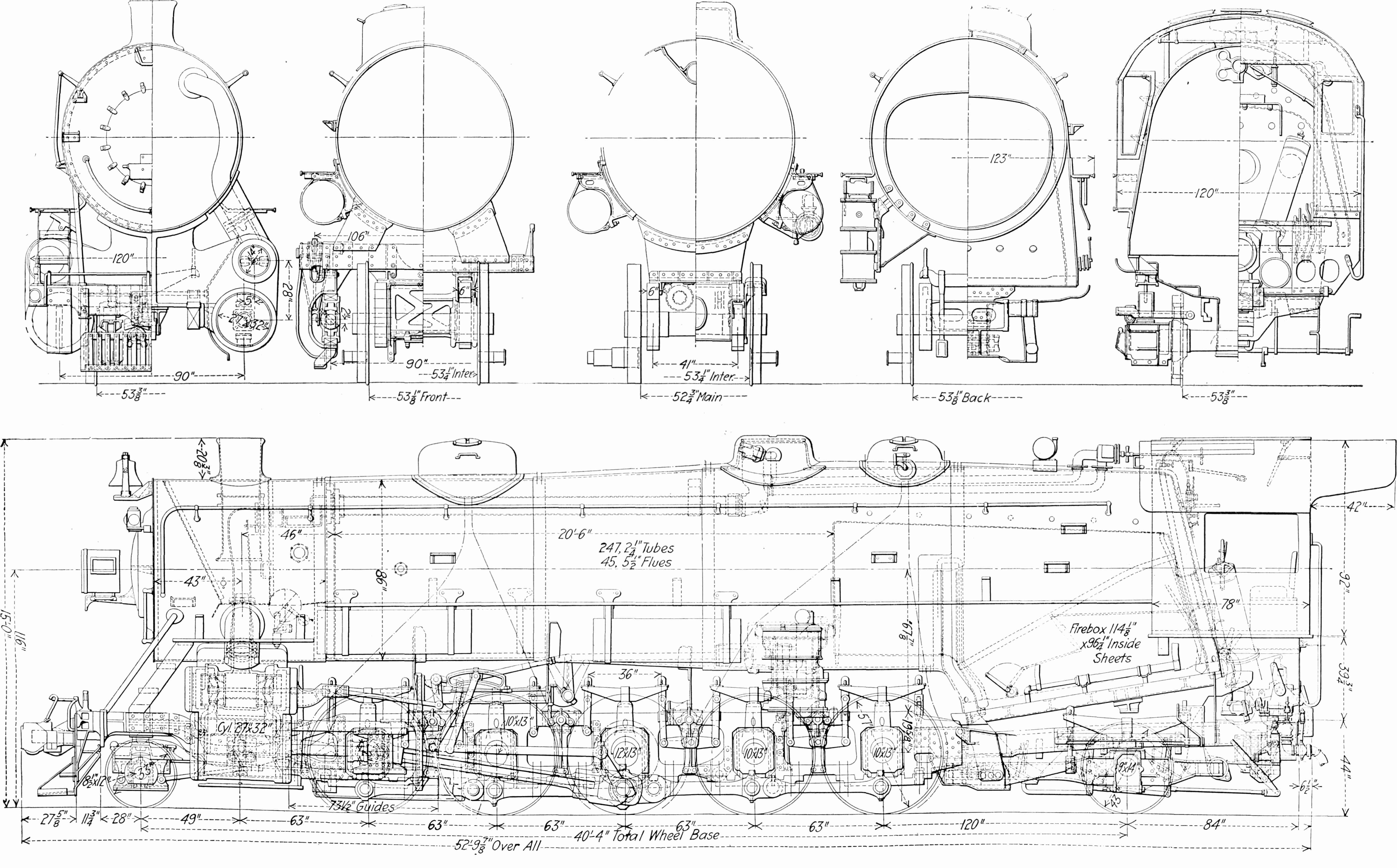
General arrangement drawing

The USRA Light Santa Fe was a USRA standard class of steam locomotive designed under the control of the United States Railroad Administration, the nationalized railroad system in the United States during World War I. These locomotives were of 2-10-2 wheel arrangement in the Whyte notation, or 1′E1′ in UIC classification; this arrangement was commonly named "Santa Fe" in the United States. At the time, the Santa Fe was the largest non-articulated type in common use, primarily in slow drag freight duty in ore or coal service.

A total of 94 of these locomotives were constructed under the auspices of the USRA. They went to the following railroads:

Table of original USRA allocation
Railroad	Quantity	Class	Road numbers	Notes
Ann Arbor Railroad	4	L	190–193	Built in 1919 by Baldwin(Renumbered 2550–2553, reclassified L2, Sold to Kansas City Southern Railway #220–223, September 1942.KCS class L-1) All scrapped between 1945-1957.
Chicago and Western Indiana Railroad	5		20-24	Built 1918 by ALCO. All scrapped between 1950-1955.
Duluth, Missabe and Northern Railway	10	E-1	506–515	Built 1919 by Brooks Works (to Duluth, Missabe and Iron Range Railroad same numbers) Scrapped between 1952-1954. One example preserved.
New York Central Railroad subsidiary Boston and Albany Railroad	10	Z-1	1100–1109	Built 1919 by ALCO-Brooks (to Canadian National Railway #4200–4209 class T-3-a in 1928.) All scrapped between 1955-1961.
Seaboard Air Line Railroad	15	B-1	485–499	Built 1919 by Baldwin (renumbered 2485–2499) All scrapped between 1950-1953.
Southern Railway	50	Ss-1	5200–5249	Built 1918 by ALCO. All scrapped between 1949 - 1952.
Total	94			

Only one USRA Light 2-10-2 survives: DM&IR 506 is on display at the National Railroad Museum in Green Bay, Wisconsin
