= Reverser =

Reverser may refer to:

- Thrust reverser
- Reversing gear, often called a reverser, controls the valves on a steam engine
- Reverser handle, an operating lever for a locomotive
