= USRA Heavy Santa Fe =

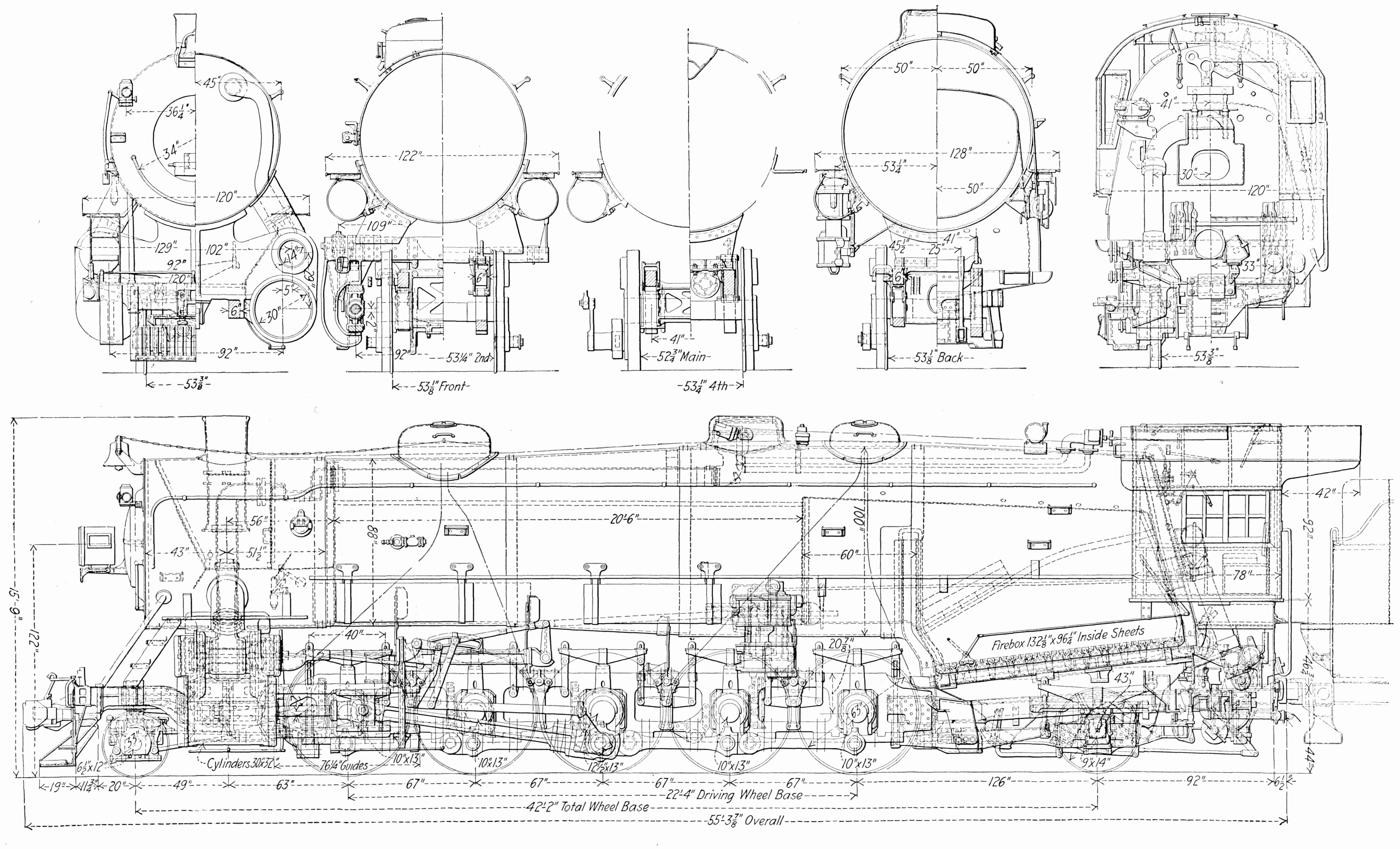
Type and origin
- Power type: Steam
- Builder: American Locomotive Company, Baldwin Locomotive Works
- Build date: 1919
- Total produced: 175
Specifications
- Configuration
  - Whyte: 2-10-2
  - UIC: 1′E1′ h2
- Gauge: 4 ft 8 1/2 in (1,435 mm) standard gauge
- Leading dia.: 33 in (838 mm)
- Driver dia.: 63 in (1,600 mm)
- Trailing dia.: 43 in (1,092 mm)
- Wheelbase: 42 ft 2 in (12.85 m)
- Length: 55 ft 4 in (16.87 m) without tender
- Width: 10 ft 8 in (3.25 m)
- Height: 15 ft 9 in (4.80 m)
- Adhesive weight: 293,000 lb (133,000 kilograms; 133 metric tons)
- Loco weight: 380,000 lb (170,000 kilograms; 170 metric tons)
- Total weight: 586,000 lb (266,000 kilograms; 266 metric tons)
- Fuel type: Soft coal (bituminous)
- Firebox
  - Grate area: 82.2 sq ft (7.64 m^{2})
- Boiler pressure: 190 psi (1.31 MPa)
- Heating surface
  - Firebox: 429 sq ft (39.9 m^{2})
  - Tubes: 3,258 sq ft (302.7 m^{2})
  - Flues: 1,469 sq ft (136.5 m^{2})
  - Total surface: 5,156 sq ft (479.0 m^{2})
- Superheater
  - Heating area: 1,230 sq ft (114.3 m^{2})
- Cylinders: Two
- Cylinder size: 30 in × 32 in (762 mm × 813 mm)
- Valve gear: Southern (see drawing)
Performance figures
- Tractive effort: 74,000 lbf (329.2 kN)
- Factor of adh.: 3.96
Career
- Disposition: All scrapped between 1953 and 1955

The USRA Heavy Santa Fe was a USRA standard class of steam locomotive designed under the control of the United States Railroad Administration, the nationalized railroad system in the United States during World War I. These locomotives were of 2-10-2 wheel arrangement in the Whyte notation, or 1′E1′ in UIC classification; this arrangement was commonly named "Santa Fe" in the United States. At the time, the Santa Fe was the largest non-articulated type in common use, primarily in slow drag freight duty in ore or coal service.

A total of 175 of these locomotives were constructed under the auspices of the USRA. They went to the following railroads:

Table of original USRA allocation
Railroad	Quantity	Class	Road numbers	Notes
Bessemer and Lake Erie Railroad	5	D2A	521–525	
Chicago, Burlington and Quincy Railroad	10	M-3	6300–6309	At times leased to the Colorado and Southern Railway
Erie Railroad	25	R-3	4200–4224	
Colorado and Southern Railway	5	E-5B	905–909	
Pennsylvania Railroad	130	N2s	Random between 7036 and 9859	
Total	175			

The Pennsylvania Railroad locomotives were later refitted with the Pennsy's trademark Belpaire fireboxes. None of the originals built under USRA auspices or any of the subsequent copies were preserved.
