= LTM 51 =

Class of Netherlands Garratt locomotive

Type and origin
- Power type: Steam
- Designer: Ir. D. Verhoop
- Builder: Henschel
- Serial number: 22063
- Model: LTM 51
- Build date: 1931
- Total produced: 1
Specifications
- Configuration
  - Whyte: 0-6-0+0-6-0
  - UIC: C-C
- Gauge: 1,435 mm (4 ft 8 1/2 in)
- Driver dia.: 900 mm (2 ft 11 in)
- Wheelbase: 14,300 mm (46 ft 11 in)
  - Axle spacing (Asymmetrical): 2,300 + 1,000 + 7,700 + 1,000 + 2,300 mm (7 ft 7 in + 3 ft 3 in + 25 ft 3 in + 3 ft 3 in + 7 ft 7 in)
  - Engine: 3,300 + 7,700 + 3,300 mm (130 + 300 + 130 in)
- Pivot centres: 9,092 mm (29 ft 10.0 in)
- Frame type: Garratt
- Loco weight: 56.7 t (55.8 long tons; 62.5 short tons) (empty), 71.5 t (70.4 long tons; 78.8 short tons) (service)
- Fuel type: Coal
- Fuel capacity: 3 t (3.0 long tons; 3.3 short tons)
- Water cap.: 7,000 L (1,500 imp gal; 1,800 US gal)
- Boiler
  - Diameter: 1,665 mm (5 ft 5.6 in)
  - Tube plates: 2,500 mm (8 ft 2 in)
  - Small tubes: 24 pieces, inside 37 mm (1.5 in), outside 41.5 mm (1.63 in)
  - Large tubes: 140 pieces, inside 64 mm (2.5 in), outside 70 mm (2.8 in)
- Boiler pressure: 13.5 kg/cm^{2} (192 psi)
- Heating surface
  - Firebox: 2.0 m^{2} (22 sq ft)
  - Tubes: 6.96 m^{2} (74.9 sq ft)
  - Arch tubes: 9.4 m^{2} (101 sq ft)
  - Flues: 70.34 m^{2} (757.1 sq ft)
  - Tubes and flues: 86.7 m^{2} (933 sq ft)
- Superheater
  - Type: superheater pipe: inside 17 mm (0.67 in), outside 22 mm (0.87 in)
  - Heating area: 41.8 m^{2} (450 sq ft)
- Cylinders: 4
- Cylinder size: 360 mm × 360 mm (14 in × 14 in)
- Valve gear: Verhoop
- Loco brake: Manual and steam
- Train brakes: Automatic Knorr air pressure, Hardy vacuum system
Performance figures
- Tractive effort: 9,800 kgf (22,000 lbf)
Career
- Operators: LTM
- Number in class: 1
- Numbers: 51
- Locale: Maastricht - Vaals, Limburg, The Netherlands
- Delivered: 1931
- First run: 1931
- Last run: 1938
- Retired: 1940

Locomotive 51 of the Limburgsche Tramweg Maatschappij was a Garratt locomotive. It was the only Garratt type locomotive in the Netherlands. The locomotive was designed for operation on the line Maastricht - Vaals, which required a locomotive with at least 5 coupled axles. A conventional locomotive of this size would experience too much rolling resistance in the many curves on this line, which were typical tramway curves of small radius.

== History ==
It was built by Henschel with builder number 22063 in 1931. It entered service in the same year. Ir. D. Verhoop, in collaboration with Hanomag, is the likely designer of the locomotive. Builder number 10758 was reserved by Hanomag. The locomotive was completed after the take-over of Hanomag by Henschel. After the Maastricht-Vaals line was closed the locomotive was sold to Dotremont in Maastricht in 1938. Technisch Bureau Groen (The Hague) bought the machine in 1940, and sold the machine to a client in Germany in 1941.

== Design considerations ==
A normal (rigid) locomotive would cause considerable wear on the line. A Garratt type locomotive, flexible by its articulated design, offered several further advantages: accommodation for a short and wide boiler, low center of gravity, and better accessibility for maintenance.

== Technology ==
In exception to the general type, this Garratt locomotive had internal cylinders, and is more in line with other tramway locomotives in The Netherlands. The water storage was located on the bogies. The water tanks were located below the running boards, to ensure pressure was applied to all axles even when running empty. Additionally, this allowed for unobstructed views from the cabin. The valve gear was of the Verhoop system. The two traction bogies, which were in fact locomotives without a boiler and cabin, shared - apart from one extra axle - their basic design and layout with B locomotives LTM 21-35. Pistons, valves and rods were identical.

Coal storage was located at the rear of the cabin in two coal storage bins. In between these storage bins there were a door and a passage way that allowed easy access to the pivot point.

== Brakes ==
The locomotive had four types of brakes: an automatic Knorr air pressure brake system (for use with railroad equipment), a Hardy vacuum brake (used in combination with the Knorr system when pulling LTM equipment), a direct working air pressure switching brake controlled from two control points on both sides of the cabin, a hand brake to be operated together with a steam brake in case of emergencies.

== Reversing Gear ==
A servo motor controlled the steam valves instead of the more common manual reversing gear. On the piston rod of a steam cylinder (the actual motor) a glycerine buffer was installed which was used to hold the reach rod in position. This buffer consisted of a second piston working in a liquid filled cylinder the halves of which could be connected through a bypass valve. In order to change direction and set cut-off, dipping the reversing lever (either forward or backward as required) would momentarily permit steam to the servo motor and at the same time open the bypass valve. On centering the lever the position reached would be arrested. An indicator hand was coupled to the reach rod showing the current setting to the driver.

== Trivia ==
Number 51 had previously been assigned to a small stock locomotive which was sold after the line had been completed.
