= Piston valve (steam engine) =

Form of valve within a steam engine or locomotive

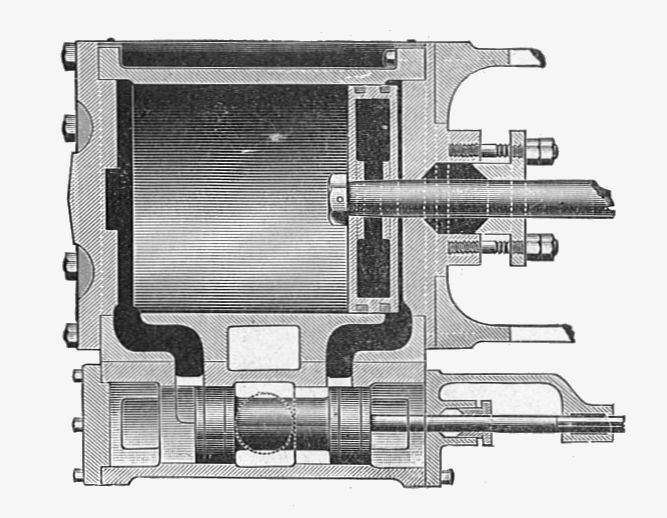
Diagram of cylinder and piston valve. The valve is next opened by moving it to the right, allowing the clear space in the middle of the valve to align with the channel in the cylinder above it.

Piston valves are one form of valve used to control the flow of steam within a steam engine or locomotive. They control the admission of steam into the cylinders and its subsequent exhausting, enabling a locomotive to move under its own power. The valve consists of two piston heads on a common spindle moving inside a steam chest, which is essentially a mini-cylinder located either above or below the main cylinders of the locomotive.

== Overview ==
In the 19th century, steam locomotives used slide valves to control the flow of steam into and out of the cylinders. In the 20th century, slide valves were gradually superseded by piston valves, particularly in engines using superheated steam. There were two reasons for this:

- It is difficult to lubricate slide valves adequately in the presence of superheated steam
- With piston valves, the steam passages can be made shorter. This, particularly following the work of André Chapelon, reduces resistance to the flow of steam and improves efficiency

The usual locomotive valve gears such as Stephenson, Walschaerts, and Baker valve gear, can be used with either slide valves or piston valves. Where poppet valves are used, a different gear, such as Caprotti valve gear may be used, though standard gears as mentioned above were used as well, by Chapelon and others.

Most piston valves are of the "inside admission" type, where fresh steam is introduced from the boiler via the space between the two piston heads of the valve, and exhaust steam leaves via the space between a piston head and the end of the steam chest. The advantage of this arrangement is that leakage, via the gland which seals the steam chest from the operating rod of the valve gear, is much less of a problem when the gland is subjected to low exhaust pressure rather than full boiler pressure. However, some locomotives, like Bulleid's SR Merchant Navy class, used "outside admission" where the reverse was true, in Bulleid's case because of the unusual chain-driven valve gear arrangement.

== Examples ==
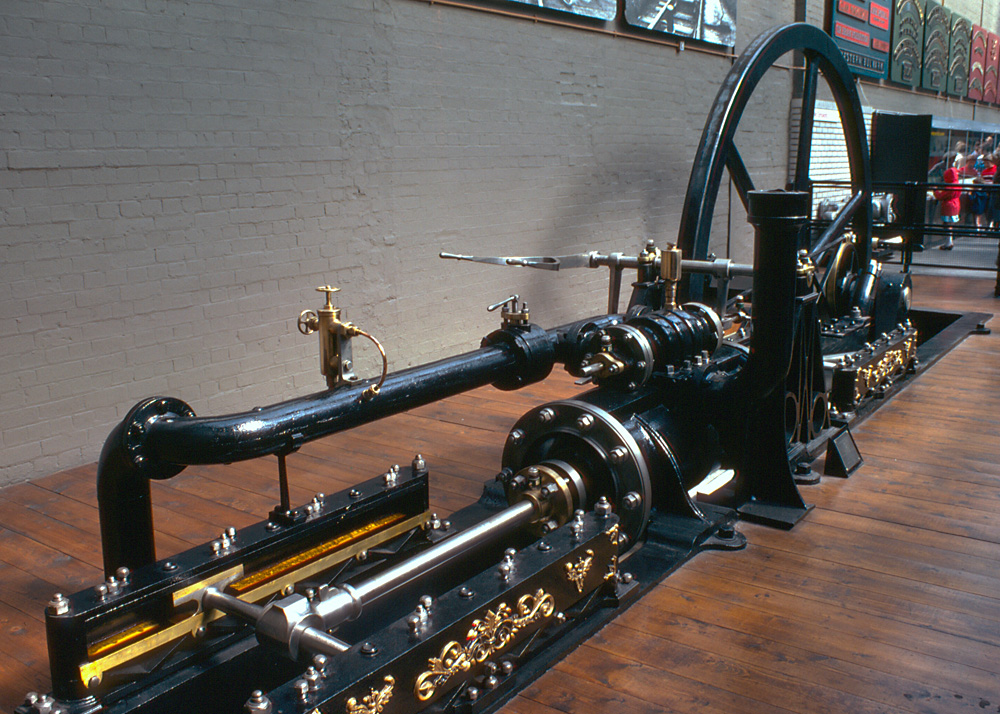
The Swannington incline winding engine of 1833 incorporated a piston valve

The Swannington incline winding engine on the Leicester and Swannington Railway, manufactured by The Horsely Coal & Iron Company in 1833, shows a very early use of the piston valve. Piston valves had been used a year or two previously in the horizontal engines manufactured by Taylor & Martineau of London, but did not become general for stationary or locomotive engines until the end of the 19th century.

== Design principles ==
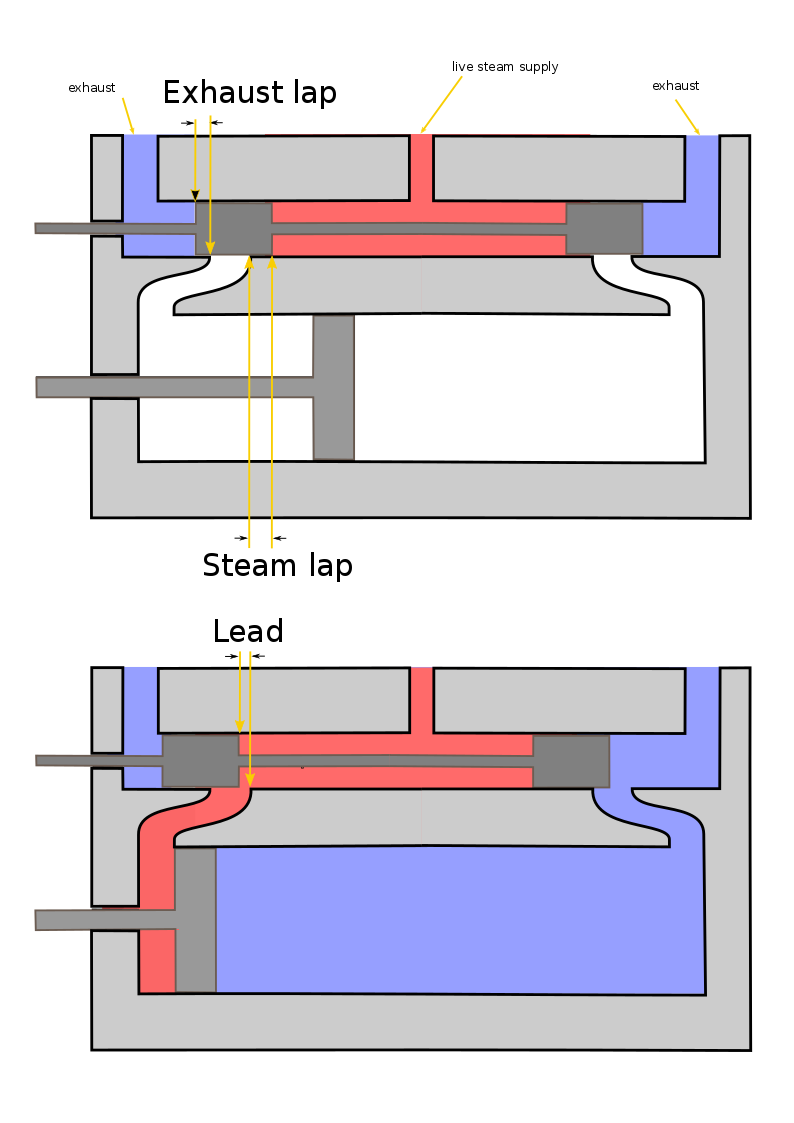
Diagram showing lap and lead and their relation to valve travel

When on the move, a steam locomotive requires steam to enter the cylinder at precise times relative to the piston's position. This entails controlling the admission and exhaust of steam to and from the cylinders with a valve linked to the motion of the piston.

For timing and dimensioning of slide or piston valves where the valve opens and closes the steam and exhaust ports, a consideration of the "lap" and "lead" is required.

=== Lap ===
Lap is the amount by which the valve overlaps each port at the middle position of each valve. There are two different types of lap.

The first kind is the steam lap, which is the amount by which the valve overlaps the steam port on the live steam side of the piston or slide valve (i.e. the distance the valve needs to move to just begin to uncover the port).

Secondly, the exhaust lap, which is the amount by which the valve overlaps the exhaust port on the exhaust side of the piston or slide valve. Exhaust lap is generally given to slow-running locomotives. This is because it allows the steam to remain in the cylinder for the longest possible amount of time before being expended as exhaust, therefore increasing efficiency. shunter locomotives tended to be equipped with this addition.

Negative exhaust lap, also commonly known as exhaust clearance, is the amount the port is open to exhaust when the valve is in mid-position, and is used on many fast-running locomotives to give a free exhaust. The cylinder on both sides of the piston is open to exhaust at the same time when the valve is passing through the mid-position, which is only momentary when running.

=== Lead ===
Lead is the amount by which a port is open when the piston is at front or back "dead centre". In the case of the steam port this allows admission of steam to fill the clearance space between the cylinder and piston and ensures maximum cylinder pressure before the commencement of the stroke. This both cushions and assists the mass of the piston to slow down and change direction. At slow speeds no lead is ideal. For engines with pistons of 24 inches plus and masses of over 5 kilos and pressures under 500 psi then cushioning is beneficial. Lead is necessary on locomotives designed for high speeds.

=== Calculating valve events ===
Given the valve's lap, lead, and travel, at what point in the piston's stroke does the valve open and close, to steam and to exhaust?

Calculating an exact answer to that question before computers was too much work. The easy approximation (used in Zeuner's and Realeaux's diagrams) is to pretend that both the valve and the piston have a sine-wave motion (as they would, if the main rod were infinitely long). Then, for instance, to calculate the percent of the piston's stroke at which steam admission is cut off:

- Calculate the angle whose cosine is twice the lap divided by the valve travel
- Calculate the angle whose cosine is twice the (lap plus lead), divided by the valve travel

Add the two angles and take the cosine of their sum; subtract 1 from that cosine and multiply the result by -50.

As built the Pennsylvania's I1s 2-10-0 had lap 2 inches, lead 1/4 inch and valve travel 6 inches in full gear. In full gear the two angles are 48.19 deg and 41.41 deg and the maximum cutoff comes out 49.65% of the piston stroke.

== See also ==
- Slide valve
- Steam locomotive components
- Valve gear
