= Maine Central class K 0-6-0 =

Maine Central class K
Type and origin
- Power type: Steam
- Builder: ALCO
- Build date: 1909–1920
- Total produced: 20
Specifications
- Configuration
  - Whyte: 0-6-0
  - UIC: C
- Gauge: 4 ft 8 1/2 in (1,435 mm)
- Driver dia.: 51 in (1,295 mm)
- Wheelbase: 11 ft 0 in (3.35 m)
- Length: 58 ft 0 in (17.68 m) including tender
- Height: 14 ft 5 1/2 in (4.41 m)
- Loco weight: 165,300 lb (75.0 tonnes)
- Total weight: 280,000 lb (127.0 tonnes)
- Fuel type: Coal
- Fuel capacity: 7 t
- Water cap.: 4,000 US gal (15 m^{3})
- Cylinders: Two
- Cylinder size: 20 in × 26 in (508 mm × 660 mm)
Performance figures
- Tractive effort: 37,000 lbf (164.6 kN)
Career
- Retired: 1953

Maine Central Railroad steam switchers were designated Class K. They were of 0-6-0 wheel arrangement in the Whyte notation, or "C" in UIC classification. American Locomotive Company (ALCO) began building more powerful yard locomotives for Maine Central in 1909. Twenty locomotives numbered 161 through 180 were active in 1923, and worked in Maine's largest cities until replaced by diesels after World War II.

== Initial production ==
Sub-class K-5 was 28,000 lb (12.7 tonnes) lighter with 5,800 lbf (25.8 kN) less tractive effort than the infobox figures. ALCO's Schenectady, New York plant delivered builders numbers 46398 and 46399 in 1909, 49201 and 49202 in 1910, and 50844 and 50845 in 1912. Two more were briefly numbered for Maine Central before being transferred to the newly formed Portland Terminal Company, but the remaining six were numbered 161 through 166 in the order built.

Earlier K class 0-6-0s were rebuilt with higher-pressure boilers in Maine Central's Waterville shop between 1913 and 1916 as sub-classes K-6 and K-7. These reboilered locomotives weighing 90,000 lb (40.8 tonnes) with tractive effort of 20,000 lbf (89.0 kN) were numbered 153 through 160. Most were scrapped during the Great Depression and none survived World War II.

== Preferred design ==
Infobox figures describe sub-class K-8. ALCO's Schenectady plant delivered builders numbers 55553, 55554, 56500 and 56501 in 1916. World War I caused 1918 production to be split between builders numbers 57883 and 57884 from Schenectady, and 59865 and 59866 from ALCO's Pittsburgh plant. The United States Railroad Administration (USRA) directed ALCO's Paterson plant to complete builders numbers 61373 and 61374 as standard USRA 0-6-0s in 1919. These two had 2,100 lbf (9.3 kN) greater tractive effort, and became Maine Central sub-class K-9 numbered 175 and 176. After the war ended, Schenectady assembled builders numbers 62047 through 62050 to the K-8 specifications in 1920. These were the last steam switchers built for Maine Central; but an 0-6-0 built for the S. D. Warren Paper Mill in 1924 was purchased in 1928 and numbered 189; and an 0-8-0 built for the Boston and Maine Railroad in 1922 became Maine Central number 199 to handle increased traffic during World War II.

== Replacement ==
ALCO HH660s numbered 951 and 952 worked alongside the class K locomotives through World War II; but ALCO S-1s numbered 953 through 960 rapidly retired steam locomotives through the late 1940s, and ALCO S-3s 961 and 962 replaced the last survivors in 1953.
