= Pennsylvania Railroad class N1s =

Pennsylvania Railroad N1s
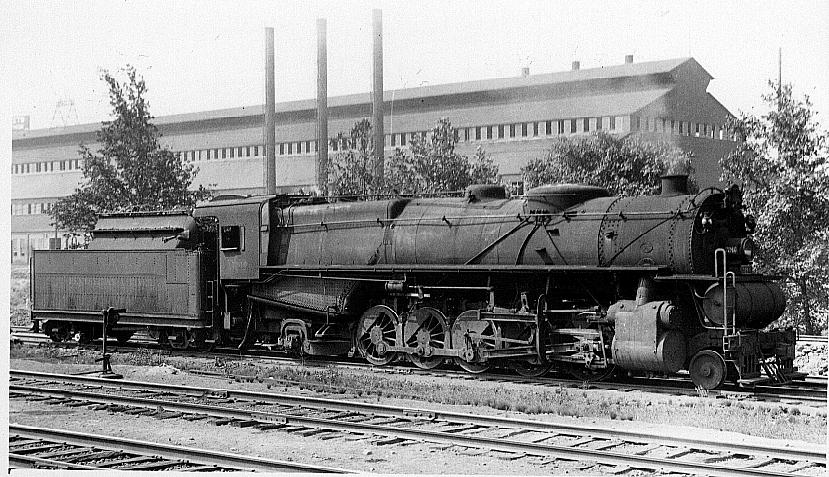
- PRR N1s #7246 at Youngstown, Ohio in 1919, when less than a year old. Note the Lines West central headlight (later relocated higher) and high slope-sided tender coal space
Type and origin
- Power type: Steam
- Builder: ALCO-Brooks (35), Baldwin Locomotive Works (25)
- Build date: 1918–1919
- Total produced: 60
Specifications
- Configuration
  - Whyte: 2-10-2
  - UIC: 1'E1'h2g
- Gauge: 4 ft 8 1/2 in (1,435 mm)
- Leading dia.: 33 in (0.838 m)
- Driver dia.: 62 in (1.575 m)
- Trailing dia.: 36 in (0.914 m)
- Minimum curve: 22 Degrees
- Wheelbase: Locomotive: 41 ft 11 1/2 in (12.789 m)
  - Drivers: 22.17 ft (6.757 m)
- Length: 91 ft 4 5/8 in (27.85 m)
- Axle load: 75,600 lb (34,300 kg; 34.3 t)
- Adhesive weight: 351,000 lb (159,000 kg; 159 t)
- Loco weight: 435,000 lb (197,000 kg; 197 t)
- Tender weight: Empty: 86,800 lb (39,400 kg; 39.4 t); Loaded: 206,100 lb (93,500 kg; 93.5 t)
- Tender type: 100 F 85
- Fuel type: Coal
- Fuel capacity: 39,300 lb (17,800 kg; 17.8 t)
- Water cap.: 9,600 US gal (36,000 L; 8,000 imp gal)
- Firebox
  - Type: Belpaire
  - Grate area: 79.9 sq ft (7.4 m^{2})
- Boiler pressure: 215 psi (1.48 MPa)
- Cylinders: Two
- Cylinder size: 30 in × 32 in (762 mm × 813 mm)
- Valve gear: Walschaerts
- Valve type: Piston
- Valve travel: 8.5 in (216 mm)
Performance figures
- Maximum speed: 35 mph (56 km/h)
- Tractive effort: 84,890 lbf (377.61 kN)
- Factor of adh.: 4.13
Career
- Locale: Midwest (Illinois Indiana, Ohio)
- Retired: by 1950
- Disposition: All scrapped

The Pennsylvania Railroad (PRR) N1s was a class of 2-10-2 "Santa Fe" steam locomotives built for the Pennsylvania's Lines West. 60 engines were built between December 1918 and November 1919, and worked heavy mineral freight to and from ports on the Great Lakes until their retirement in the late 1940s. All examples were scrapped by 1950.

== Overview ==
The 2-10-2 wheel arrangement, ten driving wheels with a two-wheel leading truck and a two-wheel cast KW-pattern trailing truck under a large Belpaire firebox, suited the N1s' intended purpose well. They were drag freight engines, designed to haul heavy freight up the 0.3% grade leading out of the PRR's "Lake ports," and were rated at 6,000 short tons (5,400 t) on these relatively easy grades. The design was developed by the PRR's Fort Wayne Shops and orders were placed with Alco (Brooks) (35 locomotives) and Baldwin (25 locomotives) for a total of 60; the first Alco locomotive was delivered in December 1918, with the remainder arriving during 1919.

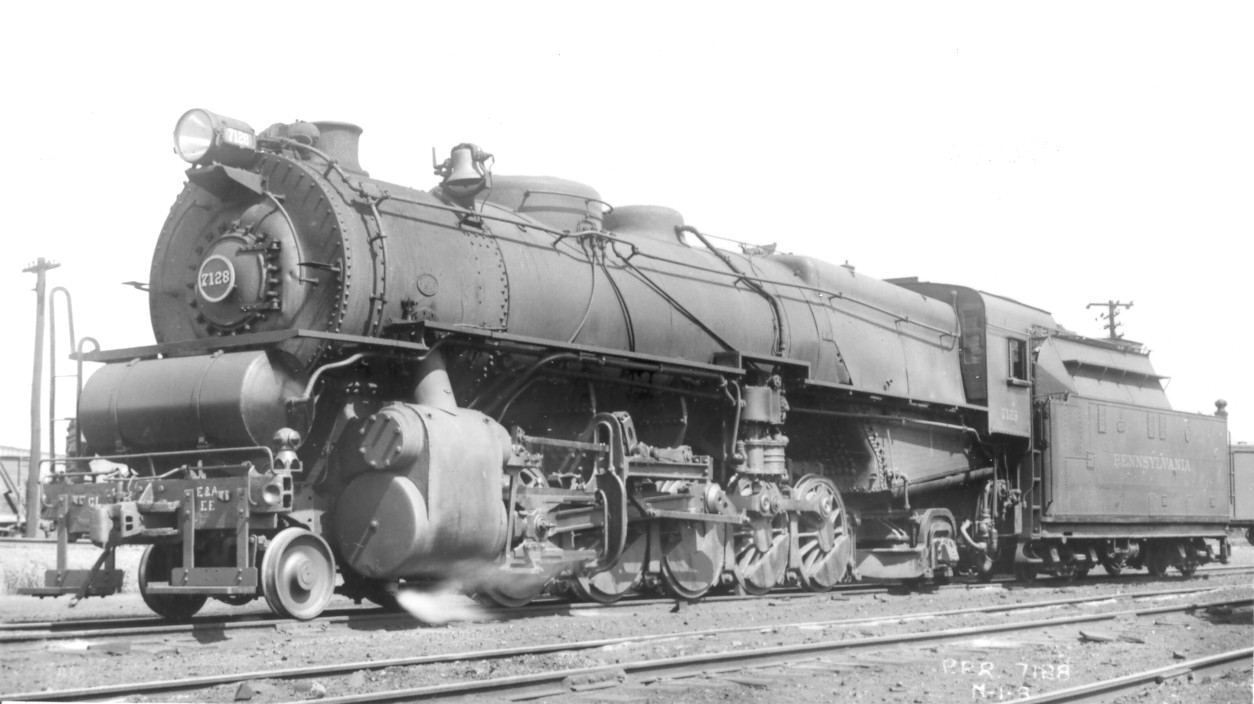
Pennsylvania Railroad N1s #7128 in Erie, PA in 1948. Note the repositioned headlight compared to the original 'Lines West' configuration.

The N1s was a large locomotive; the boiler was the largest then used on any non-experimental PRR locomotive, and the firebox had 79.9 square feet (7.4 m^{2}) of grate area and a 5-foot (1.52 m) long combustion chamber. No feedwater heater was fitted, but a mechanical stoker and power reverse were installed, being necessities on such a large locomotive. Boiler pressure was initially set at 205 pounds per square inch (1.41 MPa), but was quickly raised to 215 pounds per square inch (1.48 MPa). The boiler was reportedly designed to take a pressure of 250 psi (1.72 MPa), but whether it attained this pressure in service is not known.

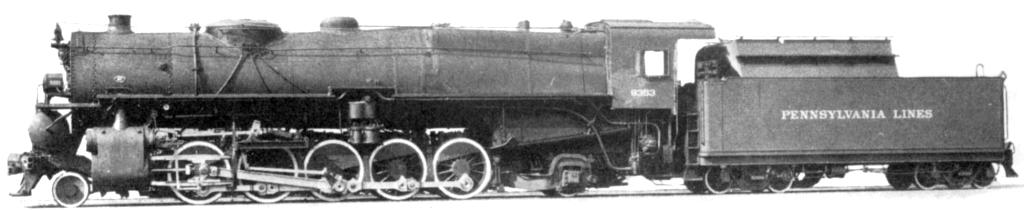
PRR N1s #8363 in its official builders' photo.

To allow the locomotive to negotiate tight 22-degree curves, the first and fifth driving axles were fitted with lateral motion devices and the center axle was blind.

== Comparison ==
In many respects, the N1s was similar to the I1s 2-10-0 "Decapod". Driver diameter was identical, and the cylinders on the I1s were a mere 0.5 in (13 mm) wider, having the same stroke of 32 in (810 mm). The N1s had a longer boiler at 20.83 ft (6,350 mm) long, but the I1s used a higher working pressure of 250 psi (1.7 MPa). The I1s' tractive effort was higher, at just over 96,026 lbf (427.14 kN), versus the N1s' at 84,890 lbf (377.6 kN), while maintaining nearly identical weight on drivers (adhesive weight). The N1s, as a low speed drag hauler, was limited to 35 mph (56 km/h), while the I1s was capable of up to 50 mph (80 km/h).

== Disposition ==
The N1s were the first class of large power withdrawn after diesel locomotives appeared, as diesels proved superior at the low-speed "lugging" the N1s was designed for. All were scrapped by 1950.

== See also ==
- Pennsylvania Railroad I1 class
- Pennsylvania Railroad class J1
- 2-10-2
