= Canadian National class O-19 0-6-0 =

Canadian National class O-19
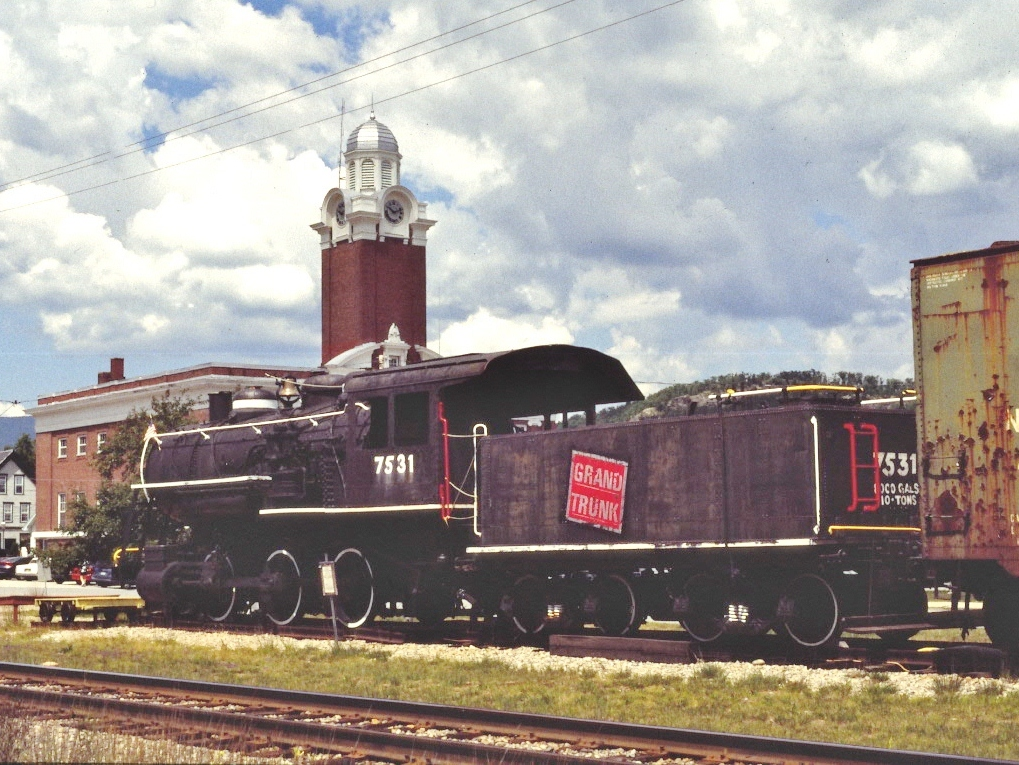
- this is actually (New England Gas and Coke Company no.4) repainted too look like No.7531
Type and origin
- Power type: Steam
- Build date: 1919-1929
- Total produced: 12
Specifications
- Configuration
  - Whyte: 0-6-0
  - UIC: C
- Gauge: 4 ft 8 1/2 in (1,435 mm)
- Driver dia.: 51 in (1,295 mm)
- Boiler pressure: 190 lbf/in^{2} (13 kg/cm^{2})
- Cylinders: Two
- Cylinder size: 21 in × 28 in (533 mm × 711 mm)
Performance figures
- Tractive effort: 39,000 lbf (173.5 kN)
Career
- Retired: 1961
- Disposition: All Scrapped

Canadian National Railway (CN) Class O-19 steam locomotives were of 0-6-0 wheel arrangement in the Whyte notation, or " C " in UIC classification. These USRA 0-6-0 locomotives were built for the Grand Trunk Railway (GT) in 1919 and remained in yard service until the final replacement of steam with diesel locomotives. ALCO builders numbers 60187 through 60191 were built at the Cooke plant as Grand Trunk Western Railroad numbers 1744 through 1748 while builders numbers 61298 through 61302 were built at the Schenectady, New York plant numbered 1824 through 1828 for use on New England lines. The locomotives were renumbered from 7522 through 7531 under Canadian National control, but retained Grand Trunk lettering for service in the United States.

Montreal Locomotive Works builders number 67624 was delivered in 1928 as number 202 for the National Harbours Board Railway in Vancouver. Builders number 68225 was delivered in 1929 as number 204. These locomotives were added to class O-19 in 1953 when they were renumbered CN 7542 and 7543.
