= Reverser handle =

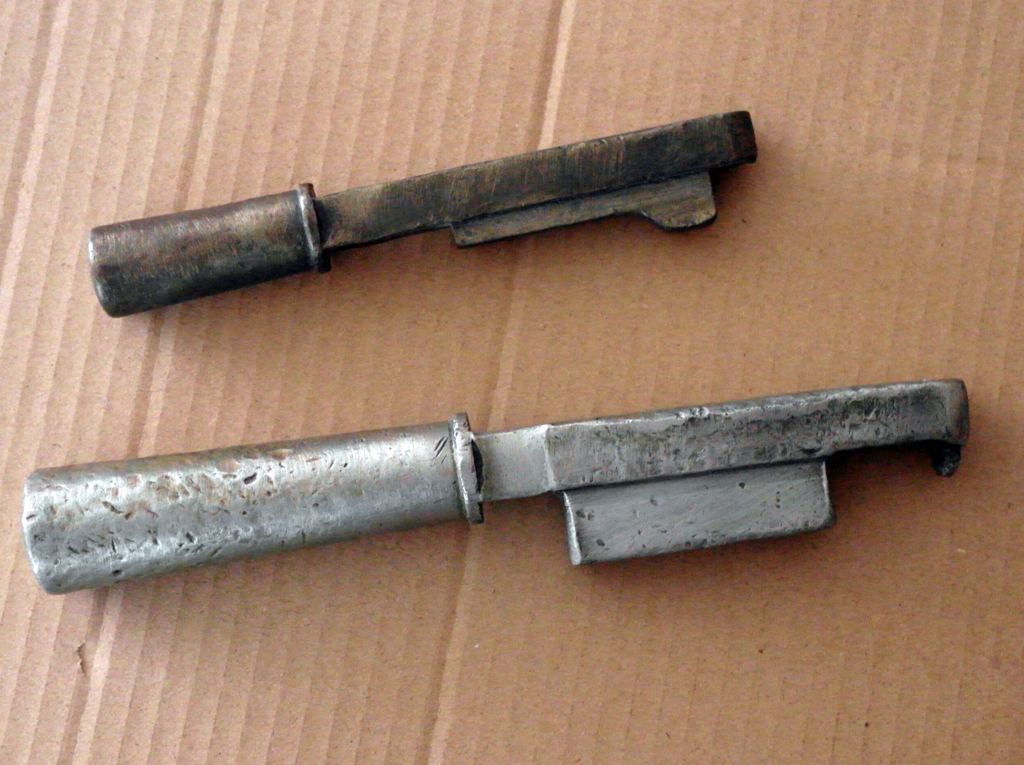
Pair of reverser handles for use on diesel-electric locomotives

A reverser handle is an operating control for a railroad locomotive that is used to determine the direction of travel. The reverser usually has three positions: forward, reverse, and neutral.

== Operation ==
When the reverser is in the forward or reverse position, the locomotive will move in the indicated direction when the throttle is opened. Removing the reverser handle from the control stand in the neutral position locks the throttle controller, effectively disabling the locomotive. The reverser lever is sometimes referred to as a "railroad key."

== History ==
A reversing mechanism of some type has been present on locomotives almost since inception. The reversing lever on a steam locomotive is sometimes called a Johnson Bar. The style of reverser used on internal combustion locomotives has been in use since at least the early 1900s but as late as 1996 patented improvements have been made to the design and operation.

== See also ==
- Rail terminology
- Reversing gear
- Cutoff (steam engine)
