= Doodlebug disaster =

Railway accident in 1940

Details
- Date: July 31, 1940; 5:58 p.m.
- Location: Cuyahoga Falls, Ohio
- Coordinates: 41°08′43″N 81°28′24″W
- Country: United States
- Operator: Pennsylvania Railroad
- Incident type: Head-on collision
- Cause: Failure to obey orders possibly due to carbon monoxide poisoning

Statistics
- Trains: 2
- Passengers: 46
- Deaths: 43
- Injured: 5 (includes 2 bystanders)

The Doodlebug disaster was a railway accident that occurred on July 31, 1940, in Cuyahoga Falls, Ohio, in the United States. A Pennsylvania Railroad, gasoline-powered "doodlebug" passenger rail car collided head-on with a freight train; the impact and resulting fire caused the deaths of all but three of the 46 onboard.

== Trains ==
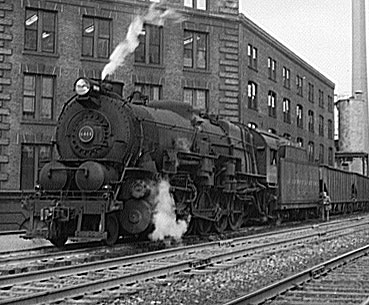
A Pennsylvania Railroad I1 similar to the freight train involved in the accident

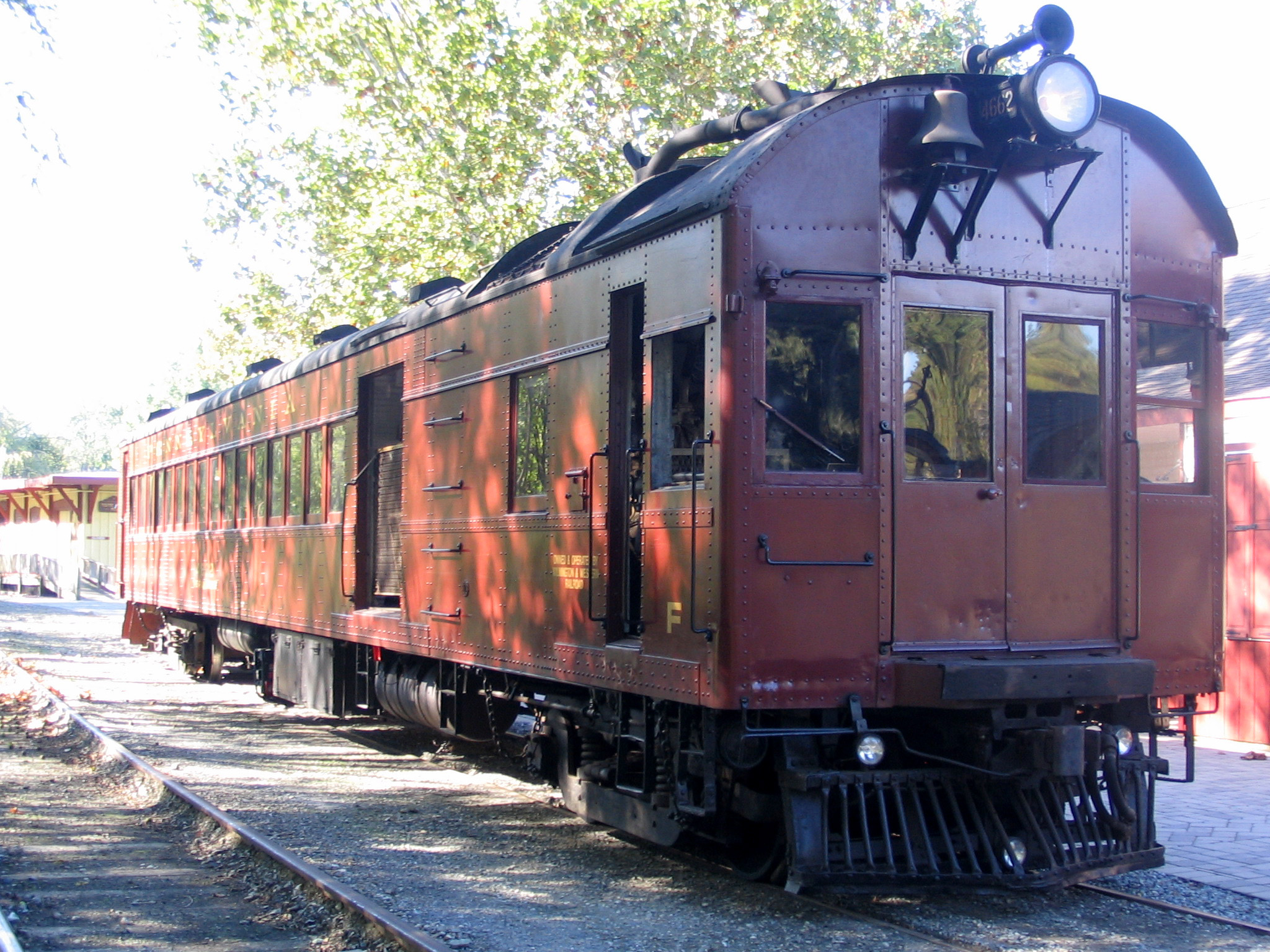
A Wilmington and Western Doodlebug railcar similar to the one involved

The "doodlebug" concerned, No. 4648, a PRR class GEW275, was a self-propelled, gas-electric rail car that used gasoline to generate electricity to power its traction motors; it was one of six built in 1928 by Pullman/Electro-Motive. It had departed Hudson at 5:49 pm on its usual 13-mile (21 km) run south to Akron on a warm summer evening with 46 people aboard. At the same time, a freight train composed of two Pennsylvania Railroad I1SA 2-10-0 locomotives, 73 freight cars and a caboose traveling from Columbus to Cleveland departed Arlington in Akron heading north.

== Collision ==
Within 10 minutes, both had met with disaster; the doodlebug should have pulled into a siding at Silver Lake to allow the freight to pass through the single-track railway section at that point, but instead, it continued southward. Although both trains braked, their combined speed was 55 mph (89 km/h) when they collided at 5:58 pm. The engineer, conductor, and a railroad employee managed to jump free, though they were badly injured; no one else on the doodlebug survived. As the lead freight engine telescoped 12 feet (3.7 m) into the railcar, the doodlebug's 350-US-gallon (1,300 L; 290 imp gal) gasoline tank ruptured and sprayed the interior of the coach with burning fuel, as the doodlebug was pushed over 500 feet (150 m) up the track by the momentum of the heavy freight train (which remained on the track); "flames shooting out 25 feet" [7.6 m] in all directions. The medical examiner determined that only nine passengers were killed on impact, the rest were burned to death. Firemen fought the blaze for 45 minutes, but several hours were needed before the bodies could be removed; most required saws to separate them from the seats to which they had been fused by the flames. Ambulances soon gathered at the scene, but only the three railroad employees needed to be taken to a hospital; instead, they took the charred bodies to funeral homes.

== Investigation ==
The doodlebug engineman survived and was able to recall receiving orders at Hudson to take the siding at Silver Lake, but he was unable to recall passing the siding. The investigation considered the possibility that the engineer could have been "under the influence of carbon monoxide poisoning with a resultant temporary impairment of mental faculties, but not be wholly unconscious", which would explain his behavior. The driver had complained of fumes in the cabs on previous occasions. No charges were held against him.

== Memorial ==
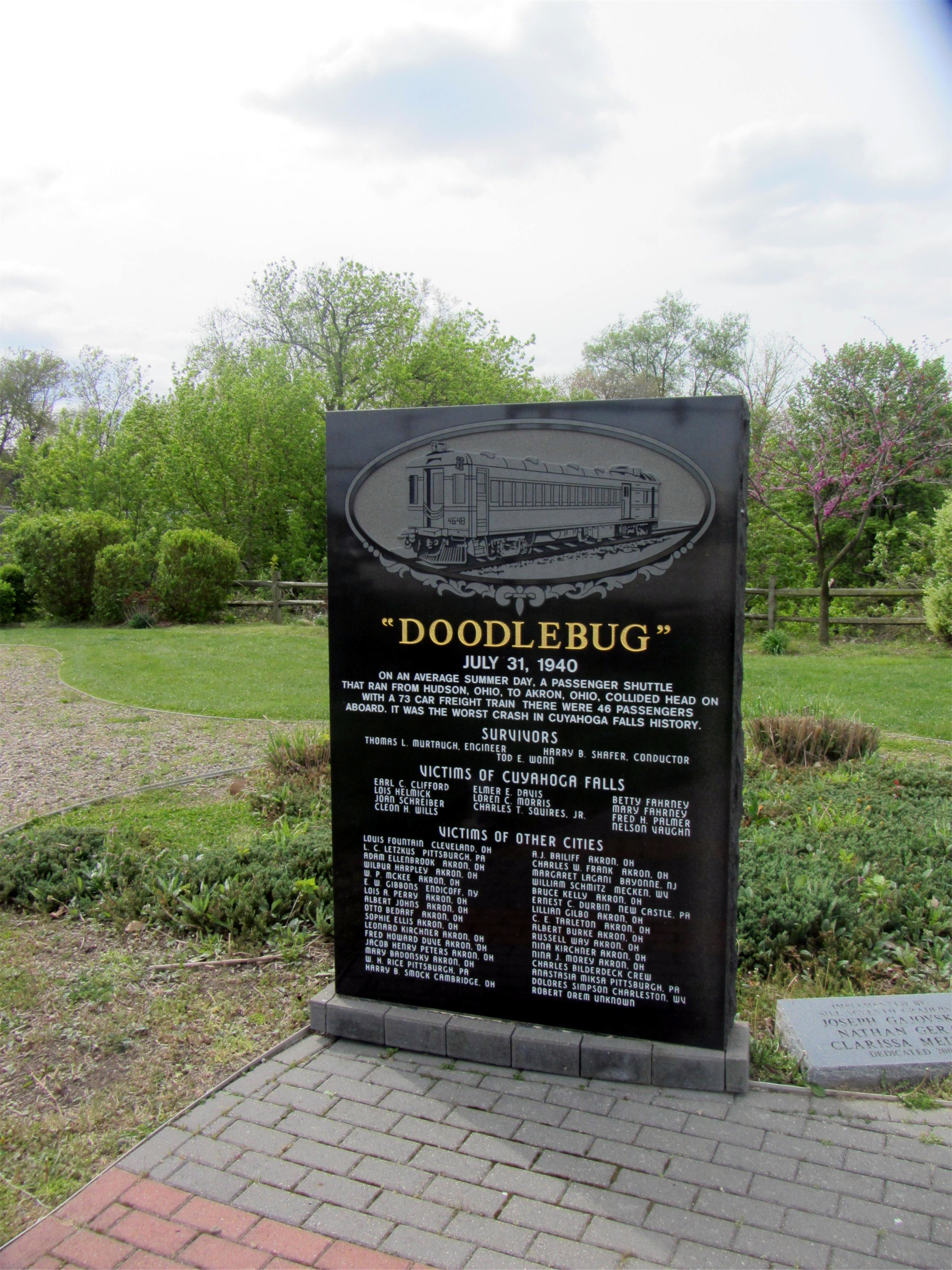
Doodlebug Memorial

In 2005, a memorial monument was built near the site of the disaster on its 65th anniversary. The memorial was the result of a school project by three 13-year-olds at Sill Middle School, which led a fundraising campaign to establish a permanent memorial to those killed in the disaster.
