= USRA standard =

Locomotive designs

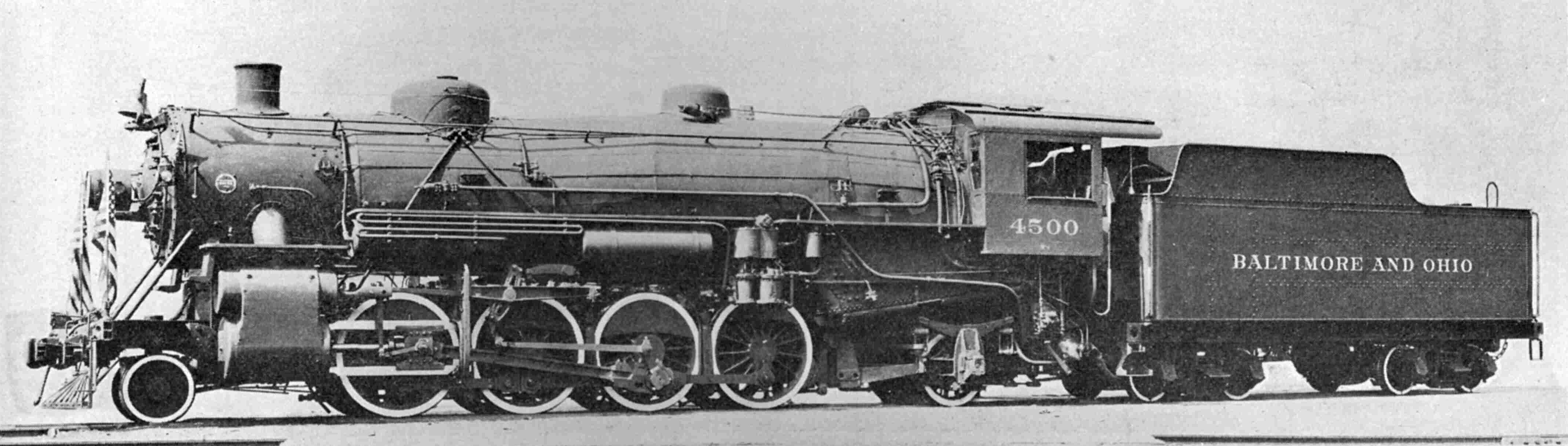
The Light Mikado was the standard light freight locomotive and the most widely built type of the USRA standard designs.

The USRA standard locomotives and railroad cars were designed by the United States Railroad Administration, the nationalized rail system of the United States during World War I. 1,870 steam locomotives and over 100,000 railroad cars were built to these designs during the USRA's tenure. The locomotive designs in particular were the nearest the American railroads and locomotive builders ever got to standard locomotive types, and after the USRA was dissolved in 1920 many of the designs were duplicated in number, 3,251 copies being constructed overall. The last steam locomotive built for a Class I railroad in the United States, an 0-8-0 built by the Norfolk and Western Railway in 1953, was a USRA design. A total of 97 railroads used USRA or USRA-derived locomotives.

== Steam locomotive types ==
The USRA developed designs for 0-6-0 and 0-8-0 switcher locomotives, 2-6-6-2 and 2-8-8-2 Mallet locomotives, and both light and heavy versions of the 2-8-2, 2-10-2, 4-6-2, and 4-8-2 types. The light versions were designed with an axle load of 54,000 lb (24,500 kg) permitting usage on the vast majority of railroads, while the heavy versions were designed to a maximum axle load of 60,000 lb (27,200 kg) for lines with more heavily constructed track.

The U.S.R.A. also distributed 2-10-0 Decapods of Russian design to railroads under its control.

=== USRA 0-6-0 ===
255 USRA 0-6-0 locomotives were built, as well as many copies.

=== USRA 0-8-0 ===
175 USRA 0-8-0 locomotives were built, and it was copied extensively thereafter.

=== USRA Light 2-8-2 "Mikado" ===
614 USRA Light Mikados were built, making it the most populous USRA type.

=== USRA Heavy 2-8-2 "Mikado" ===
233 USRA Heavy Mikados were built.

=== USRA Light 2-10-2 "Santa Fe" ===
94 USRA Light Santa Fes were built.

=== USRA Heavy 2-10-2 "Santa Fe" ===
175 USRA Heavy Santa Fes were built.

=== USRA Light 4-6-2 "Pacific" ===
106 USRA Light Pacifics were built.

=== USRA Heavy 4-6-2 "Pacific" ===
20 USRA Heavy Pacifics were built.

=== USRA Light 4-8-2 "Mountain" ===
47 USRA Light Mountains were built.

=== USRA Heavy 4-8-2 "Mountain" ===
15 USRA Heavy Mountains were built.

=== USRA 2-6-6-2 ===
30 USRA 2-6-6-2 locomotives were built.

=== 2-8-8-2 ===
106 USRA 2-8-8-2 locomotives were built. The Norfolk and Western Railway, in particular, continued building this type after the USRA period, developing and modernising it over time, as its Class Y. A N&W Y6B was the last conventional freight-hauling steam locomotive built in the United States.

== Freight cars ==
As part of the USRA, two common boxcar designs were developed: a single sheathed car and a double sheathed car. When the USRA boxcars were being designed there wasn't an industry consensus on which was better, so both were built. Freight car design was still in flux in the early part of the 20th century. As John White points out in The American Freight Car, most cars were really composites, not completely wood or steel, and even after steel cars had become the norm, wood had its uses and advantages. Still, steel underframes had come to replace wood underframes, but as metallurgy improved, there were new designs developed that took advantage of the improved technology. USRA double sheathed boxcars had a fishbelly underframe while the USRA single sheathed cars did not. In general, double sheathed boxcars are like girder bridges, so all the support needs to come from the frame. Those cars need a stronger frame, hence the fishbelly underframe. Single sheathed cars are like truss bridges, with the metal side bracing acting as the main structural support for the "bridge." While some engineers did not trust the steel bracing to support a single sheathed car and ordered fishbelly frames for strength, others valued the savings in weight and ordered cars with simpler frames like the USRA SS design.

Type of cars built by the USRA
Type	USRA Specification	Number of cars produced
50-ton Single-Sheathed Box Car	1001-B	25,000
50-ton Drop-Bottom Gondola	1002-B	20,000
40-ton Double-Sheathed Box Car	1003-B	25,000
55-ton Steel Twin Hopper	1005-B	5,000
70-ton Steel Drop-End Mill Gondola	1006-B	5,000
