= LTM 51-52 =

Limburgsche Tramweg Maatschappij (LTM) 51-52 were a series of locomotives built for the LTM by Linke-Hofmann, serial numbers 2542 and 2547, in 1922. These stock locomotives, which entered service in 1922, were of the standard Henkel-type. These locomotives were engaged in the construction of the standard gauge tramways of the Limburgsche Tramweg Maatschappij (LTM). LTM 51 was sold to the Staatsmijnen (SM) in 1923. It was renumbered 27 and used for switching. It remained in service until 1957 when it was sold for scrap to Van den Burg en Levison (Zutphen). LTM 52 was used to run coal trains between Echt NS and Maasbracht Haven (harbour) for the LTM, after construction works were completed until the service was terminated in 1936. It was sold to Dotremont (Maastricht, The Netherlands) in 1937.
