= Southern valve gear =

Steam locomotive propulsion system

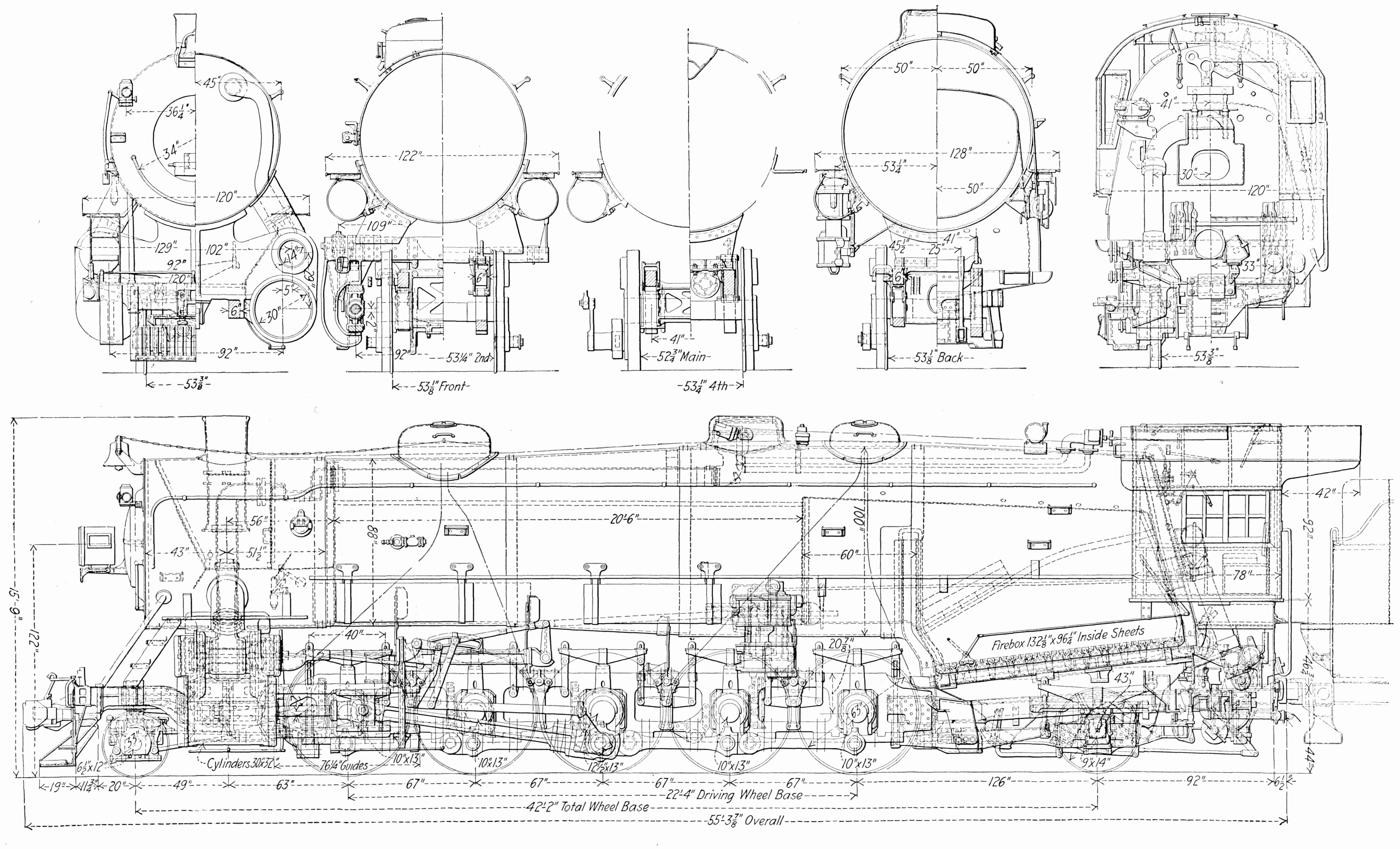
USRA Heavy Santa Fe diagram showing Southern valve gear

Southern valve gear was briefly popular on steam locomotives in the United States. It combines elements of the Walschaerts and Baker patterns.

== History ==
Southern valve gear was devised by locomotive designers on the Southern Railway and used on many locomotives on that line. The first patent was issued to Wm. Sherman Brown in 1906. He continued work and another patent, U.S. Patent No. 1,033,532, was issued July 23, 1912. The gear was first tested on Mikado 586 in February, 1913 at Southern Knoxville Shops. It was specified for some USRA standard locomotive designs, though many locomotives constructed to these patterns used Walschaerts or Baker valve gear instead. The Southern valve gear was used on many Southern Railway locomotives, including survivors 630 and 722. It was also used on East Broad Top numbers 16-18, which survive today. 16 was restored to operational condition in 2023.

== Operation ==
Unlike the Walschaerts and Baker systems, the Southern valve gear dispensed with the combination lever which transmitted some of the crosshead motion to the valves. As with those systems it used a return crank on a driver (instead of the eccentrics used by the Stephenson valve gear). The return crank attached to the eccentric rod, which hung from a pivot close to the far end of the eccentric rod. This pivot attached to the end of the radius hanger, the other end of which attached to a link block which slid back and forth in a track curved in the same manner as the expansion link of a Walschaerts gear. In this system, however, the track was fixed in place; sliding the link block back and forth controlled reversing and cutoff.

At the end of the eccentric rod, close to the radius hanger, the rod connected to the transmission yoke. The upper end of this rod connected to a bellcrank, which translated the up and down motion of the transmission yoke into back and forth motion of the valves.

The mechanism is a little less obvious than that of the other types, but control is fundamentally like that of the Baker system. In this case the controlling factor is the angle between the radius hanger and the transmission yoke; when they are parallel, there is little up-down motion of the transmission yoke and the engine is centered. As link block moves back and forth, the angle of the radius hanger changes, and the up and down motion of the transmission yoke in response to the back and forth motion of the eccentric rod is increased or decreased.
