= Pennsylvania Railroad I1 class =

Class of 598 American 2-10-0 locomotives

Pennsylvania Railroad I1s
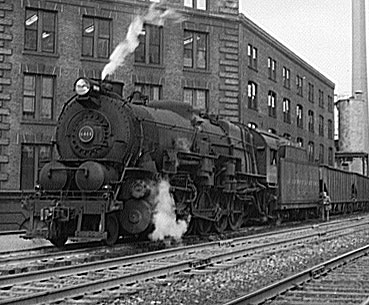
- PRR I1s prepares to leave the docks at Cleveland, Ohio with a trainload of iron ore in May, 1943.
Type and origin
- Power type: Steam
- Builder: Pennsylvania Railroad's Altoona Shops (123); Baldwin Locomotive Works (475)
- Build date: 1916–1923
- Total produced: 598
Specifications
- Configuration
  - Whyte: 2-10-0
- Gauge: 4 ft 8 1/2 in (1,435 mm)
- Leading dia.: 33 in (838 mm)
- Driver dia.: 62 in (1,575 mm)
- Height: 15 ft (4.57 m)
- Axle load: 72,600 lb (32,900 kilograms; 32.9 metric tons)
- Adhesive weight: 352,500 lb (159,900 kilograms; 159.9 metric tons)
- Loco weight: 386,100 lb (175,100 kilograms; 175.1 metric tons)
- Tender weight: 204,700 lb (92,900 kilograms; 92.9 metric tons)
- Total weight: 590,800 lb (268,000 kilograms; 268.0 metric tons)
- Fuel capacity: 18.7 t (18.4 long tons; 20.6 short tons)
- Water cap.: 10,300 US gal (39,000 L; 8,600 imp gal)
- Fuel consumption: 7 t (6.9 long tons; 7.7 short tons) of coal per hour
- Firebox
  - Grate area: 69.9 sq ft (6.49 m^{2})
- Boiler: 93 in (2,362 mm)
- Boiler pressure: 250 psi (1.7 MPa)
- Feedwater heater: Worthington BL
- Cylinders: 2
- Cylinder size: 30 1/2 in × 32 in (775 mm × 813 mm) bore × stroke
- Valve gear: Walschaerts
Performance figures
- Maximum speed: 50 mph (80 km/h); Top Rated Speed: 35 mph (56 km/h)
- Tractive effort: I1s—90,024 lbf (400.45 kN); I1sa—96,026 lbf (427.14 kN)
Career
- Operators: Pennsylvania Railroad
- Nicknames: Hippos
- Retired: 1950-1957
- Preserved: One: #4483
- Disposition: One: #4483 on display, remainder scrapped

The Pennsylvania Railroad (PRR) class I1s steam locomotives were the most numerous class of 2-10-0 "Decapods" in the United States. They were also the second-largest 2-10-0 locomotives in the country by weight and tractive effort (surpassed only by the Western Maryland class I-2). From 1916 to 1923, 598 locomotives were produced (123 at the railroad’s Altoona Works and 475 at Baldwin Locomotive Works). They were the dominant freight locomotive on the PRR system until World War II and remained in service until 1957. Nicknames for the type included Decs and Hippos, the latter due to their large boiler.

The I1s were known for being very powerful, slow freight haulers, with one author describing them as "the holy terror of the PRR". Its design was much larger than preceding 2-10-0s locomotives in the US, taking advantage of the PRR's heavy trackage and high allowed axle load, with a wide, free-steaming boiler. Enormous cylinders enabled the I1s to apply that power to the rails. Small drivers were used to improve tractive effort at the expense of higher speeds. Smaller drivers also allowed the placement of the large heavy belpaire firebox directly on top of powered drivers instead of over an unpowered trailing truck, which helped improve factor of adhesion. However, as a result, these locomotives were known for being rough riding at anything but low speeds, and unpopular with crews.

Subclass I1sa increased maximum steam cut-off to admit steam for 78% of the piston stroke (rather than the original 50%), boosting low speed tractive effort from 90,024 to 96,026 pounds-force (400.45 to 427.14 kN). There was no obvious external difference, except for a revised builders' plate and combination lever. The I1s locomotives were converted to I1sa during major overhauls; eventually, 489 were converted while 109 remained as I1s.

While the I1sa could technically reach a top speed of 50 mph (80 km/h), the Pennsylvania Railroad limited the max authorized speed at 35 mph (56 km/h). Anything above 35 mph became extremely shaky and resulted in poor ride quality. Engines were unable to be dynamically balanced to ride above 35 mph, and riding at higher speeds would frequently crack main pins.

I1s and I1sas were used all across the PRR system, in main line drag freight service, helper service, as yard switcher, hump yard lead, etc.

As built, all I1s had three blind center drivers. Around the mid-30s, flanges were added back onto drivers 2 and 4, leaving only the middle driver blind. This was done likely to improve tracking stability.

Appearance and configurations of these locomotives would vary depending on the region/division it operated under. Examples include certain engines receiving one of two different types of Worthington feedwater heaters, the addition of a second air pump on the engineer's side (and subsequent relocation of the displaced air tank to under the cab), larger tenders, and relocated sand lines. These engines would also receive standard fleet-wide modifications over the years, such as the "postwar beauty treatment" (swapping the headlight and generator positions near the front of the engine), removal and/or upgrade of marker and class lights, addition of the train control box, mechanical lubricator, reinforced spoke center driver, etc.

== Preservation ==
PRR 4483 was built in May 1923 and assigned to drag freight service. In February 1931, it was converted to an I1sa, increasing its tractive effort, and assigned to the Eastern Region, Susquehanna Division and Northern Region. On 1 November 1944, PRR 4483 was reassigned to the Eastern Region, Central PA Division and Williamsport Division and equipped with a cab signal, whistle and acknowledger. In the early 1950s, it was again reassigned to the PRR Ebenezer, often seen hauling coal drags up the Elmira Branch to the coal unloading docks in Sodus Bay on Lake Ontario, New York.

On 7 August 1957, 4483 was retired. In 1959, PRR 4483 was moved to the roundhouse in Northumberland, Pennsylvania. In 1963, the engine was purchased by the Westinghouse Air Brake Company to display on the front lawn of their headquarters in Wilmerding, Pennsylvania. The company had sought a railroad-themed display for its headquarters to commemorate its heritage of supplying air brakes to America's railroads. The locomotive saw little maintenance during this period. Westinghouse removed the boiler's asbestos cladding and performed some cosmetic work, but did very little else. Its condition would deteriorate significantly over the next two decades. In 1982, no longer wanting to keep the engine, Westinghouse offered it to whoever could move it off their property. This proved to be the Western New York Railway Historical Society, who acquired PRR 4483 and moved it to Hamburg, New York, where it now resides. Currently, the organization hopes to move the locomotive to the Heritage Discovery Center in Buffalo, New York to sit on public display.

== Accidents and incidents ==
- On July 31, 1940, two I1sa 2-10-0s were traveling with 74 freight cars from Columbus to Cleveland departed Arlington in Akron heading north when they collided with a Pennsylvania Railroad class GEW275 Doodlebug No. 4648, Both I1sa 2-10-0s were repaired after the accident but would be scrapped when the PRR dieselized.

== Gallery ==
PRR I1s #4300 in its Baldwin Locomotive Works builders' photo, taken in 1922.

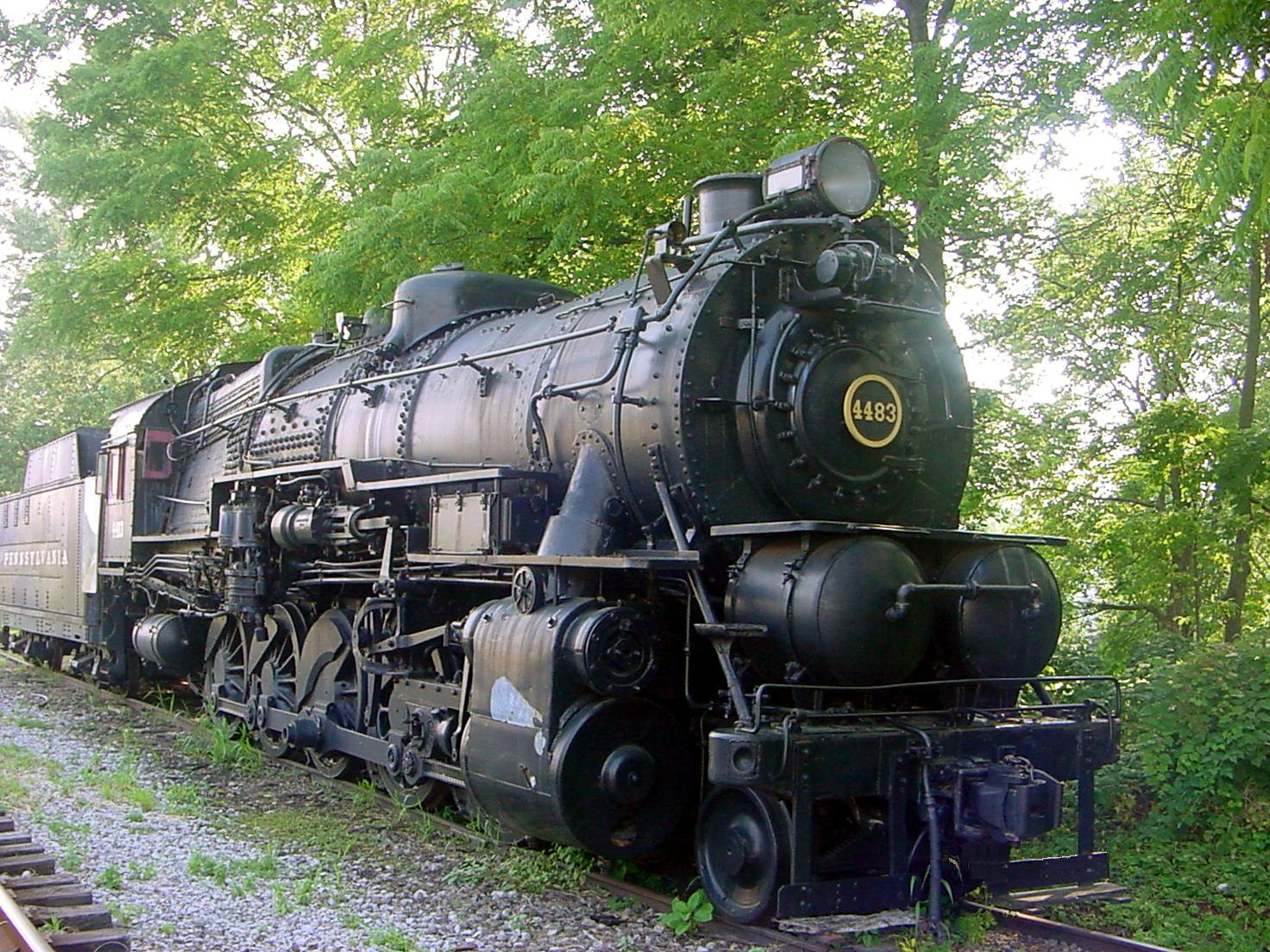
PRR I1sa #4483 currently being cosmetically restored at Hamburg, New York.

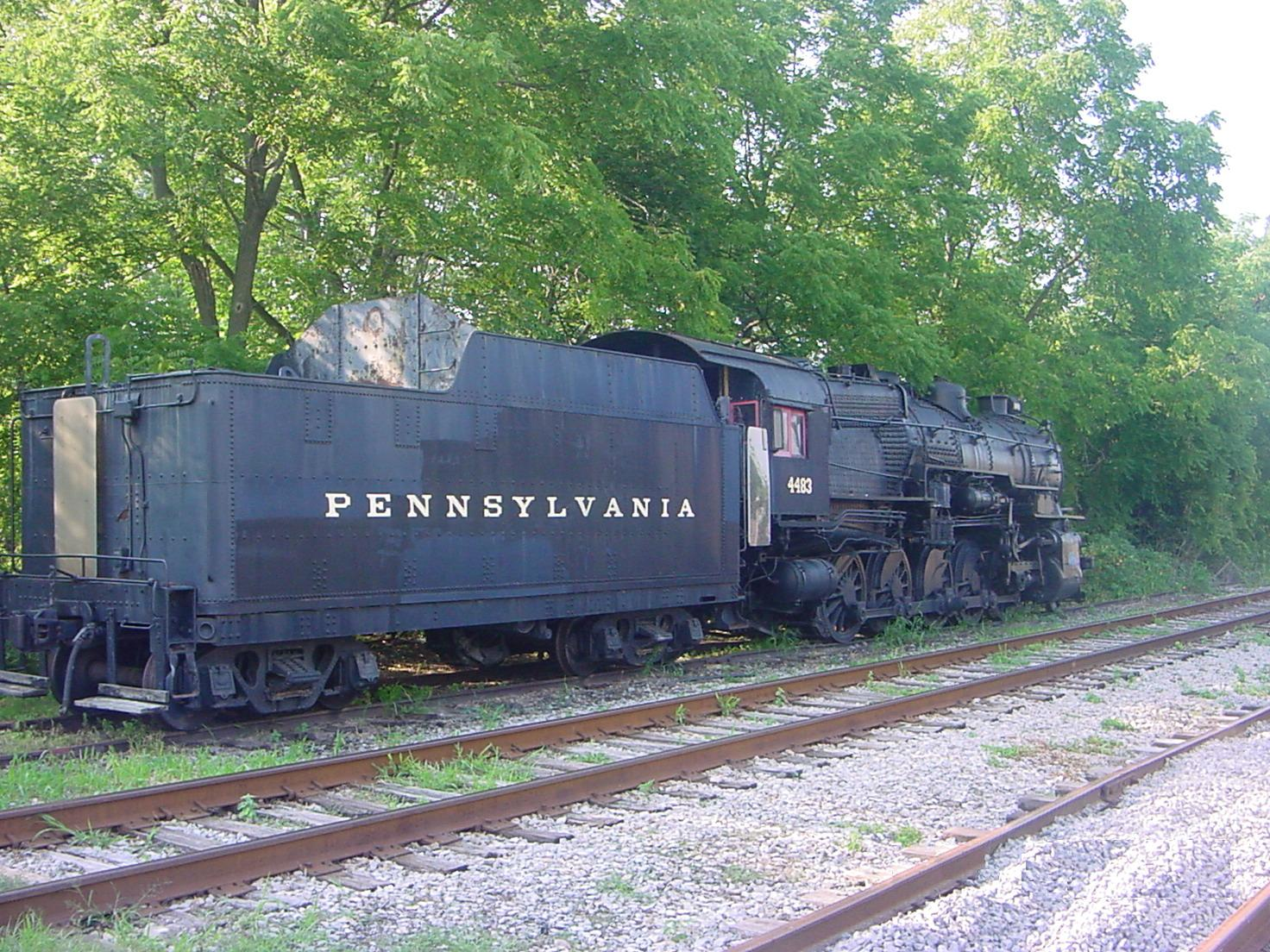
Tender view of 4483

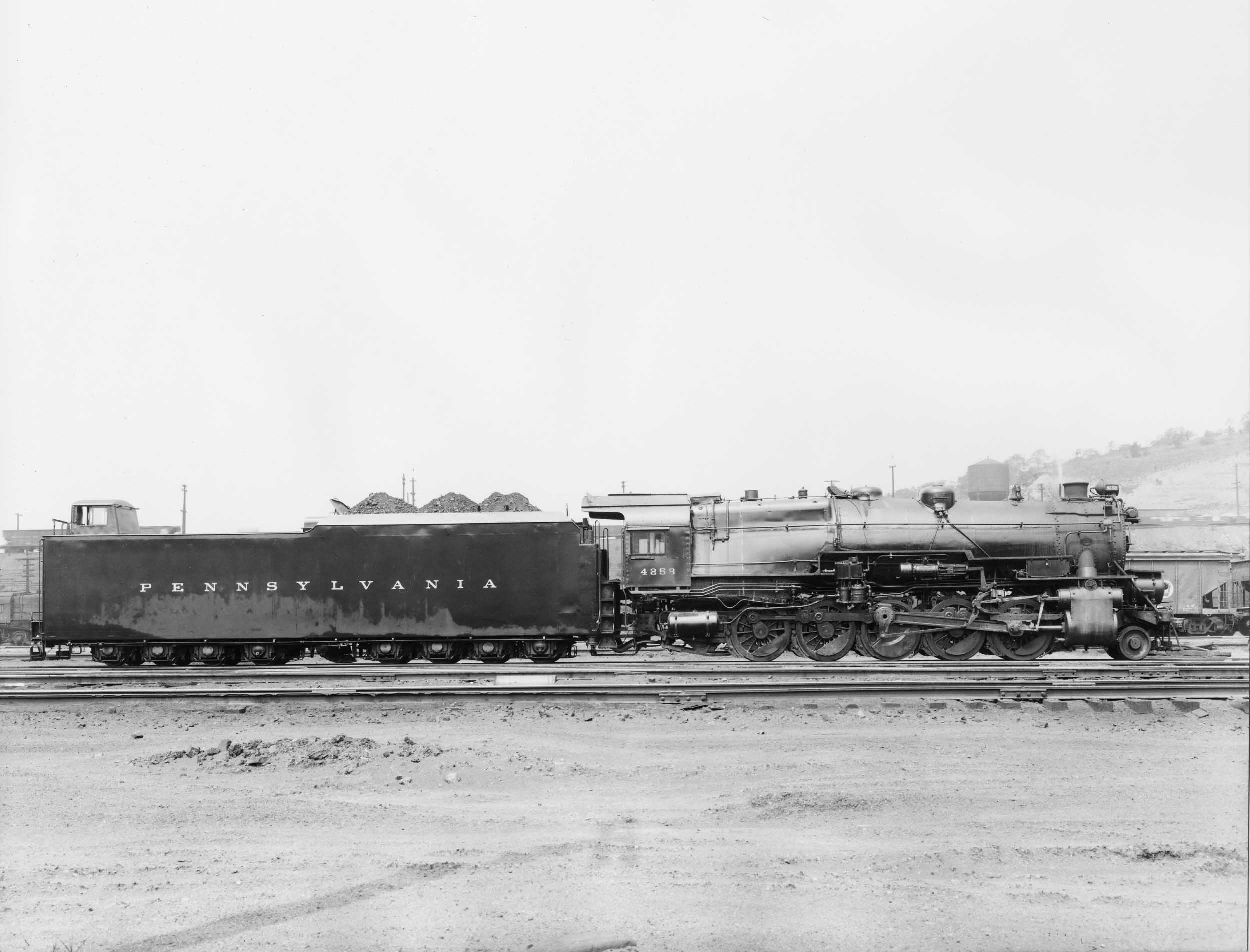
4258 with 210F75a "Coast-to-Coast" long haul tender.
