= USRA 0-6-0 =

Class of American two-cylinder 0-6-0 locomotive

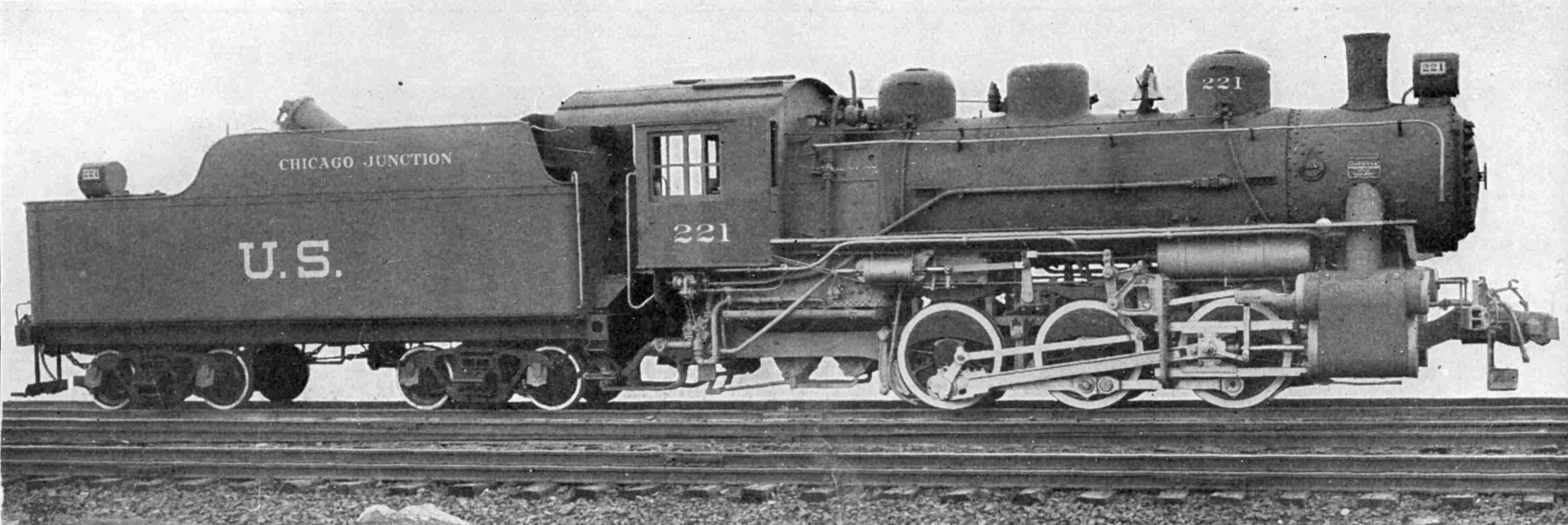
- New York Central (Chicago Junction) 221
Type and origin
- Power type: Steam
- Builder: ALCO
- Build date: 1918–1919 (originals)
- Total produced: 255 originals plus copies
Specifications
- Configuration
  - Whyte: 0-6-0
  - UIC: C h2
- Gauge: 4 ft 8 1/2 in (1,435 mm) standard gauge
- Driver dia.: 51 in (1,295 mm)
- Wheelbase: Locomotive: 11 ft 0 in (3.35 m); Loco & tender: 48 ft 10 1/2 in (14.90 m)
- Length: 62 ft 10 in (19.15 m) including tender
- Width: 10 ft 0 in (3.05 m)
- Height: 14 ft 0 1/2 in (4.28 m)
- Axle load: 55,000 lb (25,000 kg)
- Adhesive weight: 165,000 lb (75,000 kg)
- Loco weight: 165,000 lb (75,000 kg)
- Tender weight: 144,000 lb (65,000 kg)
- Total weight: 309,000 lb (140,000 kg)
- Fuel type: Coal
- Fuel capacity: 32,000 lb (15,000 kg)
- Water cap.: 8,000 US gal (30,000 L; 6,700 imp gal)
- Firebox
  - Grate area: 33 sq ft (3.07 m^{2})
- Boiler pressure: 190 psi (1.31 MPa)
- Heating surface
  - Firebox: 138 sq ft (12.8 m^{2})
  - Tubes: 1,233 sq ft (114.5 m^{2})
  - Flues: 515 sq ft (47.8 m^{2})
  - Total surface: 1,886 sq ft (175.2 m^{2})
- Superheater
  - Heating area: 442 sq ft (41.1 m^{2})
- Cylinders: Two
- Cylinder size: 21 in × 28 in (533 mm × 711 mm)
- Valve type: 10-inch (250 mm) piston valves
Performance figures
- Tractive effort: 39,100 lbf (173.9 kN)
- Factor of adh.: 4.22
Career
- Disposition: All original locomotives scrapped, three copies and two derivatives preserved.

The USRA 0-6-0 was a USRA standard class of steam locomotive designed under the control of the United States Railroad Administration, the nationalized railroad system in the United States during World War I. This was the standard light switcher locomotive of the USRA types, and was of 0-6-0 wheel arrangement in the Whyte notation, or "C" in UIC classification.

A total of 255 locomotives were built under USRA control; these were sent to the following railroads:

Table of original USRA allocation
Railroad	Quantity	Class	Road numbers	Notes
Atlantic Coast Line Railroad	10	E-9-S	1136–1145	
Baltimore and Ohio Railroad	40	D-30	350–389	
Central Railroad of New Jersey	10	B6s	101–110	
Chicago, Burlington and Quincy Railroad	10	G-5	500–509	Also 15 copies
Chicago Great Western Railway	5	B-6	480–484	
Chicago, Rock Island and Pacific Railroad	10	S-33	275–284	
Chicago, St. Paul, Minneapolis and Omaha Railway	8		75-82	
Chicago and North Western Railway	35	M-3	2601–2635	
Grand Trunk Railway	5	F11	801–805	to GTW 1824–1828, renumbered 7527–7531, Canadian National class O-19-a
Grand Trunk Western Railroad	5	F11	1744–1748	Renumbered 7522–7526, Canadian National class O-19-a
Maine Central Railroad	2	K	175–176	
Mobile and Ohio Railroad	10	40	40–49	Also 13 copies
New York Central Railroad subsidiary Chicago Junction	14	B-62	221–234	
Pennsylvania Railroad	30	B28s	Random between 7007 and 9405	
Pittsburgh and West Virginia Railway	2		20-21	
Seaboard Air Line Railroad	10	F-5	1090–1099	
St. Louis - San Francisco Railway	7	3800	3800–3806	
Texas and Pacific Railway	14	B-8	457–470	
Terminal Railroad Association of St. Louis	10		157-166	
Union Pacific Railroad	10	S-Spl	4600-4609	
Union Pacific subsidiary Oregon Short Line Railroad	5	S-Spl	4753–4757	
Washington Terminal Company	3		32-34	
Total	255			

After the dissolution of the USRA, the Atlantic Coast Line, Chicago, Burlington and Quincy, Chicago, St. Paul, Minneapolis and Omaha Railway, Gulf, Mobile and Ohio Railroad and Texas and Pacific Railway ordered additional copies of the USRA 0-6-0 design, while the Missouri Pacific Railroad and the Wheeling and Lake Erie Railway ordered only copies.

== Preservation ==
As of 2022, three USRA 0-6-0 copies are known to be preserved. Two are from the Wheeling and Lake Erie: 3960, which is awaiting a cosmetic restoration at the Age of Steam Roundhouse in Sugarcreek, Ohio, and 3984, which is undergoing an operational restoration at the Lorain and West Virginia Railway in Wellington, Ohio, and it is currently known as Nickel Plate Road 384. The third is 63, built by Alco in 1940 for the Alabama State Docks Commission. It has been on public display at the Kokosing Gap Trail in Mount Vernon, Ohio since 2002. 63 is currently in the best cosmetic shape of the three, but unfortunately, there are no plans to further restore it or make it operational.
