= Reversing gear =

Controller for the valves on a steam engine

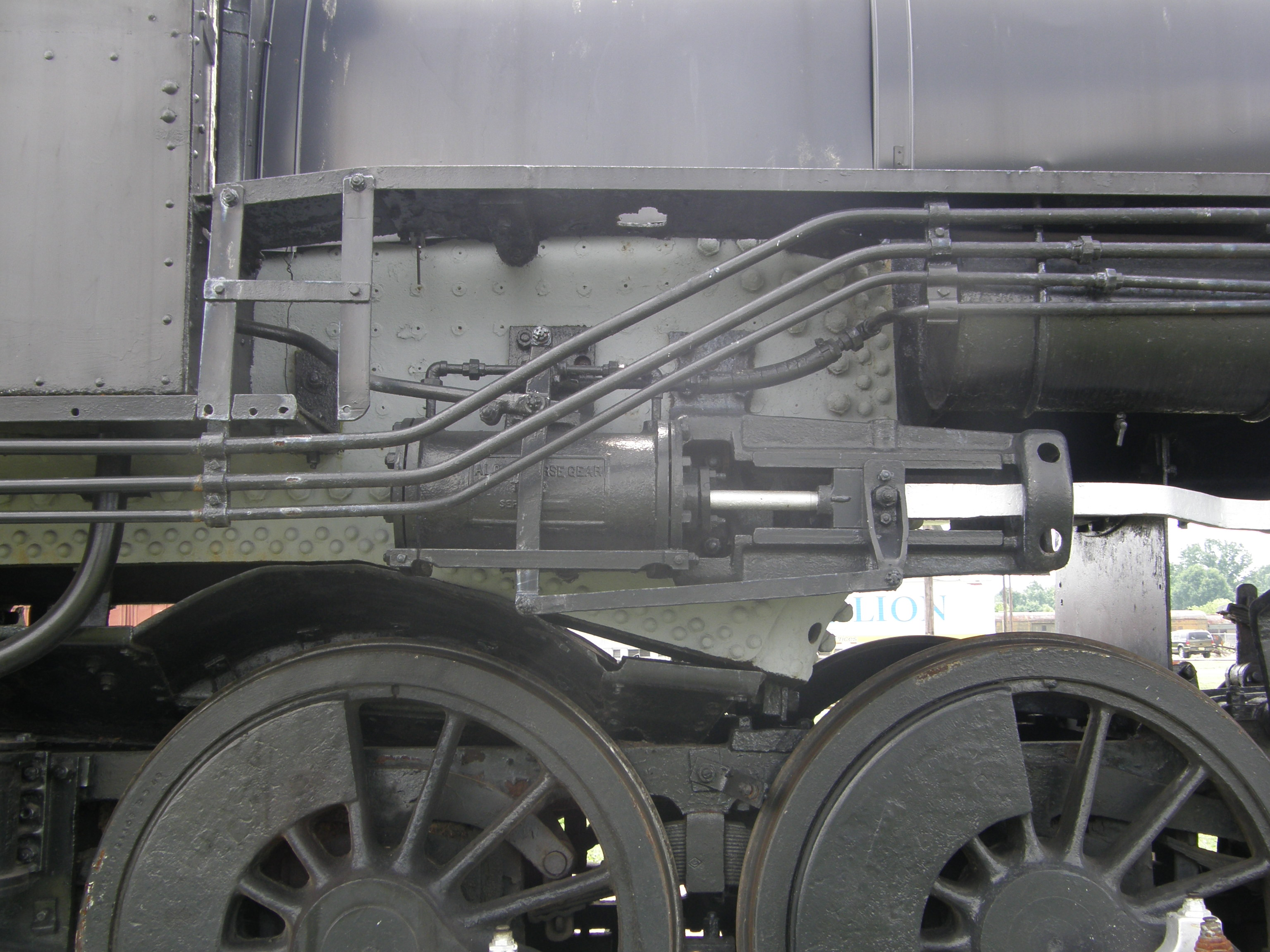
Steam reverser on a Southern Railway 2-8-0

Reversing gear is a mechanism used to both control the direction of travel of a steam locomotive and adjust its engine's steam cutoff.

== Reversing lever ==
The most common form of reversing gear uses a lever to engage (known as a Johnson bar in the United States) mounted parallel to the direction of travel on the driver’s side of the cab. It is controlled by a handle and sprung trigger at the top, and pivots at the bottom to pass between two notched sector plates. The reversing rod, which connects to the valve gear, is attached to the lever either above or below the pivot in an alignment that gives good leverage. A square pin is arranged to engage with notches cut in the plates and holds the lever (and valve gear) in the desired position when the trigger is released.

The advantages of this design are that change between forward and reverse gear can be made very quickly (as is needed in, for example, a shunting engine).

=== Limitations and drawbacks ===
The reversing lever has a catch mechanism which engages with a series of notches to hold the lever at the desired cut-off position. This means that the operator does not have a full choice of cut-off positions between maximum and mid-gear, but only those which correspond with the notches. The position of the notches is chosen by the locomotive designer or constructor with a view to the locomotive's intended purpose. In general engines designed for freight will have fewer notches with a 'longer' minimum cut-off (providing high tractive effort at low speeds but poor efficiency at high speeds) while a passenger locomotive will have more notches and a shorter minimum cut-off (allowing efficiency at high speeds at the expense of tractive effort). If the minimum cut-off provided for by the notches was too high, it would not be possible to run the locomotive in the efficient way described above (with a fully open regulator) without leading to steam wastage or 'choking' of the steam passages, so the regulator would have to be closed. That limits efficiency.

The Johnson bar is effectively part of the entire valve gear, being connected to the various linkages and arms in order to serve its function in adjusting them. This means that the forces in the valve gear can be transmitted to the lever. This is especially the case if the engine has unbalanced slide valves, which have a high operating friction and are subject to steam forces on both sides of the valve. This friction meant that if the Johnson bar is unlatched while the engine is operating under high steam pressure (wide regulator openings and high cut-off) or at high speeds, the forces that are supposed to act on the slide valves can instead be transmitted back through the linkage to the now-free reversing lever. This will suddenly and violently throw the lever into the full cut-off position, carrying with it the real danger of injury to the driver, damage to the valve gear and triggering wheel slip in the locomotive. The only way to prevent this is to close the regulator and allow the steam pressure in the valve chest to drop. The reversing lever can then be unlatched and set to a new cut-off position and then the regulator could be opened again. During this process the locomotive is not under power. On ascending gradients it was a matter of great skill to reduce the regulator opening by enough to safely unlatch the Johnson bar while maintaining sufficient steam pressure to the cylinders. Each time the regulator was re-opened was a chance to encounter wheel slip and in loose coupled trains each closure and opening of the regulator set up dynamic forces throughout the length of the train which risked broken couplings. The screw reverser overcame all these issues.

=== Ban in the US ===
The dangers of the traditional Johnson bar (which grew as locomotive power, weight and operating steam pressures increased through the first half of the 20th century) led to it being banned in the USA by the Interstate Commerce Commission. From 1939 all new-build steam locomotives had to be fitted with power reversers and from 1942 Johnson-bar–fitted engines undergoing heavy overhaul or rebuilding had to be retro-fitted with power reverse. Exceptions existed for light, low-powered locomotives and switchers (shunters). For switching, which required frequent changes of direction from full-ahead to full-reverse gear, the Johnson bar was favored because the change could be made quickly in a single motion instead of the multiple turns of the handle of a low-geared screw reverser.

== Screw reverser ==
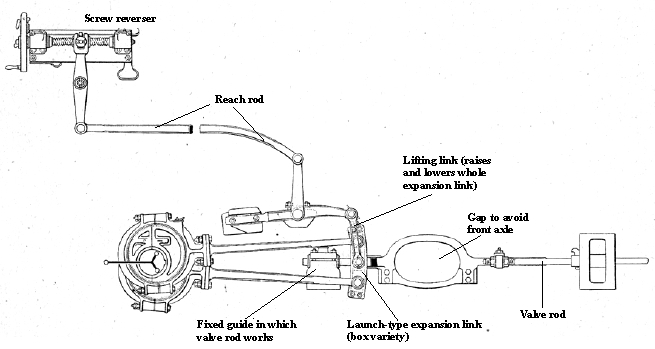
Diagram of Stephenson valve gear controlled by a screw reverser

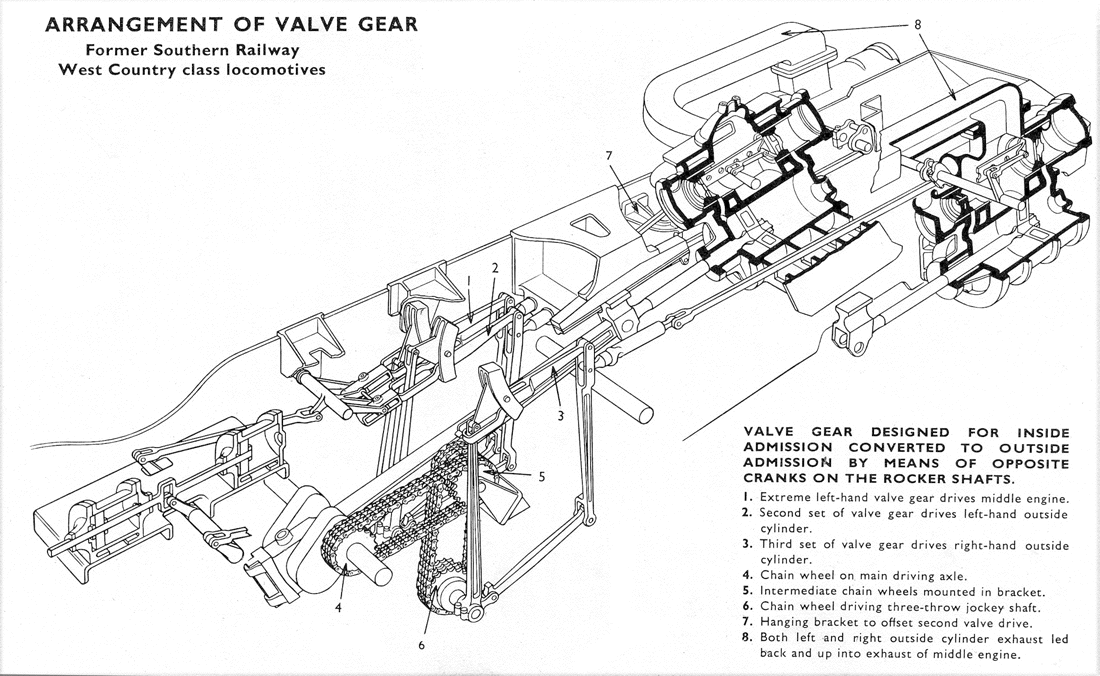
The two pistons of the steam reverser can be seen at the extreme left on this Bulleid Merchant Navy class.

In the screw reverser mechanism (sometimes called a bacon slicer in the UK), the reversing rod is controlled by a screw and nut, worked by a wheel in the cab. The nut either operates on the reversing rod directly or through a lever, as above. The screw and nut may be cut with a double thread (aka two-start) and a coarse pitch to move the mechanism as quickly as possible. The wheel is fitted with a locking lever to prevent creep and there is an indicator to show the percentage of cutoff in use. This method of altering the cutoff offers finer control than the sector lever, but it has the disadvantage of slow operation. It is most suitable for long-distance passenger engines where frequent changes of cutoff are not required and where fine adjustments offer the most benefit. On locomotives fitted with Westinghouse air brake equipment and Stephenson valve gear, it was common to use the screw housing as an air cylinder, with the nut extended to form a piston. Compressed air from the brake reservoirs was applied to one side of the piston to reduce the effort required to lift the heavy expansion link, with gravity assisting in the opposite direction.

=== Power reverse gear ===
With larger engines, the linkages involved in controlling cutoff and direction grew progressively heavier and there was a need for power assistance in adjusting them. Steam (later, compressed air) powered reversing gears were developed in the late 19th and early 20th centuries. Typically, the operator worked a valve that admitted steam to one side or the other of a cylinder connected to the reversing mechanism until the indicator showed the intended position. A second mechanism—usually a piston in an oil-filled cylinder held in position by closing a control cock—was required to keep the linkages in place.

Stirling gear

The first locomotive engineer to fit such a device was James Stirling of the Glasgow and South Western Railway in 1873. Several engineers then tried them, including William Dean of the GWR and Vincent Raven of the North Eastern Railway, but they found them little to their liking, mainly because of maintenance difficulties: any oil leakage from the locking cylinder, either through the piston gland or the cock, allowed the mechanism to creep, or worse “nose-dive”, into full forward gear while running. Stirling moved to the South Eastern Railway and Harry Smith Wainwright, his successor at that company, incorporated them into most of his designs, which were in production about thirty years after Stirling’s innovation. Later still the forward-looking Southern Railway engineer Oliver Bulleid fitted them to his famous Merchant Navy Class of locomotives, but they were mostly removed at rebuild.

Henszey's reversing gear

Patented in 1882, the Henszey's reversing gear illustrates a typical early solution. Henszey's device consists of two pistons mounted on a single piston rod. Both pistons are double-ended. One is a steam piston to move the rod as required. The other, containing oil, holds the rod in a fixed position when the steam is turned off. Control is by a small three-way steam valve (“forward”, “stop”, “back”) and a separate indicator showing the position of the rod and thus the percentage of cutoff in use. When the steam valve is at “stop”, an oil cock connecting the two ends of the locking piston is also closed, thus holding the mechanism in position. The piston rod connects by levers to the reversing gear, which operates in the usual way, according to the type of valve gear in use.

The Ragonnet power reverser

The Ragonnet power reverse, patented in 1909, was a true feedback controlled servomechanism. The power reverse amplified small motions of the reversing lever made in the locomotive cab with modest force into much larger and more forceful motions of the reach rod that controlled the engine cutoff and direction. It was usually air powered, but could also be steam powered. The term servomotor was explicitly used by the developers of some later power reverse mechanisms. The use of feedback control in these later power reverse mechanisms eliminated the need for a second cylinder for a hydraulic locking mechanism, and it restored the simplicity of a single operating lever that both controlled the reversing linkage and indicated its position.

=== Power reverse impetus ===
The development of articulated locomotives was a major impetus to the development of power reverse systems, because these typically had two or even three sets of reverse gear, instead of just one on a simple locomotive. The Baldwin Locomotive Works used the Ragonnet reversing gear, and other US builders generally abandoned positive locking features sooner than later. Many American locomotives were built, or retro-fitted, with power reversers, including the PRR K4s, PRR N1s, PRR B6, and PRR L1s, but in Britain locking cylinders remained in use. The Hadfield reversing gear, patented in 1950, was in most particulars a Ragonnet reversing gear with added locking cylinder. Most Beyer Garratt locomotives used the Hadfield system.

== See also ==
- Vehicular Johnson bar

== Sources ==
- Allen, Cecil J; (1949); Locomotive Practice and Performance in the Twentieth Century; W. Heffer and Sons Ltd.; Cambridge
- Bell, A. Morton; (1950); Locomotives : Volume one; Seventh edition; London, Virtue and Company Ltd.
