= Soft coal =

Soft coal may refer to several lower quality types of coal, primarily used for power generation:

- Lignite, or brown coal
- Sub-bituminous coal
- Bituminous coal, or black coal
