= Drag freight =

Long, slow and heavy trains often carrying bulk commodities

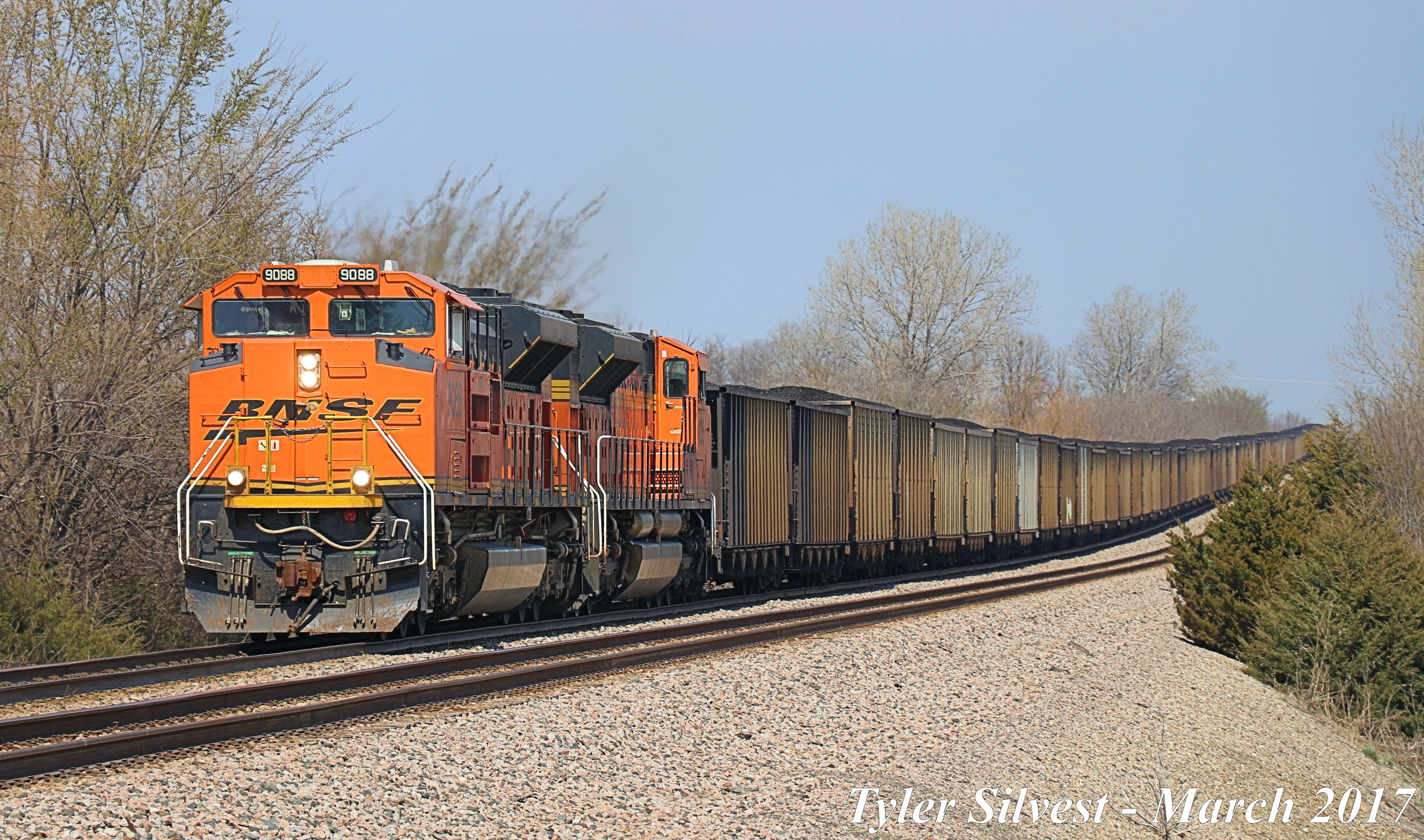
A BNSF loaded coal drag in Kansas

A drag freight is a lengthy, slower moving, high-tonnage railroad train, often carrying bulk commodities such as coal or ore. Compared to "fast freight" trains, drag freight trains have a very low power-to-weight ratio, making these trains somewhat unpredictable on steep grades or hilly routes. This causes many dispatchers to be extremely conservative with how they handle drag freights, especially when they share lines with higher priority fast freights and passenger trains.

== Power ==
Before and during WWI and into the 1920s, large steam locomotives such as the 2-8-2 Mikado or mainly larger types like articulated locomotives or larger rigid-frame wheel arrangements such as the 2-10-4 Texas were typically used for these drag freight operations.

After the railroads dieselized, heavy duty diesel locomotives (typically six-axle units, to improve adhesion) were used for the drag freight trains. Multiple unit operations allowed one person to control multiple locomotives. Locomotive numbers vary, but there were as many as 4 to 11 locomotives may be used for a heavy haul drag freight. Attempts were made to develop ultra-large locomotives for this purpose, such as the Union Pacific DDA40X and gas-turbine locomotives.

When AC traction motors and thyristor inverters became available, locomotives such as EMD SD70MAC and the GE AC4400CW replaced the older EMD SD40 on a three-for-two basis.

== United Kingdom ==
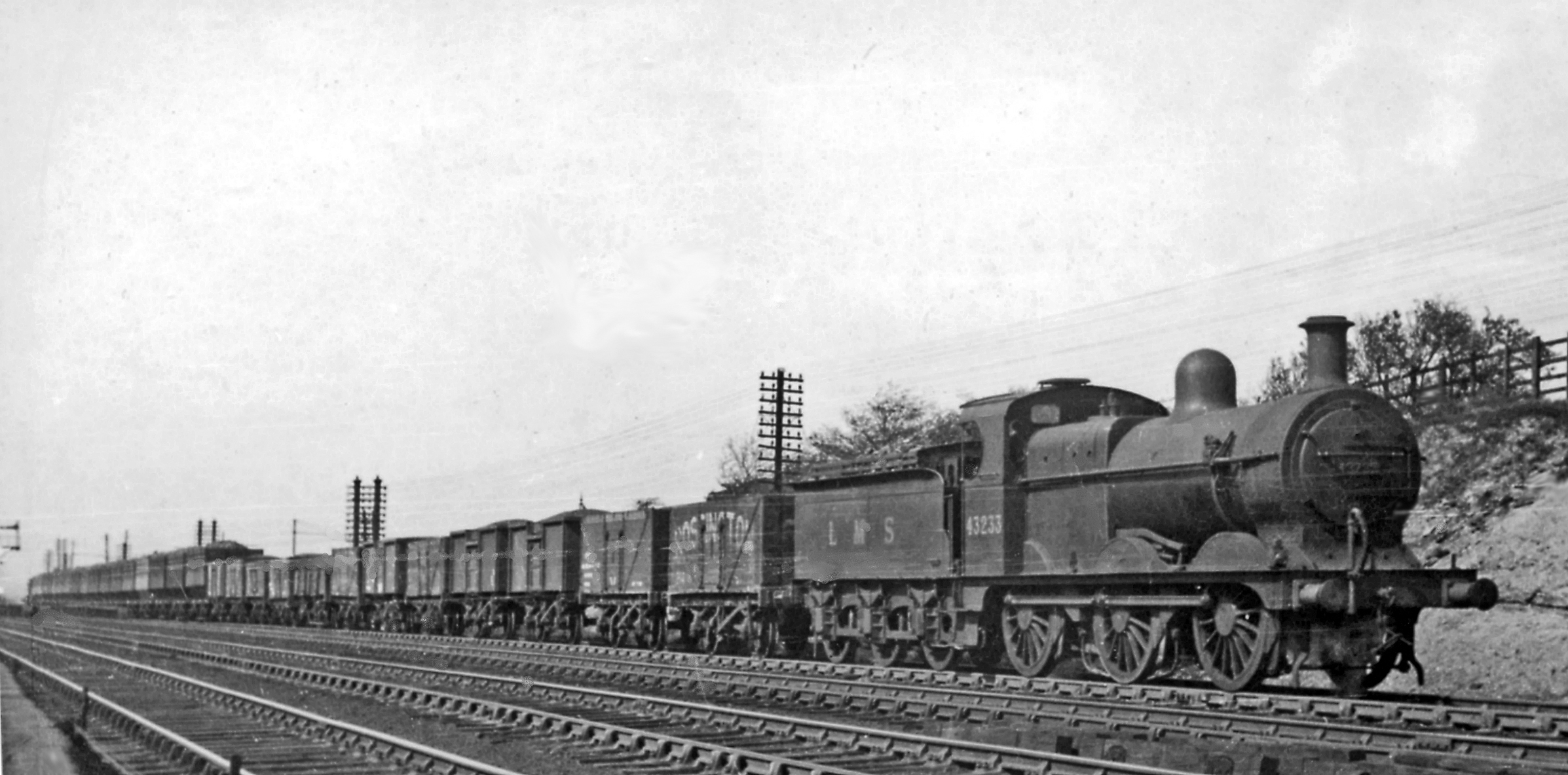
Mineral goods train hauled by a single six-coupled LMS steam locomotive.

In the UK, such trains were called mineral trains and the locomotives that hauled them were called mineral locomotives. An example of a mineral locomotive was the LNWR 17in Coal Engine.

The trains thereof were loose-coupled, had no continuous brakes, and were speed-limited to 25 mph (40 km/h). The lack of brake power was a potential hazard and, when approaching a downhill gradient, it was necessary to stop the train and "pin down" the handbrakes on some of the wagons before proceeding.

Today, Class 60 and Class 66 locomotives owned by the DB Cargo UK and Freightliner Heavy Haul are used on their drag freights. Also, Class 59 locomotives owned by National Power, Foster Yeoman, and other large bulk shippers were used on the heavy freights in the 1990s. Because of coupling limits, only single units were used for these trains.

== Australia ==
Australian drag freight trains (iron ore) are some of the world longest freight trains around. These trains usually go over 2 kilometers, or 1.2 miles. Like in the United States, six axle locomotives are used to provide better adhesion.

Different high horsepower locomotives are used for the Australian iron ore trains. Locomotives used for these long trains are the GE AC6000CW, GE Dash 8, and EMD SD70ACE.

There are trains where these drag freight trains are automated.
