= St. Louis–San Francisco 1630 =

Preserved American 2-10-0 locomotive

St. Louis–San Francisco Railway 1630
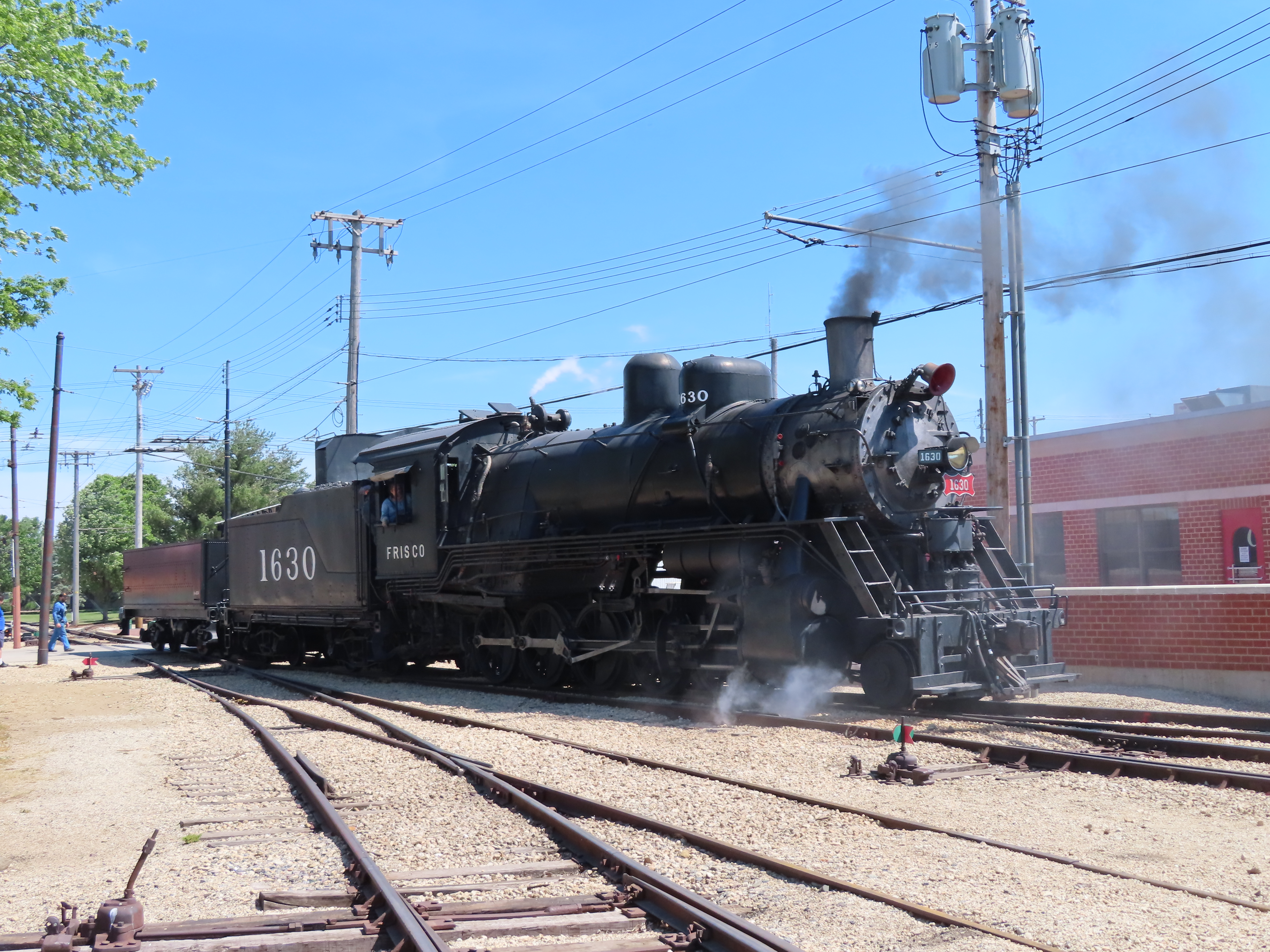
- No. 1630 at the Illinois Railway Museum, June 5, 2021
Type and origin
- Power type: Steam
- Builder: Baldwin Locomotive Works
- Serial number: 47953
- Model: 12-42 F
- Build date: 1918
Specifications
- Configuration
  - Whyte: 2-10-0
- Gauge: 4 ft 8 1/2 in (1,435 mm)
- Length: 71 ft 0 in (22 m)
- Height: 16 ft 2 in (5 m)
- Axle load: 37,000 lb (17,000 kg)
- Adhesive weight: 185,000 lb (84,000 kg)
- Loco weight: 210,000 lb (95,000 kg)
- Fuel type: Coal
- Boiler pressure: 180 psi (1 MPa)
- Cylinders: Two, outside
- Cylinder size: 24 in × 28 in (610 mm × 711 mm)
- Valve gear: Walschaerts
- Valve type: Piston valves
- Loco brake: Air
- Train brakes: Air
- Couplers: Knuckle
Performance figures
- Tractive effort: 47,454 lbf (211 kN)
Career
- Operators: United States Railroad Administration; Pennsylvania Railroad (leased); St. Louis-San Francisco Railway; Eagle-Picher Mining and Smelting Company; Illinois Railway Museum
- Class: Ye
- Numbers: USRA 1147; PRR 1147; SLSF 1630; EPLX 1630
- Retired: 1957
- Preserved: 1967
- Restored: September 28, 1972
- Current owner: Illinois Railway Museum
- Disposition: Undergoing 1,472-day inspection and overhaul

St. Louis–San Francisco Railway 1630 is a preserved Ye class 2-10-0 "Decapod" type steam locomotive, built in 1918 by the Baldwin Locomotive Works (BLW) for the United States Railroad Administration (USRA), it is owned and operated by the Illinois Railway Museum (IRMX) in Union, Illinois. Today, No. 1630 is currently one of two operating Decapods in service in America, the other being former Great Western No. 90 at the Strasburg Rail Road (SRC) outside of Strasburg, Pennsylvania.

== History ==
=== Revenue service ===
No. 1630 was built in 1918 by the Baldwin Locomotive Works (BLW) for use in Russia as a Ye class locomotive. However, it, along with about 200 other locomotives, remained in the United States because the Bolshevik government could not pay for them after the Russian Revolution. It was converted from 5 ft (1,524 mm) Russian track gauge to 4 ft 8 1/2 in (1,435 mm) standard gauge. After being re-gauged, the locomotive was sold to the United States Railroad Administration (USRA) in March 1918 and was numbered to No. 1147. Shortly after in April 1918, it was briefly leased for use on the Pennsylvania Railroad (PRR).

In November 1920, the locomotive was sold to the St. Louis – San Francisco Railway (SLSF), also known as the "Frisco", where it was renumbered to No. 1630 and used as a mixed traffic engine. In November 1951, the locomotive was sold to the Eagle-Picher Mining and Smelting Company, which used it to haul lead ore from the mine to their smelter yard, it would continue to haul lead for Eagle-Picher until the mine closed and ceased operations in 1957, No. 1630 was withdrawn from service and put into storage for the next ten years.

=== Excursion service ===
In December 1965, the Eagle-Picher donated No. 1630 to the Illinois Railway Museum (IRMX) in Union, Illinois. No. 1630 would remain as a static display for four years until 1971, when the IRMX decided to return the engine to operating condition to haul excursion trains for the museum; after a year of work, No. 1630 was fired up and made its first movements under its own power on September 28, 1972, it hauled its first excursion train for the museum two months later on November 28.

The locomotive would haul the museum's excursion trains for thirty-two years until it was taken out of service in 2004 for a major rebuild; after more than nine years of undergoing repairs and a federally mandated rebuild, it was returned back to operating condition on October 30, 2013.

On Memorial Day weekend 2014, the locomotive returned to excursion service. In 2016, the locomotive received a cylinder overhaul, which, according to Steam department volunteer Nigel Bennett, made the locomotive "probably more powerful than she has been since her [sic] first arrival at IRM in the 1970’s." The locomotive, during Memorial Day weekend 2016, pulled 135 empty coal cars in storage at the museum as what was considered to be one of the longest revenue freight trains powered by a steam locomotive in at least 25 years, Bennett said.

On September 15, 2018, No. 1630 celebrated its 100th birthday where it operated and hauled excursions for the museum's annual Museum Showcase Weekend. On September 7, 2024, No. 1630 operated in a special night photo session.

On April 30, 2025, due to a discovery of a mechanical issue, it was announced by the museum that the locomotive would be taken out of service to undergo its mandated Federal Railroad Administration (FRA) 1,472-day inspection, which was originally scheduled for 2029. The museum hopes to have No. 1630 back up and running again before the museum's 75th anniversary in 2028.

== Appearances in media ==
- In 1992, the locomotive appeared in the movie A League of Their Own as well as, in 1991, the locomotive appeared in the movie The Babe in the transportation scenes, which were both filmed at IRM.

== See also ==
- Chicago and North Western 1385
- McCloud Railway 19
- Polson Logging Co. 2
- Soo Line 1003
- Soo Line 2719
