= Museum for Railway Technology Novosibirsk =

Museum in Novosibirsk, Russia

- Новосибирский музей железнодорожной техники Novosibirskiy muzey zheleznodorozhnoy tekhniki
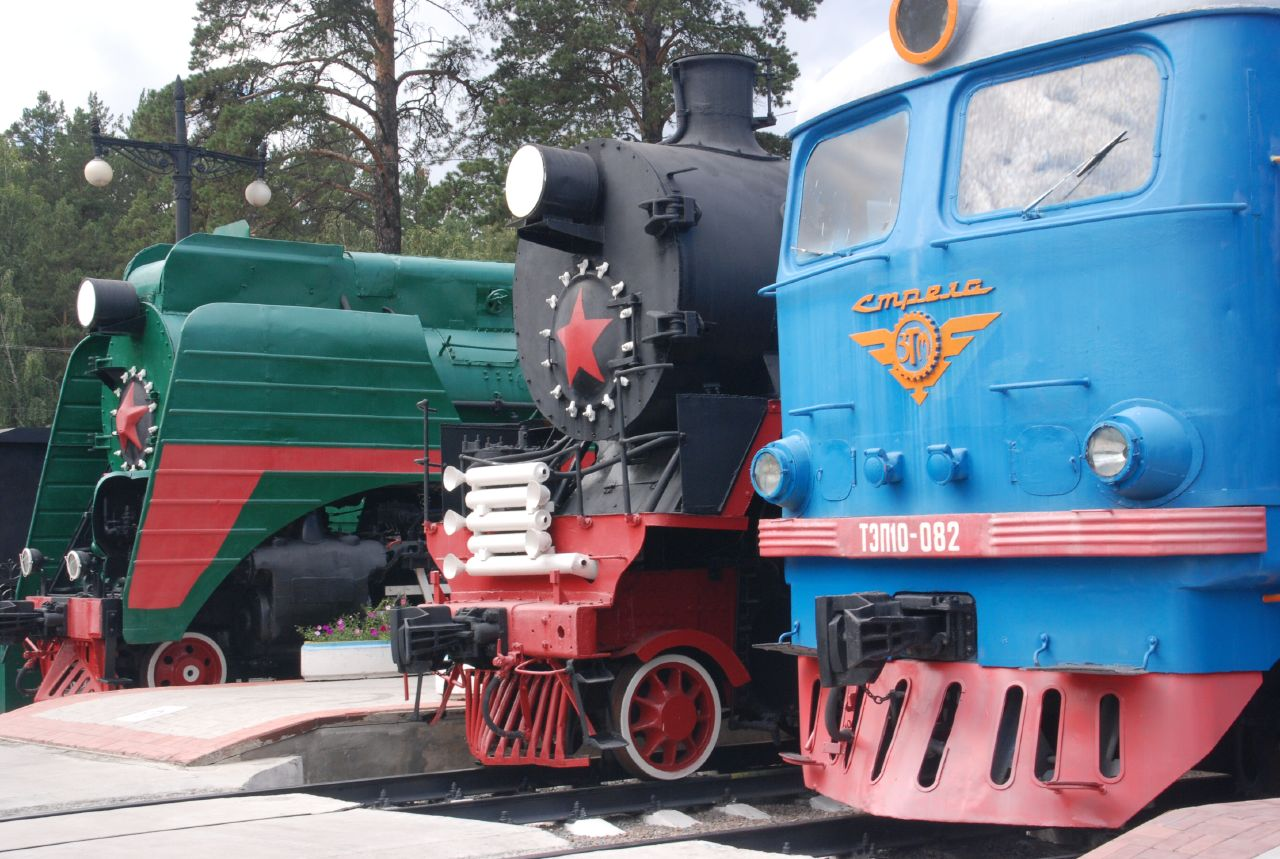
- Locomotives
- Established: 4 August 2000
- Location: Rasesnaja Street 35 (Разъездная ул. 35); Novosibirsk
- Coordinates: 54.869157°N 83.076008°E

The Museum for Railway Technology Novosibirsk (Russian: Новосибирский музей железнодорожной техники, Novosibirskiy muzey zheleznodorozhnoy tekhniki) is a railway museum in Novosibirsk. It was formally opened in 2000 near Seyatel railway station (станцией Сеятель), at the Novosibirsk–Berdsk line and is the second largest transport museum in Russia after the Central Railway Museum in St Petersburg.

== History ==
Nikolai Akulinin was the founder of the museum. He worked from 1946 to 1955 at the North Caucasus Railway and since 1955 at various railways in Siberia. After retiring in 1984, he started to work on the collection of the museum for several years, storing the relevant exhibits on the circular track of the All-Russian Railway Research Institute. In 1998 the West Siberian Railway endorsed the establishment of a museum. Preparatory work lasted until 2000, when the museum was formally inaugurated on 4 August 2000 during the celebrations of the Railway Day. Contrary to his wish, it was named after Nikolai Akulininas, who was also its first director.

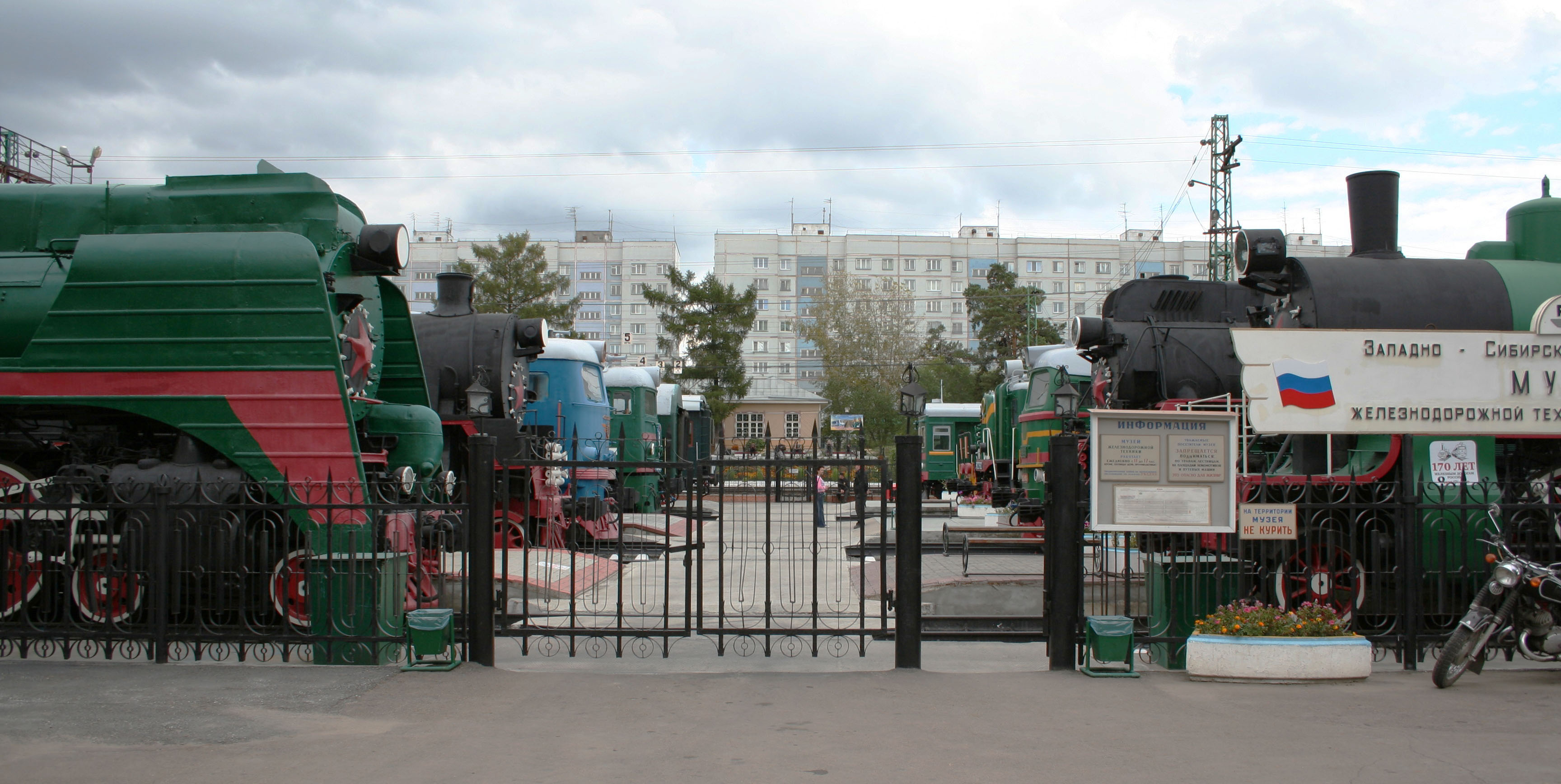
Entrance

The open-air museum presents 17 steam locomotives, 15 diesel locomotives, 12 electro locomotives, carriages and paraphernalia from the 19th and 20th century, mainly from Russian and Soviet production. In addition, some locomotives from the United States, Czechoslovakia and Hungary are exhibited. The museum has also a collection of mainly Soviet cars, and since 2006 some foreign classic cars.

The museum has also an educational obligation: It organises seminars and conferences, which cover a wide variety of railway related topics.

== Exhibits ==
=== Steam locomotives ===
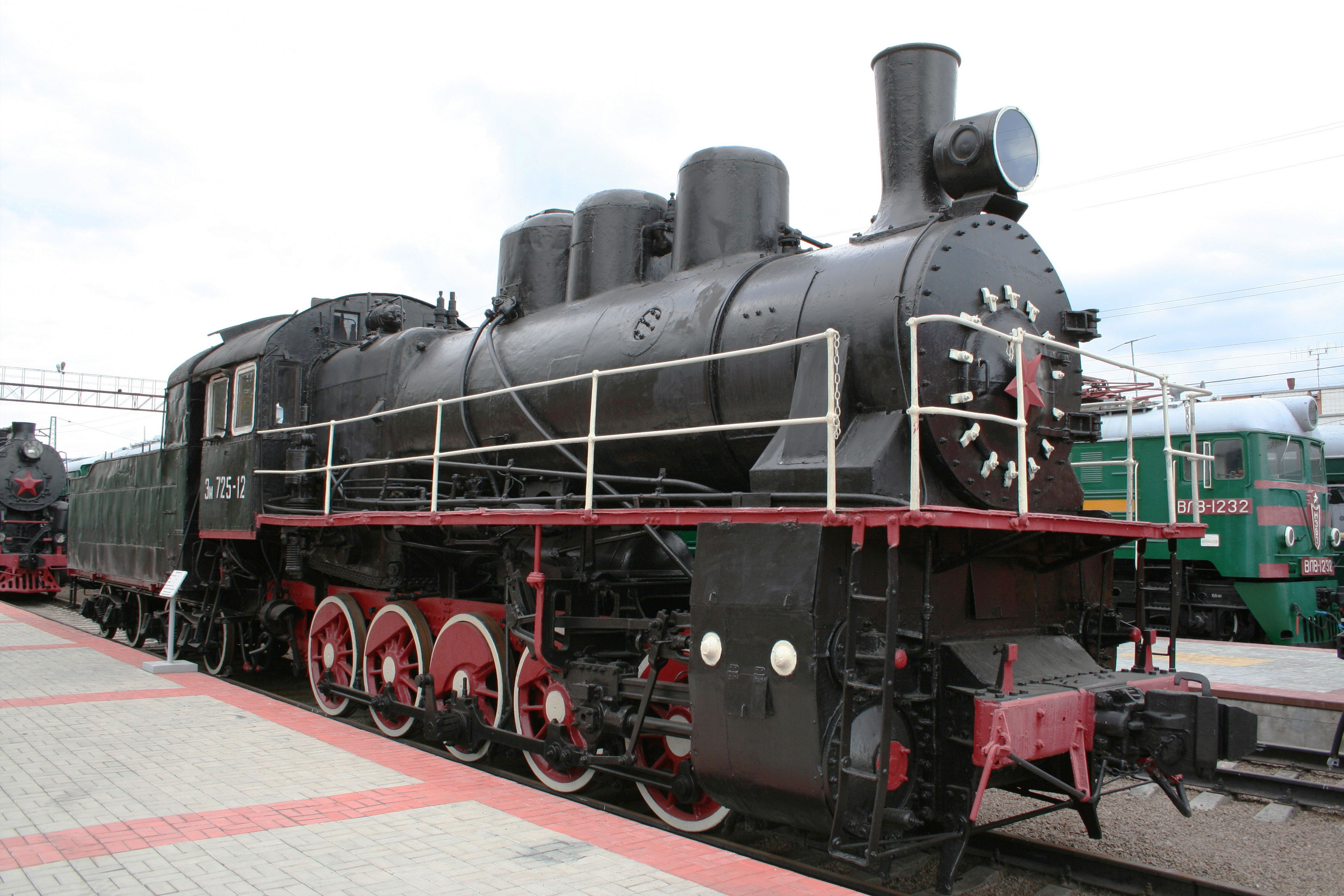
Steam locomotive Эм-725-12

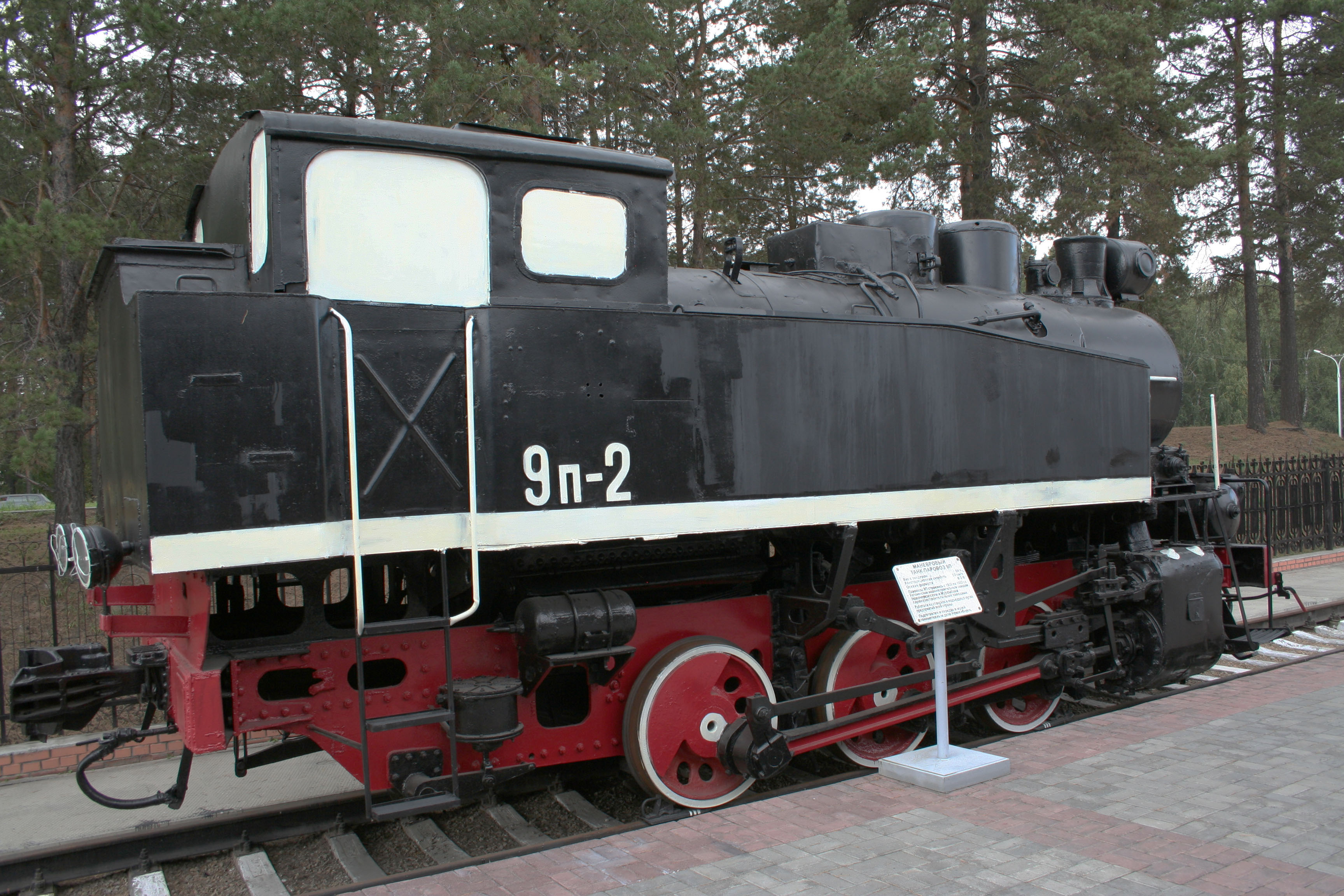
Steam locomotive 9П-2

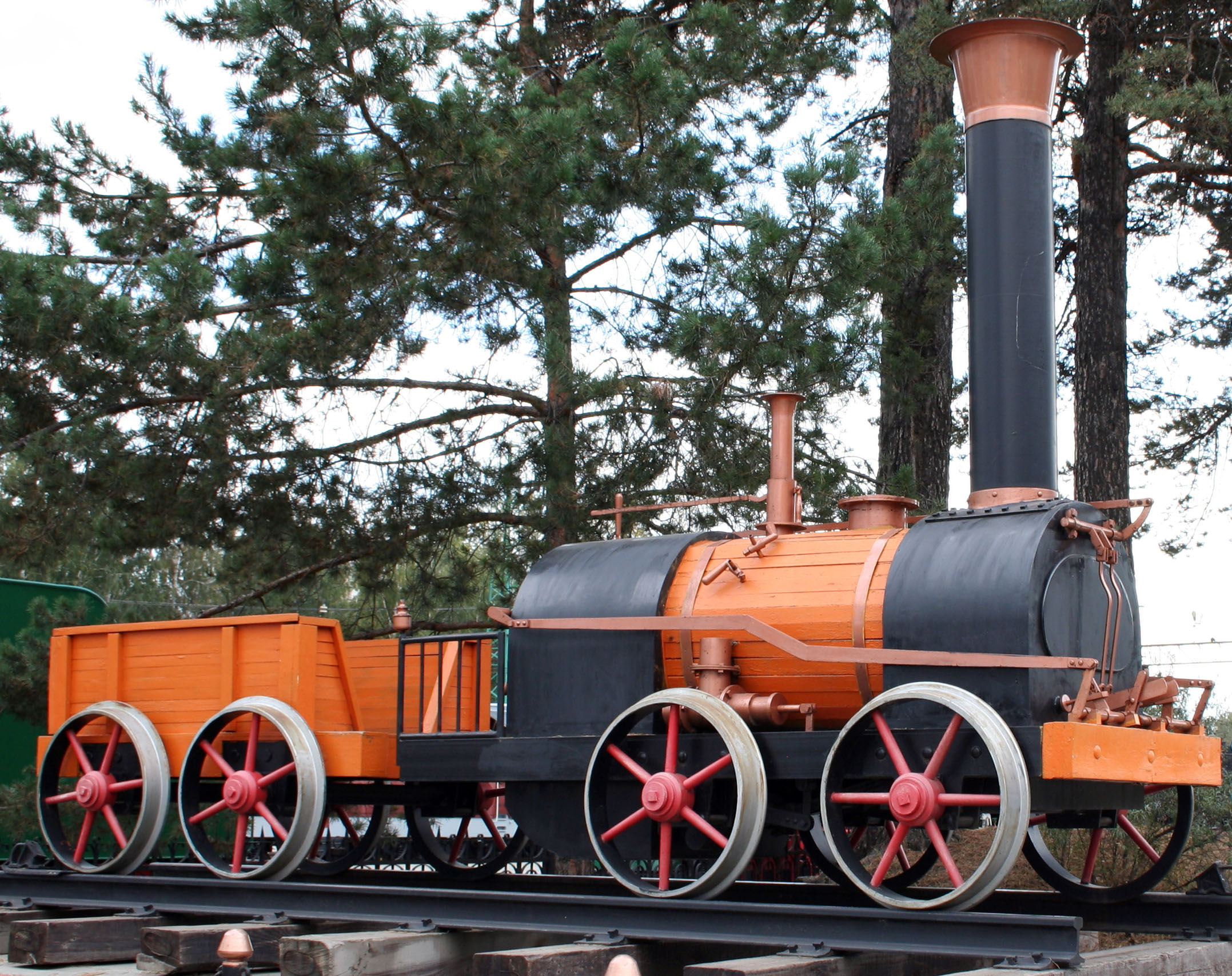
Replica of the first Russian steam locomotive

Steam locomotives П36 (097), 9П (-2), Ea (N3078), L (-3993), L (N013), LW (040), SO (N17-508), Su (213-42), FD20 (588), Em (725-12), Er (789-91) and a replica made in 2002 of the first steam locomotive built by Yefim and Miron Cherepanov in 1833–1834.

=== Diesel locomotives ===
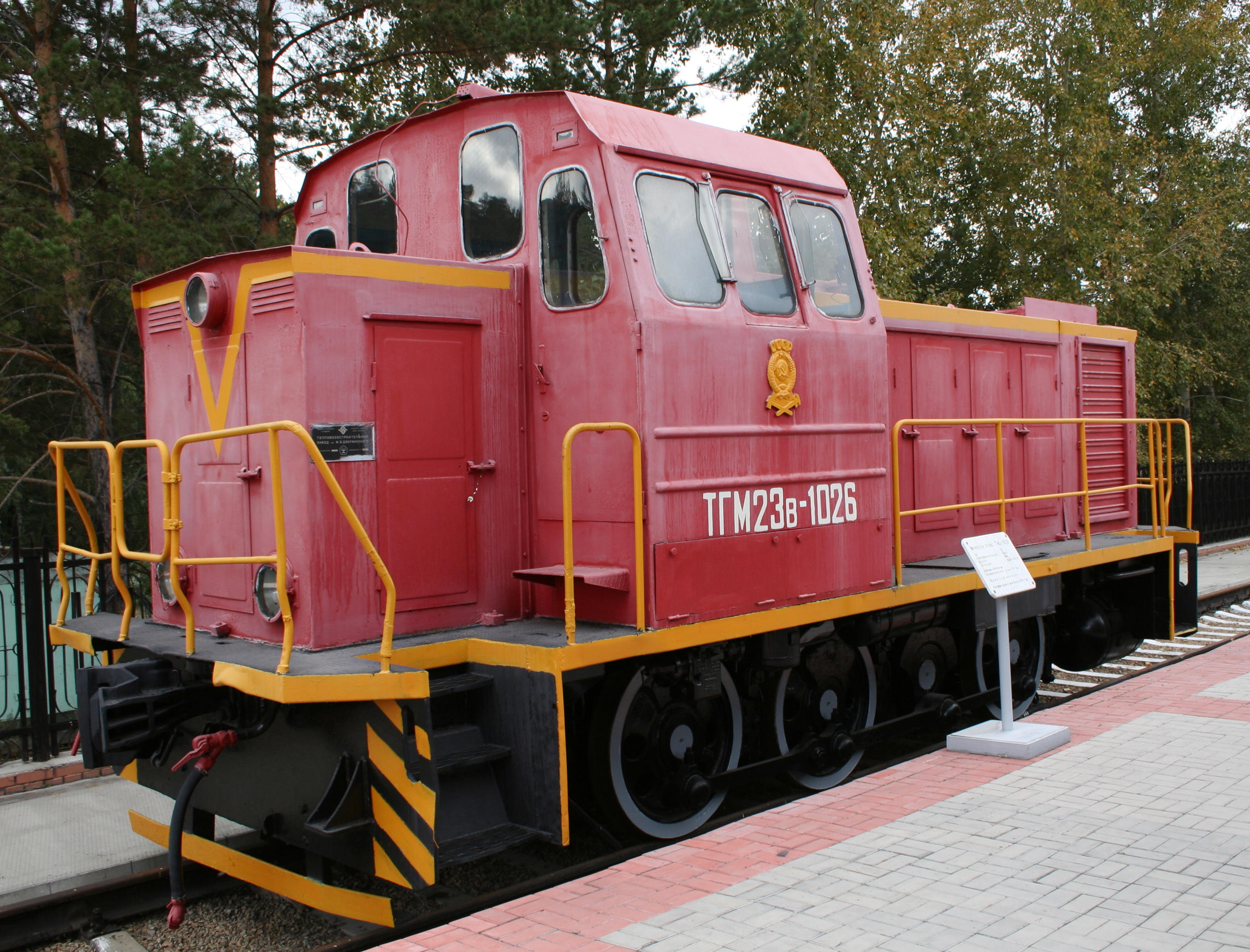
Diesel locomotive ТГМ23в-1026

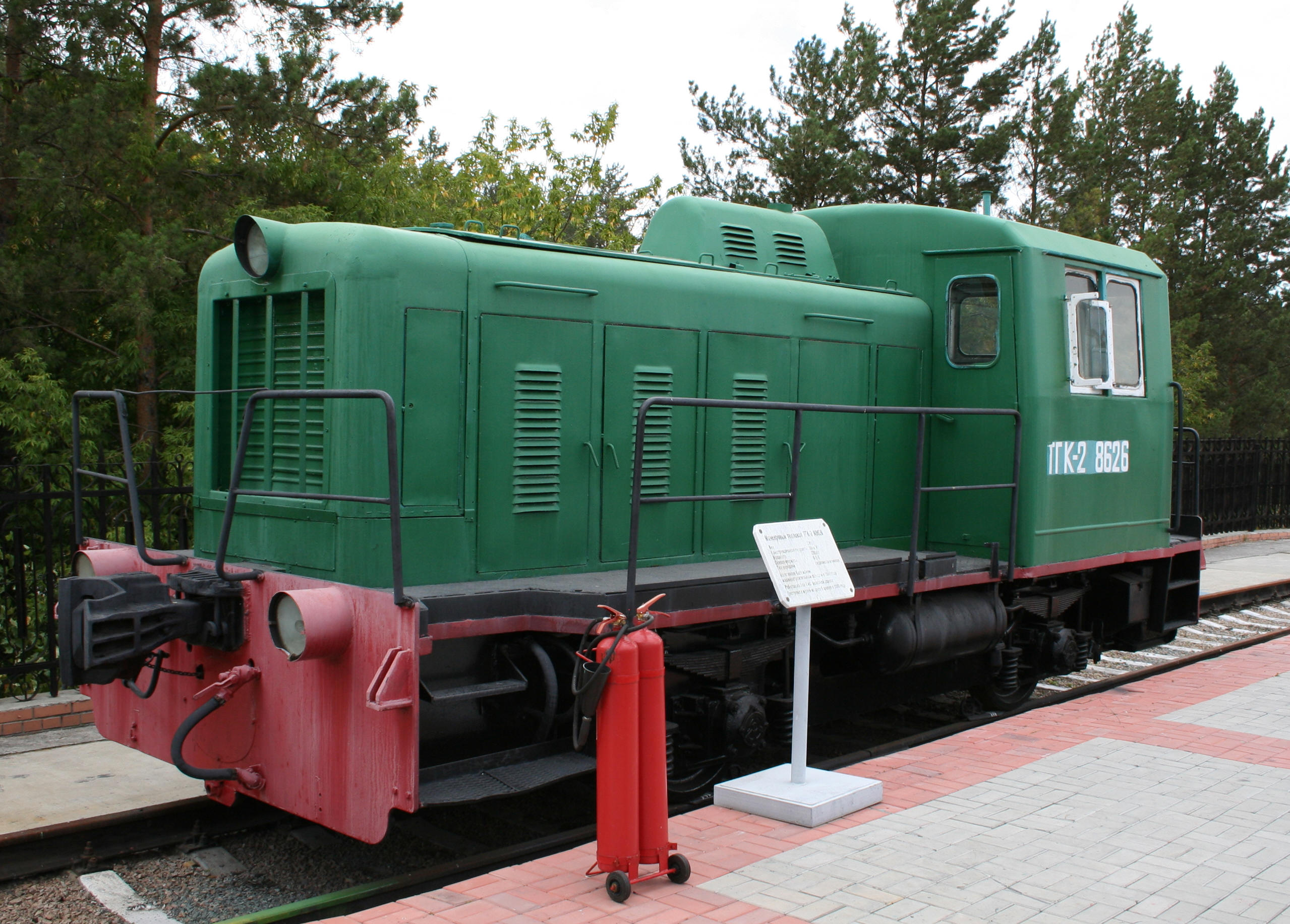
Diesel locomotive ТГК2

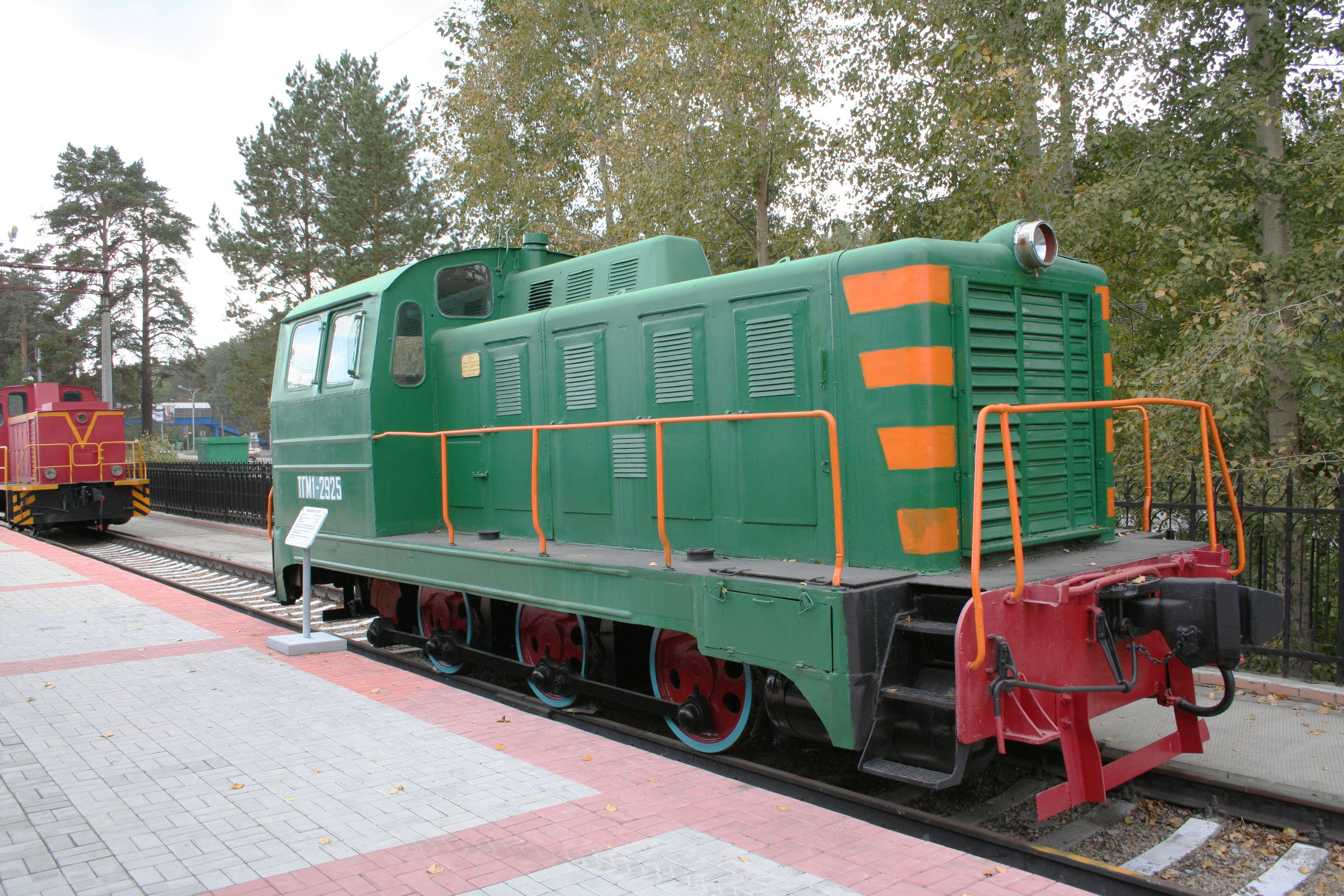
Diesel locomotive ТГМ1 No.2925

Diesel locomotives LTS M62 (500), ТЭМ2 (2110), CzME3 (-5452), CzS3 (-73), TE10L, TE10M (-2670), 2TE116 (-037), TGM23b (1026), TGM1 (2925), TGM4 (1676), TGK (8626), TE2 (289), TEM2 (1768), TEM15 (-016), TEP60 (-1195), TEP80 (-0001), TE3 (-7376), TE7 (-096), TEP10 (082), CzME2 (-508), CzS2 (-039) and CzS4 (-023)

=== Electric locomotives ===
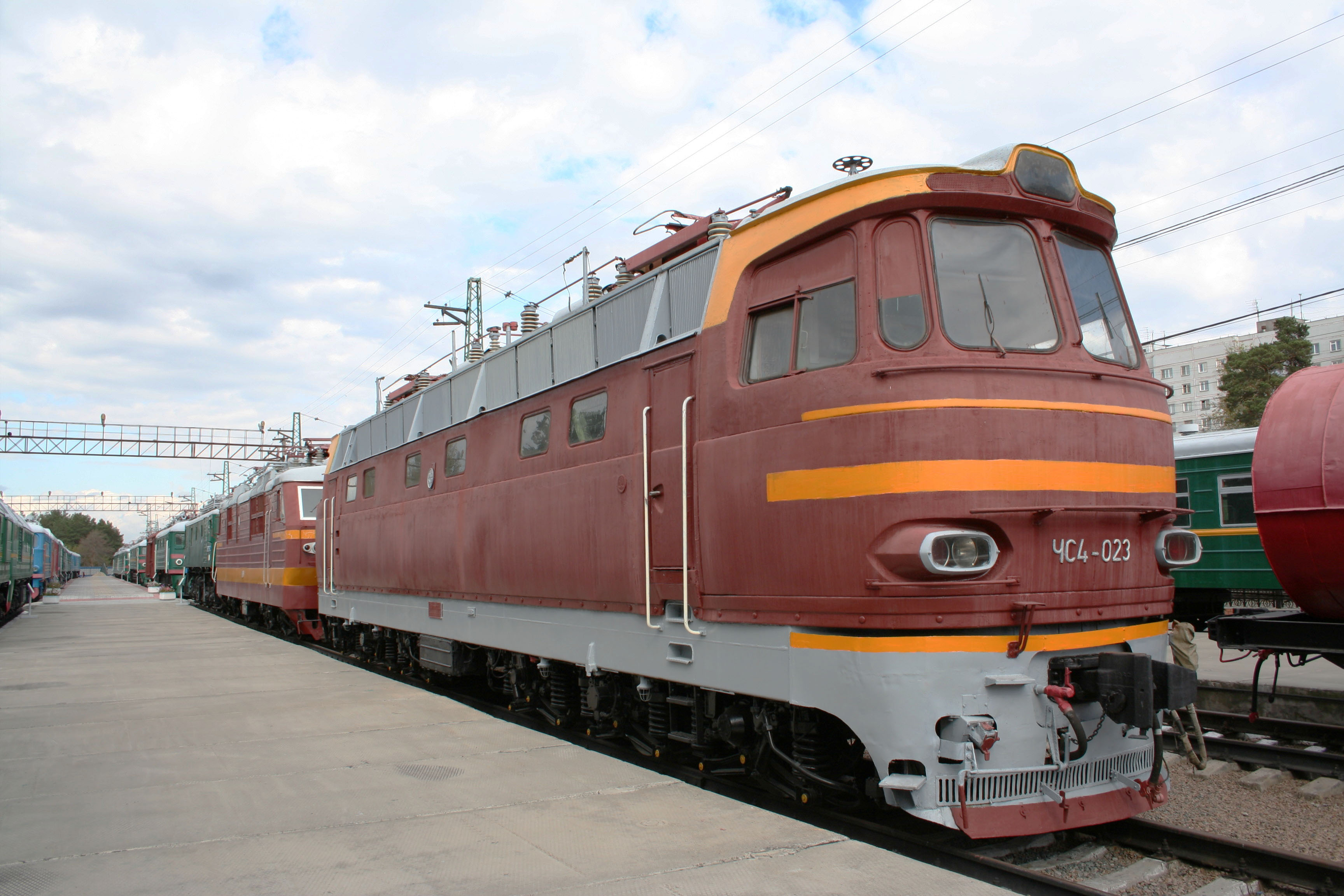
Electric locomotive ЧС4-023

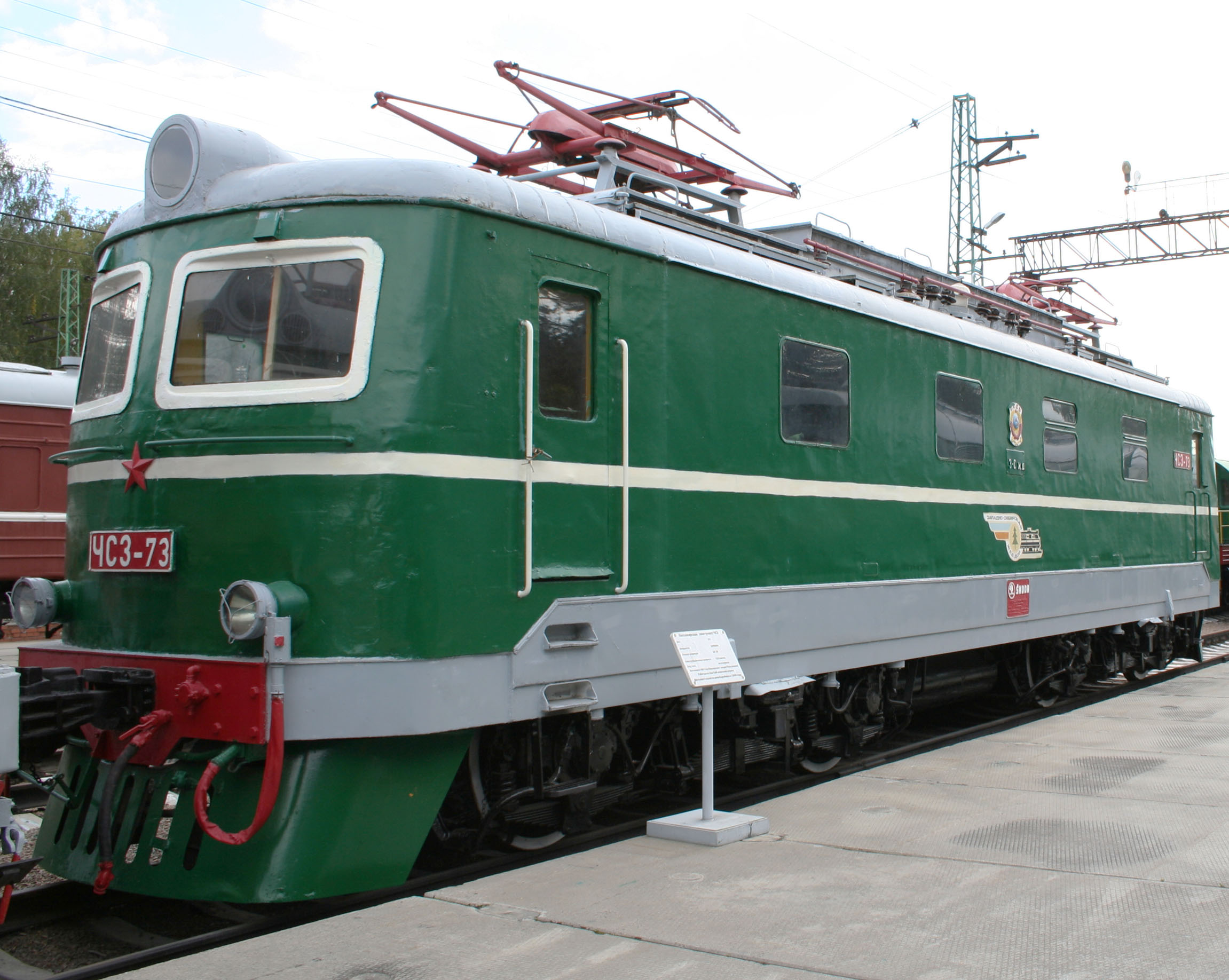
Electric locomotive ЧС3-73

Electric locomotives WL22m (N 1932), WL23 (501), WL80c (005), WL80c (1066-2), WL8 (-1232), WL10 (271) and WL60k (-649)

=== Carriages ===
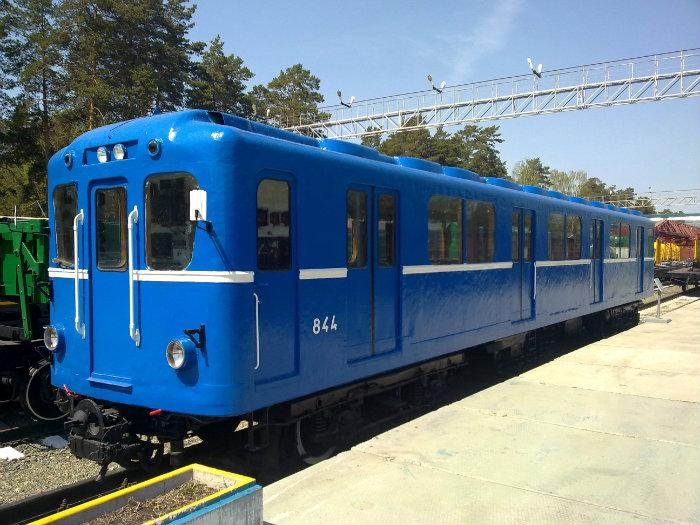
Metro Train D-844

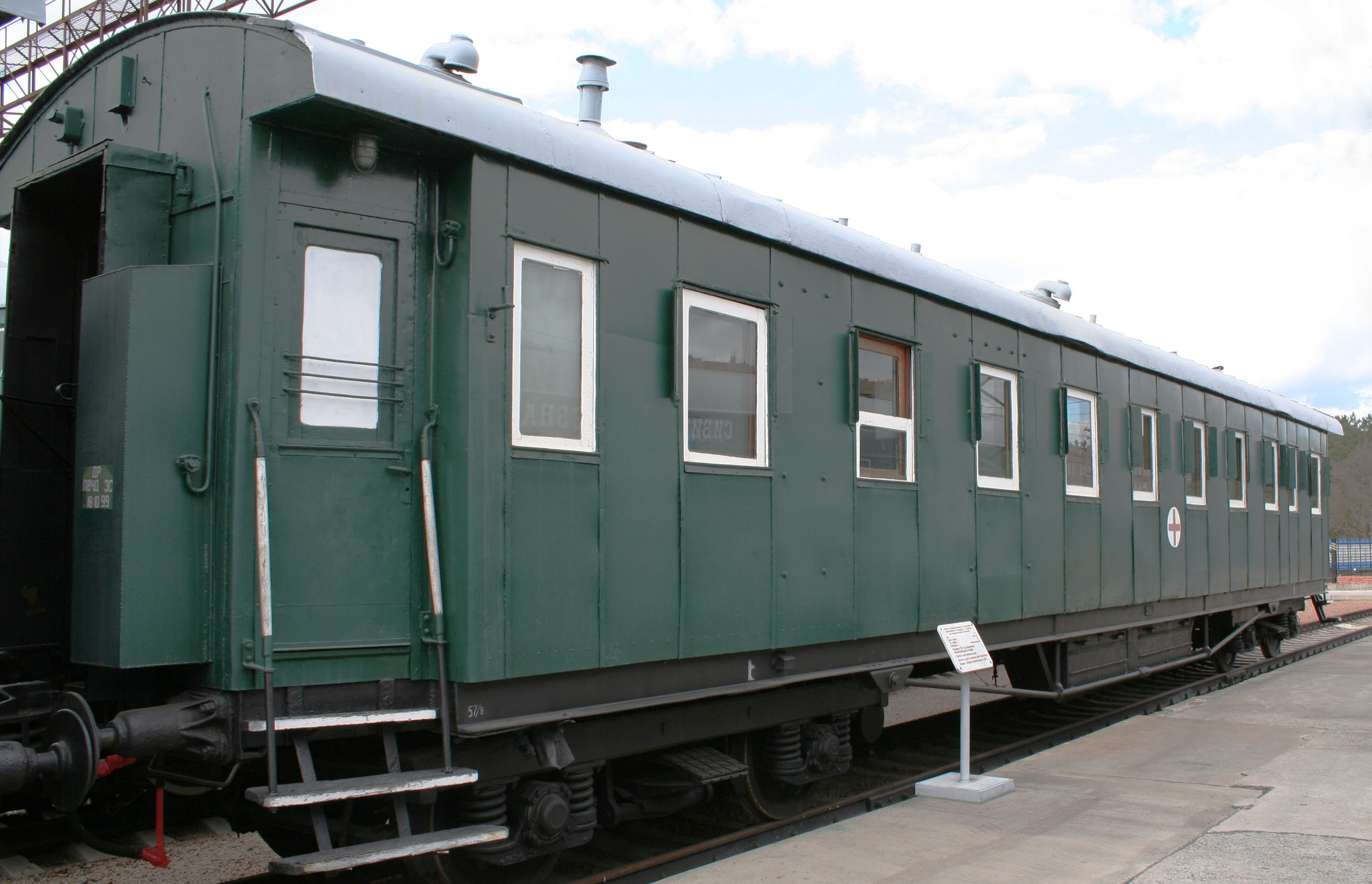
Passenger carriage of 1937

Leon Trotsky's private carriage, hospital carriages, luggage carriages, prison carriages, tank cars including those for spirits, cooling cars, garbage cars, grain cars, cars for transporting liquid metal, fire engines and snow plows.
