= Russian locomotive class Ye =

Class of 2-10-0 locomotives

Russian class Е [Ye]
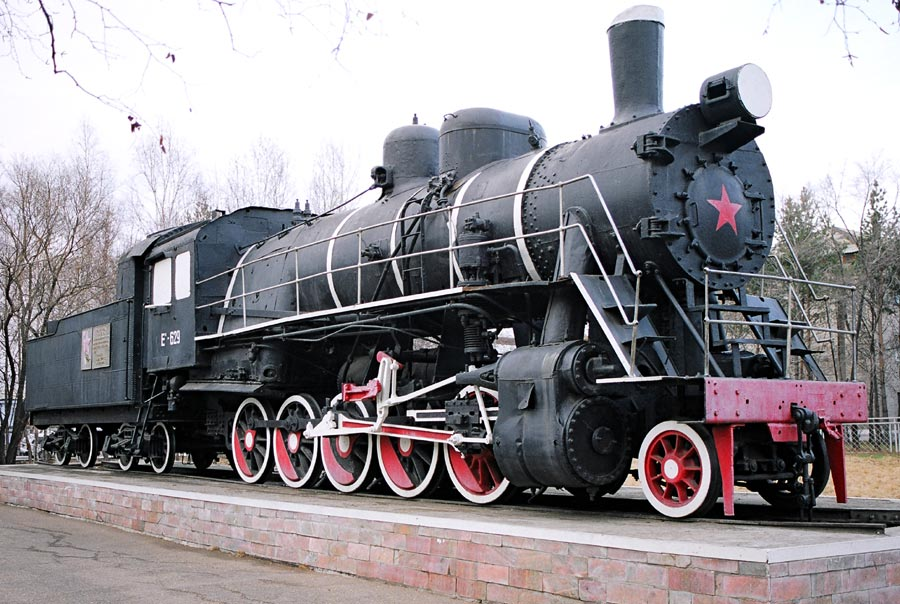
- Еа-629 (Ел-629) as a monument in Ussuriysk (Primorsky Krai)
Type and origin
- Power type: Steam
- Builder: Baldwin Locomotive Works; American Locomotive Company; Canadian Locomotive Company
- Model: 12-44 F
- Build date: 1915–1918, 1943–1947
- Total produced: 3,193+
Specifications
- Configuration
  - Whyte: 2-10-0
  - UIC: 1′E h2
- Gauge: 5 ft (1,524 mm); Those remaining in US or going to China Railway, converted to 4 ft 8 1/2 in (1,435 mm) standard gauge
- Driver dia.: 52 in (1,321 mm)
- Length: 72 ft 9 in (22.17 m)
- Adhesive weight: 180,200 lb (81,700 kg)
- Loco weight: 207,700 lb (94,200 kg)
- Total weight: 342,500 lb (155,400 kg)
- Fuel type: Coal
- Fuel capacity: 40,000 lb (18,100 kg)
- Water cap.: 7,000 US gal (26,000 L; 5,800 imp gal)
- Firebox
  - Grate area: 64.7 sq ft (6.01 m^{2})
- Boiler pressure: 180 psi (1.24 MPa)
- Heating surface: 2,594 sq ft (241.0 m^{2})
- Superheater
  - Heating area: 569 sq ft (52.9 m^{2})
- Cylinders: Two, outside
- Cylinder size: 25 in × 28 in (635 mm × 711 mm)
- Valve gear: Walschaerts
Performance figures
- Maximum speed: 55 mph (89 km/h)
- Tractive effort: 51,500 lbf (229.08 kN)
Career
- Operators: Imperial Russian Government; Finnish State Railways; Various American railways.
- Preserved: 39
- Disposition: 39 preserved

The Russian locomotive class Ye, and subclasses Ye^{a}, Ye^{k}, Ye^{l}, Ye^{f}, Ye^{m}, Ye^{mv} and Ye^{s} (Russian: Паровоз Е; Е^{а}, Е^{к}, Е^{л}, Е^{ф}, Е^{м}, Е^{мв} and Е^{с}) were a series of 2-10-0 "Decapod" type steam locomotives built by American builders for the Russian railways in World War I and again in World War II. They were lightweight engines with relatively low axle loadings.

Due to the Bolshevik revolution in 1917, 200 locomotives were stranded in the United States so these were fitted with wider tires: locomotive driving wheels had steel tires which were heated to expand them, then driven over the wheels so that they shrank into place. By fitting wider tires with a deeper tread width, the effective wheel gauge could be decreased from the Russian standard of 5 ft (1,524 mm) to 4 ft 8 1/2 in (1,435 mm) (the US standard) to fit the American gauge, and could then be sent to various railroads. The locomotives were nicknamed "Russian Decapods."

A number of locomotives were acquired by the Finnish railways (class Tr2) and by the China Railway (class DK2).

== World War I ==
=== Background ===
When Russia entered the war in 1914, it was dependent mainly on 0-8-0 and 2-8-0 locomotives. What was needed were locomotives with high adhesive weight (and thus tractive effort), which could only be provided by a locomotive with 10 drive wheels, but the only model being built, the class E (Russian: Паровоз Э) 0-10-0, was in short supply, with only 100 produced to that point. Another problem was that the 0-10-0's were being produced only at one factory. At this time, Professor N. L. Shchukin, head of the commission of rolling stock, the Ministry of Railways, proposed ordering 400 2-10-0 locomotives from the United States.

=== Design ===
Although the production was to be American, the locomotive was designed by Russian engineers. This called for 10 drive wheels, a low axle loading, a large firebox to burn low-grade coal, and an overall similar design to the Э class 0-10-0. Because the weight of the boiler, particularly the firebox, caused the axle load on some axles to exceed 16 tonnes, it was decided to add a lead pony truck, thus turning it into a 2-10-0. This also allowed a slightly bigger boiler whilst keeping the axle loadings within acceptable limits.

Some people, including Shchukin, would have rather ordered a 2-10-2 locomotive, but the decision was made to keep it as a 2-10-0, as its shorter length would allow it to fit on smaller turntables. Another reason was that the small drive wheels allowed a wide firebox above the wheels to be nearly as deep as a locomotive with a trailing axle.

The cylinders were originally planned to be 630 mm stroke by 700 mm bore, but because America uses inches, the designers changed it to 635 mm (25.0 in) stroke by 711.2 mm (28.00 in) bore. It was originally planned to use plate frames, but since that would take time away from production in setting up the equipment in American factories, it was decided to use bar frames.

At the same time, Russian designers were also planning for a tandem compound 2-10-0 and 0-10-0, and an ordinary 0-10-2 and 0-12-0 to be produced at home, but the orders were never implemented due to the factories being at the limit of their capacities.

Diagrams showing the basic dimensions of four models, with dimensions in millimetres.

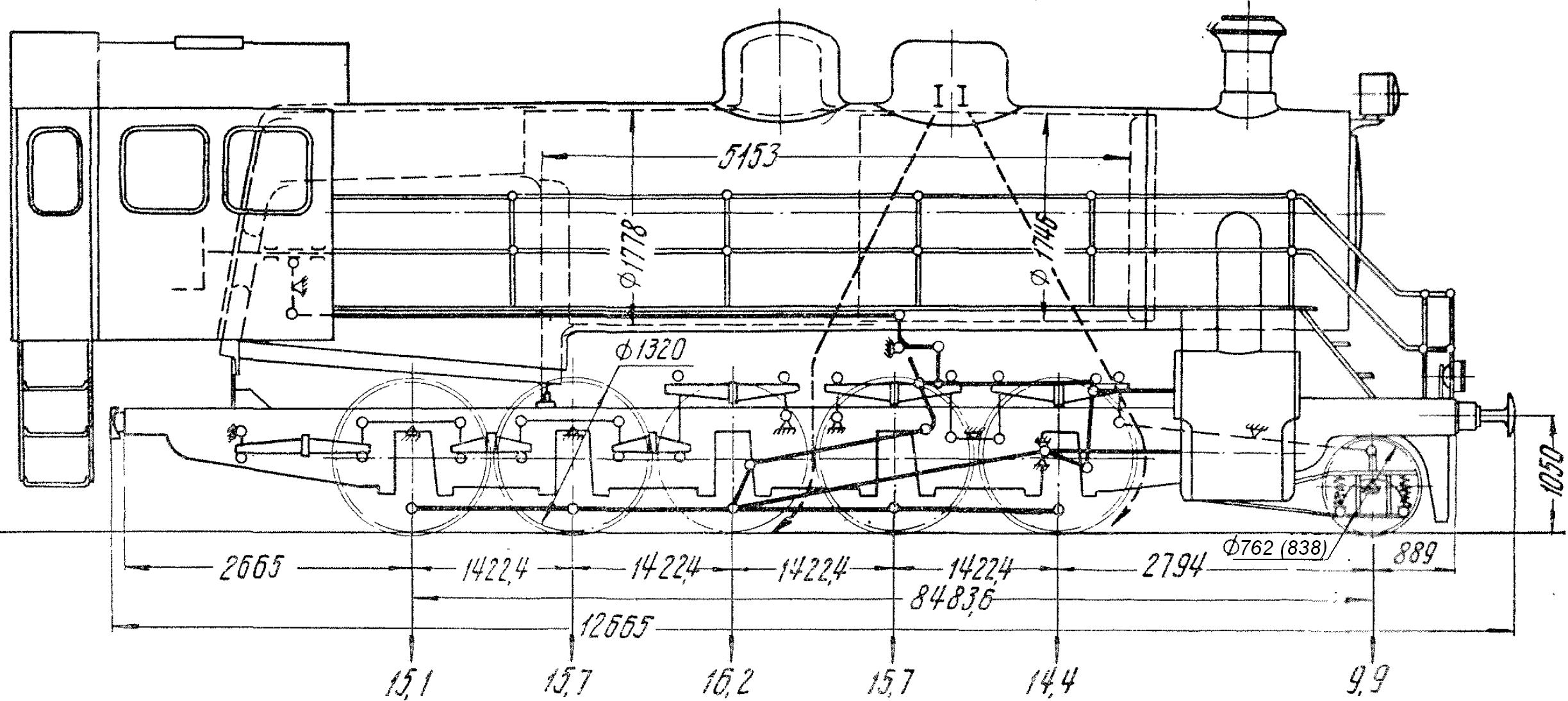
Еф, Ек, and Ес

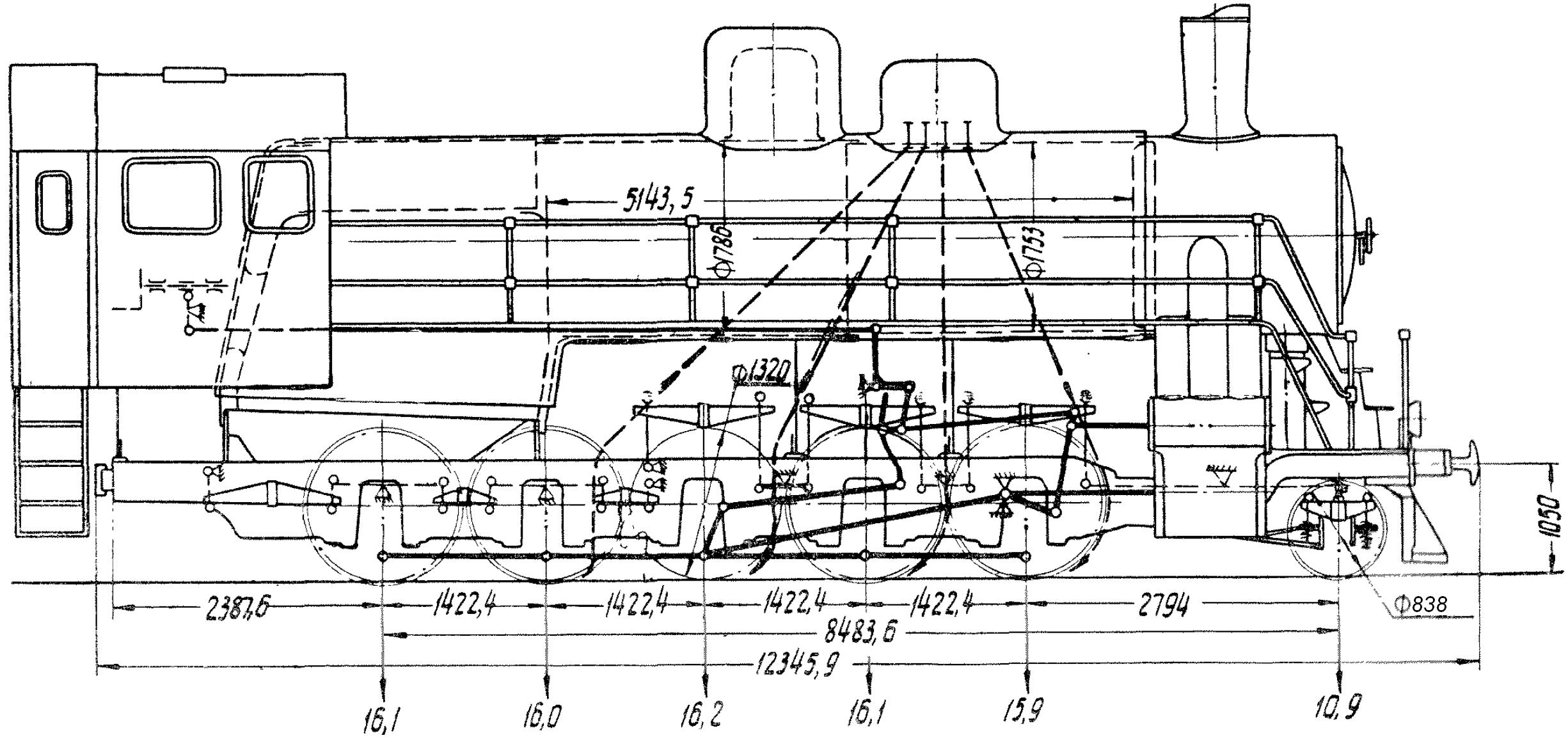
Ел

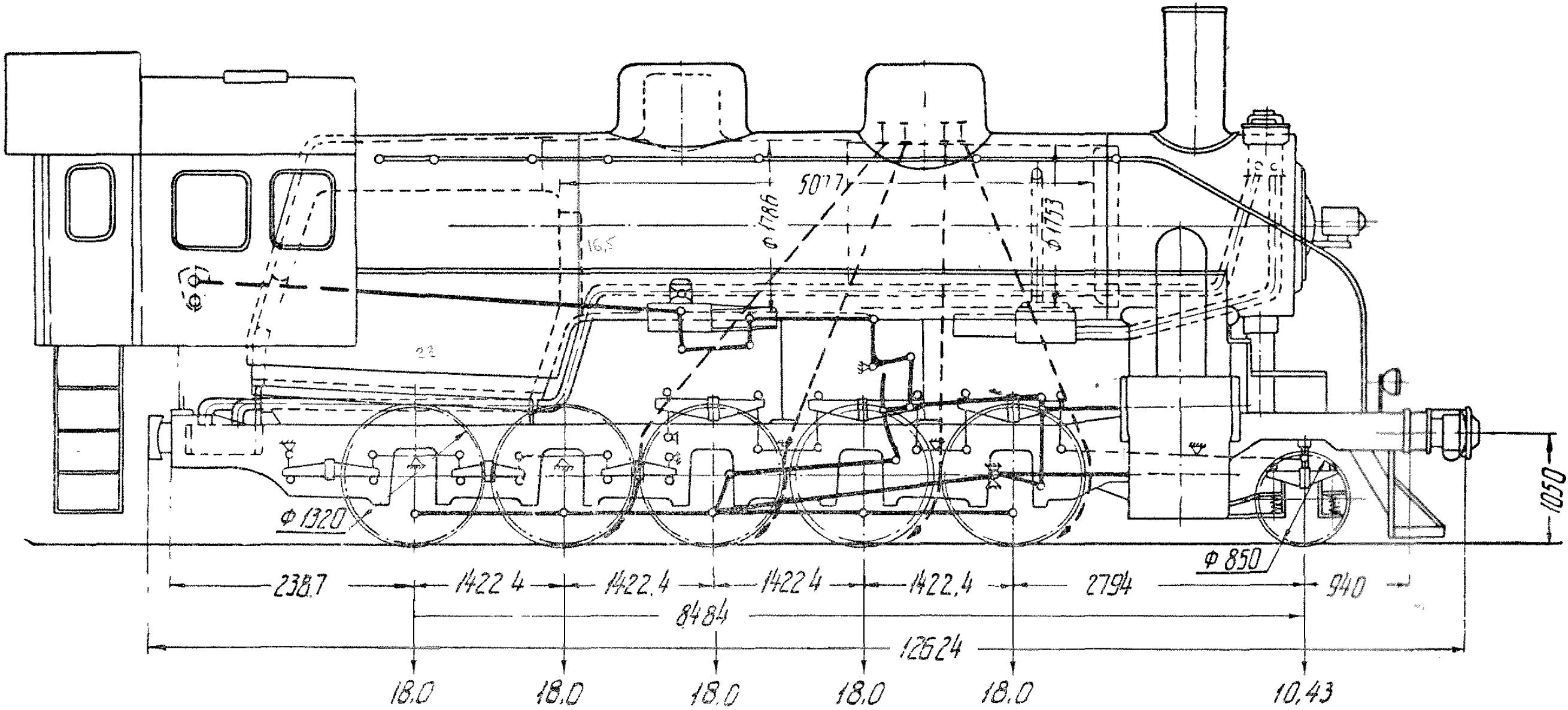
Еа

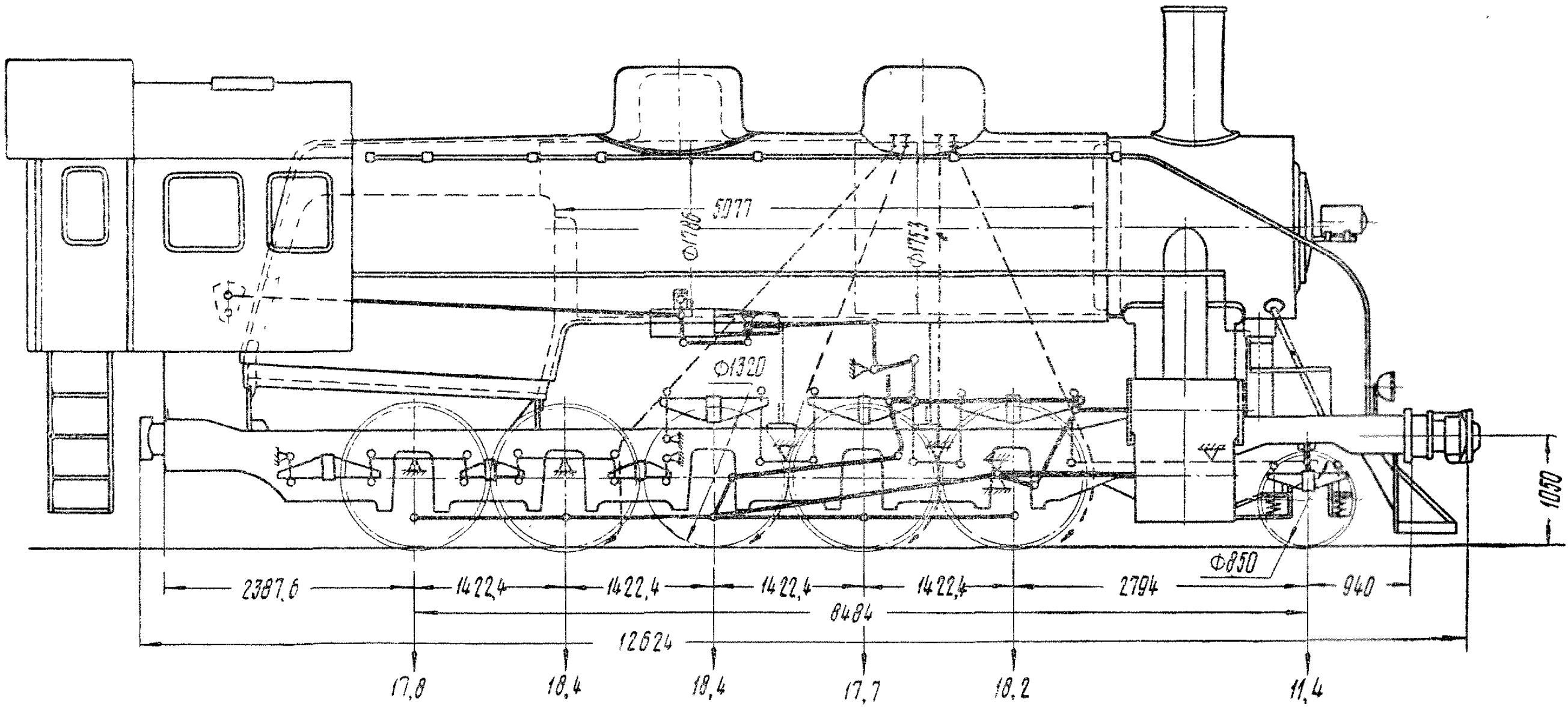
Ем and Емв

=== The first order ===
In 1915, the first 400 locomotives entered production. In Russia, they were given the name of class "Е," with subclasses varying on the city of the manufacturer: Еф for Baldwin built (ф=ph for Philadelphia, Pennsylvania), Ес for Alco built (с=s for Schenectady, New York), and Ек for Canadian built (к=k for Kingston, Ontario).

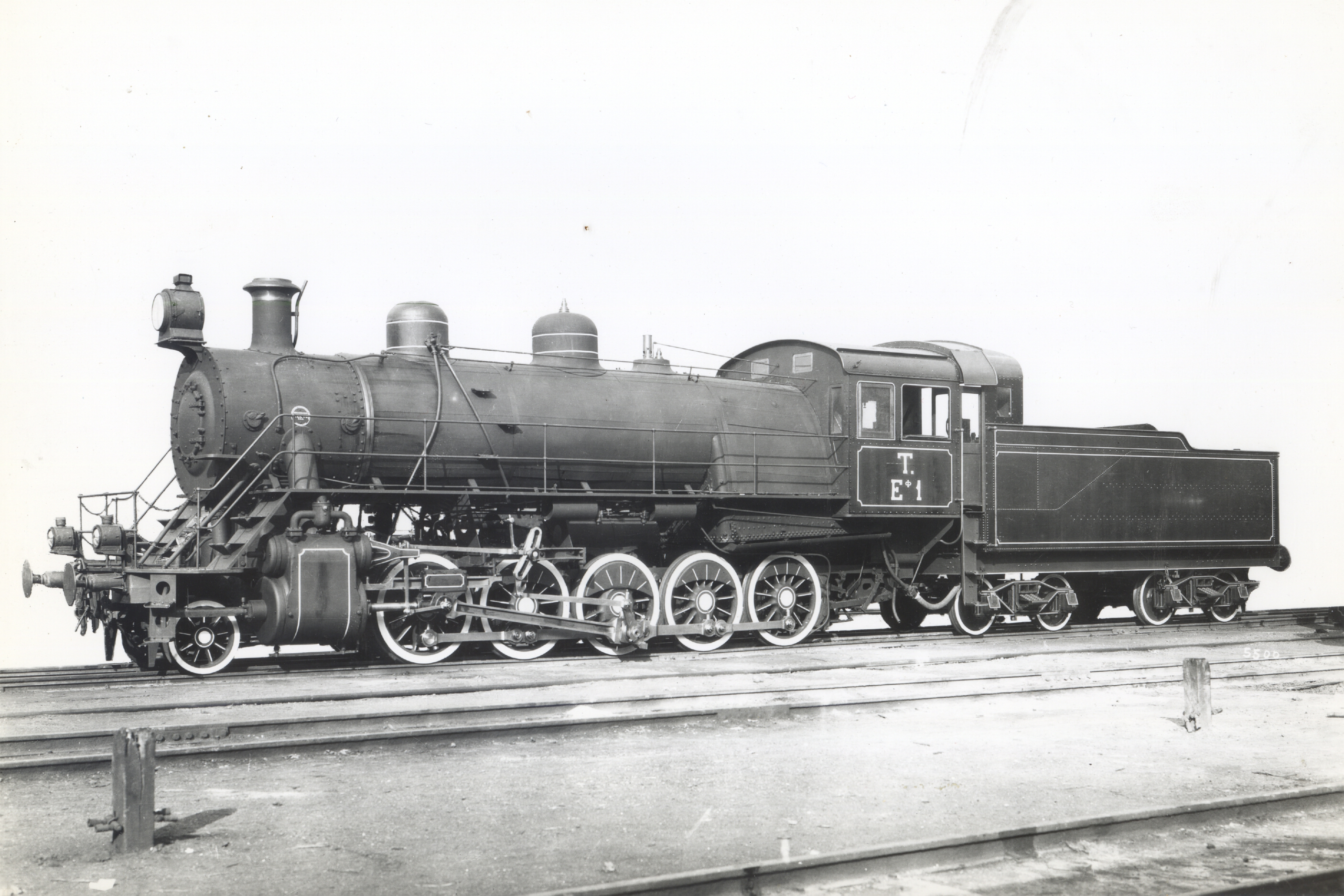
Locomotive Е^{ф}-1 at the Baldwin factory, before shipment.

The locomotives were manufactured without brakes. This is due to the fact that it was determined to equip these locomotives with Westinghouse brakes, but this did not comply with the requirements of Russian railways. Therefore, the braking equipment was commissioned by the joint stock company of Westinghouse in Petrograd. For this reason, upon arriving in Vladivostok, locomotives were first sent to the main workshops of the Chinese Eastern Railway in Harbin. There, the locomotives were equipped with brakes and prepared to be sent to the railways of the European part of Russia.

=== Second and third orders, and stranded locomotives ===
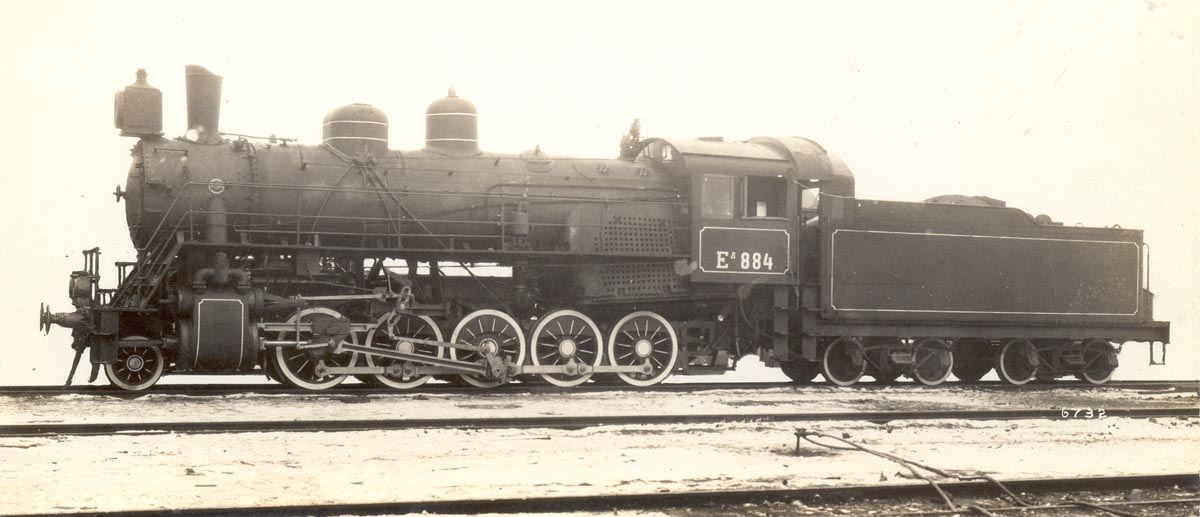
Locomotive Е^{л}-884 at the Baldwin factory, before shipment.

In 1916, after satisfactory performance of the first engines, Russia decided to order a further 475 locomotives, with minor changes. These were sub-classed as Ел. These locomotives were slightly heavier, with an adhesive weight of 80.3 tonnes

In 1917, Russia again decided to order more locomotives. Baldwin was only able to supply 75 at this time. However, when the United States entered the war in 1917, it decided to aid the Allied effort by producing more 2-10-0s for Russia. About 500 locomotives were ordered. However, production was interrupted by the 1917 Bolshevik revolution, and ultimately only 50 locomotives were delivered. This left 200 locomotives stranded in the US. At this point, the United States Railroad Administration decided to convert them to standard gauge by fitting wider tires, and then distribute them among American railways. The Erie Railroad received 75, the Seaboard Air Line Railroad received 40, the St. Louis – San Francisco Railway (SLSF) received 20 (17 directly from the government, 3 from other companies), and 22 other railways received lesser quantities. The unbuilt remainder of the order, 200 locomotives, was canceled.

== World War II ==
=== Background ===
After two years of war with Germany, much of the Soviet rail system was in ruins. At the time, much effort had been put into rebuilding the track; however, the hasty nature of the construction meant that it could not support locomotives with axle-loadings of more than 18 tonnes. Around 16,000 engines were destroyed by the various bombings, and the remaining intact engines were either too weak or too heavy. The factories did not have the equipment to produce locomotives, so it was decided to order more from America.

=== Design ===
To significantly reduce the amount of work on designing a new engine and speed up the order, it was decided to base the project on the design of the Ел engine. To reduce costs and accelerate production of steam cylinders, brass bushings were used, and the cast iron dome was pressed, and the firebox was now welded. Because of the possibility of the motion locking up, Zyablova valves were replaced with valves of the Celler type. These valves allowed saturated steam directly into the cylinders while preventing combustion gases from the firebox to enter. The number of tubes for the super heater elements was increased from 28 to 35, raising the superheater area to 76.2 m^{2} (820 sq ft). The evaporative heating surface of the boiler was therefore decreased to 229.2 m^{2} (2,467 sq ft) (with the number of boiler tubes reduced to 162). Due to the increase in weight the engine, and the possible damage in transit across the ocean, the thickness of the frame's sidewalls was increased from 114.3 to 127 mm (4.5 to 5.0 in). For supplying coal to the firebox, tenders were equipped with an HT-1 automatic stoker. In addition, there were a few minor improvements. Otherwise, the locomotives were unchanged.

=== Subclasses Еа, Ем, and Емв ===
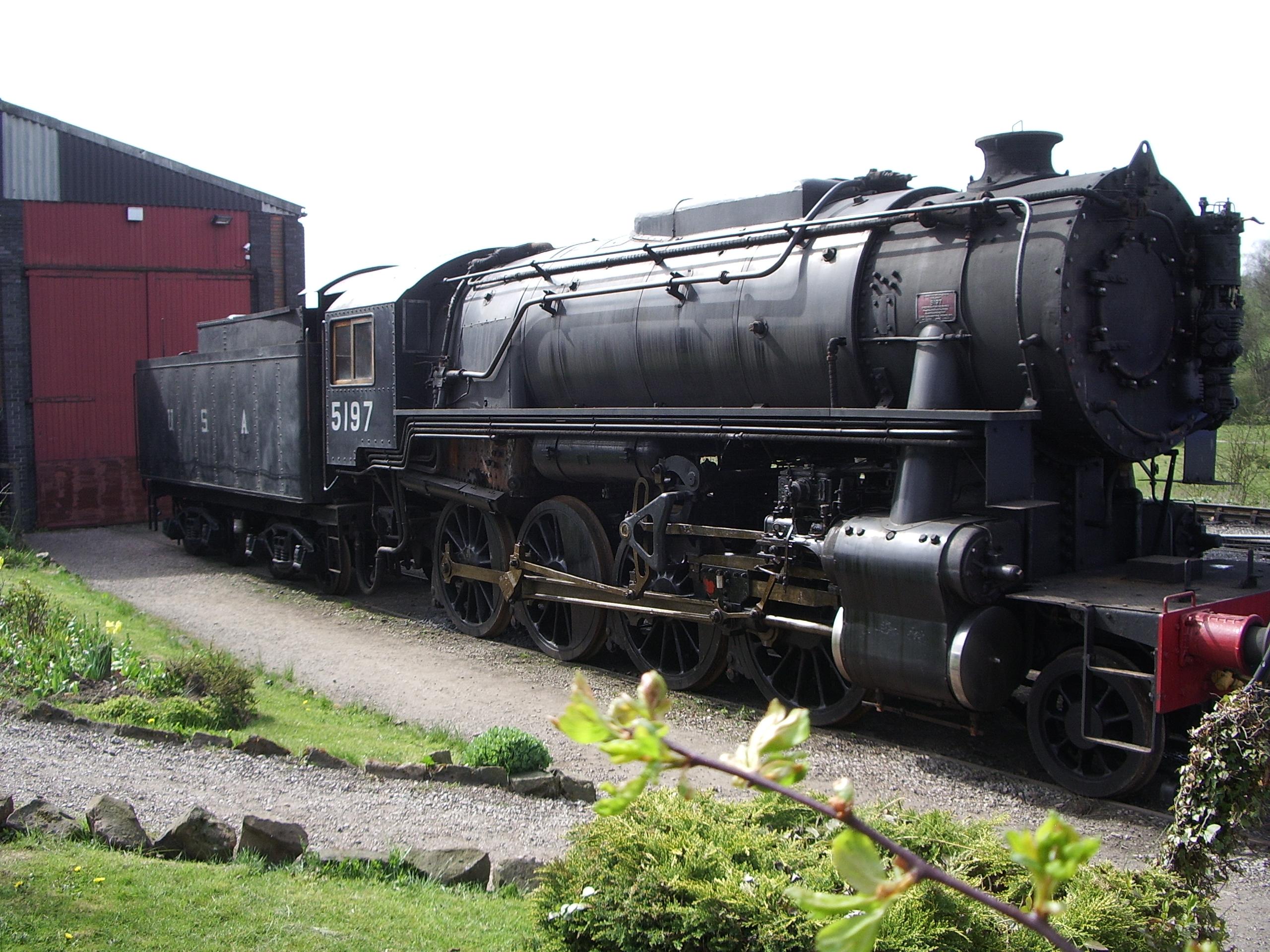
An S160 locomotive.

At the conclusion of the third protocol of Lend-Lease in the summer of 1943 (effective from 1 July of that year), the American factories ALCO and Baldwin were given an order for production of more 2-10-0 locomotives based on the Soviet designers' drawings. As the factories were not ready to start manufacturing these engines until the end of the year, due to the high demand for steam locomotives, the Soviet Union was forced to order 150 (later increased to 200) 2-8-0 S160 series locomotives (Soviet designation Series Ша). It is noteworthy that these engines, built between the world wars, were based on the Ел locomotives, having similar features such as the high location of the boiler.

In 1944 the first steam engines of the Е series, which was given index "a" (for 'American'), resulting in the designation of Еа. The numbers of locomotives built by ALCO began at #2001 and the Baldwin built locomotives at #2201. In September the same year, the first Baldwin built locomotive (Еа-2201) was sent to the pilot ring VNIIZhT which was tested until October. In the course of the tests, it was found that forcing the boiler to 70 kg/m^{2} (0.00069 MPa; 0.100 psi), a cutoff of 60% and at a speed of 19.6 mph (31.5 km/h), the engine could develop 36,080 lbf (160.5 kN) of tractive effort. It was also found that the locomotive could achieve 1,920–1,950 hp (1,430–1,450 kW), which was a 20–25% increase compared to the World War I engines (1,400 hp or 1,000 kW). The improved performance was achieved through improved boiler and the use of mechanical stoker. The temperature of superheated steam was typically 572–644 °F (300–340 °C), and no more than 698 °F (370 °C).

In 1945 the factories began producing steam engines of this new design, which received the designation of Ем (modernized).

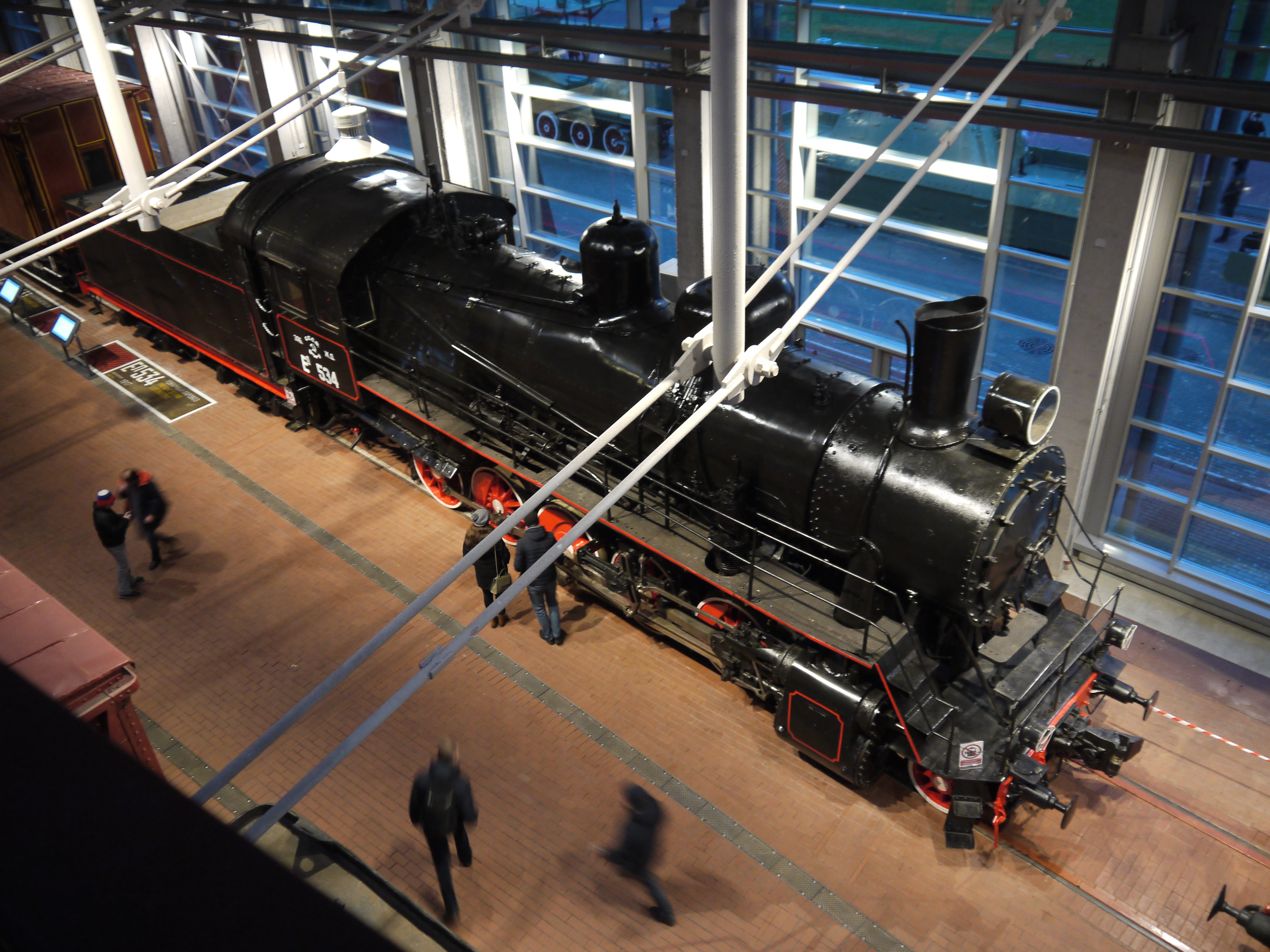
Yel 534 at the Russian Railway Museum, St. Petersburg

Although the locomotives were designed and built according to Soviet designs, the American plants implemented some of their own technologies, as well as changes in design of individual units. Thus, the plant Baldwin locomotives #2624 to Alco #2200 were issued with rocking grates. Most of the Еа and Ем locomotives were issued with bar frames, but some were released with cast frames, which included not only a sidewall with better fixtures, but cylinders integrated with the support for the boiler, the buffer timber with support for the truck, smaller tender coupling, brackets for balancing the spring suspension and brake support shaft. Also, the last thirteen locomotives built by ALCO, issued in 1947, were equipped with feedwater heaters. These 13 locomotives were given the designation Емв. In 1946, at the Yaroslavl locomotive plant, two locomotives were weighed: one was an Еа with bar frames, and the other was an Ем with a cast frame. It was found that the engine Е-2001, Е-2988 and Ем-3892 have common operating weights which were, respectively, 102.8, 99.6, and 103.5 tonnes, and the adhesion weight was 91.2, 88.7 and 91.5 tonnes.

The last steam locomotive was Ем #4260 (Some sources say #4250), built by Baldwin for Soviet railways, and delivered on August 27, 1945, and that was when Baldwin stopped producing locomotives for the Soviets, followed by Alco in 1947. Overall, no less than 2,047 Russian decapods were built for the Soviet Union between 1944 and 1947. However, the recorded numbers of the locomotives built and delivered varies between US and Soviet sources. Thus, according to Vitaly Rakov, only 2,047 locomotives were built, of which 1,622 were of class Е, 412 were of class Ем, and 13 were of class Емв. Ем locomotives #3621-3634 were not delivered. Peter Klaus pointed out that the USSR did not make engines with serial numbers USATC #4878 (Е-2378), 5908, 5938, 5940–5942, 6734, and 10060–10086, and according to R. Tourett, 47 of the 2110 steam locomotives built were not sent to the USSR.

== Post-War Tr2 Finland ==
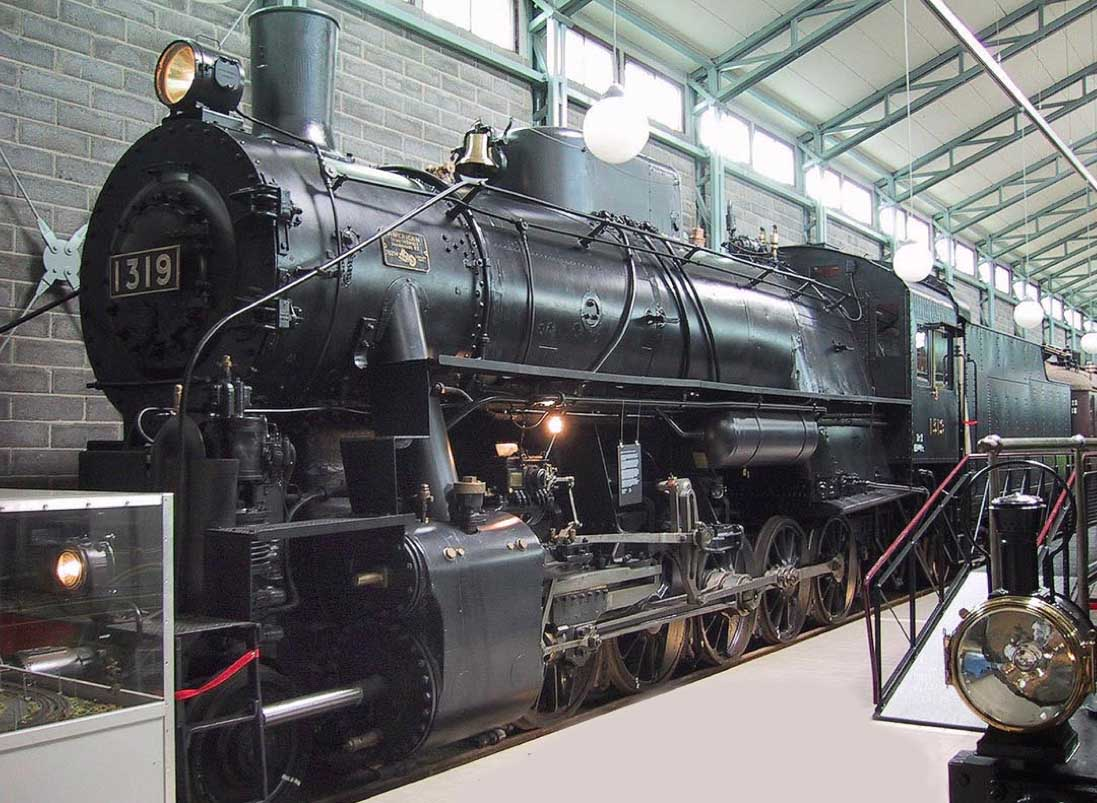
ALCO No. 75214 Tr2 Truman 1319 at the Finnish Railway Museum

The State Railroads of Finland purchased 20 American Decapods after World War II - these were originally built for the Soviet Union, but never delivered to them. Of the 20 engines, 10 were manufactured by Baldwin, 10 by Alco. Since they were originally built for the USSR, they had the correct gauge for Finland, too (1,524 mm (5 ft) exactly). One (Alco # 75214, 1947) is preserved at the Finnish Railway Museum in Hyvinkää, Finland.

The locomotives had the Finnish designation Tr2 (Tavarajuna, Raskas - freight train, Heavy) and were nicknamed Truman locomotives after US President Harry S. Truman, as they were acquired during the Truman administration. They were delivered in 1946 and phased out in 1968 as diesel and electricity superseded steam on Finnish railways. The Trumans were the most powerful freight train steam engines ever employed by the Finnish State Railways.

== China Railways DK2 ==
60 American Decapods in China became class DK2 in 1959, and numbered 71–130. DK2-114 is preserved at Baotou West Locomotive Depot, Hohhot Railway Bureau. This class retired at 1970s

== Korean State Railway 데가하 (Degaha) class/8100 series ==
The Soviet Union sent American Decapods to North Korea as aid starting almost immediately following the end of the Second World War, mostly of the Еа class. Originally designated 데가하 (Degaha) class by the Korean State Railway and later renumbered in the 8100 series, number 8112 was still operational in 2007.

== Surviving locomotives ==
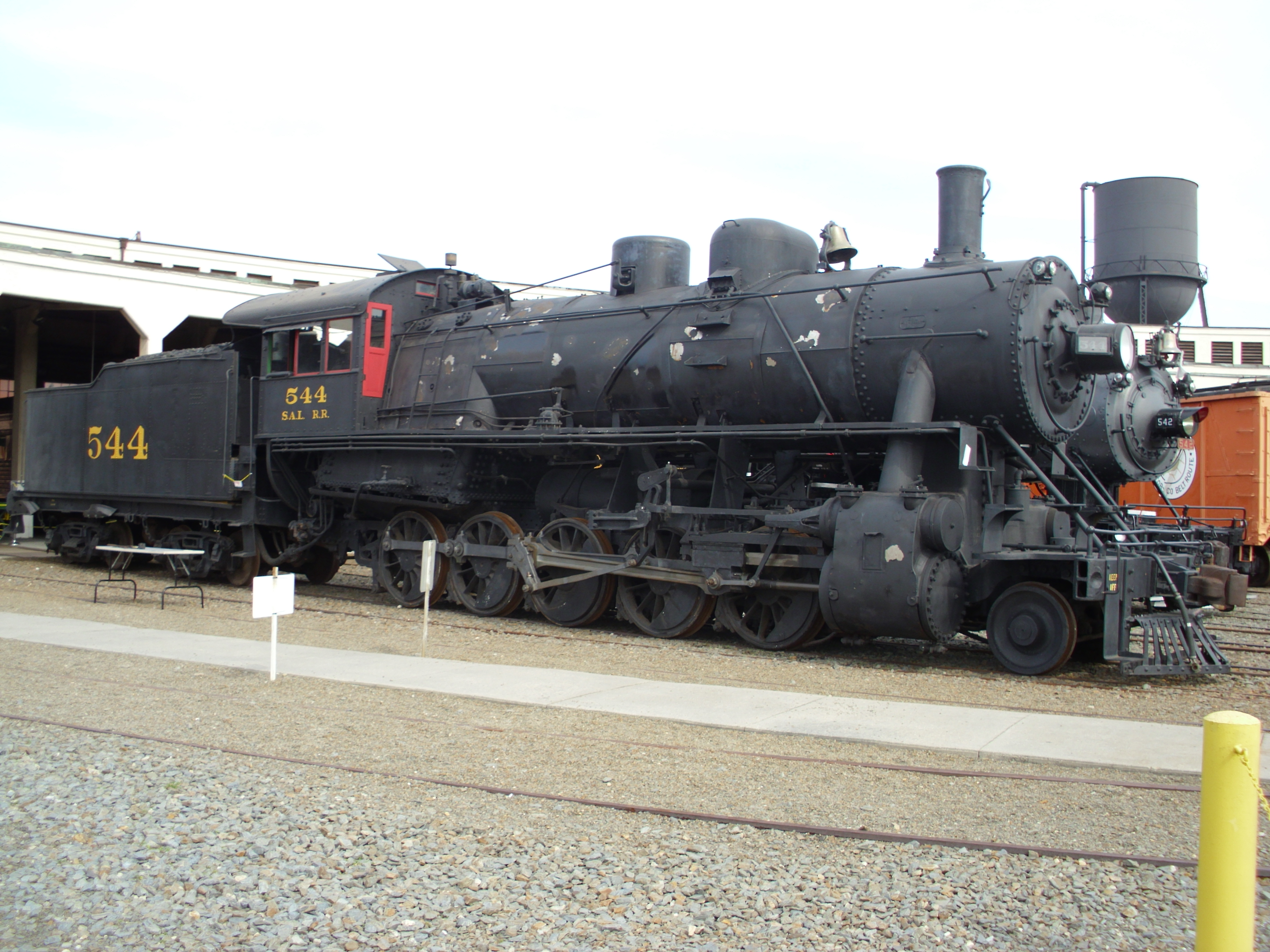
Seaboard Air Line No. 544, cosmetically restored at the North Carolina Transportation Museum

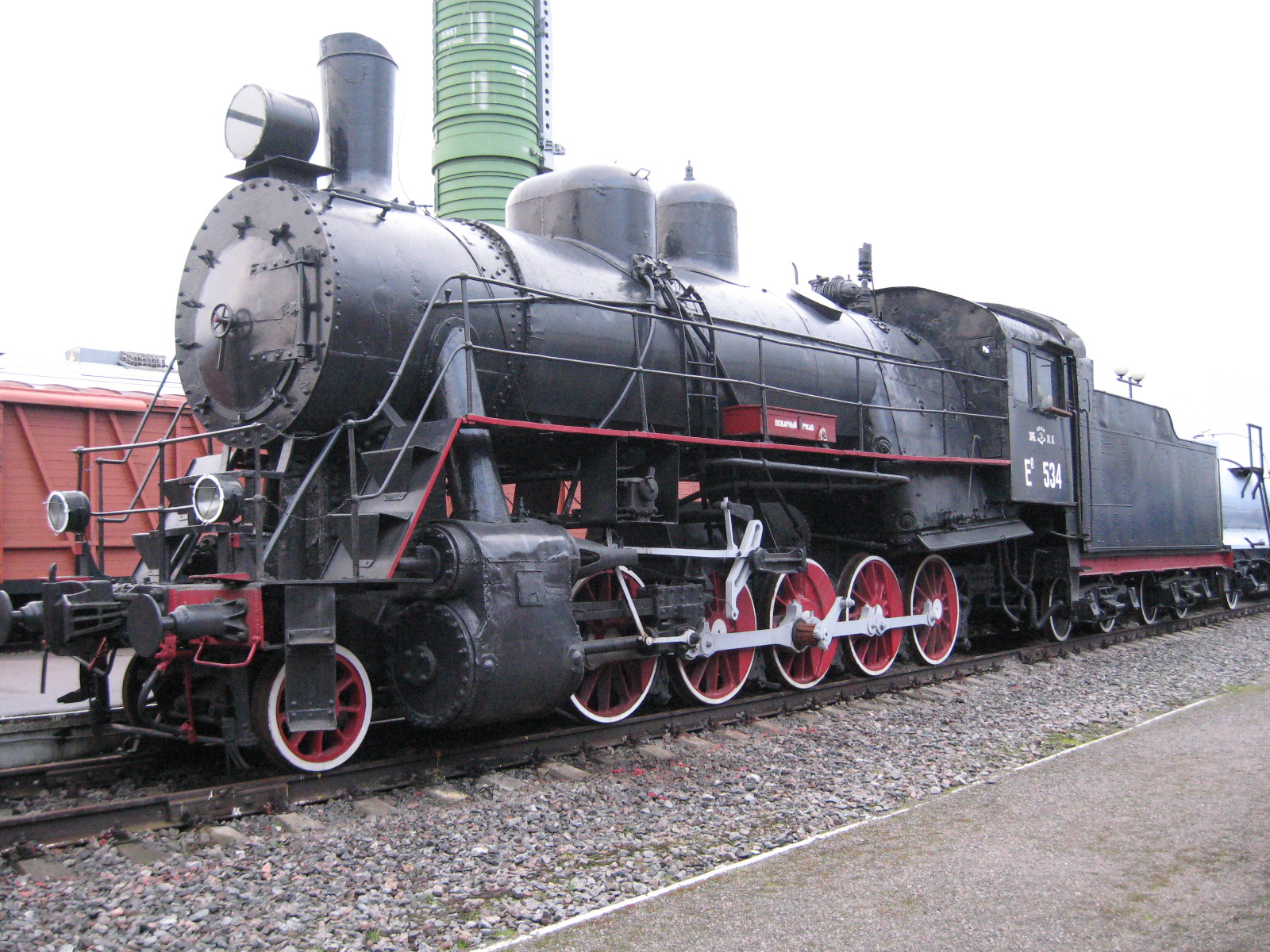
Еа-534

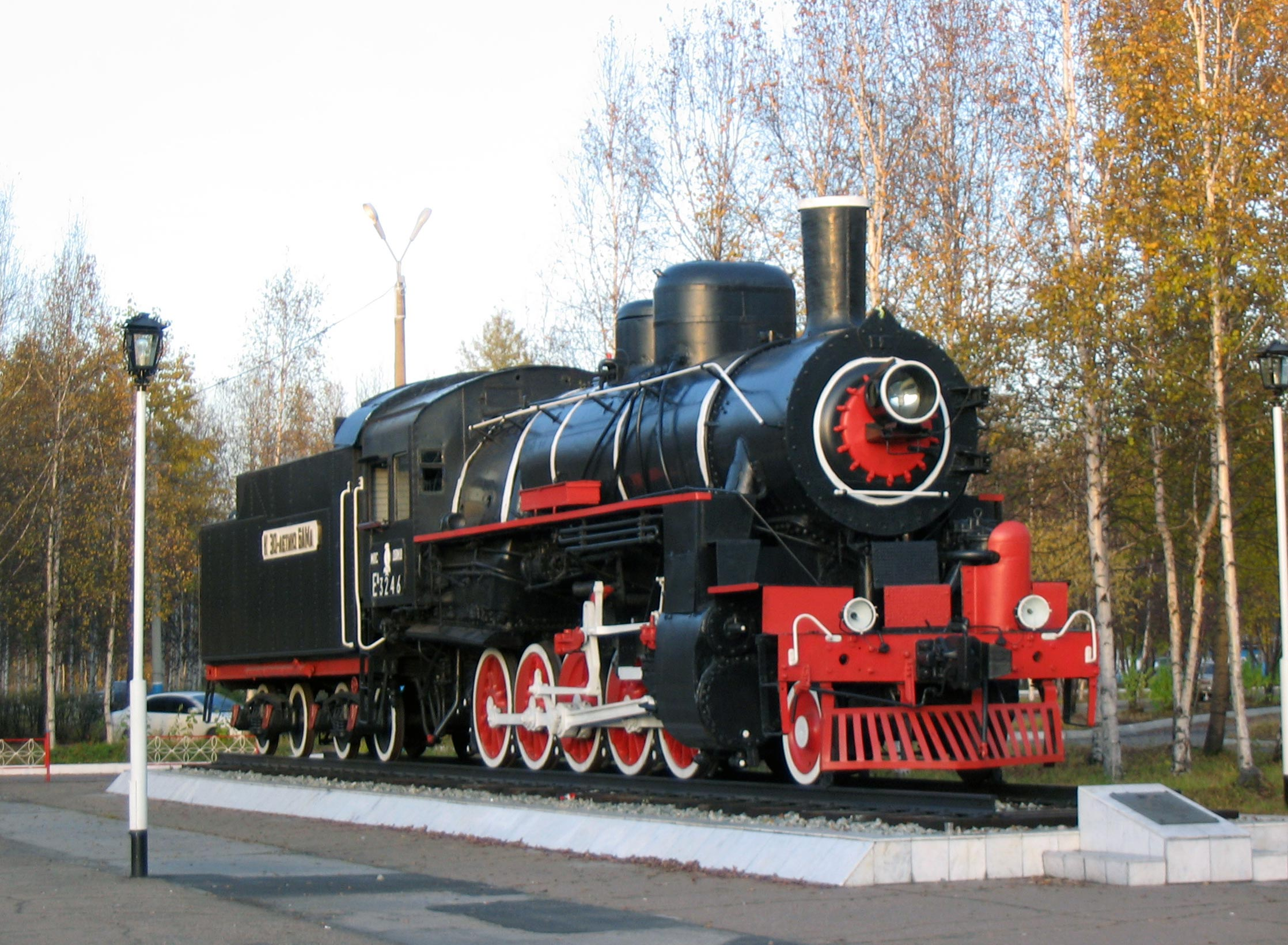
Еа-3246 near Tynda station

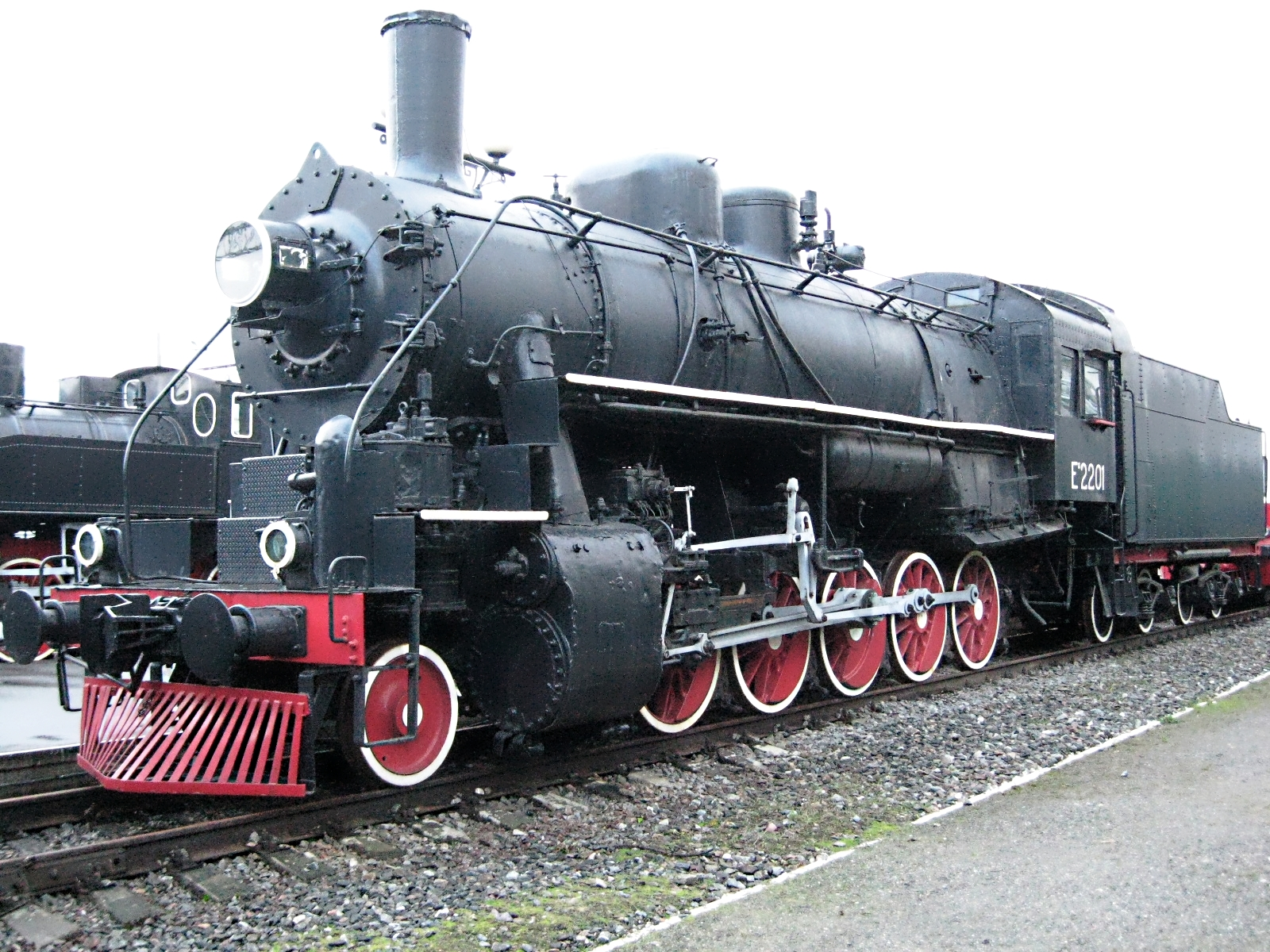
Yea 2201 built by Baldwin in 1944)

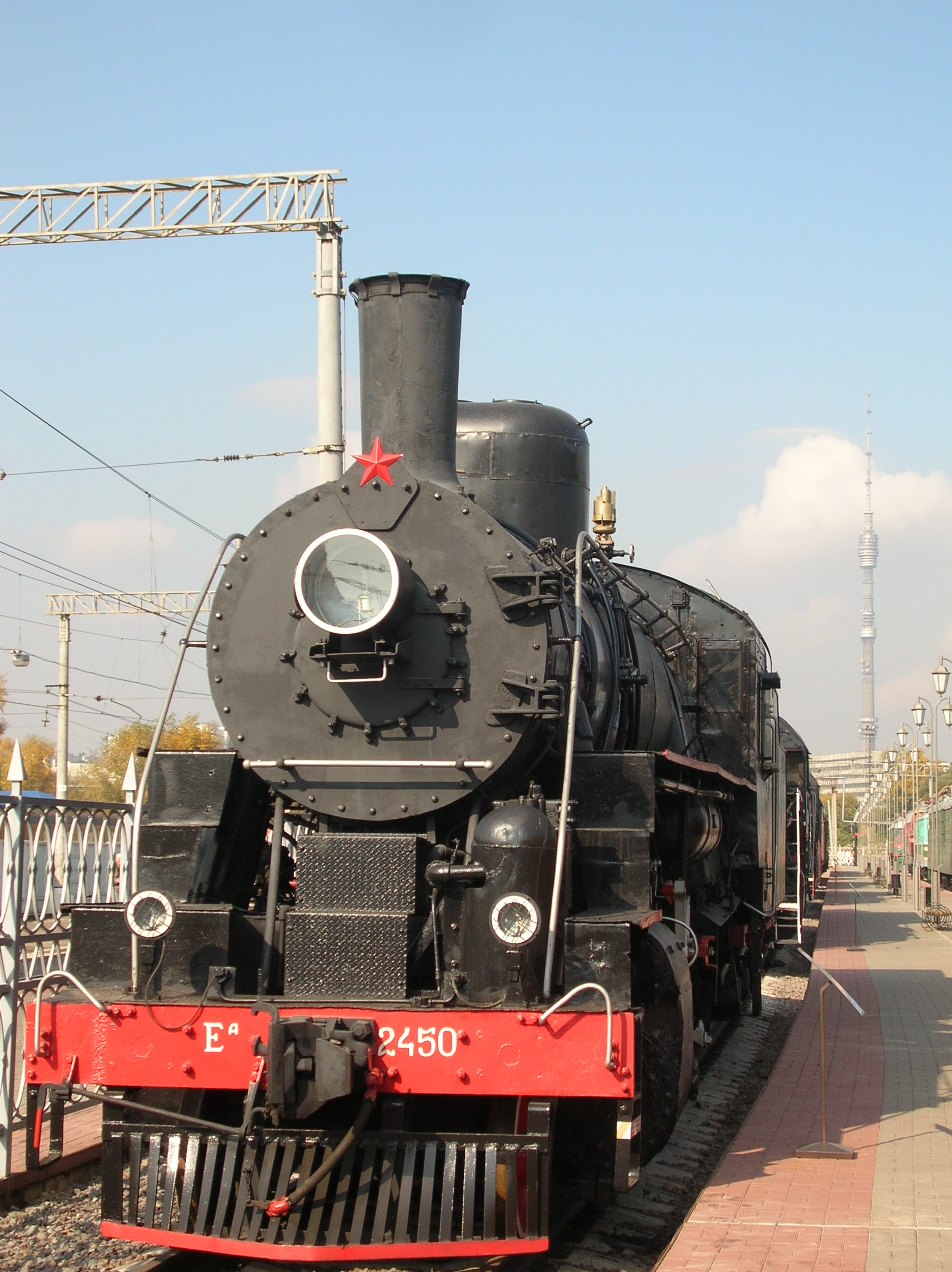
Yea-2450 at Moscow Railway Museum at Rizhsky Rail Terminal

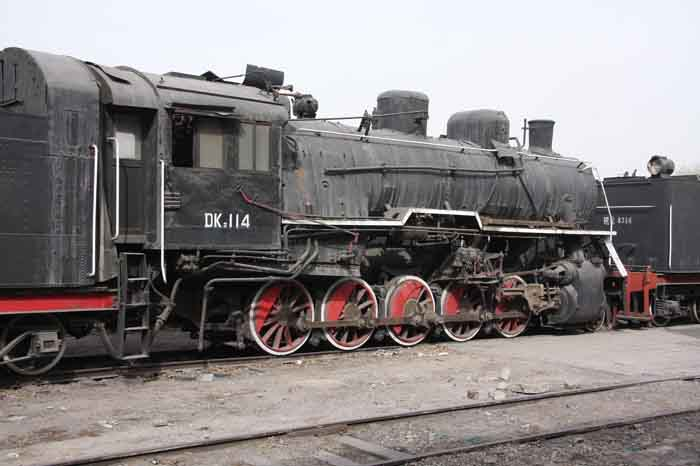
DK2-114 at Baotou West Locomotive Depot, Hohhot Railway Bureau.

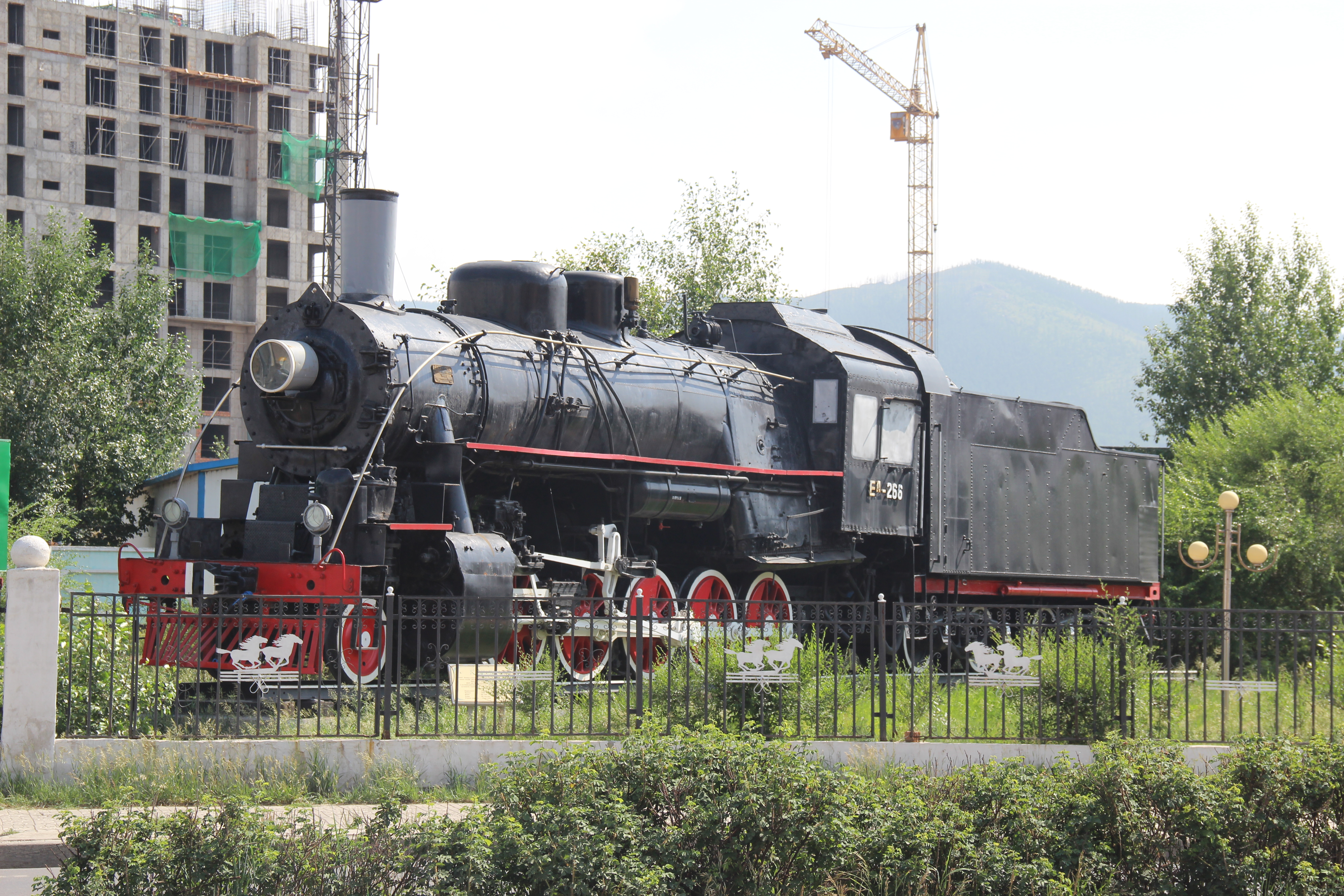
Ел-266 at Dund Goal Railroad Museum in Mongolia.
- SLSF 1615 - constructed by ALCO’s Richmond Locomotive Works in the fall of 1917 & spring of 1918; acquired by the City of Altus, Oklahoma, USA, on October 22, 1967, and placed static display there.
- SLSF 1621 - built in 1918, on static display at the National Museum of Transportation in St. Louis, Missouri, USA.
- SLSF 1625 - built in 1918 at ALCO's Schenectady Locomotive Works, on static display at the Museum of the American Railroad in Frisco, Texas, USA.
- SLSF 1630 - constructed by Baldwin in 1918, in excursion service since 1967 at the Illinois Railway Museum in Union, Illinois, USA.
- SLSF 1632 - a 1918 Baldwin located since 1991 at the Belton, Grandview and Kansas City Railroad in Belton, Missouri, USA, on static display.
- Еа-2026 - Depot Hrechany, Ukraine.
- Еа-2533 - Depot Sibirtsevo, Vladivostok.
- Еа-3215 - Sibirtsevo, Primorye.
- Ем-3747 - Tikhoretsk, Krasnodar Krai. (Restored to operation in 2018)
- Ем-3753 - Vyazemskaya, Khabarovsk Territory. (Operational as of July 2017)
- Еа-4160 - Irkutsk.
- Ел-266 - Dund Goal Railroad Museum in Ulaanbaatar, Mongolia.
- Ес-311 - Museum at Oktyabrskaya, railway station, Shushary.
- Ел-345 - Brest Railway Museum.
- Ел-534 and Еа-2201 - the Russian Railway Museum, Saint Petersburg
- SAL 544 - North Carolina Transportation Museum, USA.
- Еа-2371 - Tashkent Railway Museum.
- Еа-2441 - Technical Museum of AvtoVAZ, Togliatti.
- Еа-2450 - Moscow Railway Museum at Rizhsky Rail Terminal
- Еа-3078 - Novosibirsk Museum of railway equipment.
- Еа-3510 - Rostov Railway Museum Station Gnilovskaya.
- Ем-3635 and Ел-4000 (?) - Lebyazhye Railway Museum, Lebyazhye, Lomonosovsky District, Leningrad Oblast
- Tr2-1319 - Finnish Railway Museum in Hyvinkää.
- Ес-350 - Chelyabinsk.
- Ел-629 - Ussuriysk.
- Еа-2325 - Bishkek-I Railway Station, Kyrgyzstan
- Еа-2885 - Station Komsomolsk-sorting.
- Еа-3070 - Circum-Baikal railway.
- Еа-3220 - Station Zilov, Chita Region.
- Еа-3246 - Station Tynda, Amur region.
- Еа-3306 - Vladivostok railway terminal, as monument "To military feat of railway workers in Primorye region during WWII"
- Ем-3884 - Station Tommot, Yakutia.
- Ем-3931 - Station Vyazemskaya, Khabarovsk Territory.
- Ем-4249 - Vikhorevka, Irkutsk region.
- Ел-4729 - Nizhneudinsk, Irkutsk region.
- Еа-5052 (?) - Station Lena, Irkutsk region.
- DK2-114 - Baotou West Locomotive Depot, Hohhot Railway Bureau.
- 8112 - Operational as of 2007 at the Hwanghae Iron & Steel Complex on the Songrim Line in North Korea.

Many other locomotives of this type are still stored on various reserve bases throughout the former USSR.

== See also ==
- The Museum of the Moscow Railway
- Russian Railway Museum, Saint Petersburg
- Rizhsky Rail Terminal, Home of the Moscow Railway Museum
- History of rail transport in Russia
- Finnish Railway Museum
- List of Finnish locomotives
- List of locomotives in China
