= Sabine River and Northern Railroad =

Sabine River and Northern Railroad (reporting mark SRN) operates freight service 32 miles (51 km) from Bessmay to Echo, Texas, and over an 8-mile (13 km) branch line from Buna to Evadale. SRN has connections with Union Pacific Railroad at Echo and Mauriceville, with CPKC at Lemonville, and with BNSF Railway at Bessmay and Evadale, TX. Traffic consists of pulp and paper products.

== History ==
Sabine River & Northern EMD NC #408. As seen on display in the National Museum of Transportation in Kirkwood, Missouri.

The company was incorporated April 20, 1965, and construction was completed and service start from Echo to Mulford in April 1966. Service was extended to Mauriceville and Bessmay in August 1967. The branch to Evadale was in operation in June 1988. As of October 2023, the future of the line remains uncertain, as the primary customer, the International Paper containerboard plant north of Orange, has been slated for permanent shutdown at the end of 2023
