= Buna High School =

Coordinates: 30.4306°N 93.9578°W

Location
- 177 FM 253; Buna, Texas 77612-1087; United States

Information
- School type: Public high school
- Established: 1908
- School district: Buna Independent School District
- Principal: Shawn Clubb
- Grades: 9-12
- Enrollment: 409 (2023-2024)
- Colors: Royal Blue & White
- Athletics conference: UIL Class 3A
- Mascot: Cougar
- Yearbook: Cougar
- Website: Buna High School

Buna High School (BHS) is located in Buna, Texas and classified as a 3A school by the UIL. It is a part of the Buna Independent School District located in southern Jasper County and serves students in south Jasper County and portions of Newton County. In 2015, the school was rated "Met Standard" by the Texas Education Agency.

The boundary includes Buna and a portion of Evadale census-designated place.

== History ==
The Buna Independent School District was established in 1908. Accredited by the Texas Education Agency, the district provides a quality education for pre-kindergarten through twelfth grade. Also provided are special education programs for pre-school and school age children and a career and technology education program on the secondary level. The district serves a population of more than 8,000 with a school age population of 1,480.

== Athletics ==
The Buna Cougars compete in these sports -

Cross Country, Volleyball, Football, Basketball, Powerlifting, Golf, Tennis, Track, Baseball & Softball

=== State titles ===
- Boys Basketball -
  - 1955(1A), 1956(1A), 1957(2A), 1959(2A), 1961(2A), 1962(2A), 1963(2A)
- Girls Basketball -
  - 1956(1A), 1957(2A), 1960(2A), 1961(2A)
- Power Lifting -
  - 1997(Div. 2)

Buna High School is the only High School in the State of Texas to win both boys and girls championships (same sport) in the same year three different times 1956, 1957 and 1961.

== Notable alumni ==
- Randy Williams (baseball) Major league Baseball Player
- Steve Schalchlin, Singer/Songwriter
- Mark Nesler, Singer/Songwriter
- Micah Tyler, Christian Singer/Songwriter
