= Southern Pacific GS-6 class =

Class of 16 American 4-8-4 locomotives

Southern Pacific GS-6 Western Pacific GS-64-77
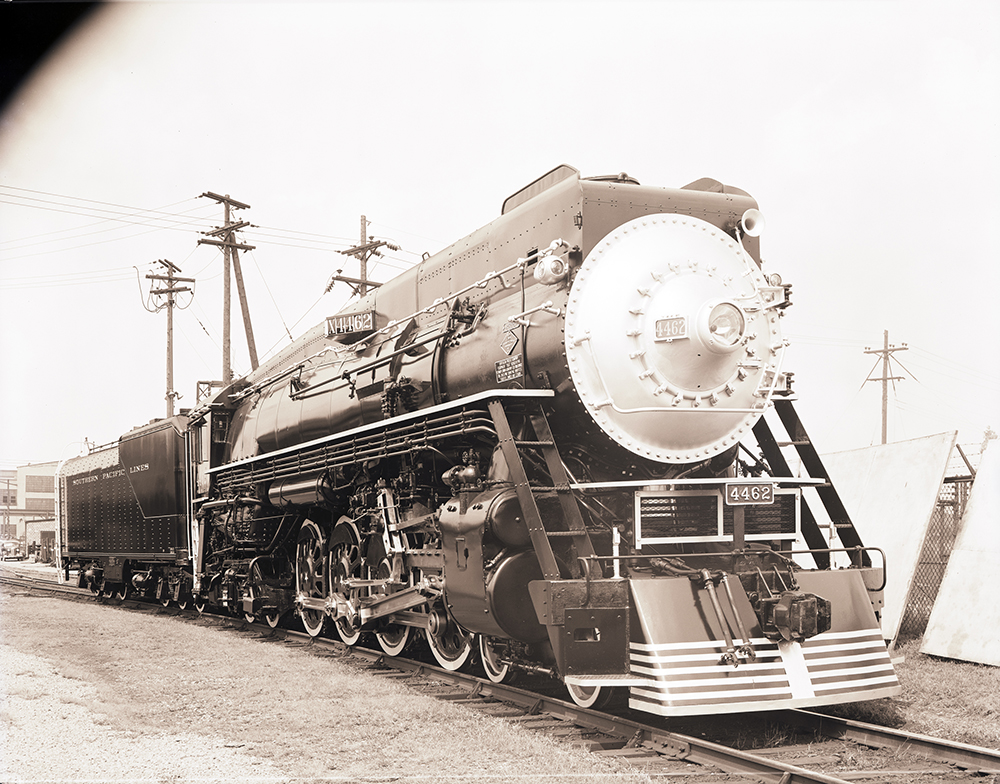
- Southern Pacific GS-6 No. 4462 in 1943
Type and origin
- Power type: Steam
- Builder: Lima Locomotive Works
- Serial number: SP: 8013–8016, 8248–8253; WP: 8017–8022
- Build date: July–August 1943
- Total produced: 10
Specifications
- Configuration
  - Whyte: 4-8-4
  - UIC: 2′D2′ h2
- Gauge: 4 ft 8 1/2 in (1,435 mm) standard gauge
- Driver dia.: 73 1/2 in (1,867 mm)
- Axle load: 67,900 lb (30,800 kilograms; 30.8 metric tons)
- Adhesive weight: 283,200 lb (128,500 kg; 128.5 t)
- Loco weight: 468,400 lb (212,500 kg; 212.5 t)
- Total weight: 867,500 lb (393,500 kg; 393.5 t)
- Firebox
  - Grate area: 90 sq ft (8.4 m^{2})
- Boiler pressure: 260 psi (1.79 MPa)
- Heating surface: 4,582 sq ft (425.7 m^{2})
- Superheater
  - Heating area: 2,086 sq ft (193.8 m^{2})
- Cylinder size: 27 in × 30 in (686 mm × 762 mm)
- Valve gear: Walschaerts
Performance figures
- Tractive effort: 65,759 lbf (292.51 kN), 76,050 lbf (338.29 kN) with booster
Career
- Operators: Southern Pacific; Western Pacific
- Class: SP: GS-6; WP: GS-64-77
- Number in class: SP: 10; WP: 6
- Numbers: SP: 4460–4469; WP: 481–486
- Nicknames: "War Babies", "Baby Daylights"
- First run: 1943
- Retired: SP: 1958; WP: 1953
- Preserved: No. 4460 on static display
- Current owner: National Museum of Transportation
- Disposition: No. 4460 preserved, remainder scrapped

The Southern Pacific Class GS-6 is a class of semi-streamlined 4-8-4 "Northern" type steam locomotive operated by the Southern Pacific Railroad (SP) from 1943 to 1958 and the Western Pacific Railroad (WP) from 1943 to 1953. A total of sixteen were built by the Lima Locomotive Works, numbered 4460 through 4469 by SP and 481 through 486 by WP. GS stands for "Golden State" or "General Service"

== History ==
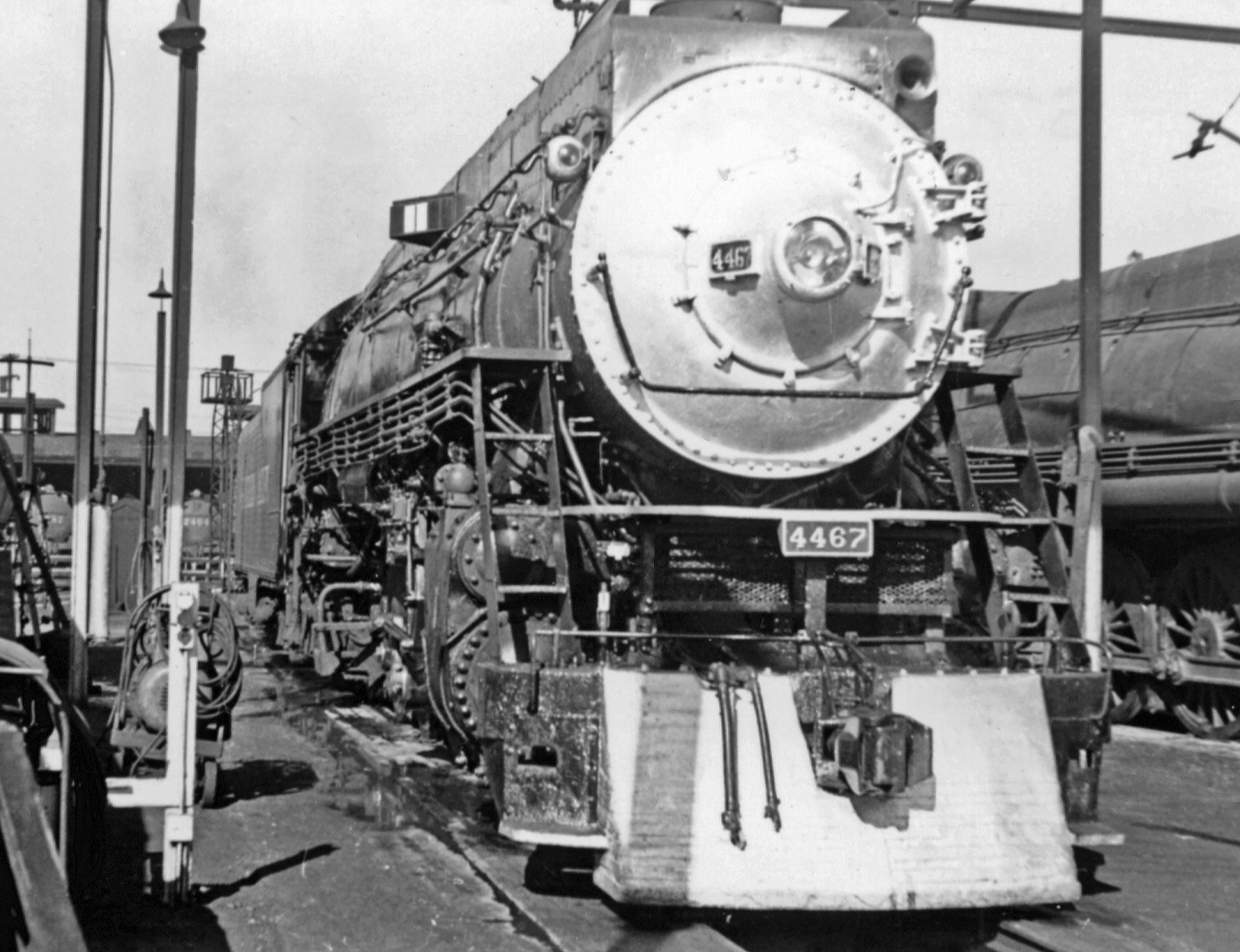
Southern Pacific GS-6 No. 4467 at the Oakland Roundhouse in 1952

When the Southern Pacific Railroad placed an order for fourteen new "Daylight" locomotives from Lima in 1943, World War II was raging and the War Production Board restricted what types of locomotives could be manufactured. SP's order was turned down, with the government deciding that streamlined passenger engines were not necessary to move wartime traffic. Southern Pacific re-designed the engines for general service and the order was finally approved.

The smaller and power-starved Western Pacific Railroad was also looking for locomotives at the time and had first requested diesels, then a different style of steam locomotive. The War Production Board instead diverted six GS-6s (reportedly to have been numbered SP 4470-4475) to the WP. SP patented items were not included and the WP requested Franklin boosters be installed, making them slightly different from the SP engines upon delivery. The WP referred to them as GS-64-77s.

The GS-6 looked similar to the GS-2, with a silver smokebox with a cone-shaped single headlight casing and 73-inch (1.854 m) drivers. Like all GS engines, they had teardrop classification lights and an air horn to supplement their whistle. They retained the skyline casing on the top of the boiler but did not have the side skirting of previous GS locomotives. Southern Pacific's GS-6s also lacked the orange and red "Daylight" paint scheme that the previous GS engines so famously wore. Western Pacific's GS-6s received "elephant ears" similar to that of the Union Pacific Railroad's 4-8-4 locomotives.

The GS-6s were used by Southern Pacific for the San Joaquin Daylight, as well as San Jose-San Francisco Peninsula Commute service and freight service.

The Western Pacific used its GS-6s (GS-64s as WP classified them) on passenger trains and in freight service as well. They acquired a different look from their SP sisters when the WP applied the "elephant ear" style smoke deflectors to all six locomotives. When the Western Pacific dieselized in 1953 they sold three GS-64 engines (WP 481, 484, and 485) to Southern Pacific for spare parts, but kept the tenders and converted them to steam generators for rotary snowplows.

== Preservation ==
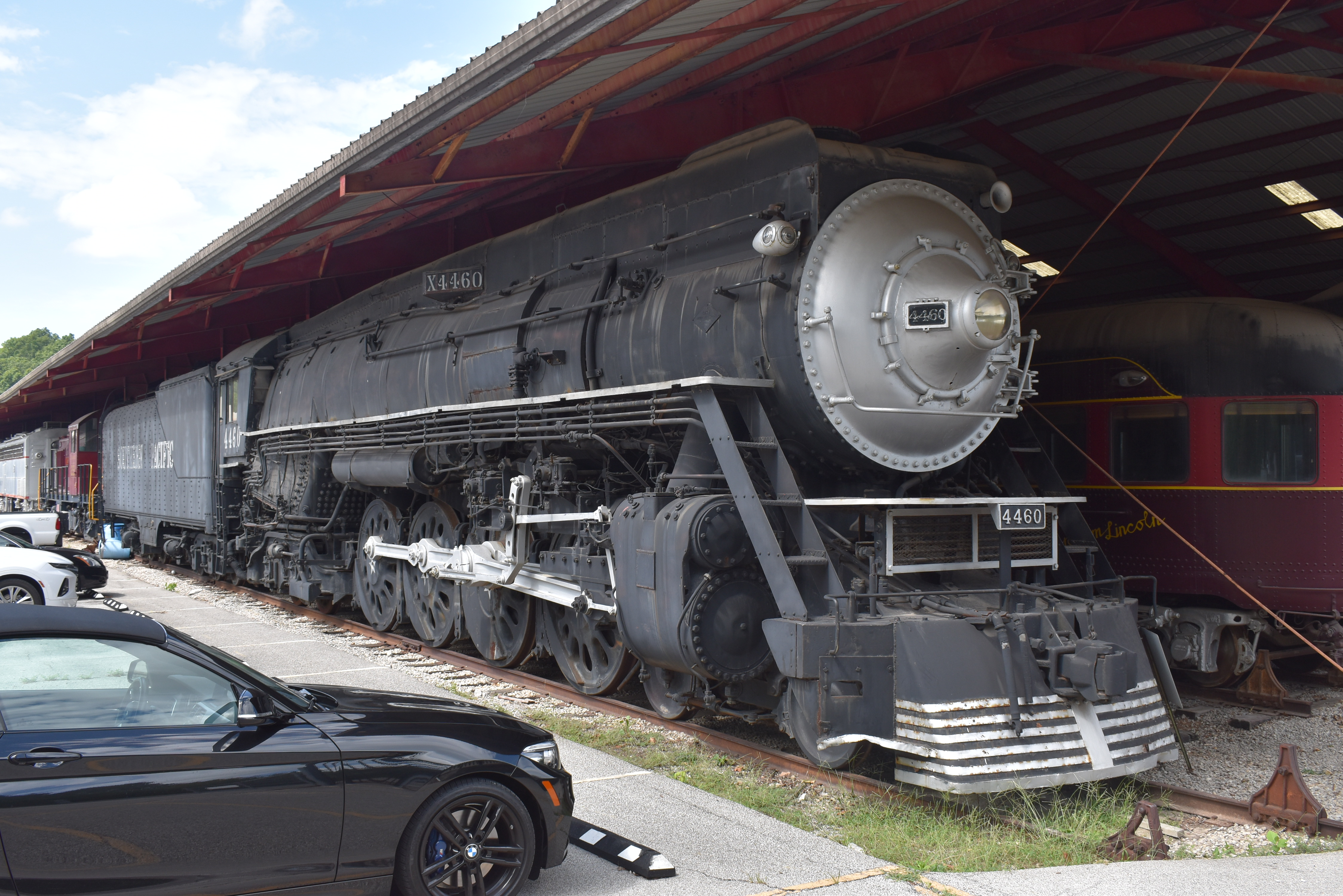
Southern Pacific GS-6 No. 4460 on display at the National Museum of Transportation

- One GS-6 locomotive survives today, Southern Pacific 4460 (the first one to be built), which pulled the final movement of steam of the Southern Pacific Railroad in 1958. It was donated to the National Museum of Transportation in St. Louis, Missouri, where it has remained ever since.
- The tender of Western Pacific GS-6 No. 484, which was used in its final years as a water and fuel tank for a rotary snowplow, is stored at the Western Pacific Railroad Museum in Portola, California.

== Bibliography ==
- Church, Robert J. (2004). Southern Pacific Daylight Locomotives (1st ed.). Signature Press. ISBN 1-930013-11-6.
- Diebert, Timothy S. & Strapac, Joseph A. (1987). Southern Pacific Company Steam Locomotive Compendium. Shade Tree Books. ISBN 0-930742-12-5.
- Johnson, Kenneth G. (2006). Southern Pacific Daylight Steam Locomotives (1st ed.). Specialty Press. ISBN 978-1-58007-194-9.
