= Evadale Independent School District =

School district in Texas, United States

Address
- 908 FM 105 Evadale, Texas, 77615; United States

District information
- Type: Public
- Grades: PK–12
- Schools: 3
- NCES District ID: 4818750

Students and staff
- Students: 384 (2023–2024)
- Teachers: 39.28 (on an FTE basis) (2023–2024)
- Staff: 41.35 (on an FTE basis) (2023–2024)
- Student–teacher ratio: 9.78 (2023–2024)

Other information
- Website: www.evadalek12.net

Evadale Independent School District is a public school district located in the community of Evadale, Texas (USA about 25 miles north of Beaumont. The district has three campuses - Evadale High School (Grades 9-12), Evadale Junior High School (Grades 6-8), and Evadale Elementary School (Grades 1-5).

The majority of the Evadale census-designated place is in this district.

In 2009, the school district was rated "recognized" by the Texas Education Agency. The district made news in June 2015 for refusing to change their Confederate Flag inspired crest despite pressure to do so.
