= Evadale High School =

Public high school in Evadale, Texas, United States

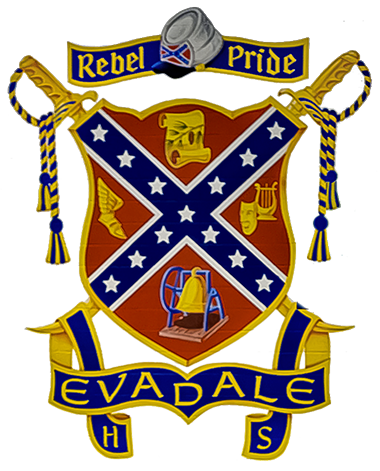

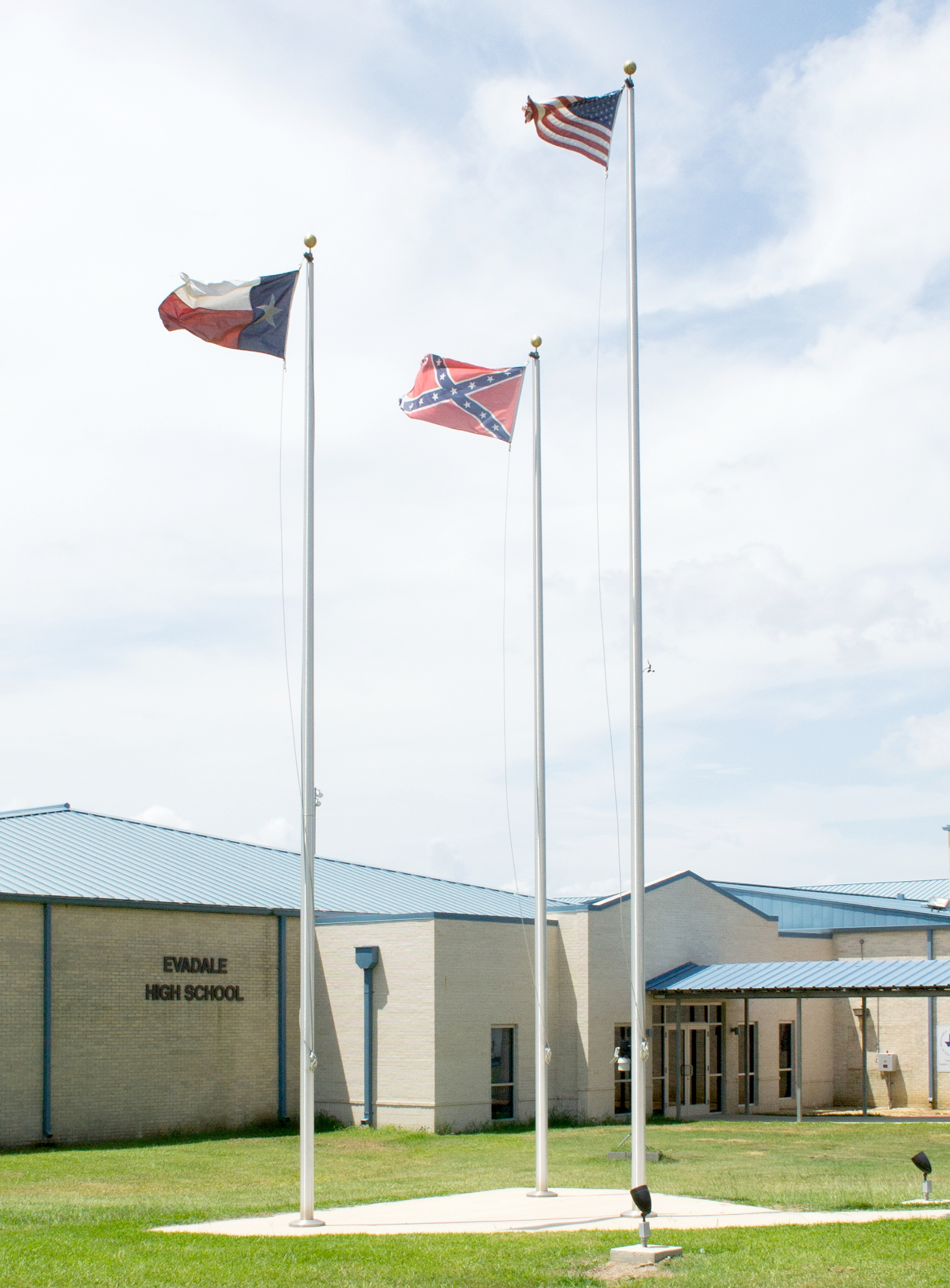

Location
- 230 Private Road 8315; Evadale, Texas 77615-0497; United States; 30°21′13″N 94°3′55″W

Information
- School type: Public high school
- School district: Evadale Independent School District
- Grades: 9-12
- Enrollment: 106 (2023-2024)
- Colors: Blue and gold
- Athletics conference: UIL Class 2A
- Mascot: Rebel
- Yearbook: The Rebel
- Website: evadalek12.net

Evadale High School is a public high school in Evadale, Texas, United States and classified as a 2A school by the UIL. It is part of the Evadale Independent School District which is located in the southwest tip of Jasper County. In 2015, the school was rated "Met Standard" by the Texas Education Agency.

The district made news in June 2015 for refusing to change their Confederate Flag inspired crest despite pressure to do so.

== Athletics ==
The Evadale Rebels compete in Volleyball, Football, Basketball, Track, Baseball & Softball.

== Catfish Festival ==
Every year in May, the Evadale Catfish Festival is held on the High School grounds.
