= Southern Pacific 4460 =

Preserved SP GS-6 class 4-8-4 locomotive

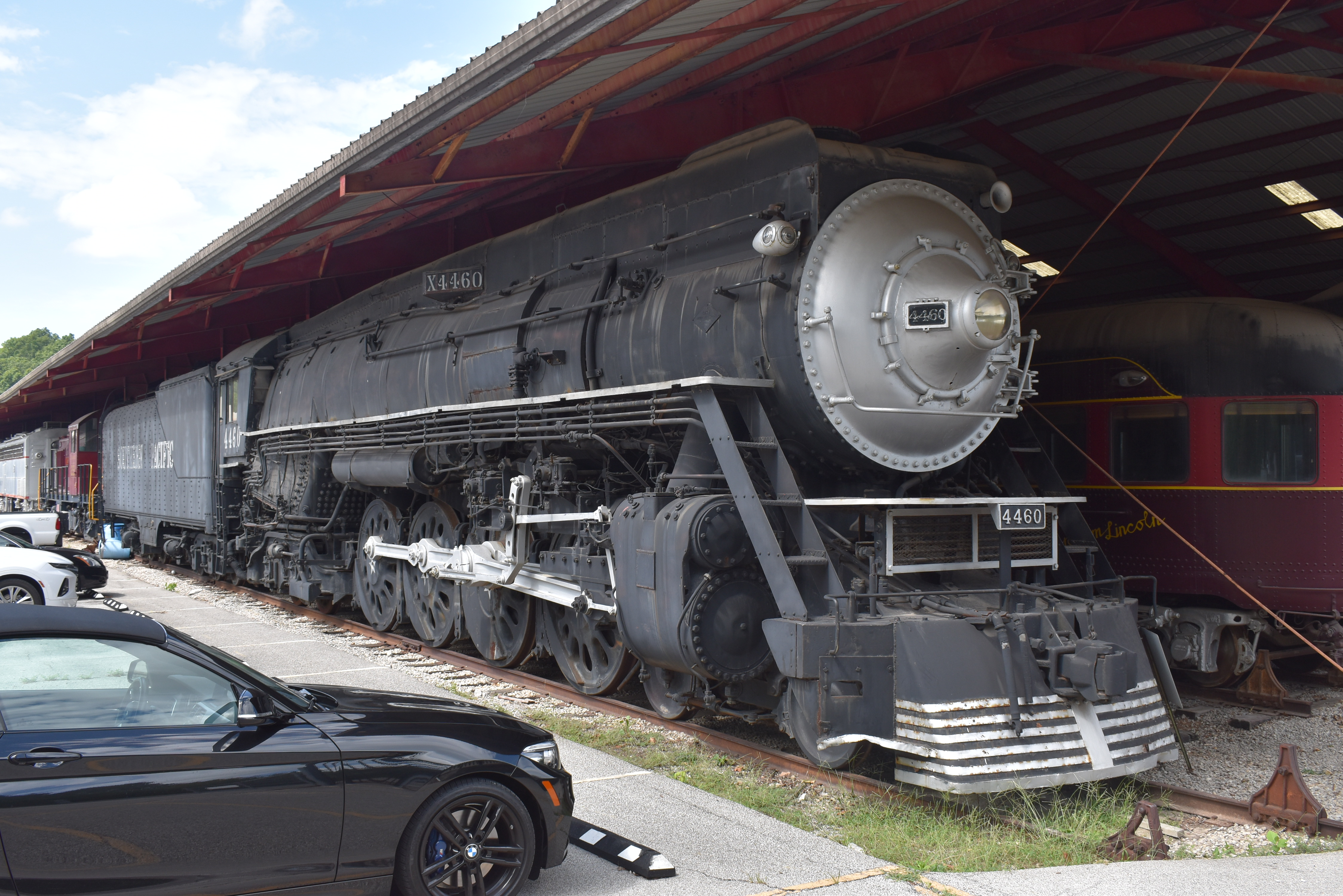
- SP No. 4460 on static display at the National Museum of Transportation
Type and origin
- Power type: Steam
- Builder: Lima Locomotive Works
- Serial number: 8014
- Build date: July 1943
- Total produced: 10
Specifications
- Configuration
  - Whyte: 4-8-4
- Gauge: 4 feet 8 1/2 inches
- Driver dia.: 73 1/2 in (1,867 mm)
- Adhesive weight: 283,000 lb (128,000 kg)
- Loco weight: 468,400 lb (212,500 kg)
- Total weight: 867,500 lb (393,500 kg)
- Fuel type: Bunker oil
- Boiler pressure: 260 psi
- Cylinders: Two, outside
- Cylinder size: 27 in × 30 in (686 mm × 762 mm) dia × stroke
- Valve gear: Walschaerts
- Valve type: Piston valves
- Loco brake: Air
- Train brakes: Air
- Couplers: Knuckle
Performance figures
- Tractive effort: 64,800 lbf (288.24 kN)
Career
- Operators: Southern Pacific Railroad
- Class: GS-6
- Number in class: 10
- Numbers: SP 4460-4469
- Nicknames: War Baby; Black Daylight; The Forgotten Daylight; Blacklight
- Retired: October 1958
- Preserved: April 16, 1959
- Current owner: National Museum of Transportation
- Disposition: On static display

Southern Pacific 4460 is the only surviving GS-6 class 4-8-4 "Northern" type steam locomotive, together with "GS-4" class Southern Pacific 4449, which is operational in excursion service. The GS-6 is a semi-streamlined 4-8-4 "Northern" type steam locomotive. GS stands for "Golden State" or "General Service". The locomotive was built by the Lima Locomotive Works (LLW) for the Southern Pacific Railroad (SP) in 1943. The GS-6 lacked side skirting and red and orange "Daylight" paint found on previous locomotives of the GS class and were painted black and silver instead. The War Production Board controlled locomotive manufacturers during World War II and had turned down Southern Pacific's order of fourteen new Daylight locomotives in 1942. Southern Pacific re-designed the new fleet based on the older GS-2s, only with 260 psi instead of 300 psi, an all-weather cab, and a new GS-4 style tender. The design was finally approved, but the War Production Board reassigned four to the smaller and power-starved Western Pacific Railroad (only the tender from Western Pacific GS-6/GS-4 #484 remains). Their smaller size when compared to previous GS class locomotives and the fact that they were built during World War II earned them the nicknames "War Babies".

== History ==
=== Revenue service ===
No. 4460 was built in July 1943 and was used during World War II and after. It derailed in 1956 but returned to service. The engine was the first GS-6 ever manufactured and is famous for pulling the last steam-powered passenger train and being the last operational steam locomotive on the Southern Pacific Railroad in October 1958. That final run was from Sacramento, California to Sparks, Nevada, and return, with no diesel assistance except for when No. 4460 developed a hot bearing. A local Boy Scout Bugler from the Bay Area Council, played taps for the funeral of the No. 4460, staged by the Southern Pacific Railroad.

=== Preservation ===
Following the final excursion, No. 4460 was donated to the National Museum of Transportation in St. Louis, Missouri, on April 16, 1959, where the engine has since sat along with many other historic steam and diesel locomotives from around the country. Besides having the nicknames "Black Daylight" and "War Baby", it is also known as the "Forgotten Daylight" as it has not seen the fame locomotive No. 4449 has had when that engine was restored to operating condition back in 1975.
