= DiDia 150 =

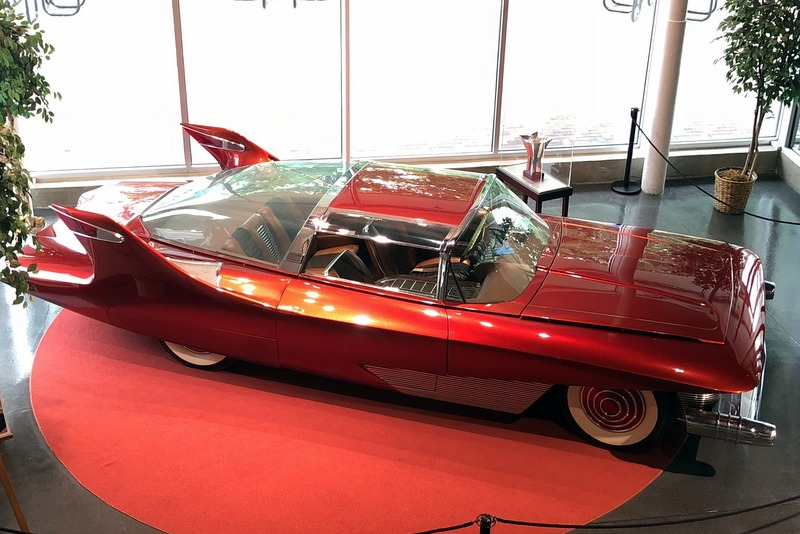

Overview
- Production: 1953–1960

The 1960 DiDia 150 is a luxury, custom-designed iconic, handmade car also known as the "Dream Car" forever associated with its second owner, singer Bobby Darin. Built in Detroit, Michigan, clothing designer Andrew "Andy" Di Dia designed this "unrestrained and unconventional" automobile. Only one example was ever built.

== Description ==
The car was originally powered by a 365 cubic inch Cadillac engine, later replaced by a 427 cubic inch high-performance Ford engine, and had a 125-inch wheelbase, with a tubular aluminum frame and a hand-fashioned soft aluminum body. The car has Batmanesque set of rear fins dominating the bodyline and ruby red hubcaps on whitewall tires. Writer Daniel Vaughan describes it as

...an exotic vehicle that is overdone in every detail and in every respect, an iconic dream car. Its metallic red paint was from 30 coats of paint with real ground diamonds for sparkle. ...The body is from hand-fashioned soft aluminum. There are hidden headlights and tail lights that swivel as the car turns. Inside, the seats each have their own ash tray, cigarette lighter, and radio speaker. On the dash are oversized levers that control the air conditioning, heater and defroster.

== History ==
The car was designed by Andrew Di Dia, a clothing designer, who Bobby Darin had met while on tour in Detroit in 1957. Darin told Di Dia at the time that he would purchase the car if he ever "hit it big".

For seven years, from 1953 to 1960 the DiDia 150 was hand-built by four workers, at a cost of $93,647.29 but sold to Darin in 1961 at a cost of over $150,000 (1.5 million today). At the time the car was listed as most expensive "custom-made" car in the world by the Guinness Book of Records. The body was hand-formed by Ron Clark and constructed by Bob Kaiser from Clark Kaiser Customs.

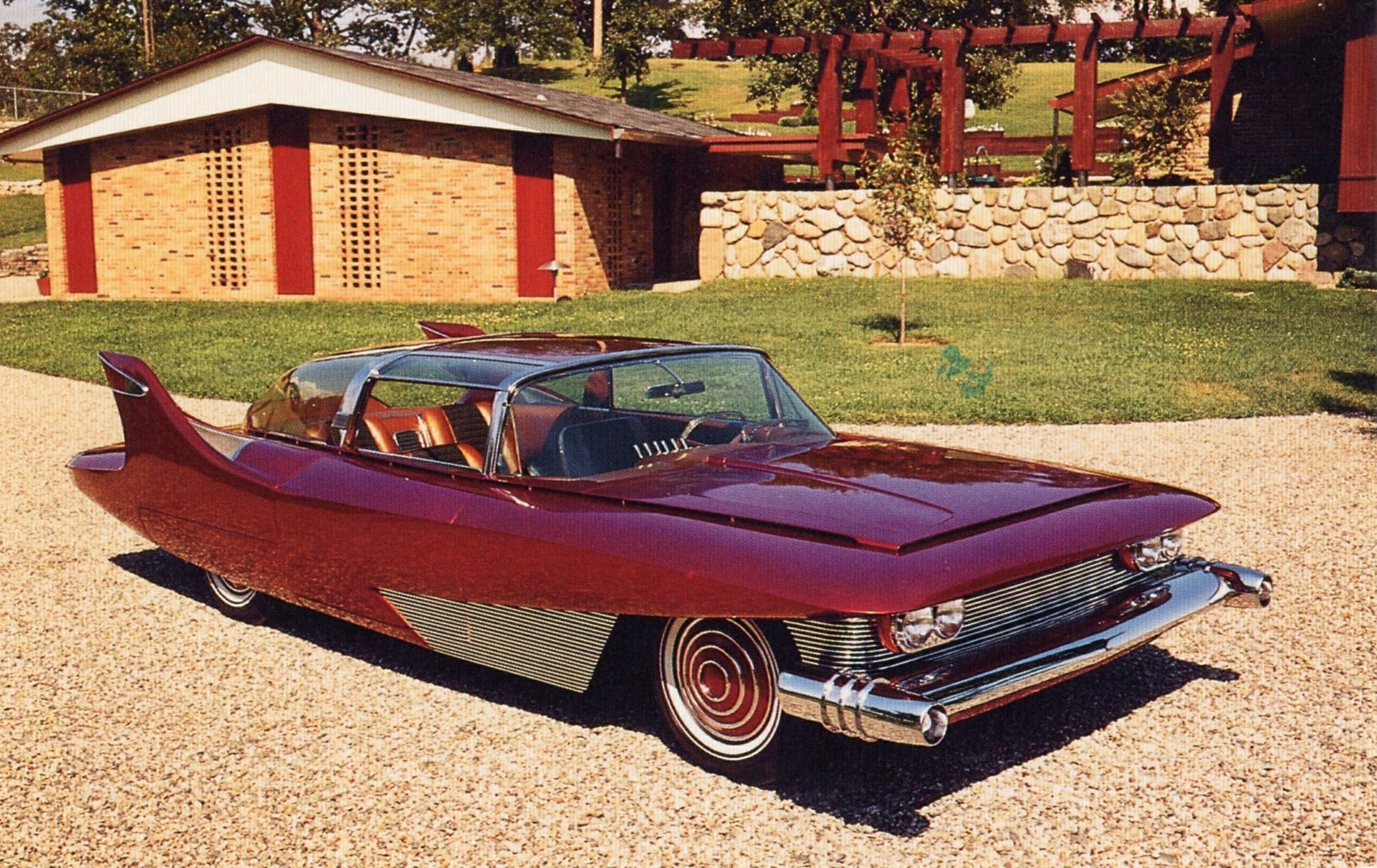
Bobby Darin's Di Dia 150

Darin drove his wife, Sandra Dee, in the car to the 34th Academy Awards in 1961.

When Bobby drove the car to the Academy Awards, I and Steve Blauner followed behind him in a limousine. The car had two fans and a switch that you had to turn on. Bobby didn't realize, so it heated up. All the magazines said the car caught fire but it didn't.

— Andrew Di Dia

Di Dia toured the car around the country, when Darin wasn't using it for public appearances. After publicity and film use, Darin donated his "Dream Car" to the National Museum of Transportation in 1970 where it remains. It was restored by Mike Manns of Manns Auto Body in Festus, Missouri before going on display.

== Specifications ==
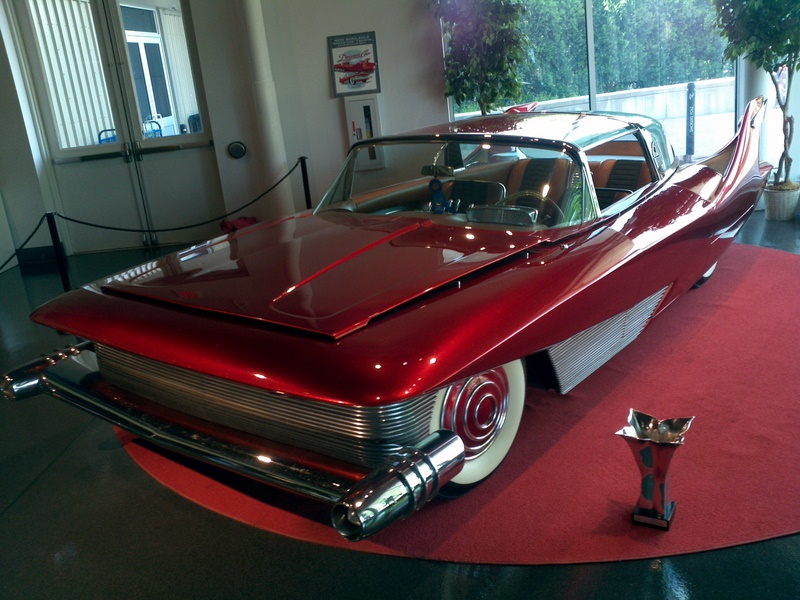

The gasoline-fueled V8 engine (originally 365 cid, later upgraded to 427 cid) is located at the front. It is rear-wheel drive. The body and chassis are hand-formed from 064 aluminum with a unitized alloy tube frame.

It has a glass cockpit in back, a squared steering wheel resembling a superellipse (with n = 3/2, a = b = 1) and thermostatically controlled air conditioning system. The interior is rust colored in contrast to the ruby paintwork. The design included the first backseat-mounted radio loudspeakers and hidden windshield wipers, which start themselves when it rains. Other features include retractable headlamps, rear turn signals which swivel as the car turns, 'floating' bumpers and a trunk that was hinged from the driver's side. Each of the four bucket seats have their own thermostatically controlled air conditioning, individual cigarette lighters and ashtrays, as well as a radio loudspeaker. The original engine, a Cadillac V8, was later replaced by a high-performance Ford engine when it was taken on the show circuit.
