= Buna Independent School District =

School district in Texas, United States

Address
- 1022 Texas State Highway 62 Buna, Texas, 77612; United States

District information
- Type: Public
- Grades: PK–12
- Schools: 3
- NCES District ID: 4812090

Students and staff
- Students: 1,460 (2023–2024)
- Teachers: 116.37 (on an FTE basis) (2023–2024)
- Staff: 161.43 (on an FTE basis) (2023–2024)
- Student–teacher ratio: 12.55 (2023–2024)

Other information
- Website: www.bunaisd.net

Buna Independent School District is a public school district based in the community of Buna, Texas (USA).

It includes the Buna census-designated place and a small portion of the Evadale CDP.

In 2009, the school district was rated "academically acceptable" by the Texas Education Agency.

== Schools ==
The District includes:

- Buna Elementary School
- Buna Junior High School
- Buna High School
