= Echo, Texas =

Census designated place in Orange County, Texas, United States

Coordinates: 30.15271°N 93.73239°W

Echo, Texas (Orange County) is a populated place which was founded in 1880. The Louisiana Western Extension Railroad Company was given the task of completing the last section of the Texas and New Orleans Railroad crossing the Sabine River, linking Houston with New Orleans. The swampland directly east of Orange was considered unsuitable for the railway construction, so the company pushed the line to the north and east and established a quarantine station. The site was given the name Echo, because the sounds of the railway reverberated in the nearby river swamp. Years later, the quarantine station would be removed, but this site located three miles northeast of Orange would still function as a freight yard for the Southern Pacific Railroad as well as an industrial site. In 1965, Echo would also be the construction starting point for the Sabine River and Northern Railroad, which would link the Southern Pacific to the Gulf, Colorado and Santa Fe Railway servicing the timber industry of the region.
