= National Museum of Transportation =

Museum in Kirkwood, Missouri, USA

Coordinates: 38.572°N 90.462°W

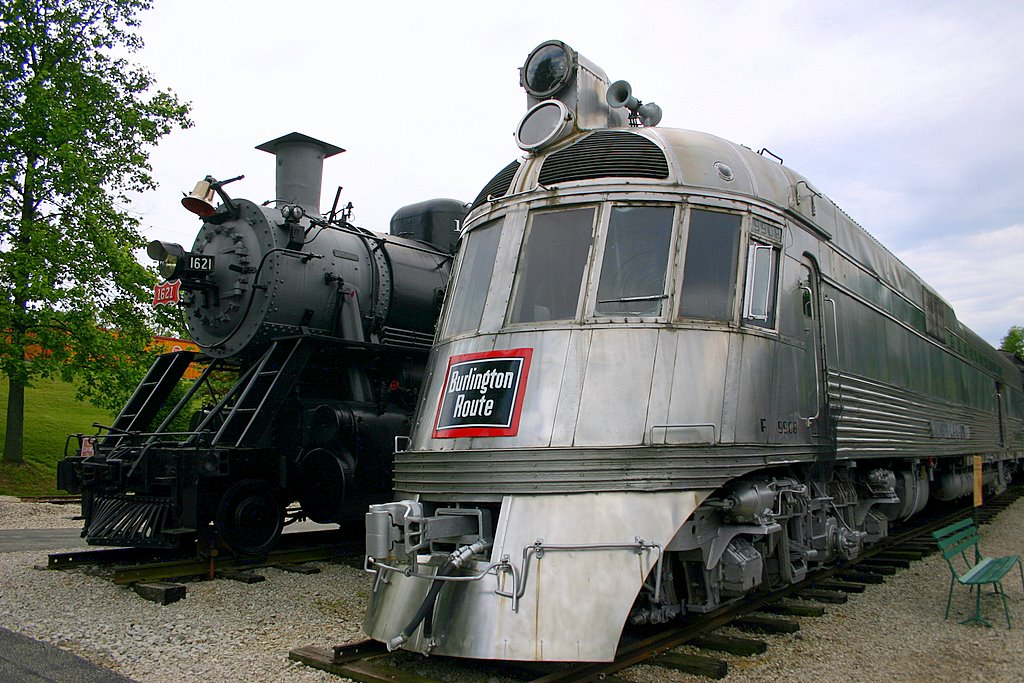
- The General Pershing Zephyr’s 9908 ‘Silver Charger’ and Frisco 2-10-0 N° 1621 on display at the National Museum of Transportation.
- Established: 1944
- Location: Kirkwood, Missouri
- Type: Transport museum
- Director: Richard Chenault
- Website: www.transportmuseumassociation.org

The National Museum of Transportation (TNMOT) is a private, 42-acre transportation museum in Kirkwood, Missouri. Founded in 1944, it restores, preserves, and displays vehicles from the late 1800s to the present: mainly locomotives and railroad equipment, but also cars, aircraft, and a boat. The museum contains a research library of transportation-related memorabilia and documents.

At the southwest corner of the property is West Barretts Tunnel. Built in 1853, it is one of a pair of tunnels that were the first to operate west of the Mississippi River. It was added to the National Register of Historic Places in 1978.

The museum has its own railway spur to an active main line formerly owned by the Missouri Pacific Railroad, now by the Union Pacific Railroad. This has allowed the museum to take possession of large and unusual pieces of railroad equipment. A miniature railroad operates around a loop of track near the parking lot. A restored trolley operates Thursday–Sunday from March through December.

== Vehicles and equipment ==
=== Trolleys ===
A working trolley line was established in the 1990s after the museum acquired SLPS #1743 from the San Francisco Municipal Railway. A group of volunteers installed about 1,000 feet of overhead wire above a section of the former Union Pacific mainline near the Abbott Building, allowing restored historical trolleys to operate. In 1998, PTC #2740 was restored by Museum of Transportation Trolley Volunteers and added to the operating fleet, while #1743 was placed in storage.

In 1997, MTTV began renovating Water Works #10, at first cosmetically, and then mechanically. After three and a half years of work, #10 became operational once again. On Memorial Day 2001, it ran for the first time in 46 years; by the summer of 2002, it had joined the museum's active fleet.

Originally, the demonstration trolley line was a straight route, requiring trolleys to travel back and forth. Volunteers added a loop at the east end after the museum acquired some tracks from a streetcar loop in Boston. Construction began in spring 2002 and was completed in March 2003. All trolleys except #2740 can run around the loop and back from the direction it came. Around the same time, a high-level platform was built in front of the Roberts Pavilion to accommodate the newly acquired CTA rapid transit car #44 for passenger loading and unloading.

In 2011, MTTV began adding track to connect the line to the Lindburg Automobile Center, enabling visitors to ride the trolley between the Roberts building and the automotive exhibits. The project remains uncompleted as of 2025.

On May 21, 2016, SLPS #1743 returned to service on the 50th anniversary of the end of streetcar operations in St. Louis. In 2024, the line was named the Neil F. Norkaitis Demonstration Trolley Line after the former trolley operations director.

==== Operational trolleys ====
No.	Image	Type	Builder	Built	Former Operator	Acquired	Restored	Current Status	Refs.
1743		PCC streetcar	St. Louis Car Company	1946	St. Louis Public Service Company, MUNI	1990	1990's	Under repair	
2740		PCC streetcar	St. Louis Car Company	1947	Philadelphia Transportation Company	1995	1998	In operation	
10		suburban trolley	St. Louis Car Company	1914	St. Louis Waterworks	1957	2001	Under repair	
44		CTA 1-50 series	St. Louis Car Company	1960	Chicago Transit Authority	1998	2000	In operation	
1533		Birney Safety Car	American Car Company	1919	Kansas City Public Service Company	1949	-	Under restoration	

==== Non-operational trolleys ====
- Bi-State Development Agency No. 165
- Bi-State Development Agency No. 1664
- Bi-State Development Agency No. 215
- Bi-State Development Agency No. 60
- Illinois Terminal Railroad No. 104
- Illinois Terminal Railroad No. 410
- Illinois Traction System No. 241
- Purdue University No. 2611
- St. Louis Public Service Company No. 1001
- St. Louis Public Service Company No. 1005
- St. Louis Public Service Company No. 215
- St. Louis Public Service Company No. 2250
- St. Louis Public Service Company No. 426
- St. Louis Public Service Company No. 615
- St. Louis Public Service Company No. 850
- St. Louis Public Service Company No. 894
- St. Louis Waterworks Railway No. #17

=== Railroad ===
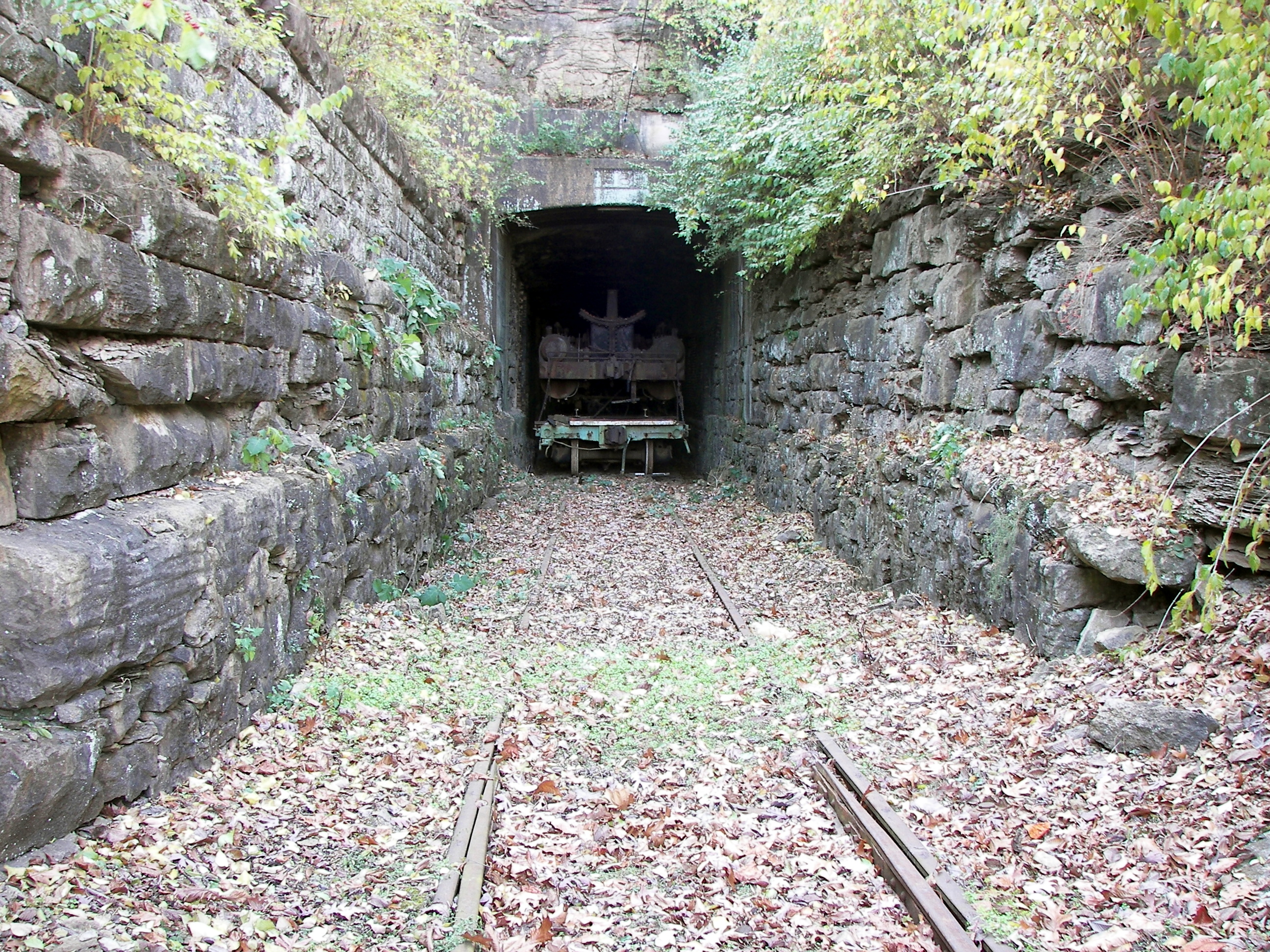
The museum's grounds include Barretts Tunnel, one of the first railroad tunnels west of the Mississippi River.

Among its railroad items are:

- Aerotrain No. 3
- The only surviving Milwaukee Road class EP-2 Bi-Polar Electric.
- Union Pacific Big Boy No. 4006. The largest steam locomotive of the museum's collection.
- Norfolk & Western Y6a class 2-8-8-2 No. 2156. The only surviving Norfolk & Western Y6a and the second largest steam locomotive in the collection.
- Union Pacific Centennial No. 6944. One of the final Centennial locomotives built.
- Southern Pacific class GS-6 "War Baby" No. 4460, the sole surviving GS-6.
- Atchison, Topeka & Santa Fe 2-10-4 No. 5011.
- Chesapeake & Ohio K-4 No. 2727
- Baltimore and Ohio Railroad No. 50. The only surviving EMC 1800 hp B-B locomotive
- EMD FT No. 103, the first F-unit built, a National Engineering Landmark.
- Delaware, Lackawanna, and Western 4-4-0C No. 952, one of two DL&W steam locomotives and one of five Camelbacks in existence.
- Erie Lackawanna EMD SD45 No. 3607.
- Missouri-Kansas-Texas 4-4-0 No. 311, the sole surviving M-K-T steam locomotive.
- Chicago & Illinois Midland 2-8-2 No. 551, the sole surviving C&IM steam locomotive.
- Ferrovie dello Stato Italiane (Italian State Railroad) E550.025 electric locomotive. The only locomotive brought from outside the United States of America.
- New York Central 4-8-2 No. 2933, one of two surviving examples of large NYC steam power.
- Wabash 2-6-0 No. 573, one of only two Wabash steam locomotives in existence.
- Union Pacific No. 900081, a rotary snowplow.
- The Whale, largest tank car ever built.
- A PRR P5 electric locomotive No. 4700. The sole surviving P5.
- Chicago, Burlington and Quincy Railroad No. 9908 "The Silver Charger", the locomotive of the General Pershing Zephyr.
- Sabine River & Northern Railroad EMD NC #408. Originally built in 1937 as EJ&E #202.
- St Louis - San Francisco No. 1522, used in excursion service from 1988 to 2002.
- St. Louis - San Francisco 1621, a sibling to 1630 at the Illinois Railway Museum in Union, Illinois.
- A PRR GG1 electric locomotive No. 4918.
- Chicago and Northwestern 4-4-2 No. 1015, the only surviving Chicago and North Western class D Atlantic.
- New York, Chicago and St. Louis Railroad 4-6-4 No. 170, the only surviving Nickel Plate L1a Hudson.
- Hyperloop One ∞ XP-2
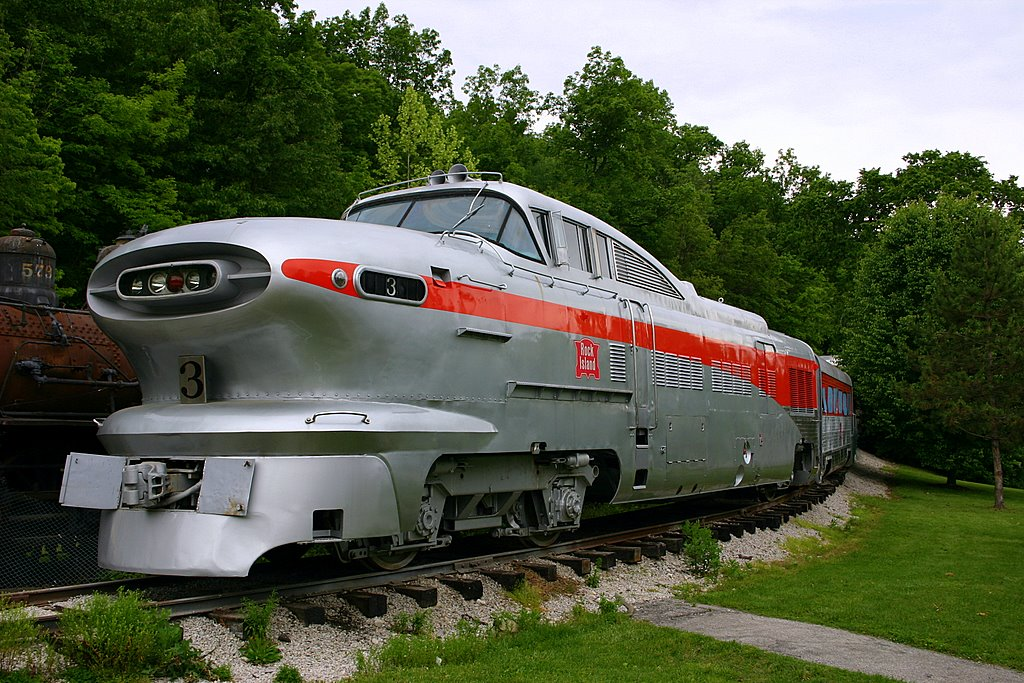
A 1950s GM Aerotrain from the Rock Island railroad.

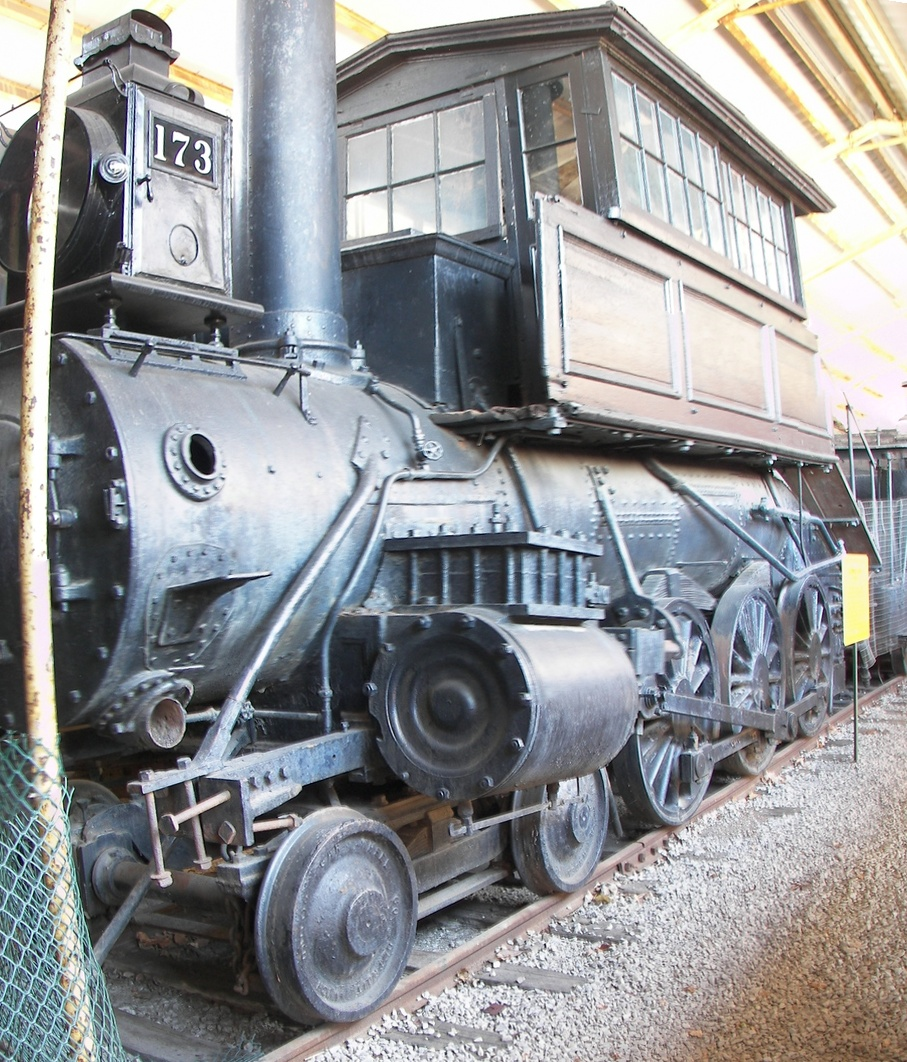
A 4-6-0 Camelback locomotive built by the Baltimore and Ohio Railroad in 1873.

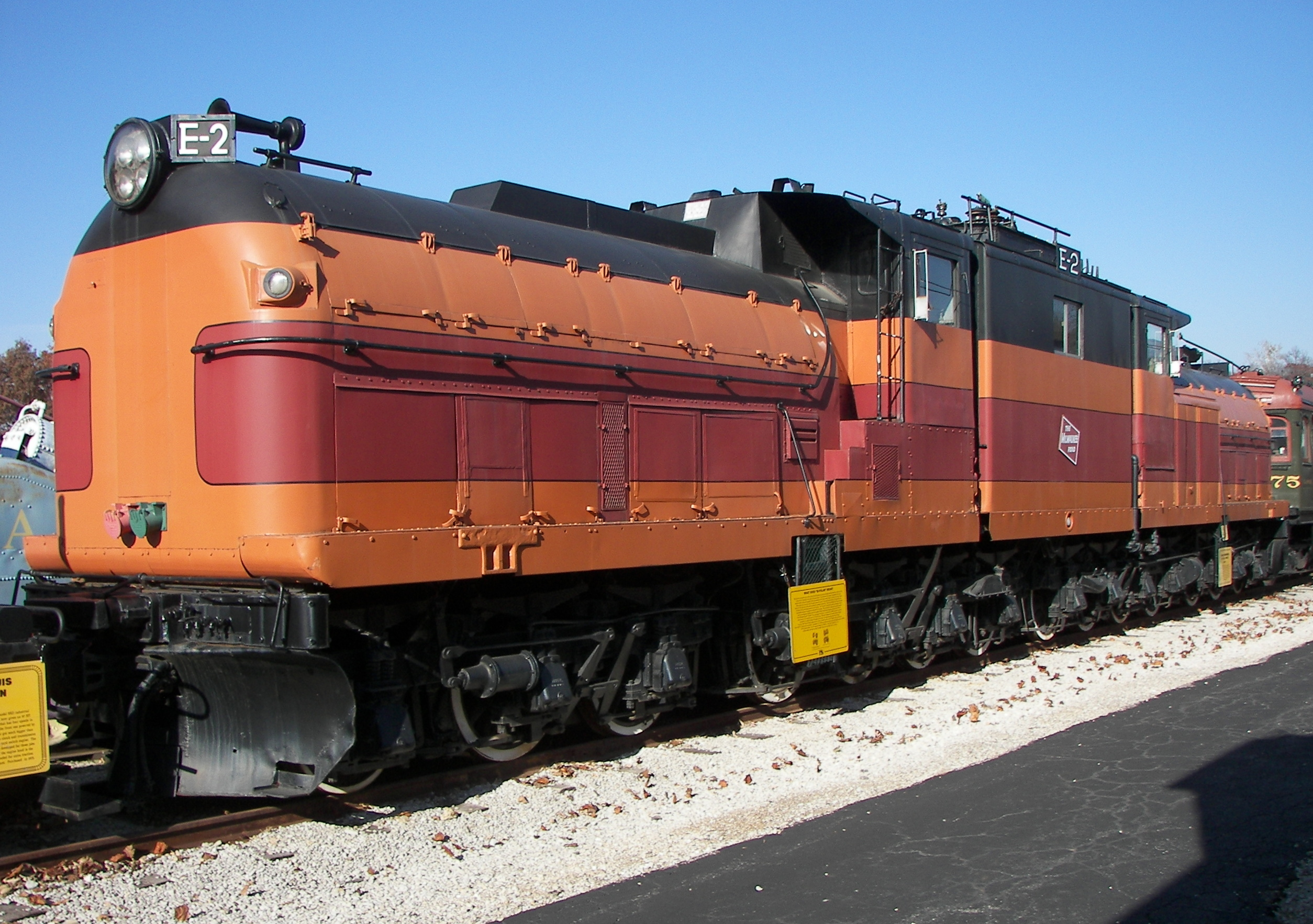
Only surviving Milwaukee Road class EP-2 electric locomotive.

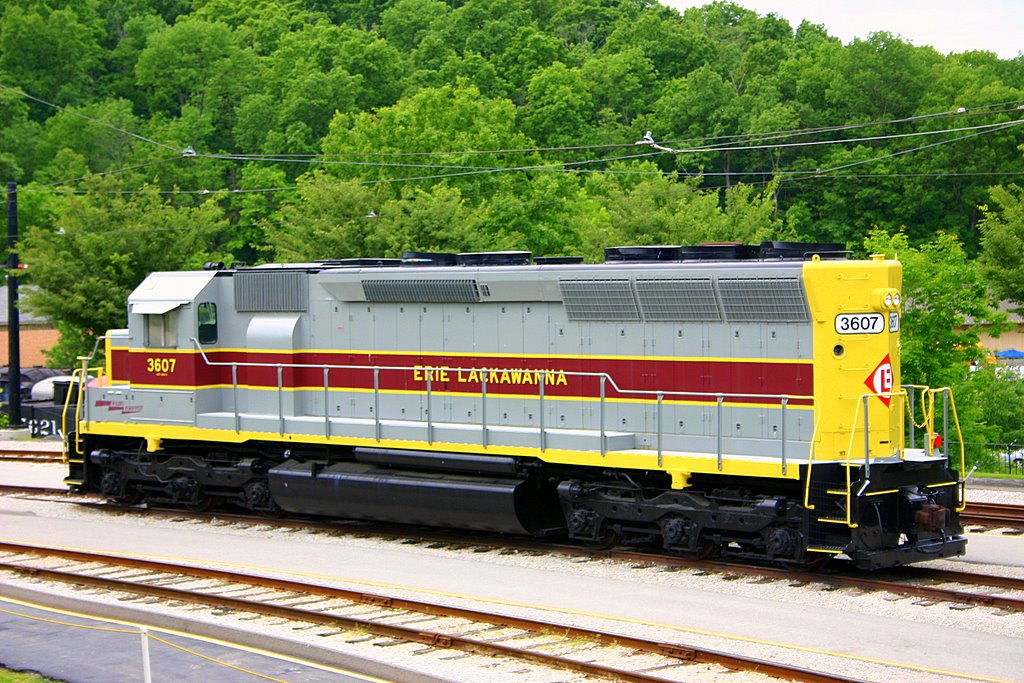
An Erie Lackawanna Railway EMD SD45 restored to its original condition.

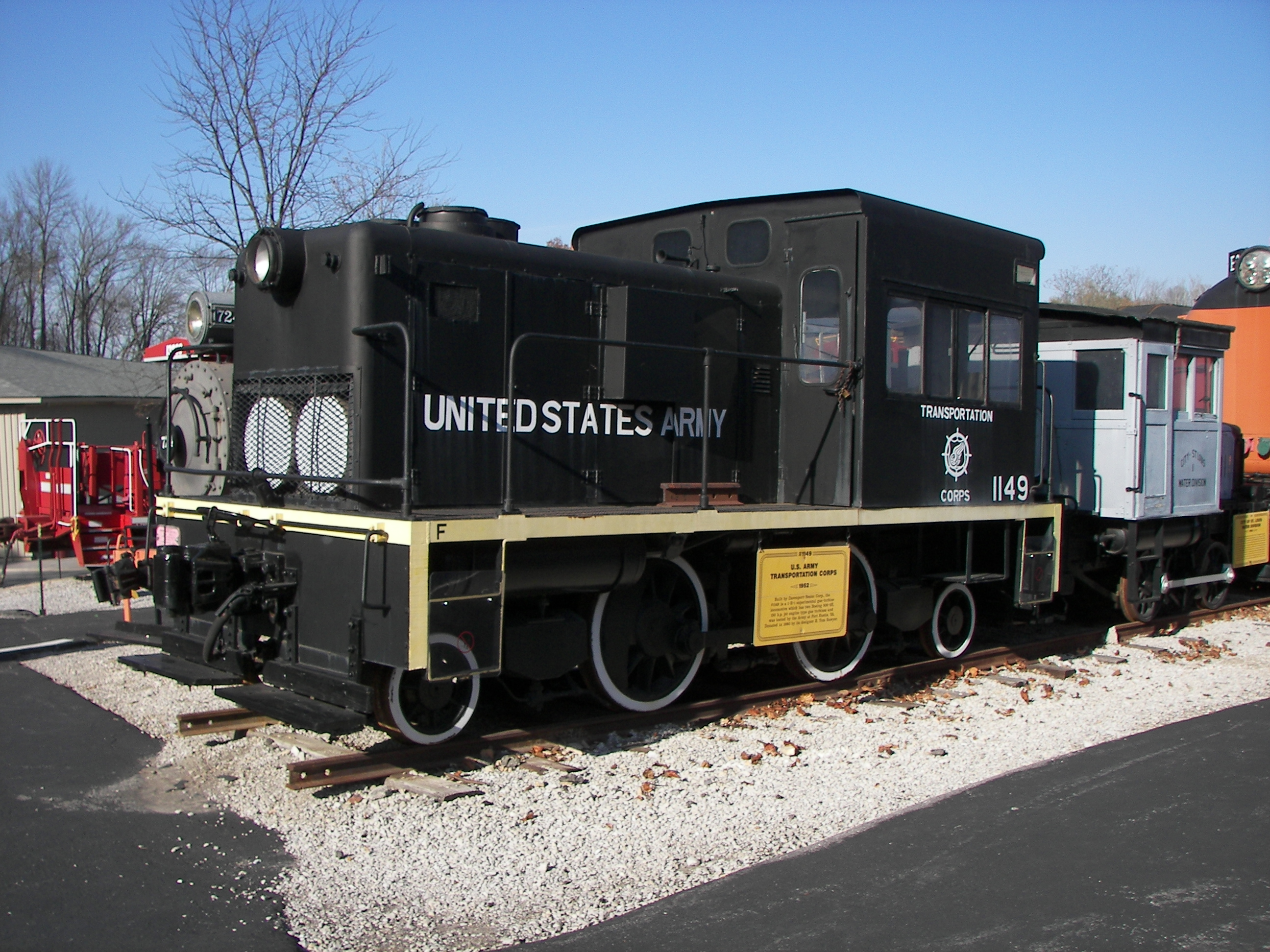
United States Army gas turbine locomotive 1149d.

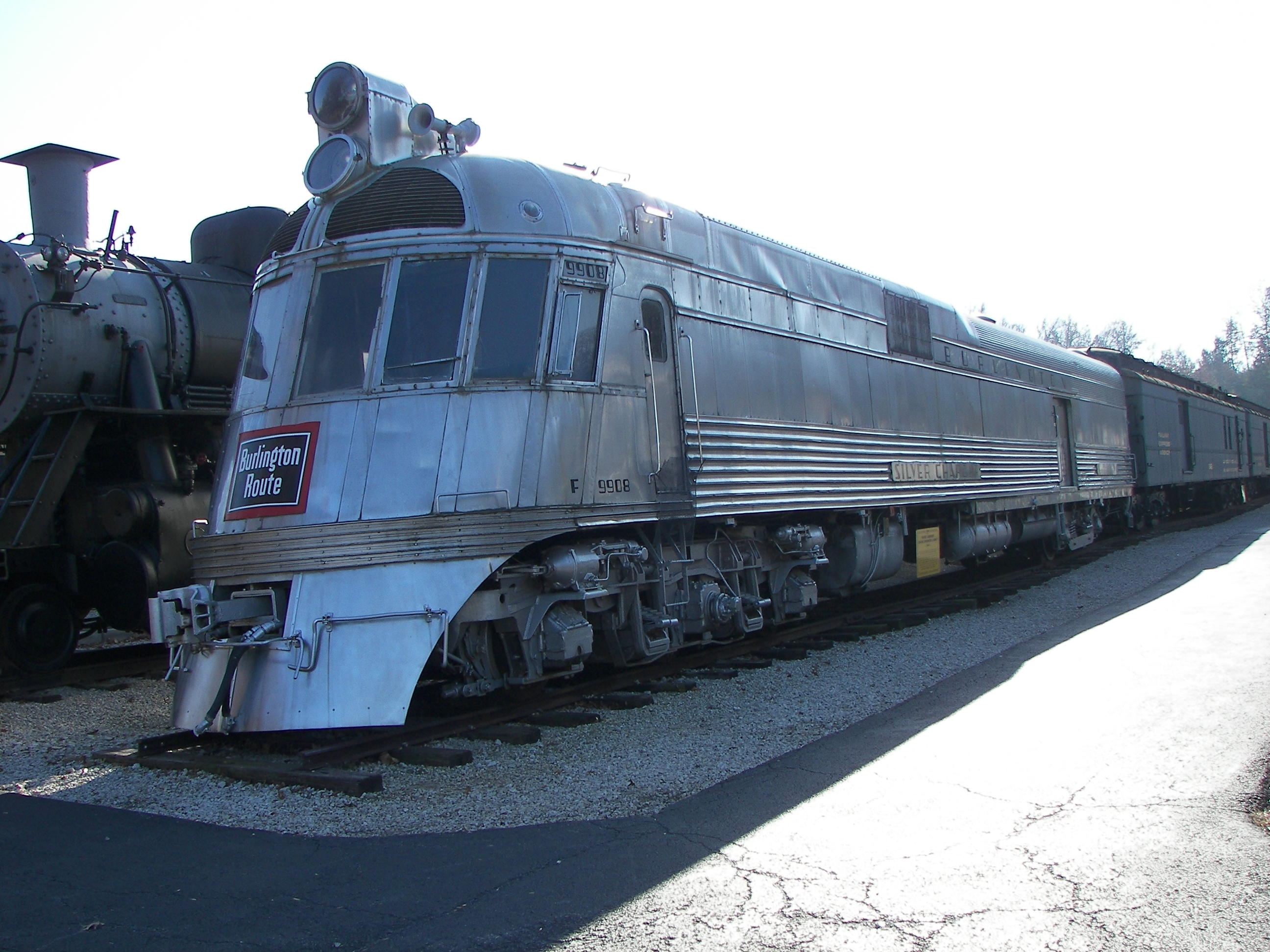
The 9908 Silver Charger, which drew the General Pershing Zephyr train.

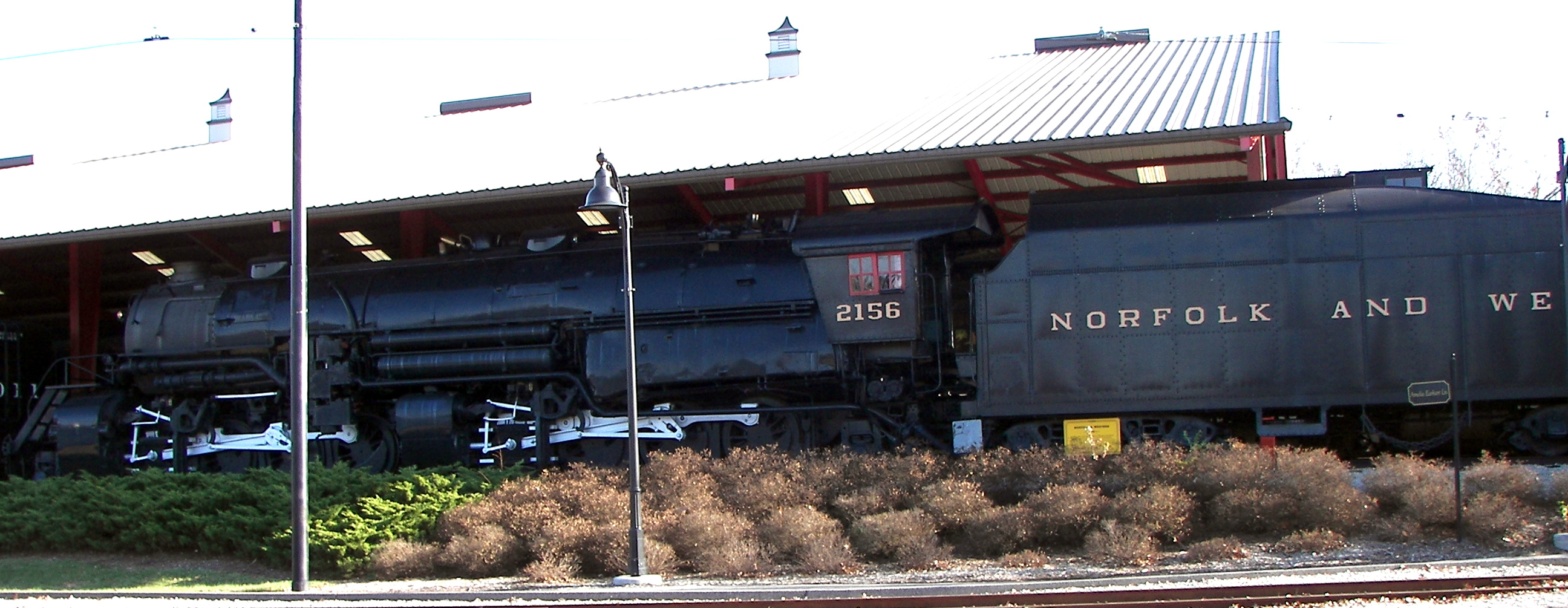
Norfolk & Western 2156, the strongest-pulling steam locomotive in existence.

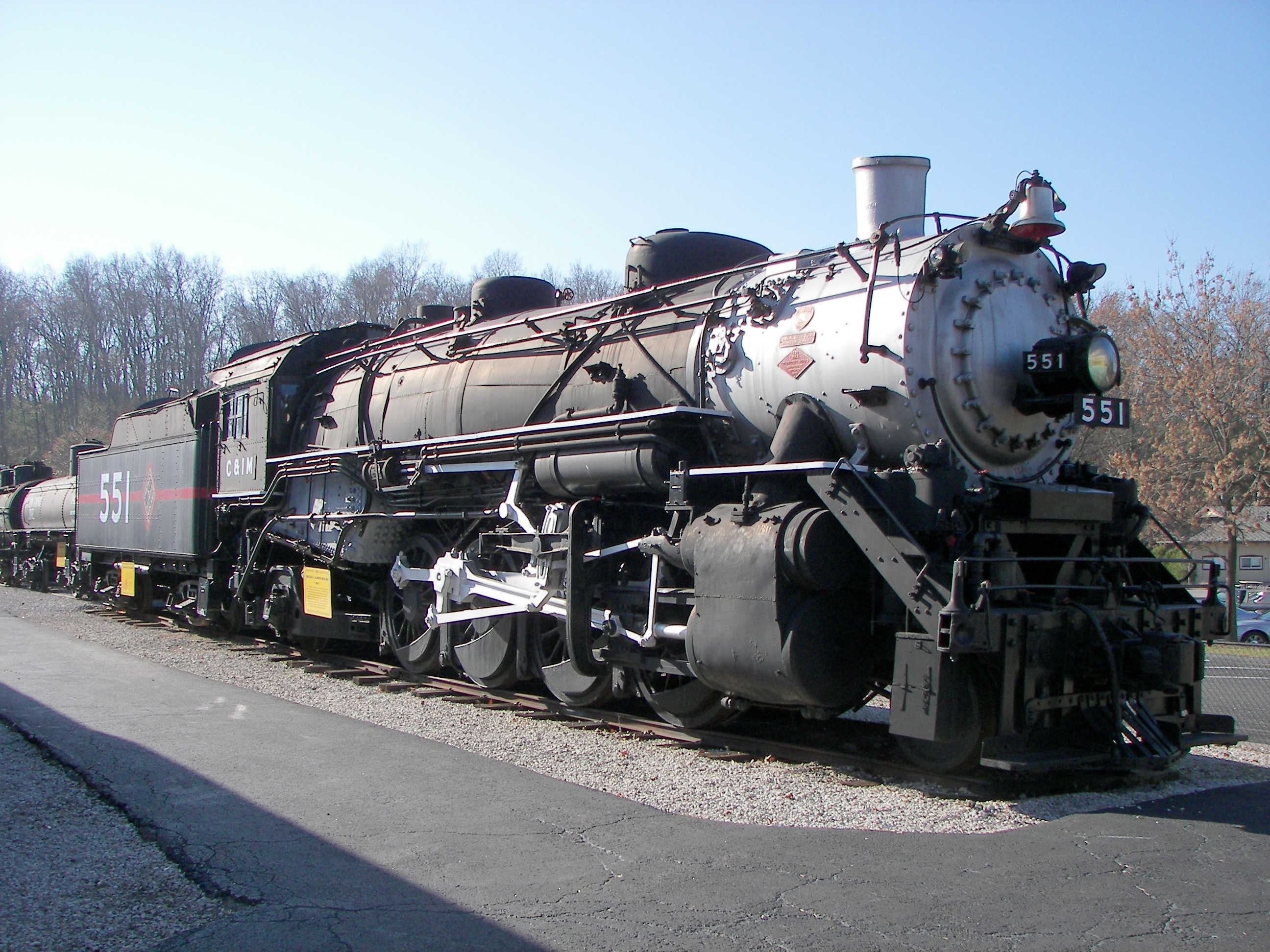
USRA Light Mikado steam locomotive with a 2-8-2 wheel arrangement.

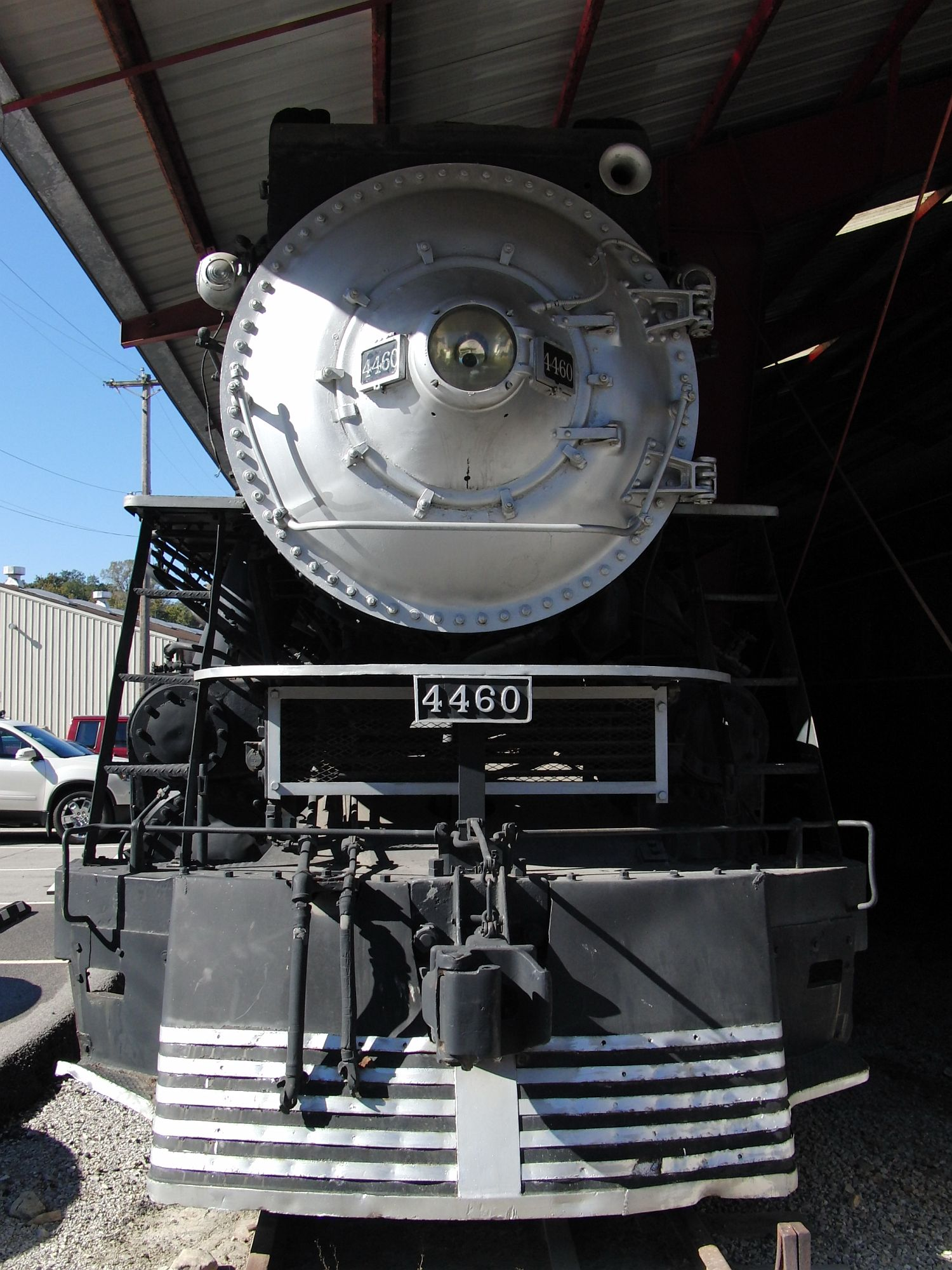
A Southern Pacific GS-6 War Baby steam locomotive 4-8-4 wheel arrangement.

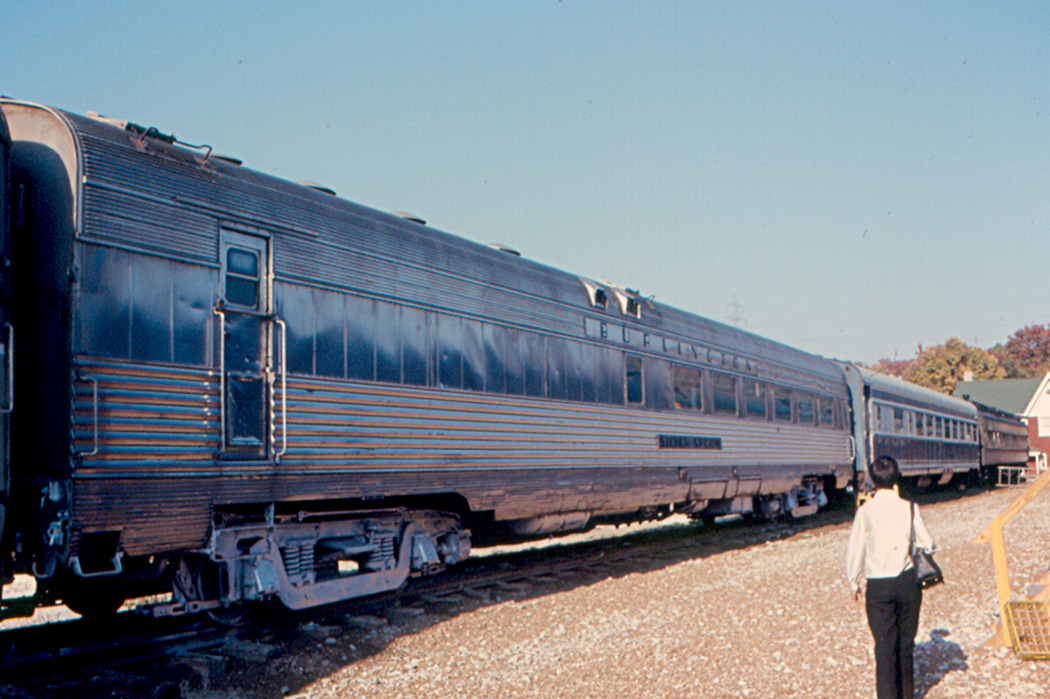
Budd-built CB&Q Zephyr diner Silver Spoon.

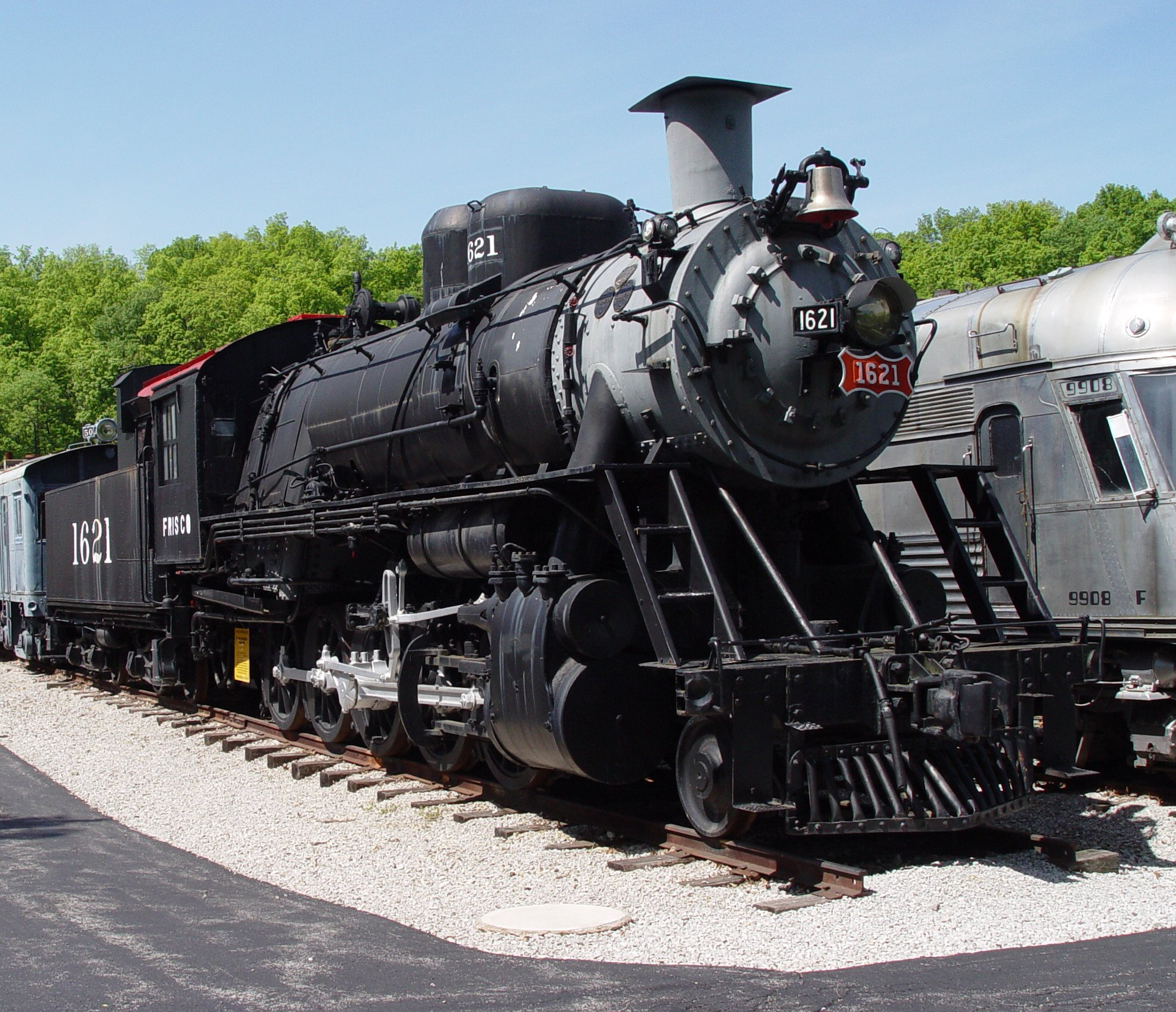
Frisco Number 1621.

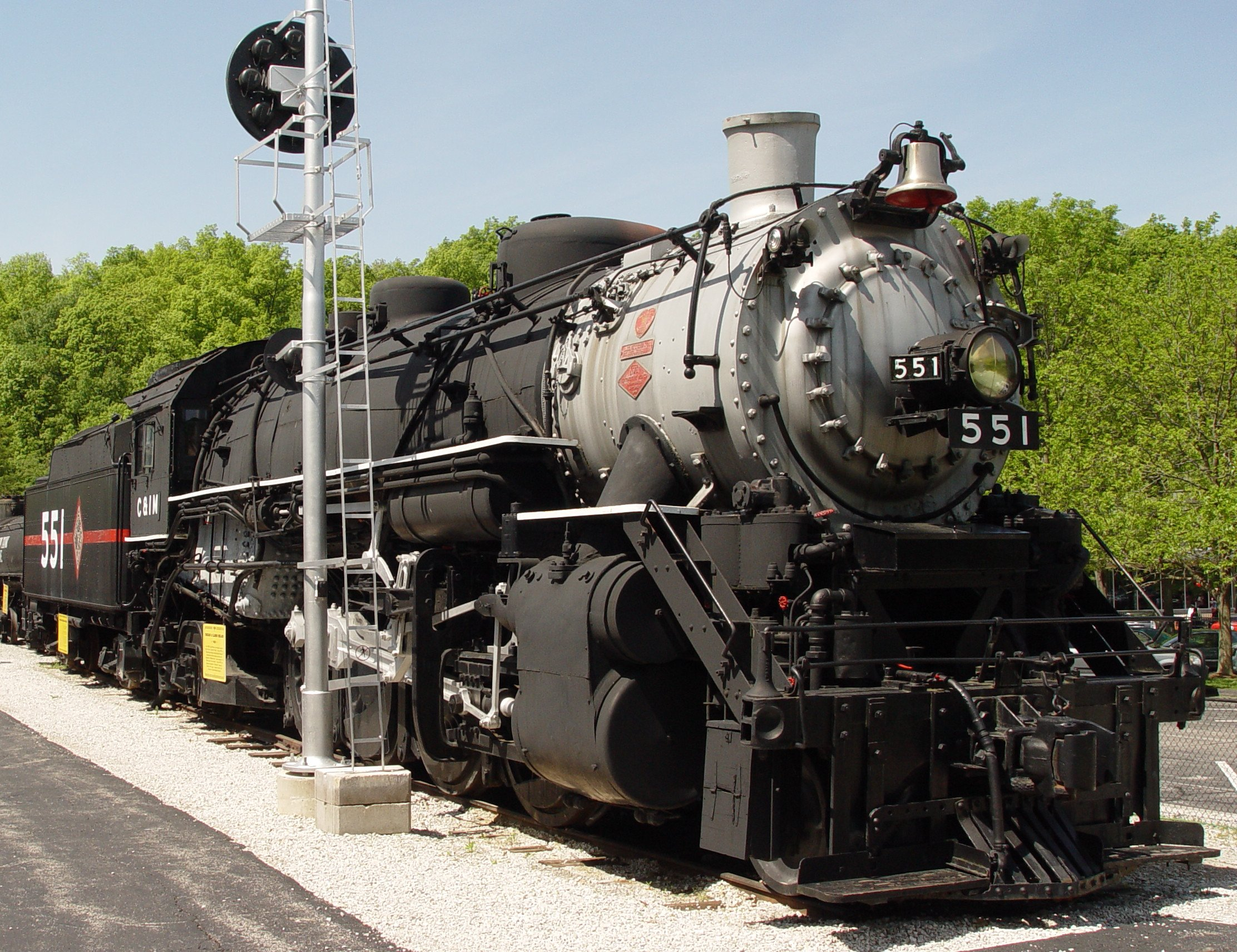
Chicago & Illinois Midland 2-8-2, Number 551, the sole surviving C&IM steam locomotive.

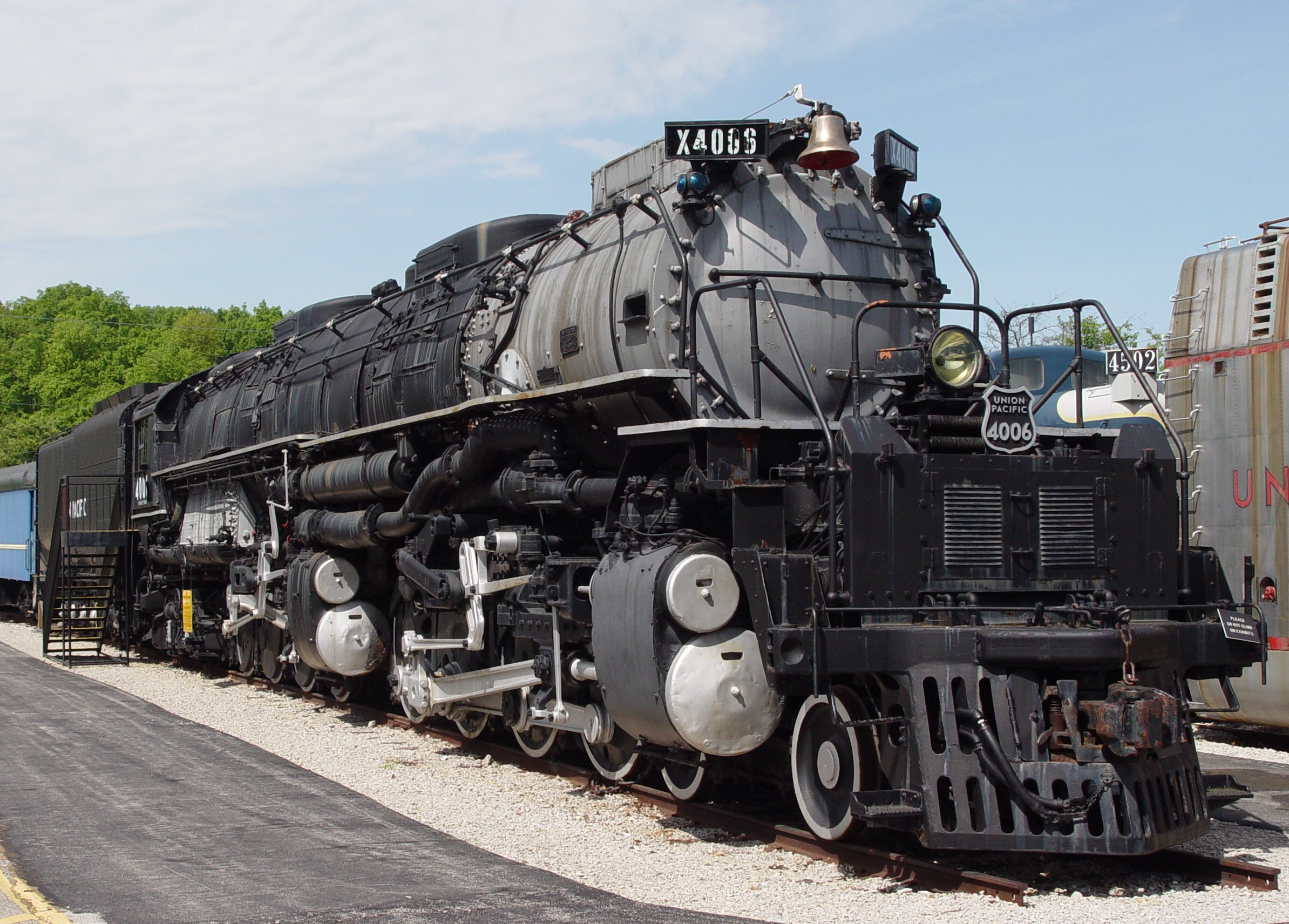
Union Pacific Big Boy Number 4006.

A rare EMD NC Switcher locomotive. Sabine River & Northern Railroad #408.

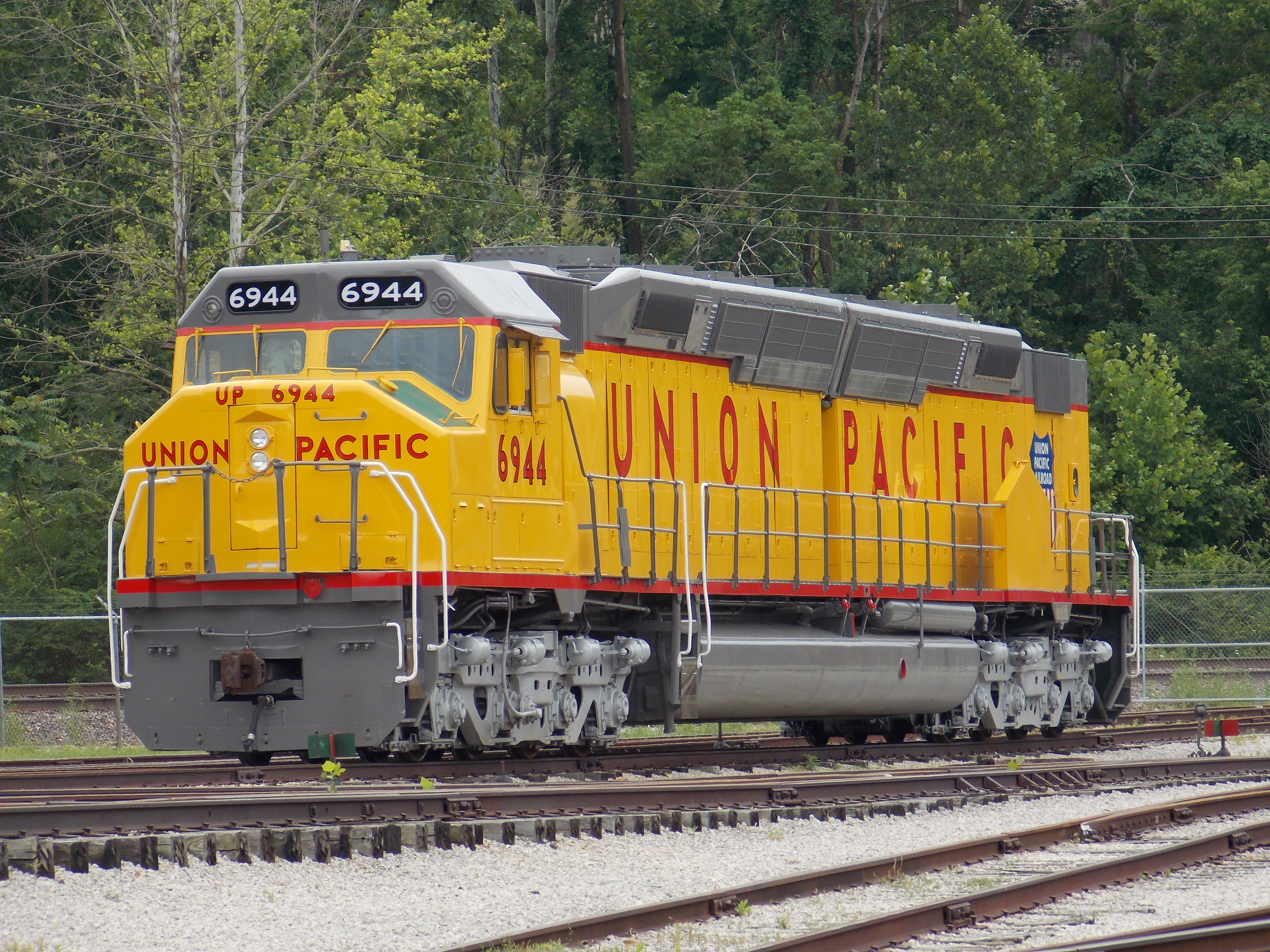
Union Pacific Railroad DD40AX #6944

=== Automobiles ===
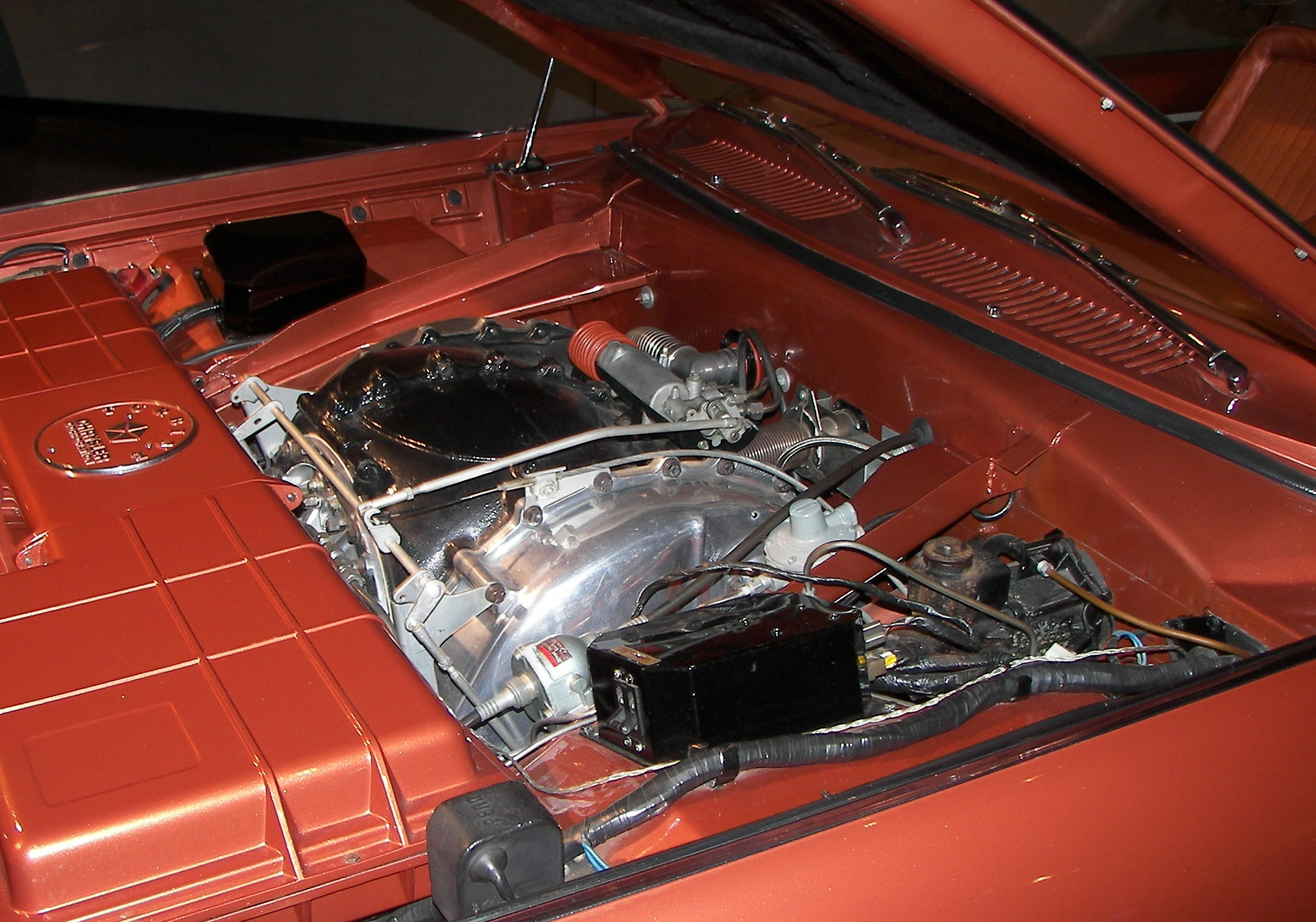
The engine compartment of a 1963 Chrysler Turbine Car displayed inside the museum.

The Earl C. Lindburg Automotive Center contains 25 vehicles, including:

- 1908 Galloway Express truck
- 1901 St. Louis Motor Carriage Company car
- 1963 Chrysler Turbine Car
- 1964½ Ford Mustang
- 1915 Ford Model T
- Bobby Darin's Dream Car a DiDia 150
- St. Louis-built Automobile Gallery.
- 1941 Cadillac Fleetwood Fleetwood Series 60 Special Sedan (featured in front of a rescued and restored unit from the nearby Coral Court Motel

=== Aircraft and boat ===
Aircraft on display at the museum include a C-47 Skytrain at the main gate, a T-33 Shooting Star, and, since 2024, the first production F/A-18 Super Hornet, E1. In late 2025, the museum announced it would add a Harrier jump jet.

In 2021, the museum opened a permanent exhibition of some 100 model airplanes donated by Sanford McDonnell, each with a connection to the McDonnell Aircraft Corporation.

A Missouri River towboat is also on display.

== See also ==
- List of United States railroads
  - List of Missouri railroads
- List of railway museums
