= Even Then =

Single by Micah Tyler

from the album Different
- Released: June 1, 2018
- Recorded: 2017
- Genre: Christian pop
- Length: 3:16
- Label: Fair Trade
- Songwriters: Kyle Lee; Micah Tyler; Tony Wood
- Producer: Tony Wood

Micah Tyler singles chronology
"Different" (2017)	"Even Then" (2018)	"Amen" (2019)

"Even Then" is a song by American Christian music artist Micah Tyler. The song was released as the third single from his 2017 album Different on June 1, 2018. The song peaked at No. 6 on the US Hot Christian Songs chart, becoming his third top 10 single from that chart. It lasted 34 weeks on the overall chart. The song is played in a F♯ minor key, and 75 beats per minute.

== Track listing ==
CD release

1. "Even Then" – 3:16
2. "Even Then(Lead Sheet (Medium Key)" – 3:16
3. "Even Then(Vocal Demonstration)" – 3:14
4. "Even Then(High Key With Background Vocals)" – 3:14
5. "Even Then(High Key Without Background Vocals)" – 3:14
6. "Even Then(Medium Key With Background Vocals)" – 3:14
7. "Even Then(Medium Key Without Background Vocals)" – 3:14
8. "Even Then(Low Key With Background Vocals)" – 3:14
9. "Even Then(Low Key Without Background Vocals)" – 3:14

== Charts ==
=== Weekly charts ===
Chart (2018)	Peak position
US Christian AC (Billboard)	1
US Christian Airplay (Billboard)	3
US Hot Christian Songs (Billboard)	6
US Christian AC Indicator (Billboard)	4

=== Year-end charts ===
Chart (2018)	Peak position
US Christian AC (Billboard)	27
US Christian Airplay (Billboard)	32
US Christian Songs (Billboard)	32

== Certifications ==
Region	Certification	Certified units/sales
United States (RIAA)	Gold	500,000^{‡}
^{‡} Sales+streaming figures based on certification alone.
