= Buna, Texas =

- Census-designated place
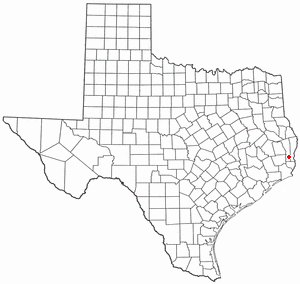
- Location of Buna, Texas

- Coordinates: 30°26′45″N 93°57′45″W
- Country: United States
- State: Texas
- County: Jasper

Area
  - Total: 6.02 sq mi (15.58 km^{2})
  - Land: 6.01 sq mi (15.57 km^{2})
  - Water: 0.0039 sq mi (0.01 km^{2})
- Elevation: 79 ft (24 m)

Population (2020)
  - Total: 2,137
  - Density: 356/sq mi (137.6/km^{2})
- Time zone: UTC-6 (Central (CST))
  - Summer (DST): UTC-5 (CDT)
- ZIP code: 77612
- Area code: 409
- FIPS code: 48-11236
- GNIS feature ID: 2407921

Buna (/ˈbjuːnə/ BEW-nə) is an unincorporated community and census-designated place (CDP) in Jasper County, Texas, United States. The population was 2,137 at the 2020 census.

== History ==
The Beaumont Lumber Company mill in southern Jasper County was first called "Carrolla" for the Carroll family, prominent Beaumont lumbermen and industrialists. The site was subsequently renamed "Buna", however, in honor of one of the family's cousins, Buna Corley.

== Geography ==
Buna is located in southern Jasper County. U.S. Route 96 runs along the west side of the community, leading north 16 miles (26 km) to Kirbyville and 35 miles (56 km) to Jasper, the county seat. US-96 leads southwest from Buna 9 miles (14 km) to Evadale and 35 miles (56 km) to Beaumont. Texas State Highway 62 leads southeast 17 miles (27 km) to Mauriceville.

According to the United States Census Bureau, the Buna CDP has a total area of 6.0 square miles (15.6 km^{2}), of which 0.004 square miles (0.01 km^{2}), or 0.08%, are water. The community sits on a low watershed divide, with the west side of town draining to the Neches River and the east side draining to the Sabine River.

== Demographics ==
Historical population
Census	Pop.	Note	%±
1970	1,649		—
1980	2,093		26.9%
1990	2,127		1.6%
2000	2,269		6.7%
2010	2,142		−5.6%
2020	2,137		−0.2%
U.S. Decennial Census; 1850–1900 1910; 1920 1930 1940; 1950 1960 1970; 1980 1990 2000; 2010 2020; As Besmay-Buna in the 1970 and 1980 Census

First listed as an unincorporated place which included Bessmay in the 1970 U.S. census and appeared as the Bessmay-Buna census designated place in the 1980 United States census. In the 1990 U.S. census the CDP was renamed the Buna CDP.

=== 2020 census ===
Buna CDP, Texas – Racial and ethnic composition Note: the US Census treats Hispanic/Latino as an ethnic category. This table excludes Latinos from the racial categories and assigns them to a separate category. Hispanics/Latinos may be of any race.
Race / Ethnicity (NH = Non-Hispanic)	Pop 2000	Pop 2010	Pop 2020	% 2000	% 2010	% 2020
White alone (NH)	1,939	1,865	1,719	85.46%	87.07%	80.44%
Black or African American alone (NH)	258	155	228	11.37%	7.24%	10.67%
Native American or Alaska Native alone (NH)	10	8	0	0.44%	0.37%	0.00%
Asian alone (NH)	3	9	6	0.13%	0.42%	0.28%
Native Hawaiian or Pacific Islander alone (NH)	2	1	0	0.09%	0.05%	0.00%
Other race alone (NH)	1	0	5	0.04%	0.00%	0.23%
Mixed race or Multiracial (NH)	22	38	80	0.97%	1.77%	3.74%
Hispanic or Latino (any race)	34	66	99	1.50%	3.08%	4.63%
Total	2,269	2,142	2,137	100.00%	100.00%	100.00%

As of the 2020 United States census, there were 2,137 people, 802 households, and 557 families residing in the CDP.

As of the census of 2000, there were 2,269 people, 865 households, and 626 families residing in the CDP. The population density was 381.4 inhabitants per square mile (147.3/km^{2}). There were 956 housing units at an average density of 160.7 per square mile (62.0/km^{2}). The racial makeup of the CDP was 86.16% White, 11.37% African American, 0.44% Native American, 0.13% Asian, 0.09% Pacific Islander, 0.71% from other races, and 1.10% from two or more races. Hispanic or Latino of any race were 1.50% of the population.

There were 865 households, out of which 35.3% had children under the age of 18 living with them, 58.4% were married couples living together, 11.6% had a female householder with no husband present, and 27.6% were non-families. 25.7% of all households were made up of individuals, and 11.1% had someone living alone who was 65 years of age or older. The average household size was 2.57 and the average family size was 3.07.

In the CDP, the population was spread out, with 26.3% under the age of 18, 10.0% from 18 to 24, 26.8% from 25 to 44, 23.0% from 45 to 64, and 13.9% who were 65 years of age or older. The median age was 36 years. For every 100 females, there were 87.7 males. For every 100 females age 18 and over, there were 86.1 males.

The median income for a household in the CDP was $29,611, and the median income for a family was $33,952. Males had a median income of $29,766 versus $20,848 for females. The per capita income for the CDP was $13,999. About 10.2% of families and 11.9% of the population were below the poverty line, including 12.1% of those under age 18 and 11.2% of those age 65 or over.

== Notable people ==
- Mark Nesler, country music singer-songwriter who grew up in Buna
- Micah Tyler, Christian singer, songwriter

== Education ==
Buna is served by the Buna Independent School District, and is home to the Buna High School Cougars.
