= Micah Tyler =

- Born: Beaumont, Texas, U.S.
- Origin: Buna, Texas, U.S.
- Genre: Christian pop
- Occupations: Singer, songwriter
- Instruments: Vocals; guitar
- Years active: 2013–present
- Label: Fair Trade
- Website: micahtyler.com

Micah Tyler is an American Christian musician, who primarily plays Christian pop music. He has released four musical works: two studio albums, The Story I Tell (2013) and New Today (2020), and two extended plays, The Kitchen Sink (2014) and Different (2016) with Fair Trade Services. Both the Different album and the New Today album charted on one Billboard magazine chart.

== Early life and background ==
He became a youth pastor after graduating from high school at the age of eighteen. He also drove a food delivery truck for his father-in-law’s business before turning to music full time.

== Music career ==
His music recording career started in 2013, with the studio album, The Story I Tell, while he also independently released an extended play the following year, The Kitchen Sink. In 2015, he had his first viral video with his performance of an original satirical song, "You've Gotta Love Millennials." The video received tens of millions of views within days across Facebook and YouTube. Tyler released another extended play, Different, with Fair Trade Services, on November 4, 2016, while this peaked on the Billboard magazine Christian Albums chart at No. 38.

In 2020, Tyler released "New Today," a full length album which reached No. 25 on the Billboard Magazine Christian Albums chart.

== Personal life ==
Tyler is married to Casey Begnaud, and together they have three children. They reside in Buna, Texas.

== Discography ==
=== Studio albums ===
List of albums, with chart positions
Title	Album details	Peak chart positions	
Title	Album details	US Christ	US Heat
The Story I Tell	Released: October 8, 2013; Label: Independent	—	—
Different	Released: October 20, 2017; Label: Fair Trade; Format: CD, download	23	8
New Today	Releasing: April 24, 2020; Label: Fair Trade; Format: CD, download	25	—

=== Compilations ===
Title	Album details	Included
Old Stuff	Label: Independent	The Story I Tell; The Kitchen Sink (EP)
The Bootleg Record	Label: Fair Trade	The Story I Tell; The Kitchen Sink (EP)

=== EPs ===
List of EPs, with chart positions
Title	Album details	Peak chart positions
Title	Album details	US Christ
The Kitchen Sink	Released: October 7, 2014; Label: Independent	—
Different – EP	Released: November 4, 2016; Label: Fair Trade; Format: CD, download	24
People Like Us	Released: March 24, 2023; Label: Fair Trade/Columbia; Format: CD, download	—

=== Singles ===
Title	Year	Peak chart positions						Certifications	Album
Title	Year	US Digital	US Christ.	US Christ. Air	US Christ. AC	US Christ. Digital	AUS Christ.	Certifications	Album
"Never Been A Moment"	2016	—	6	2	3	16	—		Different
"Different"	2017	—	7	6	3	6	—	RIAA: Gold	Different
"Even Then"	2018	—	6	3	1	10	—	RIAA: Gold	Different
"Amen"	2019	—	9	2	3	—	—		New Today
"New Today"	2020	—	40	31	—	—	—		New Today
"Feels Like Joy"	2020	—	—	—	—	—	—		Non-album single
"Walking Free"	2021	—	13	6	5	—	—		New Today
"I See Grace"	2022	—	7	1	3	—	—		People Like Us
"Praise The Lord"	2023	—	8	1	1	—	—		People Like Us
"God Did It"	2025	—	22	3	3	—	—		Non-album singles
"Perfectly"	2026	12	13	6	2	1	1		Non-album singles

=== Promotional singles ===
Title	Year	Album
"Welcome to the Family"	2020	New Today

== Awards and nominations ==
Year	Organization	Nominee/work	Category	Result	Ref.
2012	Immerse Conference	Himself	National Male Vocalist of the Year	Won	
2016	We Love Awards	Different (EP)	EP of the Year	Won	
2017	GMA Dove Awards	Himself	New Artist of the Year	Nominated	
2018	GMA Dove Awards	"Different"	Song of the Year	Nominated	
2018	K-Love Fan Awards	"Different"	Breakout Single of the Year	Nominated	
2020	We Love Awards	New Today	Pop/Contemporary Album of the Year	Nominated	
2022	BMI Christan Music Awards	"Amen"	BMI Song Award	Won	
2025	We Love Awards	"God Did It"	Contemporary Song of the Year	Won	
