= Bessmay, Texas =

Unincorporated community in Texas, US

Coordinates: 30°27′46″N 93°57′12″W

Bessmay is an unincorporated community in eastern Jasper County, in the U.S. state of Texas. The community is on County Road 640, approximately one half mile east of U.S. Route 96. The community of Buna lies approximately 1.3 miles to the south-southwest.

== History ==
Bessmay began in about 1900 as a lumbering town on the railroad. The community was named for Bessmay Kirby, the daughter of a sawmill owner.
