= Evadale, Texas =

Unincorporated community in Jasper County

- Census-designated place
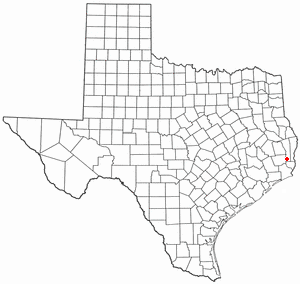
- Location of Evadale, Texas

- Coordinates: 30°21′20″N 94°02′43″W
- Country: United States
- State: Texas
- County: Jasper

Area
  - Total: 17.7 sq mi (45.8 km^{2})
  - Land: 17.0 sq mi (44.1 km^{2})
  - Water: 0.66 sq mi (1.7 km^{2})
- Elevation: 43 ft (13 m)

Population (2020)
  - Total: 1,246
  - Density: 87/sq mi (33.6/km^{2})
- Time zone: UTC-6 (Central (CST))
  - Summer (DST): UTC-5 (CDT)
- ZIP code: 77615
- Area code: 409
- FIPS code: 48-24840
- GNIS feature ID: 2408094

Evadale is an unincorporated community and census-designated place (CDP) in Jasper County, Texas, United States. The population was 1,246 at the 2020 census.

== Geography ==
Evadale is located in southern Jasper County and is bordered to the west by the Neches River, which forms the Hardin County line.

U.S. Route 96 passes through the community, leading northeast 9 miles (14 km) to Buna and west 6 miles (10 km) to Silsbee. Farther afield, Jasper is 43 miles (69 km) north via US-96, and Beaumont is 26 miles (42 km) to the southwest.

According to the United States Census Bureau, the Evadale CDP has a total area of 17.7 square miles (45.8 km^{2}), of which 17.0 square miles (44.1 km^{2}) are land and 0.66 square miles (1.7 km^{2}), or 3.78%, are water.

=== Climate ===
The climate in this area is characterized by hot, humid summers and generally mild to cool winters. According to the Köppen Climate Classification system, Evadale has a humid subtropical climate, abbreviated "Cfa" on climate maps.

== Demographics ==
Historical population
Census	Pop.	Note	%±
1980	1,601		—
1990	1,422		−11.2%
2000	1,430		0.6%
2010	1,483		3.7%
2020	1,246		−16.0%
U.S. Decennial Census; 1850–1900 1910; 1920 1930 1940; 1950 1960 1970; 1980 1990 2000; 2010

Evadale was first listed as a census designated place in the 1980 United States census.

=== 2020 census ===
Evadale CDP, Texas – Racial and ethnic composition Note: the US Census treats Hispanic/Latino as an ethnic category. This table excludes Latinos from the racial categories and assigns them to a separate category. Hispanics/Latinos may be of any race.
Race / Ethnicity (NH = Non-Hispanic)	Pop 2000	Pop 2010	Pop 2020	% 2000	% 2010	% 2020
White alone (NH)	1,398	1,434	1,135	97.76%	96.70%	91.09%
Black or African American alone (NH)	0	2	6	0.00%	0.13%	0.48%
Native American or Alaska Native alone (NH)	1	2	4	0.07%	0.13%	0.32%
Asian alone (NH)	0	0	5	0.00%	0.00%	0.40%
Native Hawaiian or Pacific Islander alone (NH)	0	0	0	0.00%	0.00%	0.00%
Other race alone (NH)	0	0	0	0.00%	0.00%	0.00%
Mixed race or Multiracial (NH)	5	12	48	0.35%	0.81%	3.85%
Hispanic or Latino (any race)	26	33	48	1.82%	2.23%	3.85%
Total	1,430	1,483	1,246	100.00%	100.00%	100.00%

As of the 2020 United States census, there were 1,246 people, 555 households, and 374 families residing in the CDP.

As of the census of 2000, there were 1,430 people, 537 households, and 407 families residing in the CDP. The population density was 83.9 inhabitants per square mile (32.4/km^{2}). There were 591 housing units at an average density of 34.7 per square mile (13.4/km^{2}). The racial makeup of the CDP was 98.95% White, 0.07% Native American, 0.42% from other races, and 0.56% from two or more races. Hispanic or Latino of any race were 1.82% of the population.

There were 537 households, out of which 36.5% had children under the age of 18 living with them, 64.2% were married couples living together, 8.8% had a female householder with no husband present, and 24.2% were non-families. 20.9% of all households were made up of individuals, and 9.5% had someone living alone who was 65 years of age or older. The average household size was 2.66 and the average family size was 3.10.

In the CDP, the population was spread out, with 29.1% under the age of 18, 8.0% from 18 to 24, 28.3% from 25 to 44, 22.5% from 45 to 64, and 12.1% who were 65 years of age or older. The median age was 34 years. For every 100 females, there were 95.4 males. For every 100 females age 18 and over, there were 92.8 males.

The median income for a household in the CDP was $30,781, and the median income for a family was $36,813. Males had a median income of $33,438 versus $18,333 for females. The per capita income for the CDP was $13,906. About 12.7% of families and 15.6% of the population were below the poverty line, including 19.7% of those under age 18 and 11.8% of those age 65 or over.

== Education ==
Most of the CDP is in the Evadale Independent School District and the other is in the Buna Independent School District.

Evadale ISD is home to the Evadale High School Rebels. The Evadale district made news in June 2015 for refusing to change their Confederate Flag-inspired crest despite pressure to do so.
