= History of Sulzer diesel engines =

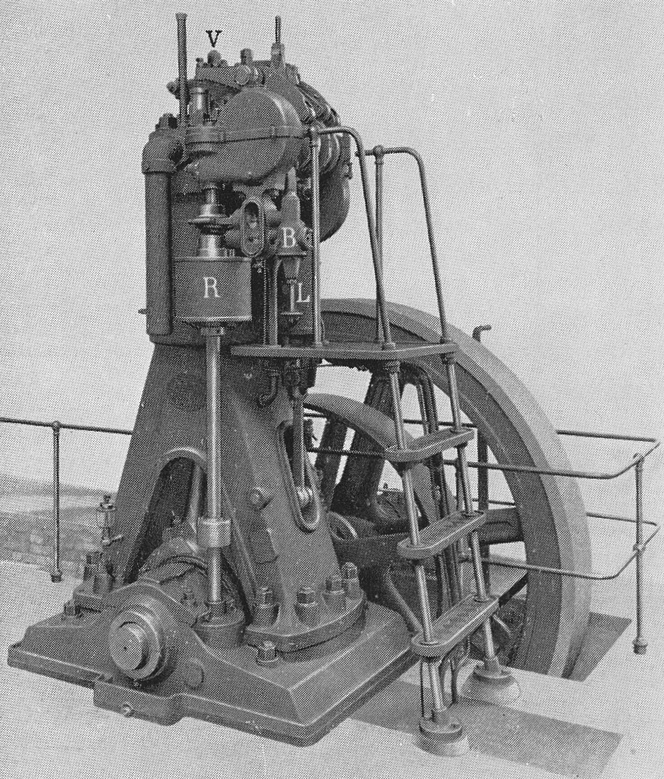
Sulzer diesel engine of 1898

This article covers the History of Sulzer diesel engines from 1898 to 1997. Sulzer Brothers foundry was established in Winterthur, Switzerland, in 1834 by Johann Jakob Sulzer-Neuffert and his two sons, Johann Jakob and Salomon. Products included cast iron, firefighting pumps and textile machinery. Rudolf Diesel was educated in Augsburg and Munich and his works training was with Sulzer, and his later co-operation with Sulzer led to the construction of the first Sulzer diesel engine in 1898. In 2015, the Sulzer company lives on but it no longer manufactures diesel engines, having sold the diesel engine business to Wärtsilä in 1997.

== Overview ==
Sulzer built diesel engines for stationary, road, rail and marine use. The engine types usually comprise a number, then some letters, then another number. For example, 6LDA28 indicates a six-cylinder engine in the "LDA" series with a 28 cm cylinder bore.

== Road ==
In 1937, Sulzer introduced an opposed piston two-stroke diesel engine for road use. This used a single crank with con-rods operating levers that moved the opposed pistons, the same layout as the 1905 Arrol-Johnston petrol engine. The post-war Commer TS3 was similar but the Sulzer had a piston-type blower instead of a Roots blower. It was made in two sizes: 69 mm bore x 101.6 mm stroke or 89 mm bore by 120 mm stroke. The smaller version had two cylinders, produced 35 hp, and was intended for tractors. The larger version was available with two, three or four cylinders and was intended for trucks.

== Rail ==
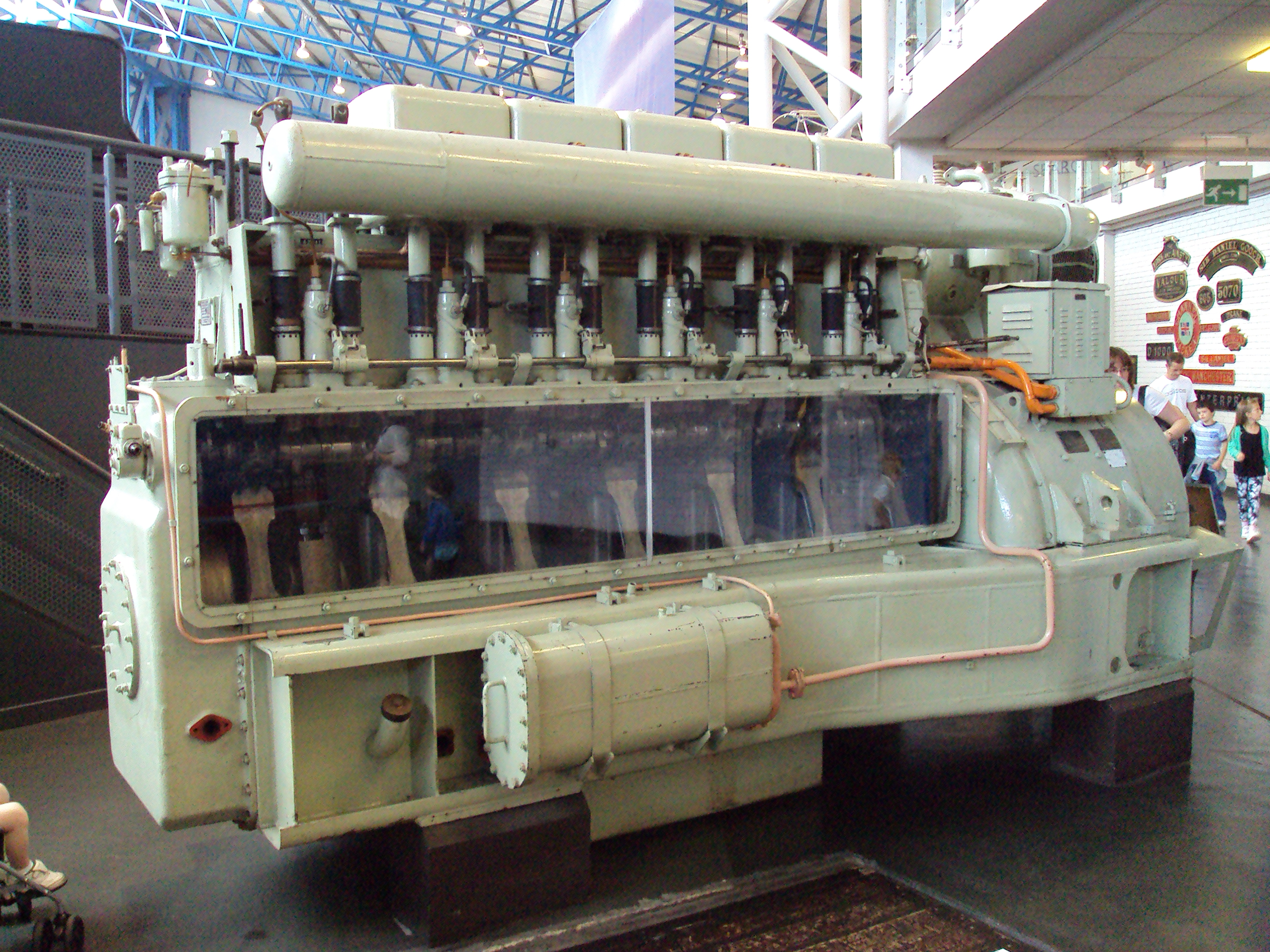
Sulzer diesel engine from a railway locomotive at the National Railway Museum, York, England

Sulzer supplied the main and auxiliary engines for a large diesel locomotive built by A. Borsig of Berlin in 1912, the first large locomotive of its kind. Like many modern diesels this had a cab at each end, and the Sulzer 4LV38 two-stroke diesel engine (of 1,200 bhp) could be run in either direction of rotation. Transmission was direct from the transverse crankshaft via coupling rods to the two driving axles. A Sulzer auxiliary engine provided the air for starting. In tests in 1913 on the Faunfeld-Winterthur line where express steam took 21 minutes, this did it in 17 minutes. The direct drive was a problem; starting the engine meant starting the locomotive and its load moving, requiring a lot of compressed air.

Sulzer moved to a range of smaller locomotive engines and including railcars in the 1920s, but in the mid-1930s they came out with their LD series designed just for railway locomotives which they would produce for many years. The top of this range (in 1945) was the 12LDA31, which was a 12-cylinder engine with two parallel crankshafts geared together, effectively two straight 6 engines in a common crankcase. These were 2-stroke engines with four blowers, each serving three cylinders. In 1945 the engines were in use in France and Romania, and their output of 2,200 bhp at 700 rpm placed them as one of the most powerful locomotive engines at the time.

There was also an LVA range of V-format locomotive engines from 1960. 12LVA24 versions of these engines were installed in D1702-D1706 in the UK, but there were some reliability problems. The locomotives were reverted to the LDA engine. The refurbished 12LVA24 engines were sold to SNCF. At the end of the 1960s the Sulzer traction division was merged into the far larger marine division. Some examples of Sulzer powered rail locomotives:

Large numbers of Sulzer-engined locomotives were supplied to rail companies all over the world, particularly using the LDA engine.

=== Type LDA28 ===
Example applications, 6 cylinders

- British Rail Class 24
- British Rail Class 25
- British Rail Class 26
- British Rail Class 27
- CIE 101 Class
- CIE 113 Class
- Commonwealth Railways NSU class
- Commonwealth Railways NT class

Example applications, 8 cylinders

- British Rail Class 33

Example applications, 12 cylinders

- British Rail Class 44
- British Rail Class 45
- British Rail Class 46
- British Rail Class 47
- SNCF Class CC 65500
- PKP class ST43 (manufacturer type: LDE 1200)

=== Type LVA24 ===
Example applications, 12 cylinders

- British Rail Class 48
- SNCF Class A1AA1A 68000

Example applications, 16 cylinders

- British Rail HS4000

=== Type LV31 ===
Example applications, 8 cylinders

- Russian locomotive class E el-8

== Marine ==
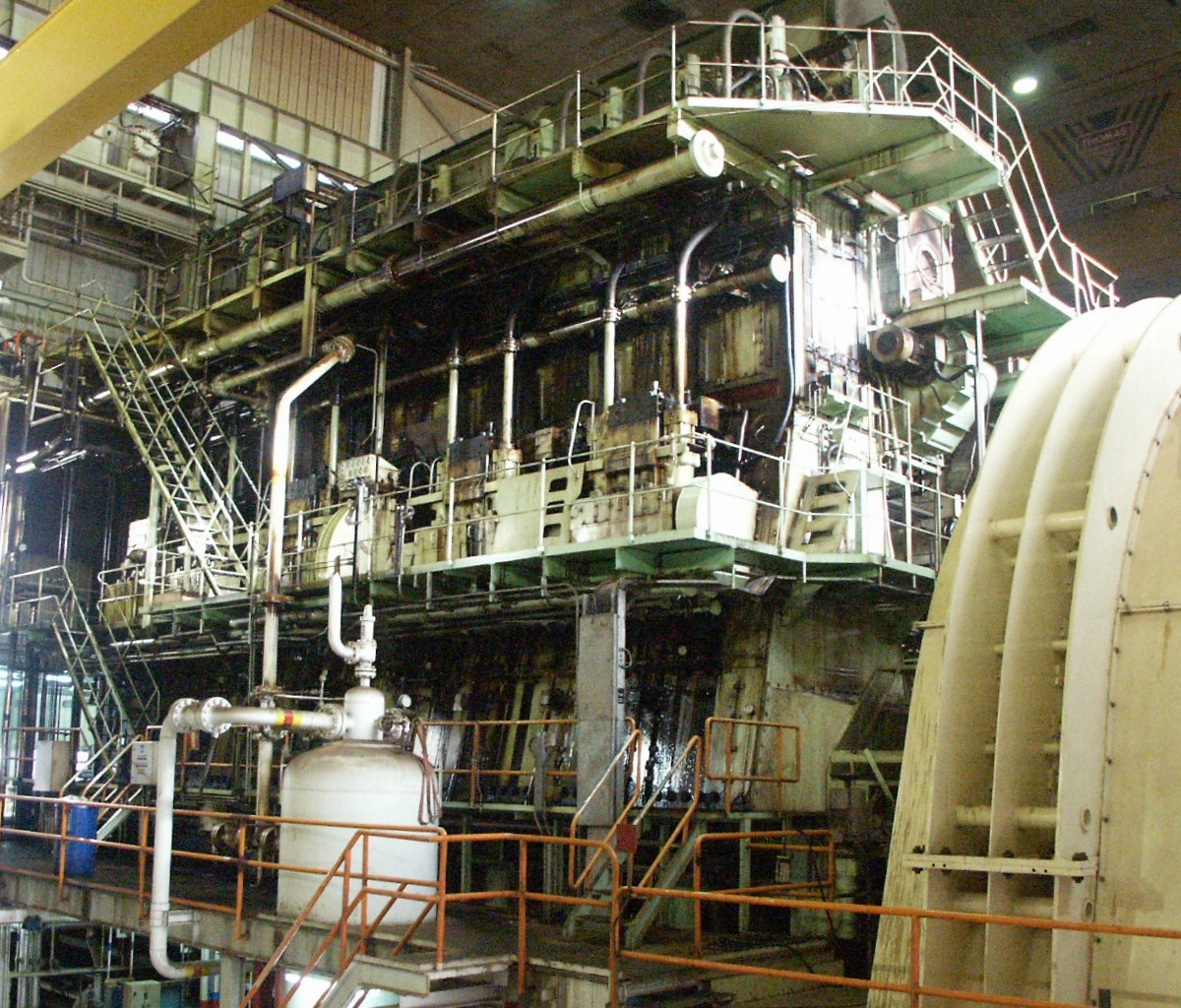
Sulzer 9RTA76

Sulzer marine engines were well engineered and so various trials in the early days of oil engines paid dividends. In 1910 there was an icebreaker tug equipped with a Sulzer diesel at Hamburg. The 4 cylinder two-stroke diesel engine gave an indicated 210 bhp and 9.75 knots, had a 1/3rd smaller engine room than the steam equivalent, and the engine weighed just a quarter of the equivalent steam plant. It did well in all trials, and the simple controls meant the engine could be reversed faster than a steam engine.

In 1911 the British Admiralty purchased a diesel motor launch they had been evaluating for some time. By Sulzer standards this had a very small 4-cylinder two-stroke engine of just 100 bhp. The boat was only 60 foot long, and as part of its trials the engine had been successfully run on full power for a period of 24 hours, reaching over 10 knots. The vessel was bought for £3,000 to be the subject for further experimental work.

The MV Monte Penedo, Germany's first sea-going motor ship (in 1912), was fitted with two Sulzer 4S47 two-stroke crosshead diesel engines. These were replaced in 1949 with new Sulzer 7TS36 diesel engines. In 1912 Sulzer also provided the main diesel propulsion engine and the two diesel generator engines on the new outer Elbe lightship, the 'Burgermeister Oswald'.

The US Navy also chose Sulzer for some of their submarines, following discussions held in Switzerland in 1915, a design for submarines was developed and tested. These were built by the Lake Torpedo Boat company as the US L Class, and the engines involved the US licensee Busch-Sulzer. Sulzer licensed their engine builds to many companies worldwide, without apparent compromise to the quality of their engines.

In the mid-1920s Sulzer started to advertise their airless Diesel engines, meaning they were using liquid injection rather than injecting the fuel using an air-blast (as used by Rudolph Diesel). They exhibited their 300hp 2-stroke airless engine, suitable for yachts, tugs, barges, etc. at the Olympia Shipping Exhibition of 1925.

Sulzer's marine engine range in 1969 extended from the 3 cylinder version of the A25 auxiliary engine at 550 bhp to the 12 cylinder 48,000 bhp 12RND105 engine, 10 metres high, with cylinders over a metre in diameter. More recently these main engines have been replaced by the RTA series of engines, still two stroke.

The RD type marine two-stroke cross-head engine ranged from the 5 cylinder 5RD44, to the 12 cylinder 12RD90. This was developed into the RND engine, with numerous improvements including eliminating mechanically operated exhaust valves, with sizes ranging from 5RND68 (8,250 bhp), to 12RND105 (48,000 bhp).

A new marine range of engines in the later 1960s were the Z and ZV range covering 2,600 bhp to 6,600 bhp. These were again two-strokes but in 1969 four-stroke version were being planned. They were available either as in-line engines or as 50 degree V-engines. Trunk pistons were used instead of crossheads, and both long and short stroke engines were available.

One Sulzer diesel engine still keeps the 1960 icebreaker Thor III in Drammen, Norway, operational. The icebreaker is at work in January, 2026.

These are examples, not a full list.

=== Type RTA76 ===
Example applications, 5 cylinders

- USNS Paul Buck (T-AOT-1122)

Example applications, 8 cylinders

- MV Rena

=== Type TADS56 ===
Example applications, 5 cylinders

- Galați-class cargo ship

== Stationary ==
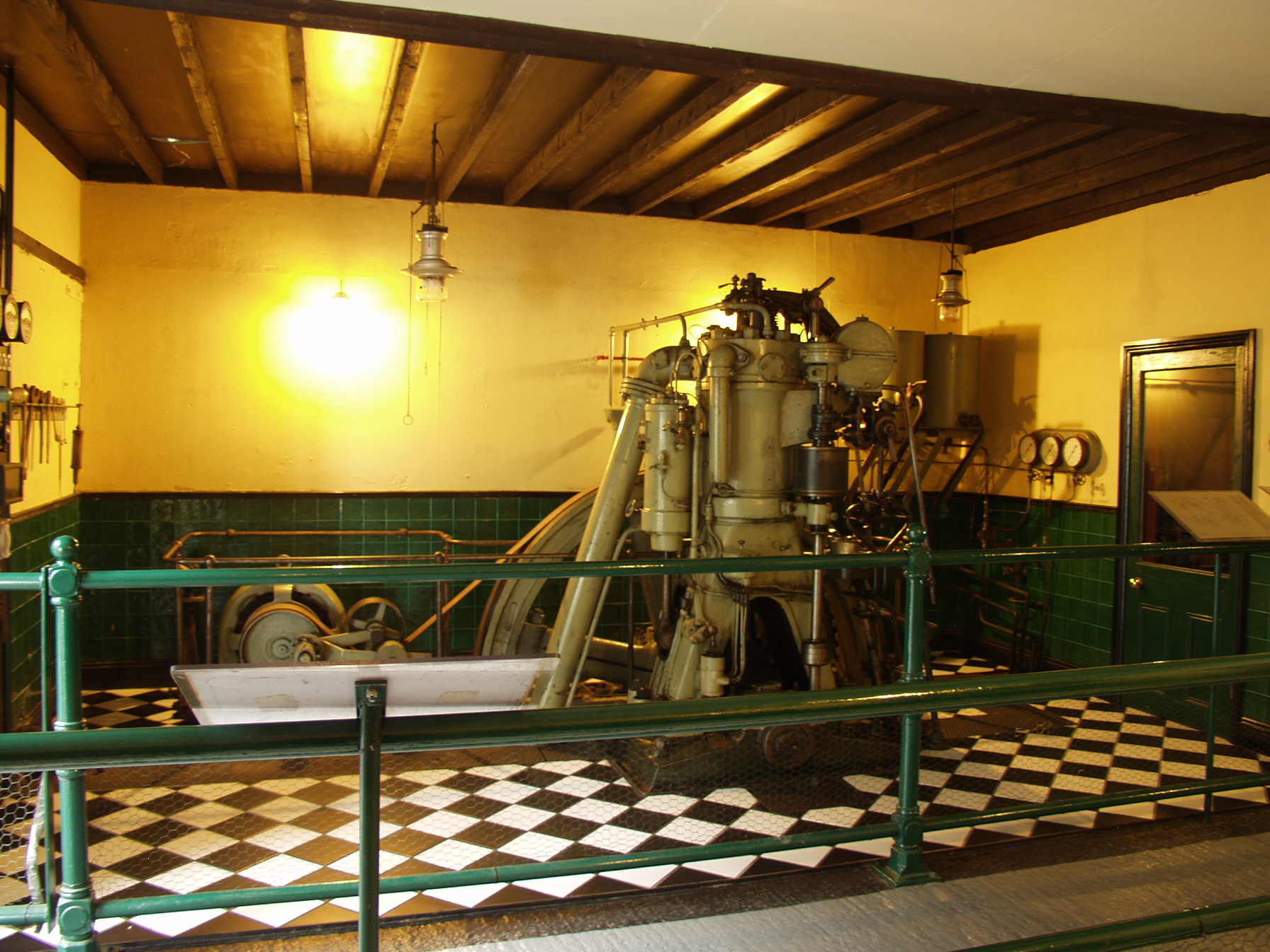
Sulzer diesel engine of 1912 at the Internal Fire – Museum of Power in Wales

While Sulzer was well known for its two-stroke engines, in 1931 there was a brief resume of their four stroke diesel engines which had been built alongside the two stroke engines. In 1903 they offered four stroke low speed A-frame style engines from 20 to 800 hp. Enquiries for lighter high-speed engines led by 1911 to forced lubrication four-stroke engines built with closed box-frames, low set camshafts and pushrod valve operation. The airless (injection) four-stroke engines were then developed from this type and by 1931 were available with from 2 to 8 cylinders with DD engine designation.

At the start of 1912 it was claimed that the largest diesel engines built for stationary work (of 2,000 and 2,400 bhp) were built by Sulzers, though this had been surpassed by an order received by Sulzers for four 4,000 hp 6-cylinder engines from Chile for electricity generation. These two-stroke crosshead engines were described as being basically the same as their marine engines without the reversing gear. In 1915 a 4,500 bhp engine was installed at Harland & Wolfe, Belfast. This installation had been delayed due to the war complicating commercial arrangements. A second engine of the same size had been installed at a Zurich electricity works, and another was being installed at a French electricity station - the engines were described as being "identical in essential principles and also external construction with large marine engines by the same firm".

Sulzer could provide engines from 550 bhp upwards for electricity generation, pumping plant, and industrial applications. These designs were essentially versions of their wide range of marine engines, although without the thrust block, and normally without the reversing gear.

The stationary versions of the marine RD and RND crosshead range were designated RF and RNF, but Z engines and the A25/AL25 auxiliary engine were designated for either marine or industrial use. The AL25 wasa higher output version of the A25 developed for emergency generating sets.

Examples : Two twin cylinder engines at King Edward Mine, Camborne(http://kingedwardmine.co.uk/) They were originally installed for the Falmouth Water Company around 1926/27, one of them was kept as standby until the early 1970s. King Edward Mine removed the engines in 1989 and erected the better one at KEM around 1994.

== Licences ==
Licences to build diesel engines to Sulzer's design were granted to Vickers-Armstrongs, and George Clark of Sunderland (after WW2), Wallsend Slipway and Engineering Co (c1925) in the United Kingdom; to Busch-Sulzer in the United States, to Reșița works in Romania, to Messrs Werkspoor in Holland, to Messrs. Workman, Clark and Company Ltd of Ireland, to Mitsubish Heavy Industries in Japan, and to H. Cegielski – Poznań in Poland.

A new Vickers-Armstrong licence in 1957 also allowed associates of the licensee, Cockatoo Docks and Engineering Co Pty Ltd of Sydney, Australia and Canadian Vickers Ltd of Montreal, Canada, to build Sulzer engines under licence.
