= Belgian State Railways Type 10 =

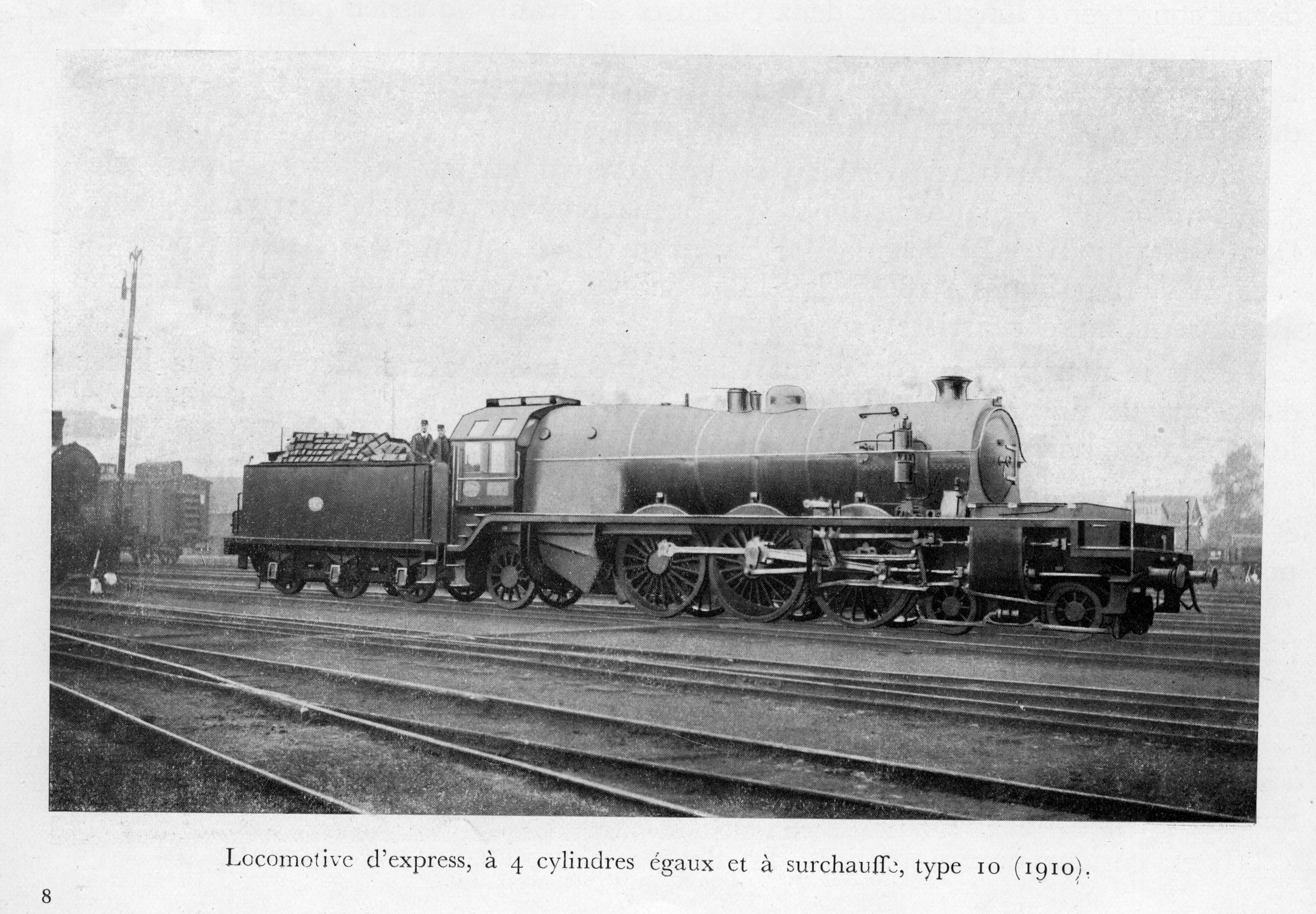
- Belgian State Railways Type 10
Type and origin
- Power type: Steam
- Builder: John Cockerill & Cie. (10); Société Anglo-Franco-Belge (17); Saint-Léonard (1); Zimmerman & Hanrez (8); La Meuse (7); FUF Haine-Saint-Pierre (4); La Hestre (5); Tubize (6)
- Build date: 1910–1914
- Total produced: 58
Specifications
- Configuration
  - Whyte: 4-6-2
  - UIC: 2′C1 h4S
- Gauge: 1,435 mm (4 ft 8 1/2 in) standard gauge
- Driver dia.: 1,980 mm (77.95 in)
- Wheelbase: 11,425 mm (449.80 in)
- Loco weight: 92 tonnes (90.5 long tons; 101.4 short tons)
- Firebox
  - Grate area: 5 m^{2} (54 sq ft)
- Boiler pressure: 14 atm (1.42 MPa; 206 psi)
- Heating surface: 240 m^{2} (2,600 sq ft)
- Superheater
  - Heating area: 62 m^{2} (670 sq ft)
- Cylinders: Four
- Cylinder size: 500 mm × 660 mm (19.69 in × 25.98 in)
Career
- Operators: Belgian State Railways; NMBS/SNCB
- Class: Type 10
- Numbers: 4501–4558; 1000–1048; 10.001–10.049
- Withdrawn: 1956–1959
- Preserved: One: 10.018
- Disposition: One preserved, remainder scrapped

The Belgian State Railways Type 10, later known as the NMBS/SNCB Type 10, was a class of 4-6-2 steam locomotives built between 1910 and 1914.

The class was used to work express trains operated by the Belgian State Railways and its successor, the National Railway Company of Belgium (NMBS/SNCB), which was established in 1926.

The locomotives were noteworthy for their unusually short boiler, which ended behind all four cylinders. This was due to the class sharing the boiler design with the Type 36 2-10-0 freight design, and the 2-10-0's weight limitations determined the length of the boiler.

There were two sub-types of the Type 10:

- The first 29 engines were the most powerful; they mostly ran over hilly main lines, including the tough Luxembourg line between Brussels, Namur, Arlon and Luxembourg City
- The last 29 were slightly lighter and had a smaller firebox; they were intended for easier lines, including the level line between Brussels and Ostend.

Despite these differences, the last sub-type was used extensively, on the Luxembourg line. Some type 10, captured by the Germans in World War I; several damaged or worn out engines were cannibalized for spares and scrapped during the occupation of Belgium. After the war, between the 1920s and the 1940s the surviving type 10 were gradually upgraded with new superheaters, Legein or Kylchap dual exhaust, ACFI feedwater heather, smoke lifters, duplex air pumps, larger tenders borrowed from war reparation locomotives.

Despite being newer and fitted with a very large firebox, the new Type 1 Pacific, built in 1935, could not outperform the old Type 10, especially on steep inclines. The Type 5 Mikado, built in 1930 for the heaviest trains on the Luxembourg line, had many shortcomings and failed to replace the Type 10 as well.

The class was withdrawn in 1956 when the Luxembourg line was electrified but four Type 10 were displaced to Brussels South and used, until 1959, along with Type 1.

One member of the class, No. 10.018, has been preserved by the NMBS/SNCB for display at Train World, the Belgian national railway museum.

== See also ==
- History of rail transport in Belgium
- List of SNCB/NMBS classes
- Rail transport in Belgium
- L&YR 2-10-0 (Hughes), a British locomotive design, inspired by Flamme's work
