= Brush Type 4 =

Brush Type 4 may refer to:

- British Rail Class 47
- British Rail Class 48
