= 48 class =

48 class or Class 48 may refer to:

- British Rail Class 48
- New South Wales 48 class locomotive
