= SNCF Class A1AA1A 68500 =

Class of French diesel locomotives

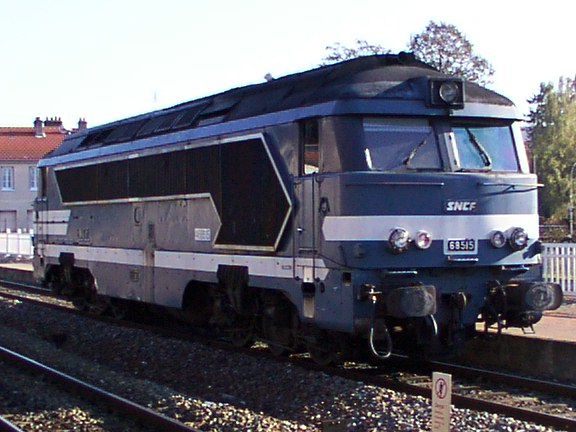
- A1AAIA 68515 at Vesoul
Type and origin
- Power type: Diesel-electric
- Builder: CAFL/CEM/SACM/Fives-Lille
- Build date: 1964–1968
- Number rebuilt: 5
Specifications
- Configuration
  - UIC: A1A-A1A
  - Commonwealth: A1A-A1A
- Gauge: 1,435 mm (4 ft 8 1/2 in)
- Wheel diameter: 1,250 mm (49 in)
- Length: 17.920 m (58 ft 9.5 in)
- Loco weight: 102 t (100 long tons; 112 short tons)
- Fuel type: Diesel
- Prime mover: AGO 12DSHR
- Transmission: Electric
Performance figures
- Maximum speed: 130 km/h (81 mph)
- Power output: 1,985 kW (2,662 hp)
- Tractive effort: 298 kN (67,000 lb_{f})
Career
- Operators: SNCF
- Class: A1AA1A 68500
- Number in class: 29
- Numbers: A1AA1A 68501–A1AA1A 68529

The SNCF Class A1AA1A 68500 is a class of 29 mixed traffic diesel locomotives originally intended for operating main line freight services on the Paris – Chalindrey – Belfort route. They are similar to the Class A1AA1A 68000 but with an AGO engine rather than the Sulzer fitted to the latter. 5 members of the class were rebuilt as A1AA1A 68000 by replacing the AGO prime mover with Sulzer engines, thought to be those formerly used in the BR Class 48 locomotives, D1702–1706. Subsequently, 13 members of the class 68000 were rebuilt as 68500 in 1993. The last was withdrawn from traffic in July 2011.
