= MV Monte Penedo =

Germany's first ocean-going Diesel-powered merchant ship

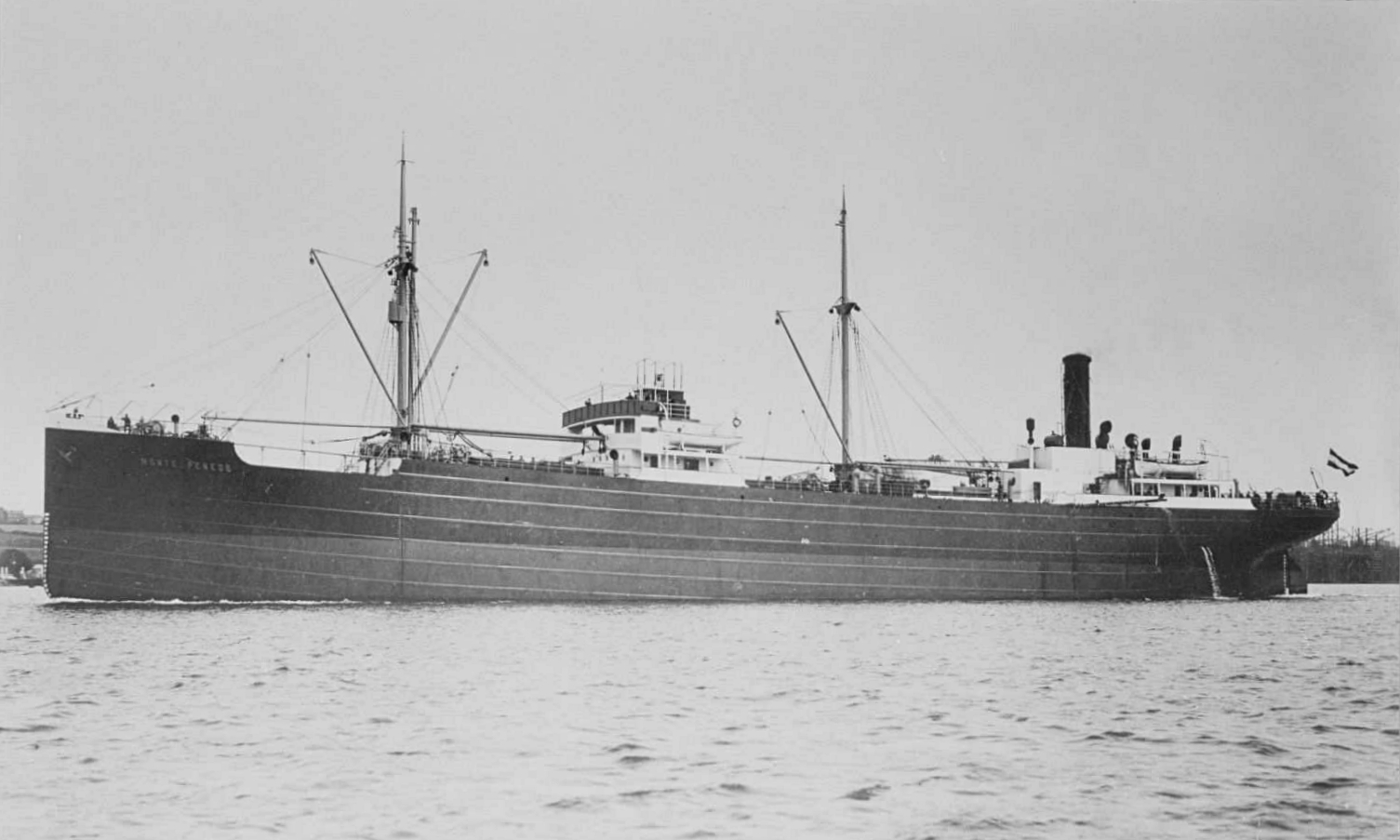
- Monte Penedo in ballast

History
- Name: 1912: Monte Penedo; 1917: Sabará; 1948: Ascanio Coelho
- Namesake: 1917: Sabará
- Owner: 1912: Hamburg Süd; 1917: Government of Brazil; 1927: Lloyd Brasileiro
- Operator: 1919: Government of France; 1923: Lloyd Brasileiro
- Port of registry: 1912: (German Empire) Hamburg; by 1919: (Brazil) Rio de Janeiro
- Builder: Howaldtswerke, Kiel
- Yard number: 546
- Launched: 7 February 1912
- Completed: 12 August 1912
- Maiden voyage: 31 August 1912
- Identification: 1912: code letters RSKD; by 1934: call sign PUCD
- Fate: Scrapped, 1969

General characteristics
- Type: cargo ship
- Tonnage: 3,693 GRT, 2,312 NRT, 6,324 DWT
- Length: 364 ft 0 in (110.9 m) overall; 350.7 ft (106.9 m) registered
- Beam: 50.1 ft (15.3 m)
- Draught: 23 ft 0 in (7.01 m) (summer)
- Depth: 23.7 ft (7.2 m)
- Decks: 2
- Installed power: 1912: 2 × 4-cylinder two-stroke diesel engines: 340 NHP; 1,600 or 1,700 bhp; 1948: 2 × 7-cylinder diesel engines
- Propulsion: 2 × screws
- Speed: 10 knots (19 km/h)
- Crew: 1912: 31

Monte Penedo was the first German sea-going motor ship. Howaldtswerke in Kiel built her for Hamburg Südamerikanische DG. Sulzer Brothers of Winterthur in Switzerland supplied her engines.

In 1917, Brazil seized her and renamed her Sabará. Lloyd Brasileiro was managing her by 1923, and owned her by 1927. In 1948 she was renamed Ascanio Coelho, and in 1949 she was re-engined. She was scrapped in 1969.

== Building and registration ==
Howaldtswerke built the ship as yard number 546. She was launched on 7 February 1912, and completed on 12 August. Her lengths were 364 ft 0 in (110.9 m) overall and 350.7 ft (106.9 m) registered. Her beam was 50.1 ft (15.3 m); her depth was 23.7 ft (7.2 m); and her summer draught was 23 ft 0 in (7.01 m). Her tonnages were 3,693 GRT; 2,312 NRT; and 6,324 DWT.

Monte Penedo's hull dimensions were almost exactly the same as those of a class of four cargo single-screw steamships that Neptun Werft and Bremer Vulkan had built for Hamburg Süd between 1908 and 1911: Santa Barbara; Santa Ursula; Santa Anna; and Santa Theresa. However, these four had a conventional steamship layout, with an engine room; single superstructure; and funnel all positioned amidships.

Monte Penedo's engine room was aft, and she had two superstructures: one amidships, which included her bridge; and the other aft, above her engine room. She had a funnel like that of a steamship. Some other early motor ships, such as the Danish Selandia and Fionia, had only an exhaust pipe, or a cluster of exhaust pipes.

Monte Penedo also differed from the Santa Barbara-class steamships by having twin screws. Sulzer supplied a pair of four-cylinder crosshead single-acting two-stroke diesel engines, of either type 4S47 or type 4SNo.9a. Each engine was rated at either 800 or 850 bhp at 160 revolutions per minute (rpm). They gave her a speed of 10 knots (19 km/h).

Hamburg Süd registered Monte Penedo in Hamburg. Her code letters were RSKD. She was equipped with wireless telegraphy.

== Maiden voyage ==
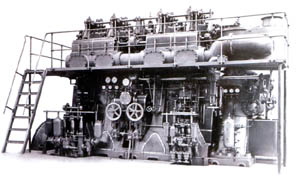
One of Monte Penedo's original Sulzer two-stroke diesel engines

Monte Penedo left Hamburg on 31 August 1912. She called at Lisbon in Portugal, where she left on 6 September. She then voyaged non-stop to Paranaguá in Brazil, where she arrived on 26 September. From there she continued to Buenos Aires in Argentina, where cracks were found in several pistons of her main engines.

The engines were overhauled, and Sulzer replaced all eight pistons with new ones of improved design. For her return voyage, she loaded at various ports of the Río de la Plata. She completed loading at Rosario, whence she returned to Europe. She returned to Hamburg on 1 March 1913, where her engines were stripped and inspected. Sulzer claimed that they were found to be in "excellent condition"; "clean and bright"; and "without showing the slightest appreciable wear and tear". This is supported by the fact that Hamburg Süd scheduled her to start her next voyage on 20 March.

Monte Penedo's fuel consumption averaged 7,200 Kg in 24 hours, or 151 grams per indicated horsepower-hour. Her consumption of lubricating oil, including her auxiliary equipment; steering engine; and so on, was 2.8 grams per indicated horsepower-hour. Sulzer was pleased with the performance of the governors of her engines. In a heavy sea, when her propellers were out of the water from time to time, her engine speed increased by only 10 to 12 rpm. Compared with an equivalent steamship, Monte Penedo required ten fewer crew members.

== Brazilian service ==
When the First World War began, in August 1914, Monte Penedo sought refuge in a port in Rio Grande do Sul in Brazil, to avoid Entente naval patrols. In February 1917, Germany resumed unrestricted submarine warfare. That April and May, German U-boats sank three Brazilian steamships. On 9 April, Brazil terminated diplomatic relations with Germany; placed armed guards on German ships in Brazilian ports; and removed "essential machinery". On 2 June, Brazil seized 46 German merchant ships that were sheltering in Brazilian ports, including Monte Penedo. She was renamed Sabará; after the city of Sabará in Minas Gerais; and was registered in Rio de Janeiro.

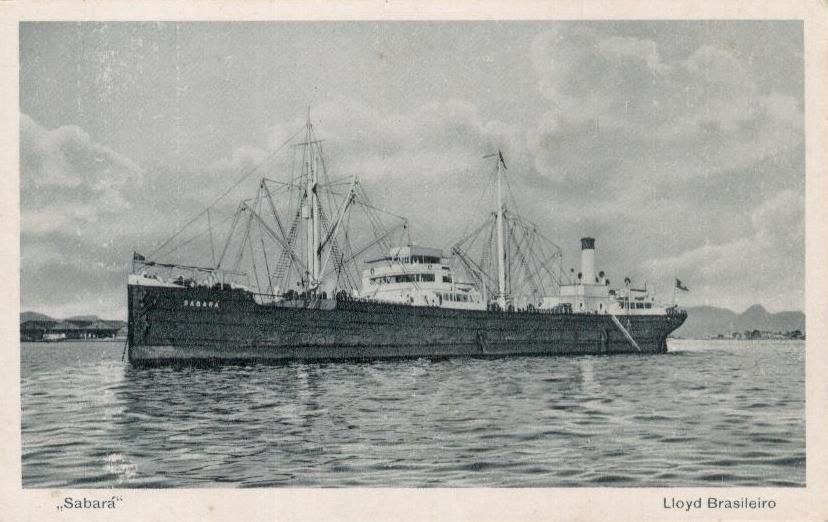
A postcard of the ship as Sabará

The Government of France chartered her from 1919 to 1922. Companhia de Navegação Lloyd Brasileiro was managing her by 1923, and owned her by 1927. By 1934, her four-letter call sign was PUCD, and this had superseded her code letters.

In 1948, Sabará was renamed Ascanio Coelho. In 1949, her original four-cylinder engines were replaced with a pair of seven-cylinder engines that Sulzer had built in 1943. They may have been type 7TS36. Each was rated at 1,050 Sulzer at 250 rpm.

In 1969, Lloyd Brasileiro sold Ascanio Coelho for scrap. She was broken up in Rio de Janeiro, starting that December.

== Bibliography ==
- Cooper, James; Kludas, Arnold; Pein, Joachim (1989). The Hamburg South America Line. Kendal: World Ship Society. ISBN 0-905617-50-9.
- Lloyd's Register of British and Foreign Shipping. Vol. II.–Steamers. London: Lloyd's Register of Shipping. 1912 – via Internet Archive.
- Lloyd's Register of Shipping. Vol. I.–Steamers. London: Lloyd's Register of Shipping. 1914 – via Internet Archive.
- Lloyd's Register of Shipping. Vol. II.–Steamers. London: Lloyd's Register of Shipping. 1919 – via Internet Archive.
- Lloyd's Register of Shipping. Vol. II.–Steamers. London: Lloyd's Register of Shipping. 1921 – via Internet Archive.
- Lloyd's Register of Shipping. Vol. II.–Steamers and Motor Vessels. London: Lloyd's Register of Shipping. 1923 – via Internet Archive.
- Lloyd's Register of Shipping. Vol. II.–Steamers and Motorships. London: Lloyd's Register of Shipping. 1927 – via Internet Archive.
- Lloyd's Register of Shipping (PDF). Vol. II.–Steamers and Motorships of 300 tons gross and over. London: Lloyd's Register of Shipping. 1934 – via Southampton City Council.
- Lloyd's Register of Shipping. Vol. I. A–L. London: Lloyd's Register of Shipping. 1948 – via Internet Archive.
- "Twin-Screw Motor Ship "Monte Penedo"" (PDF). The Marine Engineer and Naval Architect: 72–76. October 1912 – via Martin's Marine Engineering Page.
- Register Book. Vol. Register of Ships. London: Lloyd's Register of Shipping. 1957 – via Internet Archive.
- Sulzer, Gebrüder (May 1913). "Motor Ship Monte Penedo". International Marine Engineering. XVIII (5). New York City: Aldrich Publishing Co: 222 – via Internet Archive.
- Supino, Giorgio (1915). Land and Marine Diesel Engines. London: Charles Griffin & Co – via Internet Archive.
