= Soviet locomotive class E el-8 =

E el-8 or Ээл8
Type and origin
- Power type: Diesel-electric
- Builder: Krupp, works no. 1200
- Build date: 1933
Specifications
- Configuration
  - UIC: 2-Eo-1
- Loco weight: 135 t (133 long tons; 149 short tons) (?)
- Prime mover: 2 x Sulzer 8LV31
- RPM range: Max. 650 rpm
- Transmission: Diesel-electric; Electrics by Secheron
Performance figures
- Maximum speed: 60 km/h (37 mph)
- Power output: Diesel: 2 x 825 hp (615 kW) (1 hour); 2 x 750 hp (560 kW) (continuous); Traction motors: 1,200 hp (890 kW)
- Tractive effort: 12,000 kgf (120,000 N; 26,000 lbf)
Career
- Number in class: 1

Class E el-8 (Cyrillic script: Ээл8) was a Soviet diesel-electric locomotive built by Krupp in 1933 with engines by Sulzer and electrical equipment by Secheron.

== Powertrain ==
There were two Sulzer 8LV31 straight-eight engines placed side by side with a gangway between them. This arrangement had been patented by Eugen Zbinden and Sulzer, patent US1632209 of 1927. Each engine delivered 750 hp (continuous rating) making a total of 1,500 hp. Electrical equipment was by Secheron of Geneva and total power of the traction motors was 1,200 hp.

== Service ==
No details of the locomotive in service are available. It is not known to have been preserved.
