= 2-10-0 =

Locomotive wheel arrangement

2-10-0 (Decapod)
- Front of locomotive at left

- Pennsylvania Railroad class PRR I1s, the most successful class of such locomotives in North America. Note the firebox placed above the rear drivers.
Equivalent classifications
- UIC class: 1′E
- French class: 150
- Turkish class: 56
- Swiss class: 5/6
- Russian class: 1-5-0
First known tender engine version
- First use: 1886
- Country: United States
- Locomotive: No. 1 & 2
- Railway: Northern Pacific Railway
- Designer: Burnham, Parry, Williams & Company
- Builder: Burnham, Parry, Williams & Company
- Evolved from: 0-10-0
- Evolved to: 2-10-2
- Benefits: Better stability than the 0-10-0
- Drawbacks: Small firebox

Under the Whyte notation for the classification of steam locomotives, 2-10-0 represents the wheel arrangement of two leading wheels on one axle, ten powered and coupled driving wheels on five axles, and no trailing wheels. This arrangement was often named Decapod, especially in the United States, although this name was sometimes applied to locomotives of 0-10-0 "Ten-Coupled" arrangement, particularly in the United Kingdom. Notable German locomotives of this type include the war locomotives of Class 52.

These locomotives were popular in Europe, particularly in Germany and Russia; British use of the type was confined to the period during and after World War II. In the United States, the 2-10-0 was not widely popular but was a favorite of a small number of railroads which operated mostly in mountainous terrain. Among these was the Erie Railroad, a major Chicago to New York trunk line railroad, and the Pennsylvania Railroad, whose heavily graded routes crossed the Allegheny Mountains.

The 2-10-0's main advantage was that five out of six of its axles were powered, meaning almost all the weight was available for traction rather than being distributed over pilot and trailing wheels. The long rigid wheelbase caused problems on tightly curved track, so blind drivers were the norm, either on the central axle, and/or on the second and/or fourth axles. Often lateral motion devices were attached to the leading drive axle.

The wheel arrangement's disadvantages included the firebox size restriction caused by the lack of trailing wheel. This meant the firebox was fitted in between the wheels (common on earlier locomotives) and was long and narrow, or if mounted above the driving wheels, was wide and long but shallow. Many locomotives chose the latter option. A firebox mounted over the drivers also restricted the diameter of the driving wheels, which in turn limited speed. As with the Consolidation (2-8-0), "chopping" at speed ensured a rough ride for the crew due to instability caused by the wheel arrangement. In fact, backing any locomotive without a trailing axle was restricted to under twenty miles per hour or less. Most 2-10-0s were not operated at speeds greater than 50 mph (80 km/h).

The type operated as freight engine, although locomotives in Germany and the United Kingdom proved capable of hauling passenger trains.

== United States ==
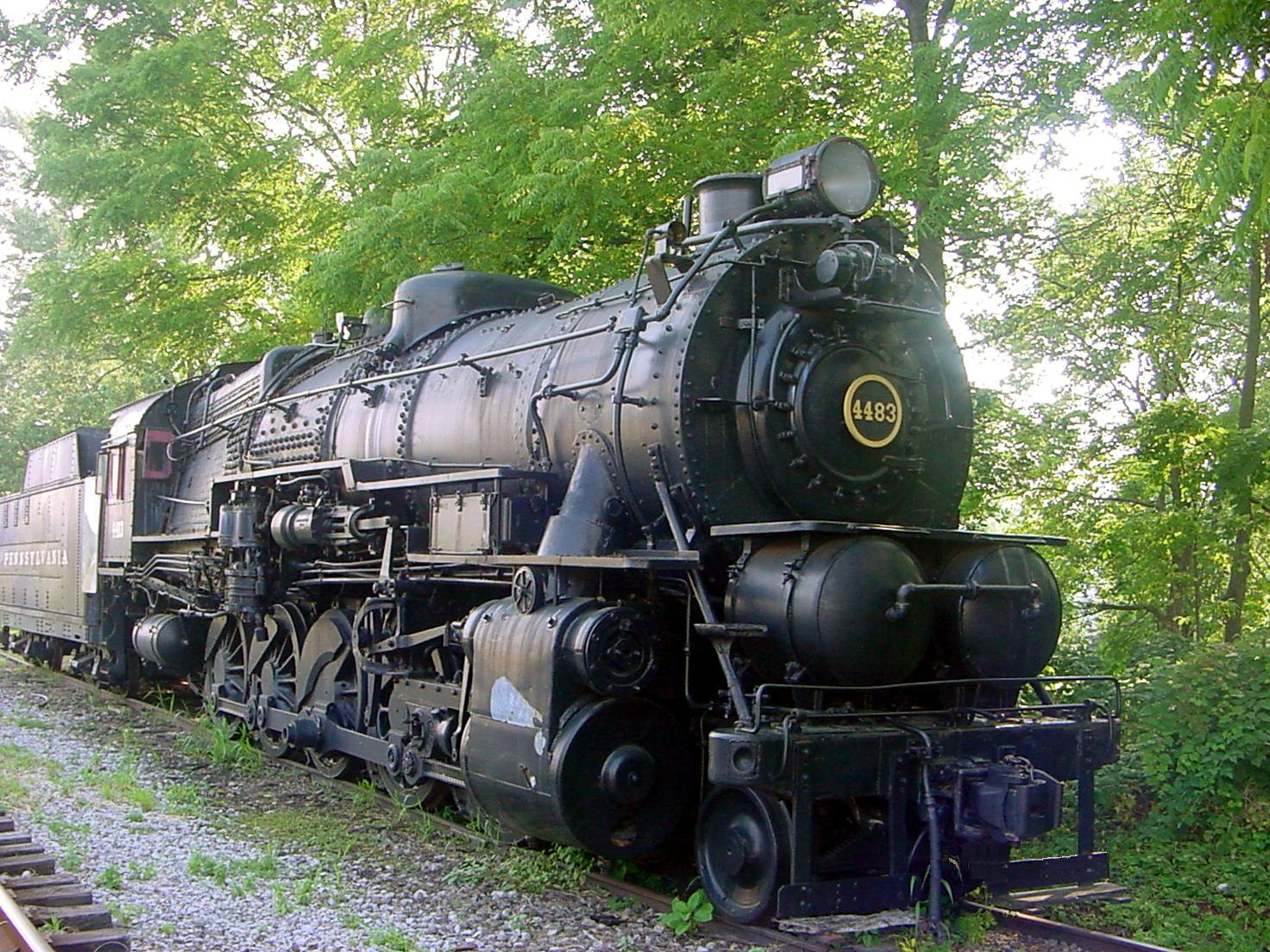
Pennsylvania Railroad I1s Locomotive

The first Decapods were built for the Lehigh Valley Railroad in the late-1860s. They proved too rough on the track because of their long coupled wheelbase. No more followed for 19 years, until the Northern Pacific Railway bought two for use on the switchbacks over Stampede Pass, while the 2-mile (3.2 km) tunnel was being built. In low-speed service where high tractive effort was critical, these Decapods were successful. Small numbers of other Decapods were built over the next twenty years, mostly for service in steeply graded mountainous areas where power at low speeds was the requirement. The type did not prove as popular as the successful Consolidation (2-8-0) type. Among Decapod users was the Atchison, Topeka and Santa Fe Railway. The engines were tandem compounds but their ongoing reversing limitations became the genesis of the 2-10-2 wheel arrangement.

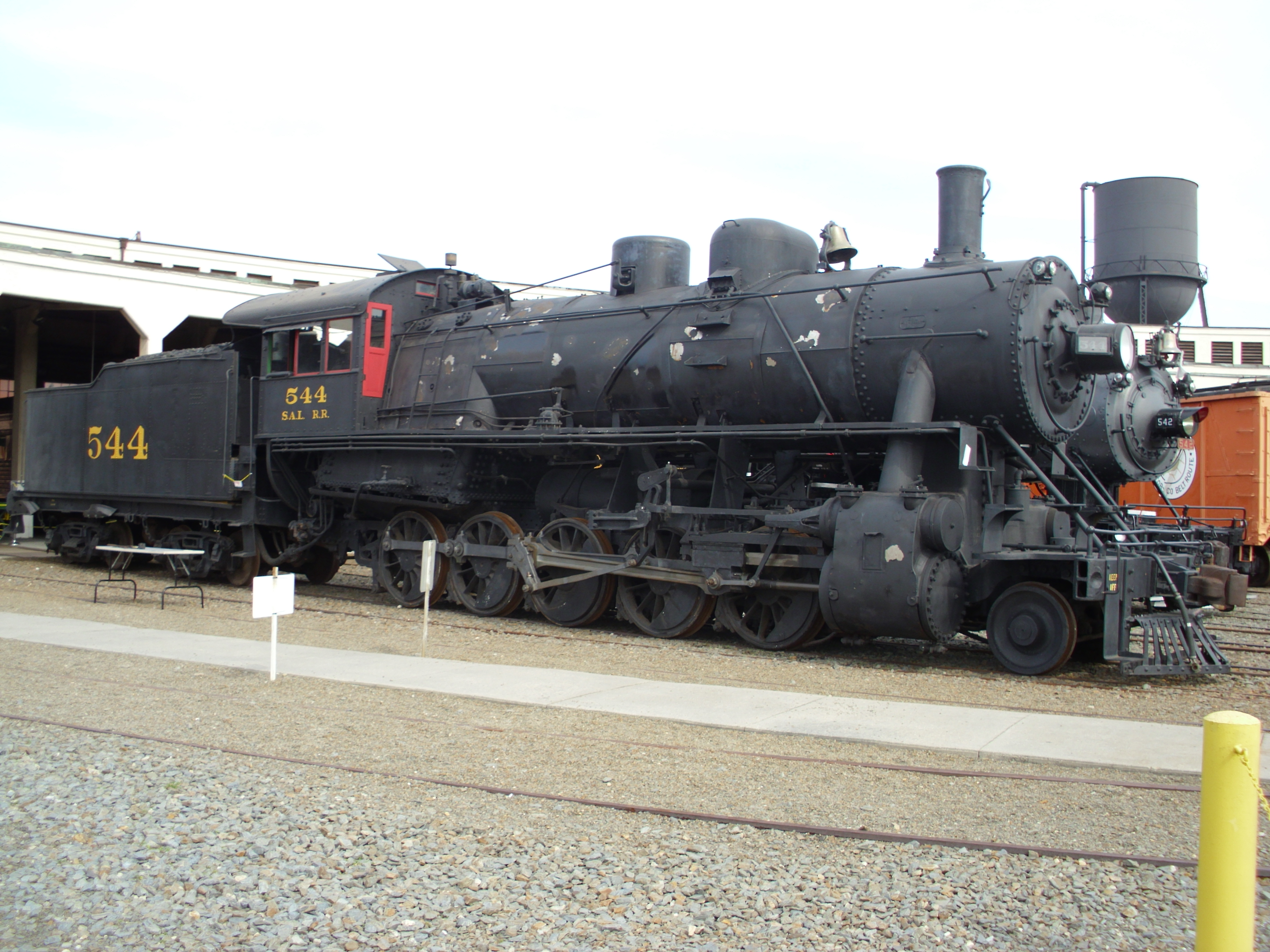
Seaboard Air Line #544, one of over 200 undelivered Russian Decapods. It resides at the North Carolina Transportation Museum. Note the smaller boiler diameter, compared to the I1s above

The first boost in the number of Decapods occurred when Imperial Russia ordered approximately 1,200 Decapods from American builders during World War I. When the Bolshevik revolution occurred in 1917, 857 had already been delivered, but more than 200 were either awaiting shipment or were in the process of construction. These stranded locomotives were adopted by the United States Railroad Administration (USRA), the body created by the Government to oversee and control the railroads during the War, converted to American standards, and put to use on American railroads. Small and light-footed, these Russian decapods proved popular with smaller railroads, and many of them remained in service long after the USRA's control of the railroads ceased. Many indeed lasted until the end of steam on those railroads.

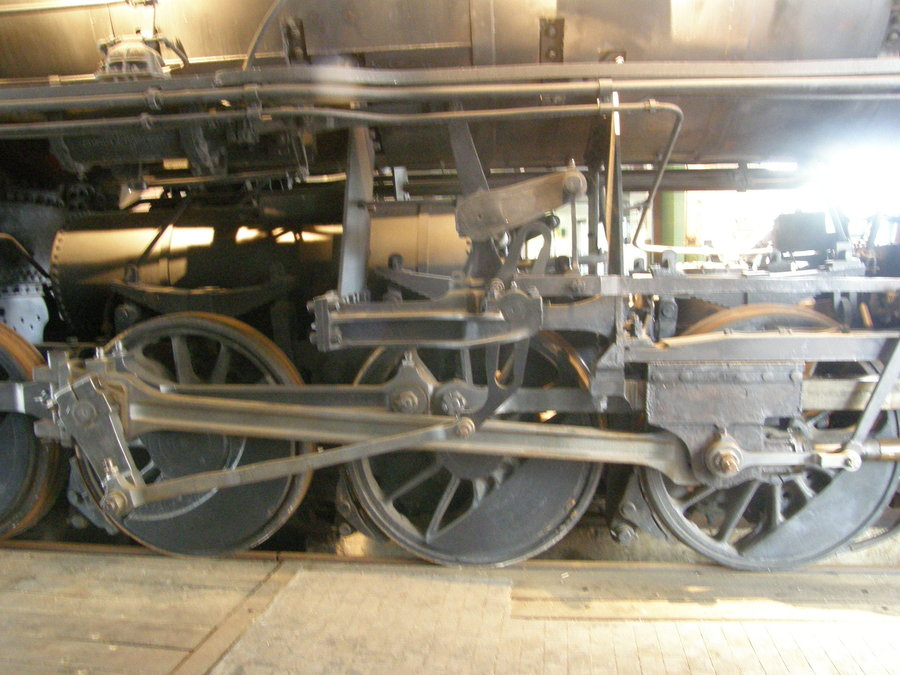
The same Russian Decapod, showing the large gap between the boiler and drivers, typical of locomotives designed for Russia

Swengel suggested the 2-10-0 arrangement was 'obsolete' by 1916, when the Pennsylvania Railroad commenced an experiment with a 2-10-0 locomotive at its Juniata plant. Most 10 coupled engines constructed for U.S. railroads during World War I were of the USRA 2-10-2 arrangement, but the PRR committed to 122 of the 2-10-0s. Swengel argued this commitment to the 2-10-0, nicknamed "Deks", was controversial even in 1916 and was more so in 1922 when the PRR placed additional orders. The PRR was soon the biggest user of Decapods in the United States. The type was ideally suited to the Pennsy's heavily graded Allegheny Mountains routes, which required lugging ability according to tractive effort, not speed according to horse power.

The PRR bought 598 2-10-0s including 123 built at its own shops. In one of the largest locomotive orders ever, the rest came from the Baldwin Locomotive Works. The PRR 2-10-0s weighed 386,100 lb (175.1 t) and developed about 90,000 lbf (400.3 kN) of tractive effort (Note: Maximum cutoff as built was nominally 50% (with small auxiliary ports to aid in starting) so "tractive effort" couldn't be calculated in the usual way. Cutoff on most engines was eventually extended and PRR claimed 96,000 lb for them.) with an axle loading of over 70,000 lb (32 t). The engines steamed at 250 psi (1.72 MPa) and had a relatively large superheater. The grate area of about 70 sq ft (6.5 m^{2}) was on the small side, but a mechanical stoker partly compensated for this.

The PRR decapod, class I1s, was unlike the Russian decapod; it was huge, taking advantage of the PRR's heavy trackage and high axle loading, with a fat, free-steaming boiler that earned the type the nickname of 'Hippos' on the PRR. Two giant cylinders (30½ x 32 inch) gave the I1s power and their tenders permitted hard and long workings between stops. They were unpopular with the crews, for they were hard riding. The last operations on the PRR were 1957.

A small number of other Decapods were ordered by other railroads; the I-2 Decapods built for the Western Maryland Railway were the largest ever built, at almost 420,000 lb (190 t) weight, and are a notable exception to the rule of thumb for the comfort of the ride on a 2-10-0 wheel arrangement, crews said the engines cruised smoothly up to 50 mph without becoming a rough ride. (After the running gear was redesigned by the WM) The WM's I-2 are also noted as the strongest Decapods ever built, at 96,315 lbs of tractive effort. (Not to be confused with the 10 Russian Decapods the WM held in their roster, which were standard Russian Decapods aside from heavier steel frames the WM used to replace the original cast iron frames, the new frames also made the WM Russian Decapods 2 inches longer than other Russian Decapods)

Baldwin developed two standard 2-10-0s for railroads with low axle-load requirements.

Thirteen Decapod locomotives survive in the US, including two Baldwin standards, six Russian Decapods and one PRR I1. Two, Great Western 90, a Baldwin Decapod at the Strasburg Rail Road, and Frisco 1630, a Russian Decapod at the Illinois Railway Museum, are operational. One Decapod survives as a static exhibit at the North Carolina Transportation Museum in Spencer, North Carolina (Seaboard Air Line 2-10-0 #544).

=== Preserved Decapods in the United States ===
- 1621 is on display at the National National Museum of Transportation - St. Louis, MO
- 1625 is on display at the Museum of the American Railroad - Frisco, TX
- 1630 is operated by the Illinois Railway Museum - Union, IL.
- 90 is operated by Strasburg Railroad - Strasburg, PA.
- I1 class 4483 is at Hamburg, New York.
- 950 (originally 600) is on display in Ashland, WI at the Ashland Station

=== Proposed/Unbuilt (US) ===
L.D. Porta proposed a 2-10-0, triple expansion Modern steam locomotive as a "third generation" fast-freight locomotive in the 1970s, which he repurpoused for the ACE 3000 project as the ACE 6000.

== Germany ==
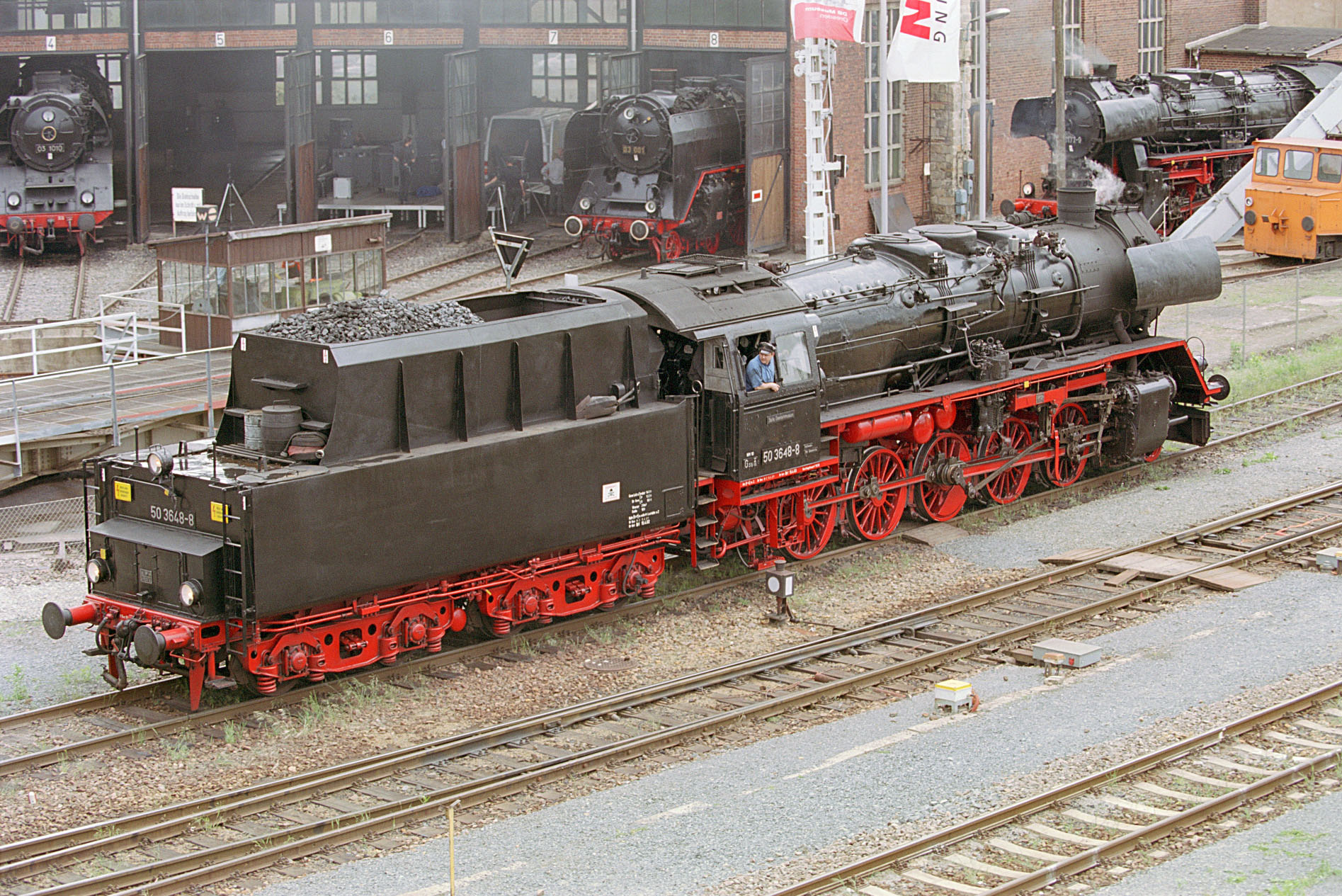
A BR50

The 2-10-0 arrangement was a very popular one in Germany. The first were built by the individual state railways from 1915 to 1918, and these later became the DRG BR58. The DRG then produced a number of standard classes of 2-10-0s: the heavy 3-cylinder BR44 (1753 built), the two-cylinder version BR43 (35 built), and the lightweight BR50 (3164 built). During wartime, the BR44 and BR50 designs were simplified as ÜK (Übergangs Kriegslokomotiven, or interim war locomotives). By 1941, it was clear that even these were too complicated, expensive, time-consuming to build, and used too much material in short supply, so new Kriegslokomotive (war locomotive) designs were developed: the lightweight BR52 (7794 built) and the intermediate weight BR42 (859 built).

Postwar locomotives of these types, particularly the BR 52, were spread all over Europe and were taken into service by the railways of many different countries:

- BR44 in France, SNCF 150X.
- BR50 in Belgium, NMBS/SNCB class 25; in Denmark, DSB class N.
- BR52 in Austria, ÖBB class 52; in Belgium, NMBS/SNCB class 26; in Norway, NSB Class 63.

== United Kingdom ==
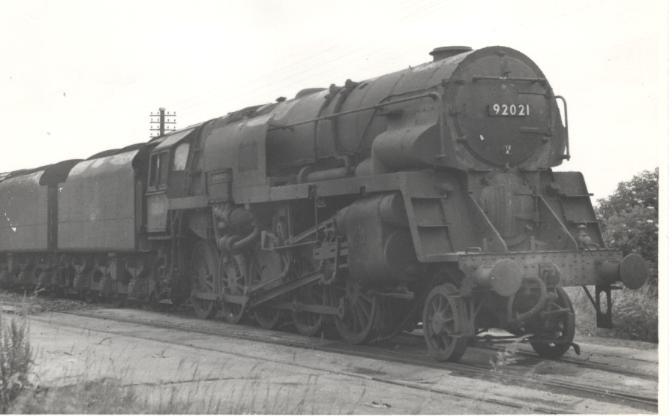
BR Standard Class 9F with the experimental Franco-Crosti boiler

Locomotives with ten driving wheels were rare in British railway history. In 1913 an initial design for a four-cylinder 2-10-0 of 53,328 pounds-force (237,000 N) tractive effort was produced by the Lancashire and Yorkshire Railway, but none were built. This had been inspired by Jean-Baptiste Flamme's Type 36 (SNCB) 2-10-0s working in Belgium and used a similar tapered boiler, with the round-topped firebox almost filling the loading gauge. The first 2-10-0 was built during the Second World War, as a variant of the "Austerity" 2-8-0 for lightly built railways.

The only other 2-10-0 type was the 251-strong Standard class 9F introduced by British Railways in 1954. The class included 92220 Evening Star, the last steam locomotive built for British Railways, in 1960; and 92203 (named Black Prince when preserved), which in 1983 set a record for the heaviest steam locomotive-hauled train in Britain when it started a 2,162-ton train at Foster Yeoman quarry in Somerset.

== Finland ==
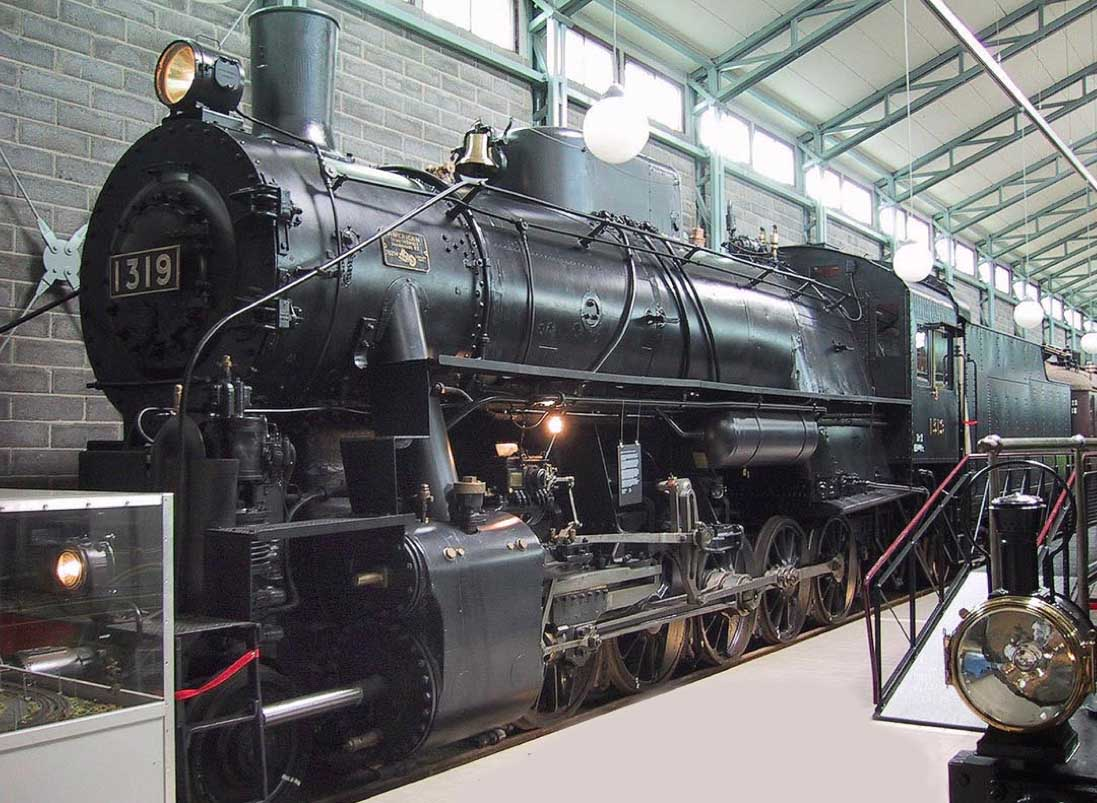
ALCO No 75214 Tr2 1319 at the Finnish Railway Museum

The State Railroads of Finland purchased 20 American Decapods after WWII - these were originally built for the Soviet Union, but never delivered to them. Of the 20 engines, 10 were made by Baldwin, 10 by Alco. Since they were originally built for the USSR, they had the correct gauge for Finland, too (1,524 mm (5 ft) exactly). One (Alco # 75214, 1947) is preserved at the Finnish Railway Museum in Hyvinkää, Finland. The Finnish designation was Tr2.

The locomotive was nicknamed Truman in Finland. It was used for hauling heavy freight trains.

== France ==
From 1910 to 1951, the French industry built more than 500 decapods for three railway companies (Paris-Orléans, Nord, Est) and for the national railways (SNCF). Moreover, at the end of World War II, SNCF inherited more than 200 units of German decapods built in France, mostly BR 44. The last decapod, a SNCF 150P, was withdrawn in 1968. All 2-10-0s, of French or of German design, proved reliable and powerful in service. One can notice that some engines of the Paris-Orléans company were dedicated to passenger service on difficult mountain lines.

== Poland ==
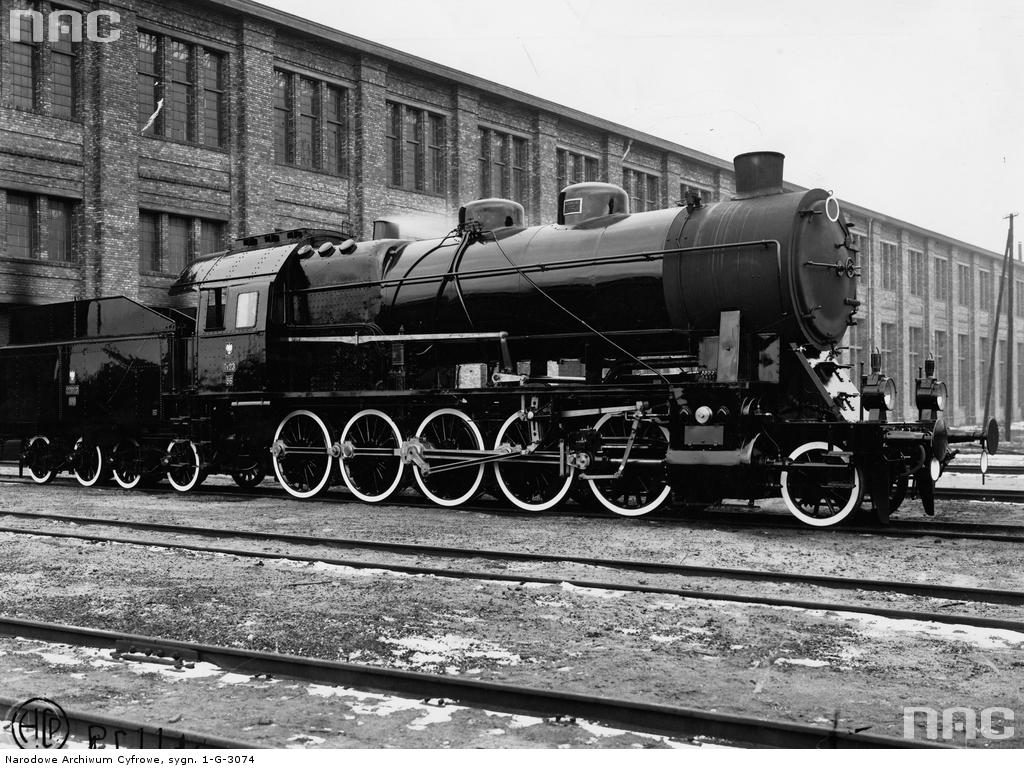
PKP class Ty23 in front of the H. Cegielski Poznań works

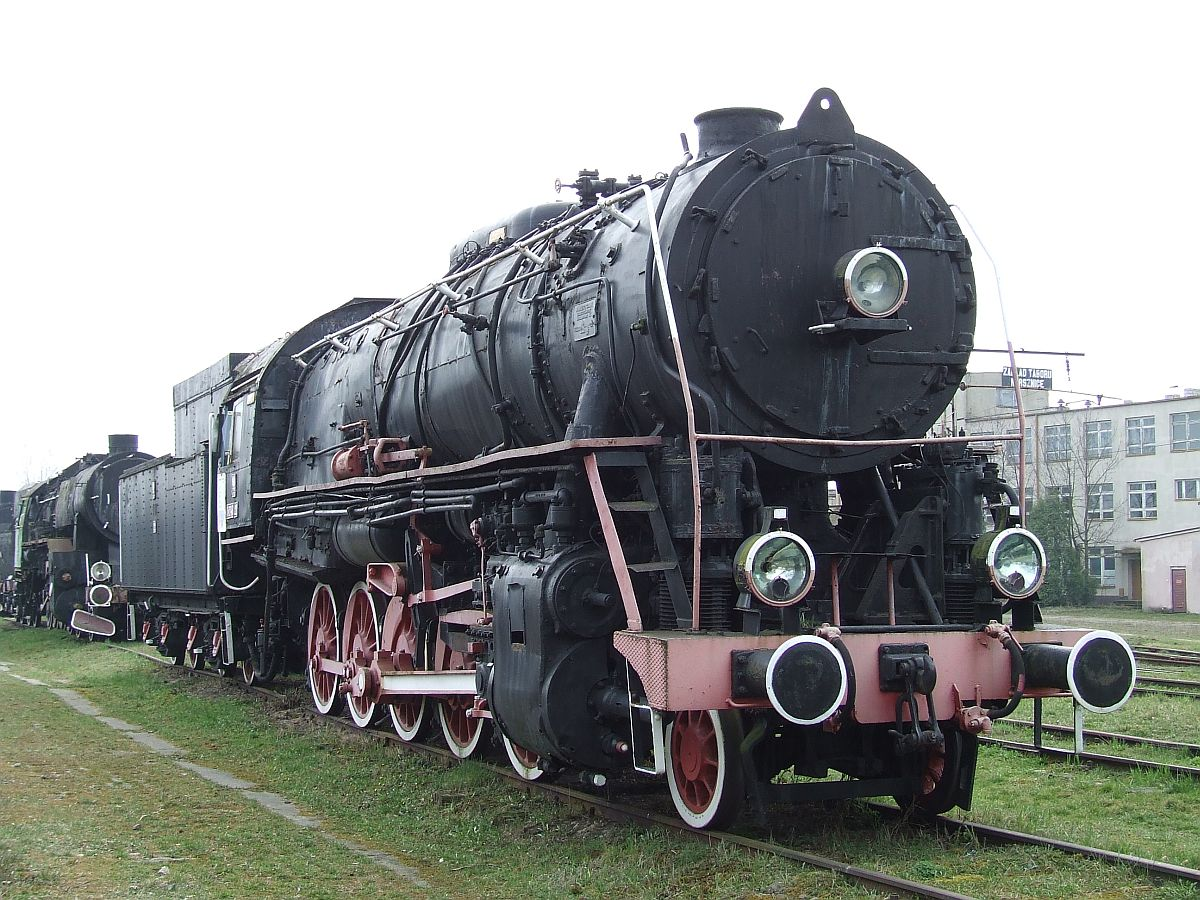
Preserved PKP class Ty246

Between early 1920s and 1958 Polish industry delivered to PKP some 1200 decapods of classes Ty23, Ty37, Ty45 and Ty51. PKP also operated German decapods BR 52 (Ty2) and BR 42 (Ty3), as well as American ones (Ty246, nicknamed "Truman"). They were used to work the heaviest goods trains.

== Romania ==
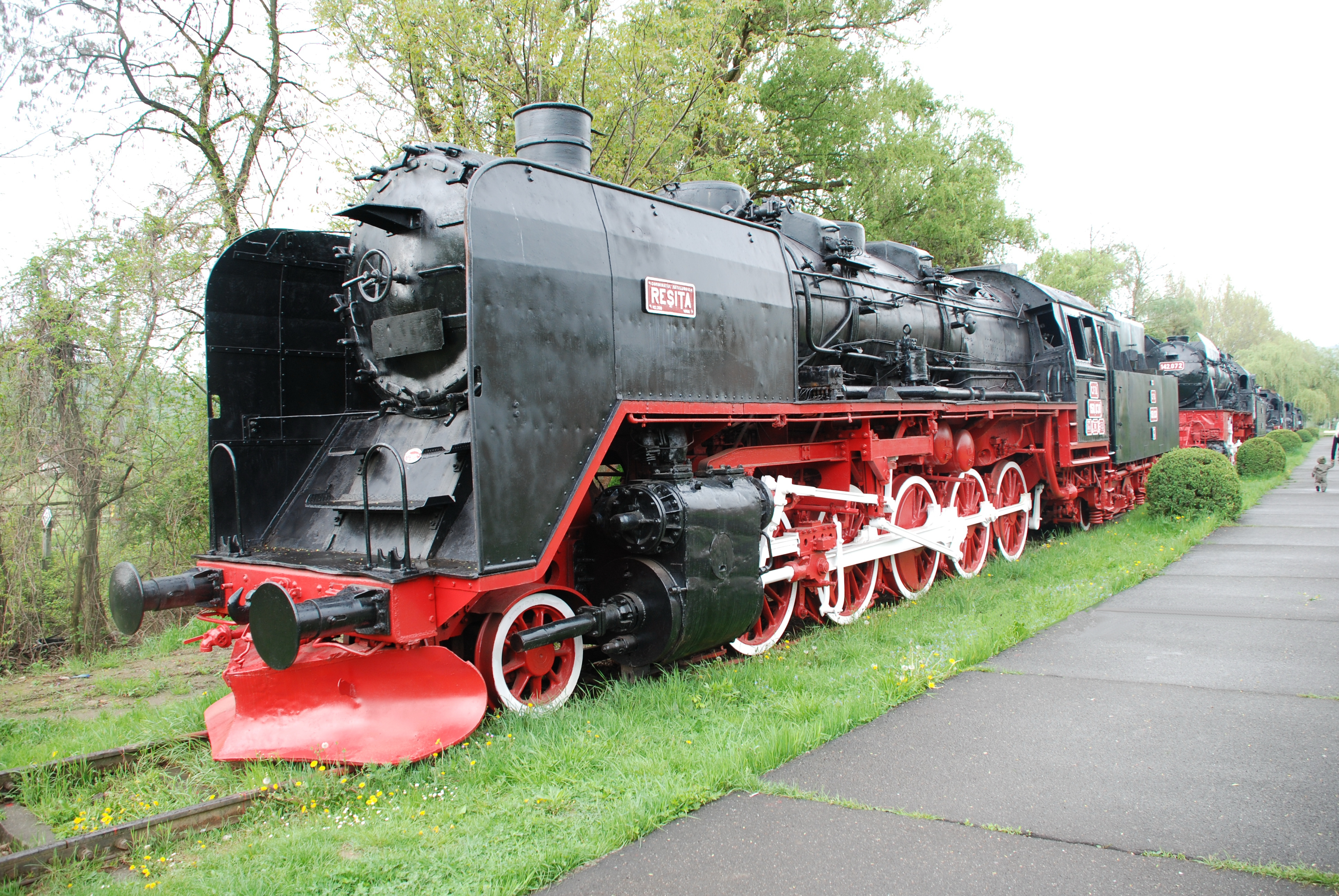
Romanian 150.000 Class

After the Second World War, Romania built the 150.000 Class, after DRB Class 50. A total of 282 locomotives were built between 1946 and 1960, at Malaxa (later 23 August Works) in Bucharest, and in Reșița.

Builder details:

- 150.001-150.050 Reșița
- 150.051-150.081 Malaxa
- 150.082-150.282 Reșița

== Soviet Union ==
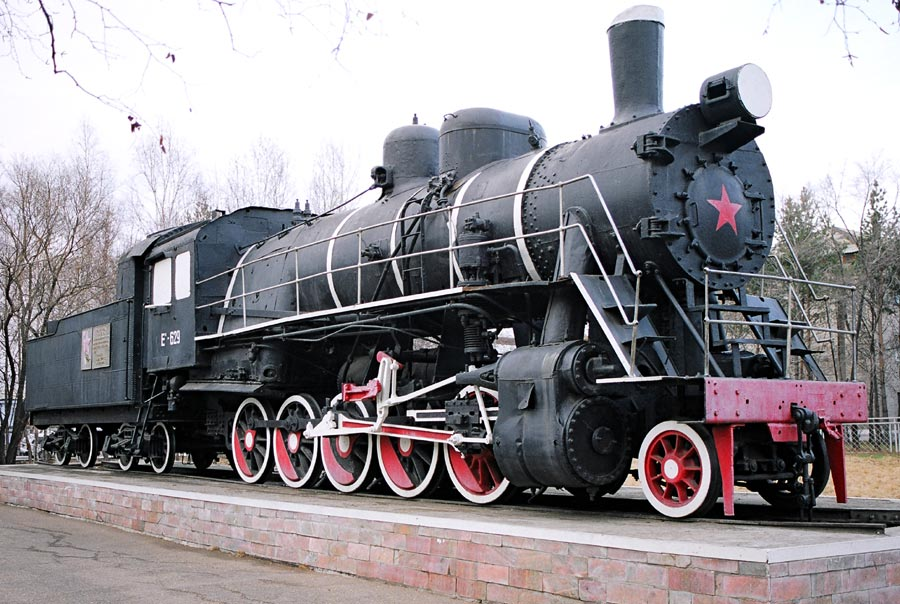
Steam Locomotive YeL 629 in Ussuriysk

2-10-0 were fairly common freight locomotives in the former Soviet Union. They came from several sources: US imports (class Ye (Russian: серия Е), built by ALCO and Baldwin, respectively), German war trophy DRB 52 class locomotives (what became the Soviet TE-series) and locally built. The locally built 2-10-0 locomotives were represented by some TE (built from captured German parts), SO (Sergo Ordjonikidze) and L (Lebedyanski)–series locomotives. The L-series locomotives were one of the more advanced steam locomotives built in the former Soviet Union. They used an automatic stoker to feed coal and had a relatively low axle load (18 tonnes or 40,000 lb) to be compatible with the war-torn railroads of the former Soviet Union. Several examples of these locomotives are still preserved in working order.

There is a 2-10-0 Lebedyanski series locomotive L 4657, marooned in a siding at Port Baikal.
