= SNCB Type 36 =

NMBS/SNCB Type 36
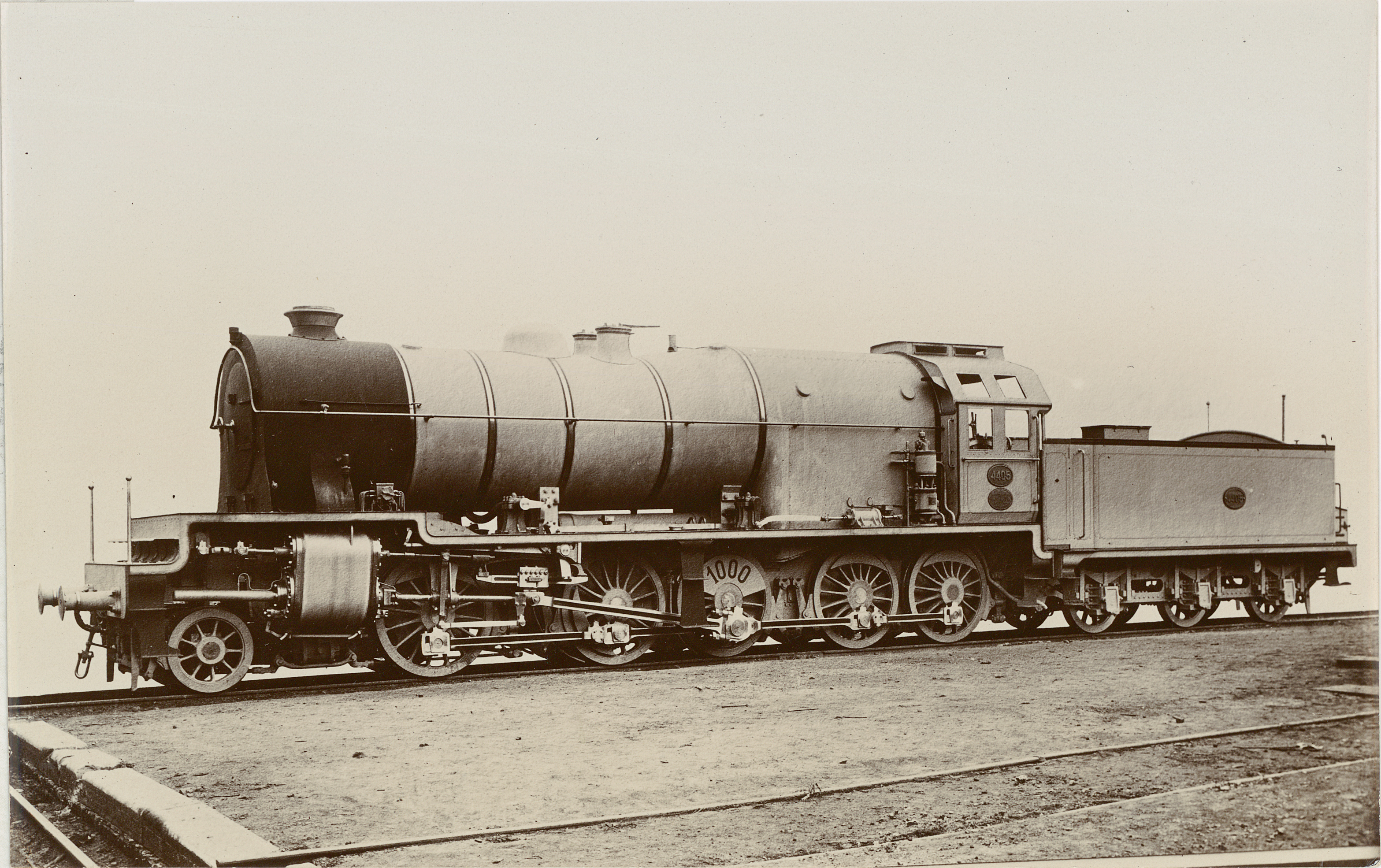
- Circa 1910 photo of the locomotive type.
Type and origin
- Power type: Steam
- Designer: Jean-Baptiste Flamme
- Builder: SNCB/NMBS central railway workshops in Mechelen
- Build date: 1909-1914
- Total produced: 136
Specifications
- Configuration
  - Whyte: 2-10-0 “Decapod”
- Gauge: 1,435 mm (4 ft 8 1/2 in) standard gauge
- Fuel type: Coal
Career
- Operators: SNCB/NMBS
- Class: Type 36
- Numbers: 4365 to 4500, later 3600 to 3692
- Withdrawn: 1947-1951

The NMBS/SNCB Type 36 was a class of 2-10-0 Decapod steam locomotives built from 1909 to 1914 for heavy freight service in Belgium operated by the National Railway Company of Belgium.

== Design and construction ==
The class was designed by engineer Jean-Baptiste Flamme and built by NMBS/SNCB themselves, in their central railway workshops in Mechelen, Belgium.

=== Type Фл ===
Some units were provided to World War I ally Russia. It was decided to sell 80 of them to the Russians, these would serve on the standard gauge lines of Galicia and in eastern Poland. However, some were lost at sea when a U-boat torpedoed the ship transporting them and others fell victim to derailments during their transport. 21 examples remained in France because of the Russian Revolution of 1917 and the armistice signed with the Germans. Five others were found in Kiev by the Poles and were returned to Belgium in 1920. It is also thought that some locomotives were in Ukraine during Operation Faustschlag and subsequently brought back by the Germans.

== Operation ==
The units served to haul heavy freight trains on the Luxembourg line (lines 161 and 162) as well as on the Athus-Meuse line (lines 165 and 166) and between Verviers and Trois-Ponts via lines 44 and 45.

Some units also served in Russia during World War I.

== See also ==
- History of rail transport in Belgium
- List of SNCB/NMBS classes
- Rail transport in Belgium
- L&YR 2-10-0 (Hughes)
