= SNCF Class A1AA1A 68000 =

Class of 80 French diesel-electric locomotives

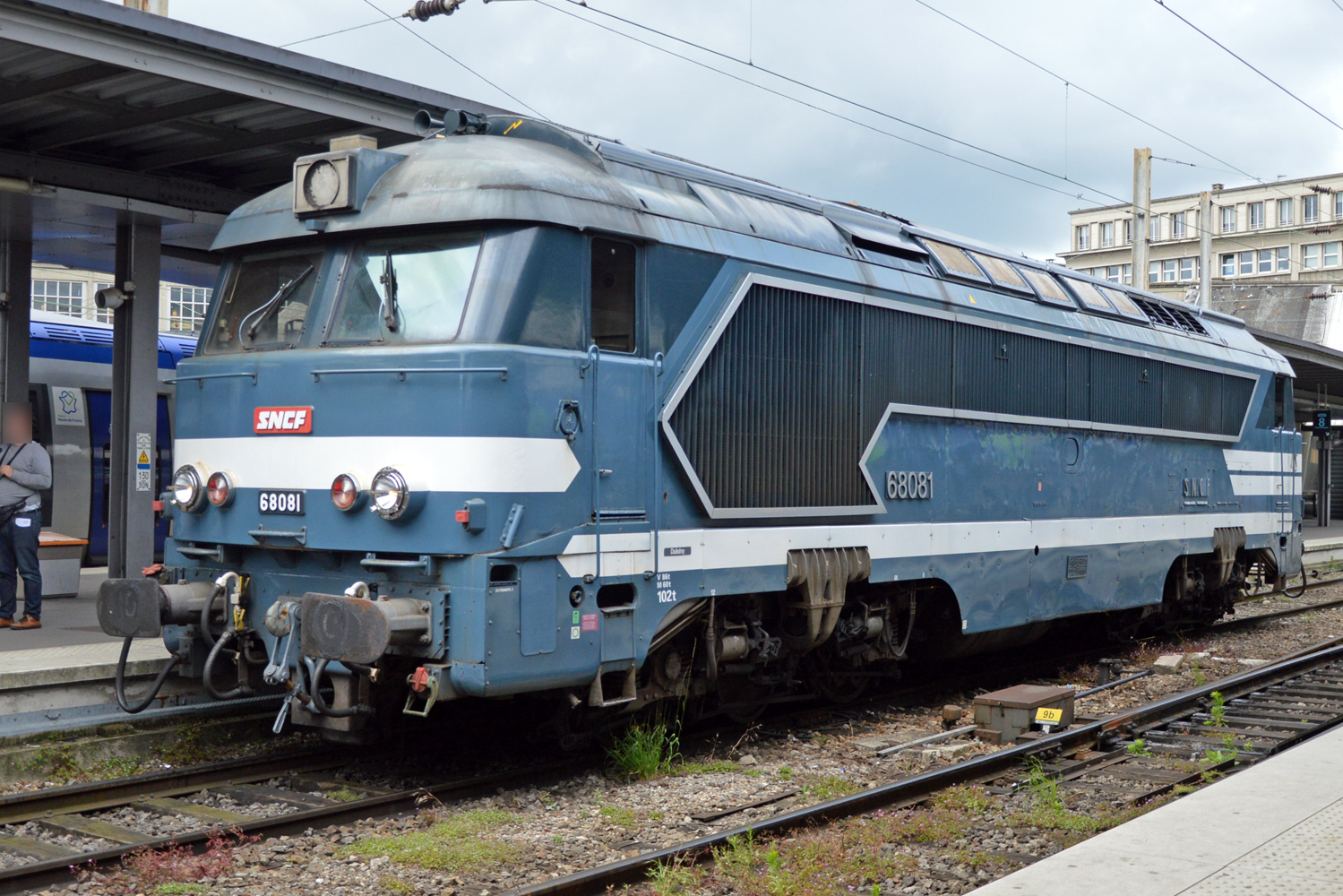
- No. A1A-A1A 68081 in original livery at Amiens.
Type and origin
- Power type: Diesel
- Build date: 1963–1968
- Total produced: 80
Specifications
- Configuration
  - AAR: A1A-A1A
  - UIC: (A1A)(A1A)
- Gauge: 1,435 mm (4 ft 8 1/2 in)
- Bogies: Y 211
- Wheel diameter: 1,250 mm (49.21 in)
- Length: 18,010 mm (59 ft 1.1 in)
- Width: 2,920 mm (9 ft 7.0 in)
- Height: 4,280 mm (14 ft 0.5 in)
- Loco weight: 105 t (103 long tons; 116 short tons)
- Prime mover: Sulzer 12LVA 24
- Engine type: V12 diesel
- Cylinders: 12
Performance figures
- Maximum speed: 130 km/h (81 mph)
Career
- Operators: SNCF

The SNCF Class A1AA1A 68000 is a class of diesel-electric locomotives of the SNCF. Originally a class of 80 locomotives, they were built for both passenger and freight service. They were ordered on 7 June 1961, the first entering service on 13 December 1963 at Chalindrey depot. A further 5 were added by refitting members of the similar AGO powered Class A1AA1A 68500 with Sulzer engines, thought to be those formerly used in the BR Class 48 locomotives, D1702–1706. Subsequently, 13 members of the class were rebuilt as Class A1AA1A 68500, 1 in 1963 and 12 in 1993. The last was withdrawn from traffic in 2005, with the exception of 68081 which has been preserved at the Cité du Train.

Number	Rebuilt from
A1AA1A 68005	A1AA1A 68501
A1AA1A 68082	A1AA1A 68529
A1AA1A 68083	A1AA1A 68525
A1AA1A 68084	A1AA1A 68508
A1AA1A 68085	A1AA1A 68510
