= Horsepower-hour =

Unit of energy

horsepower-hour
- Unit of: Energy
- Symbol: hp⋅h

Conversions
1 hp⋅h in ...	... is equal to ...
- SI units: 2.685 MJ
- CGS units: 2.685×10^{13} erg
- English Engineering Units: 1.98×10^{6} ft⋅lbf

A horsepower-hour (symbol: hp⋅h) is an outdated unit of energy, not used in the International System of Units. The unit represents an amount of work a horse is supposed capable of delivering during an hour (1 horsepower integrated over a time interval of an hour). Based on differences in the definition of what constitutes the "power of a horse," a horsepower-hour differs slightly from the German Pferdestärkenstunde (PSh):

1.014 PSh = 1 hp⋅h = 1,980,000 lbf⋅ft = 0.7457 kW⋅h.

1 PSh = 0.73549875 kW⋅h = 2647.7955 kJ (exactly by definition)

The horsepower-hour is still used in the railroad industry when sharing motive power (locomotives). For example, if Railroad A borrows a 2,500 horsepower locomotive from Railroad B and operates it for twelve hours, Railroad A owes a debt of (2,500 hp × 12 h) 30,000 hp⋅h. Railroad A may repay the debt by loaning Railroad B a 3,000 horsepower locomotive for ten hours.
