= British Rail Class 48 =

Class of diesel electric locomotives

Brush Type 4 British Rail Class 48
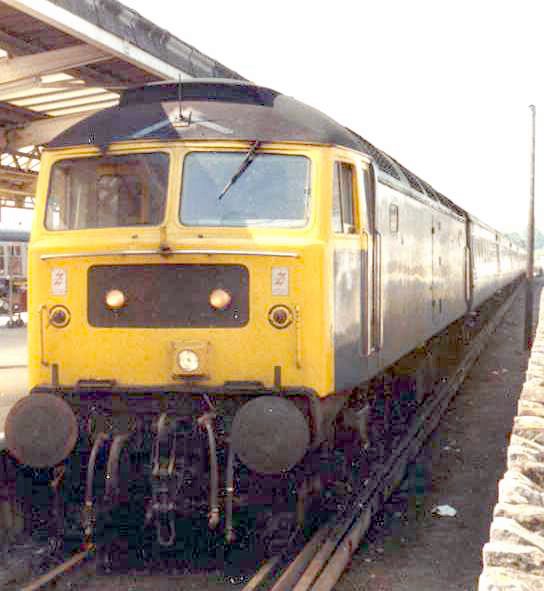
- Former Class 48, No.47117, at Weymouth station in 1989
Type and origin
- Power type: Diesel-electric
- Builder: Brush Traction, Falcon Works
- Build date: 1965–1966
- Total produced: 5
Specifications
- Configuration
  - UIC: Co'Co'
  - Commonwealth: Co-Co
- Wheel diameter: 3 ft 9 in (1.143 m)
- Wheelbase: 51 ft 6 in (15.70 m)
- Length: 63 ft 6 in (19.35 m)
- Width: 8 ft 10 in (2.69 m)
- Height: 12 ft 9 3/8 in (3.90 m)
- Loco weight: 112 long tons (114 t; 125 short tons)
- Prime mover: Sulzer 12LVA24
- MU working: Not fitted
- Train heating: Steam generator
- Train brakes: Vacuum
Performance figures
- Maximum speed: 95 mph (153 km/h)
- Power output: Engine: 2,650 bhp (1,976 kW)
- Brakeforce: 60 long tons-force (598 kN)
Career
- Operators: British Rail
- Numbers: D1702–D1706
- Axle load class: Route availability 7 (RA 6 from 1969)
- Disposition: Re-engined to Class 47, 1969–1971

The British Rail Class 48 was a diesel locomotive class which consisted of five examples, built at Brush Falcon Works in Loughborough and delivered between September 1965 and July 1966. They were part of the British Rail Class 47 order, but differed from their classmates by being fitted with a Sulzer V12 12LVA24 power unit producing 2,650 bhp (1,976 kW), as opposed to the standard 12LDA28C twin-bank twelve-cylinder unit of the remaining fleet.

== In service ==
The locomotives, numbered in the D1702-D1706 series, mainly worked from Tinsley depot in Sheffield on both passenger and freight work. In 1969, they moved to Norwich depot where they worked on express trains between there and London Liverpool Street. The 12LVA24 engine, however, was found to be unreliable and the locomotives spent more time out of service than their standard counterparts. Engine failures were common and repairs were often expensive. After conversion to Class 47s, they moved to Stratford depot, in East London, until they were displaced by examples fitted with electric train heating equipment. Subsequently, the batch went their separate ways to several depots.

== Rebuilding ==
Eventually, it was decided not to continue with the 12LVA24 experiment; the engines were removed and the locomotives were fitted with the standard 12LDA28 engines. D1702 was the first to be so treated at Crewe Works, using parts from D1908 which had been withdrawn after a serious accident; it emerged back into service in December 1969. All five locomotives had been so converted by early 1971 and then became standard Class 47s. The power units were sold to SNCF and used in their Class A1AA1A 68000 locomotives.

== Further service and preservation ==
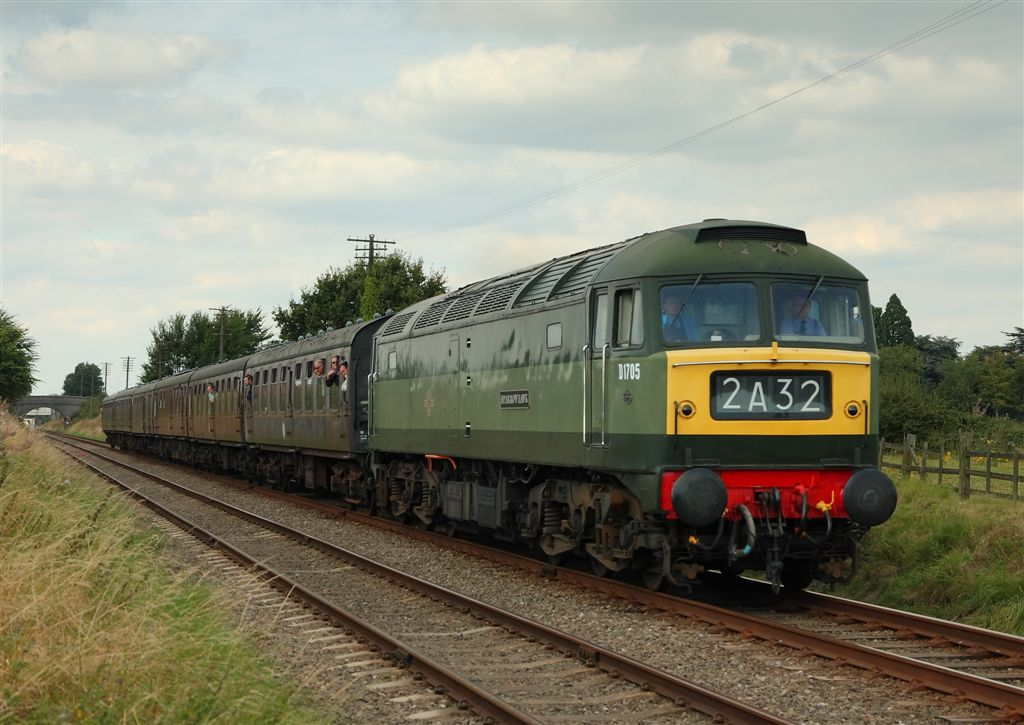
D1705 as preserved on the Great Central Railway.

The locomotives continued in service for many years afterwards and were renumbered 47114-47118 to conform with British Rail's TOPS system in the early 1970s. Four of the locomotives were withdrawn from service between December 1990 and January 1991 with the remaining locomotive, 47 114, being sidelined in 2002. Engine 47 117 (D1705) was subsequently bought for preservation by rail enthusiast and pop music producer Pete Waterman. It is now owned by the Type 1 Locomotive Association and works on the private Great Central Railway. At the GCR, it has been restored to BR two-tone green livery with its pre-TOPS number D1705, though it retains its Class 47 engine. It has also been named Sparrowhawk in the tradition of Brush Works policy of naming locomotives after birds of prey (qv Kestrel, Falcon, etc.), though it never carried this name in service. The other four locomotives have since been scrapped.

== Models ==
Model Rail have released 4 examples of the class in two tone green with either half yellow ends or full yellow ends in clean or weathered conditions.
